= List of acts of the Parliament of the United Kingdom from 1929 =

This is a complete list of acts of the Parliament of the United Kingdom for the year 1929.

Note that the first parliament of the United Kingdom was held in 1801; parliaments between 1707 and 1800 were either parliaments of Great Britain or of Ireland). For acts passed up until 1707, see the list of acts of the Parliament of England and the list of acts of the Parliament of Scotland. For acts passed from 1707 to 1800, see the list of acts of the Parliament of Great Britain. See also the list of acts of the Parliament of Ireland.

For acts of the devolved parliaments and assemblies in the United Kingdom, see the list of acts of the Scottish Parliament, the list of acts of the Northern Ireland Assembly, and the list of acts and measures of Senedd Cymru; see also the list of acts of the Parliament of Northern Ireland.

The number shown after each act's title is its chapter number. Acts passed before 1963 are cited using this number, preceded by the year(s) of the reign during which the relevant parliamentary session was held; thus the Union with Ireland Act 1800 is cited as "39 & 40 Geo. 3 c. 67", meaning the 67th act passed during the session that started in the 39th year of the reign of George III and which finished in the 40th year of that reign. Note that the modern convention is to use Arabic numerals in citations (thus "41 Geo. 3" rather than "41 Geo. III"). Acts of the last session of the Parliament of Great Britain and the first session of the Parliament of the United Kingdom are both cited as "41 Geo. 3". Acts passed from 1963 onwards are simply cited by calendar year and chapter number.

== 19 & 20 Geo. 5 ==
Continuing the fifth session of the 34th Parliament of the United Kingdom, which met from 6 November 1928 until 10 May 1929.

This session was also traditionally cited as 19 & 20 G. 5.

=== Public general acts ===
Short title	Citation	Royal assent
Long title
Imperial Telegraphs Act 1929 (repealed)	19 & 20 Geo. 5. c. 7	5 February 1929
An Act to authorise the sale of the telegraph undertakings established under the Pacific Cable Acts, 1901 to 1924, and the West Indian Islands (Telegraph) Act, 1924, (Note: West Indian Islands (Telegraph) Act 1924 (14 & 15 Geo. 5. c. 14)) and of certain submarine telegraph undertakings in the possession of the Postmaster-General, and to make provision for certain matters incidental thereto. (Repealed by Statute Law Revision Act 1963 (c. 30))
Appellate Jurisdiction Act 1929 (repealed)	19 & 20 Geo. 5. c. 8	5 February 1929
An Act to make further provision with respect to the constitution of the Judicial Committee of the Privy Council and to authorise the appointment of an additional Lord of Appeal in Ordinary. (Repealed by Statute Law (Repeals) Act 1976 (c. 16))
Law of Property (Amendment) Act 1929	19 & 20 Geo. 5. c. 9	5 February 1929
An Act to amend the provisions of the Law of Property Act, 1925, (Note: Law of Property Act 1925 (15 & 16 Geo. 5. c. 20)) relating to relief against forfeiture of under-leases.
Consolidated Fund (No. 2) Act 1929 (repealed)	19 & 20 Geo. 5. c. 10	27 March 1929
An Act to apply certain sums out of the Consolidated Fund to the service of the years ending on the thirty-first day of March, one thousand nine hundred and twenty-eight, one thousand nine hundred and twenty-nine, and one thousand nine hundred and thirty. (Repealed by Statute Law Revision Act 1950 (14 Geo. 6. c. 6))
Superannuation (Diplomatic Service) Act 1929 (repealed)	19 & 20 Geo. 5. c. 11	27 March 1929
An Act to amend the law with respect to the pensions of persons in the Diplomatic Service. (Repealed by Superannuation Act 1965 (c. 74))
Overseas Trade Act 1929 (repealed)	19 & 20 Geo. 5. c. 12	27 March 1929
An Act to extend the periods during which guarantees may respectively be given and remain in force under the Overseas Trade Acts, 1920 to 1926. (Repealed by Export Guarantees Act 1937 (1 Edw. 8 & 1 Geo. 6. c. 61))
Agricultural Credits (Scotland) Act 1929	19 & 20 Geo. 5. c. 13	27 March 1929
An Act to secure in Scotland by means of the formation of a company and the assistance thereof out of public funds the making of loans for agricultural purposes on favourable terms, and to facilitate the borrowing of money in Scotland on the security of agricultural assets; and for purposes connected therewith.
Northern Ireland Land Act 1929	19 & 20 Geo. 5. c. 14	27 March 1929
An Act to amend the Northern Ireland Land Act, 1925. (Note: Northern Ireland Land Act 1925 (15 & 16 Geo. 5. c. 34))
Factory and Workshop (Cotton Cloth Factories) Act 1929 (repealed)	19 & 20 Geo. 5. c. 15	27 March 1929
An Act to empower the Secretary of State to make regulations with respect to cotton cloth factories and for purposes connected with the enforcement of the enactments relating to such factories. (Repealed by Factories Act 1937 (1 Edw. 8 & 1 Geo. 6. c. 67))
Pensions (Governors of Dominions, &c.) Act 1929 (repealed)	19 & 20 Geo. 5. c. 16	27 March 1929
An Act to amend the law relating to the payment of pensions to Governors, and persons holding similar offices, who have served within His Majesty's Dominions, or in British Protectorates, or Mandated Territories. (Repealed by Governors' Pensions Act 1957 (5 & 6 Eliz. 2. c. 62))
Local Government Act 1929	19 & 20 Geo. 5. c. 17	27 March 1929
An Act to amend the law relating to the administration of poor relief, registration of births, deaths, and marriages, highways, town planning and local government; to extend the application of the Rating and Valuation (Apportionment) Act, 1928, (Note: Rating and Valuation (Apportionment) Act 1928 (18 & 19 Geo. 5. c. 44)) to hereditaments in which no persons are employed; to grant complete or partial relief from rates in the case of the hereditaments to which that Act applies; to discontinue certain grants from the Exchequer and provide other grants in lieu thereof; and for purposes consequential on the matters aforesaid.
Unemployment Insurance (Northern Ireland Agreement) Act 1929 (repealed)	19 & 20 Geo. 5. c. 18	27 March 1929
An Act to confirm and give effect to an agreement made between the Treasury and the Ministry of Finance for Northern Ireland for continuing the agreement set forth in the Unemployment Insurance (Northern Ireland Agreement) Act, 1926. (Note: Unemployment Insurance (Northern Ireland Agreement) Act 1926 (16 & 17 Geo. 5. c. 4)) (Repealed by Unemployment (Northern Ireland Agreement) Act 1936 (26 Geo. 5 & 1 Edw. 8. c. 10))
Unemployment Insurance (Transitional Provisions Amendment) Act 1929 (repealed)	19 & 20 Geo. 5. c. 19	27 March 1929
An Act to amend subsection (2) of section fourteen of the Unemployment Insurance Act, 1927, (Note: Unemployment Insurance Act 1927 (17 & 18 Geo. 5. c. 30)) by extending to twenty-four months the period of twelve months therein mentioned. (Repealed by Unemployment Act 1934 (24 & 25 Geo. 5. c. 29))
Army and Air Force (Annual) Act 1929 (repealed)	19 & 20 Geo. 5. c. 20	25 April 1929
An Act to provide, during Twelve Months, for the Discipline and Regulation of the Army and Air Force. (Repealed by Statute Law Revision Act 1950 (14 Geo. 6. c. 6) and Revision of the Army and Air Force Acts (Transitional Provisions) Act 1955 (3 & 4 Eliz. 2. c. 20))
Finance Act 1929 (repealed)	19 & 20 Geo. 5. c. 21	10 May 1929
An Act to re-impose income tax and to apply with respect to income tax and the annual value of property the like provisions (subject to the exception of certain temporary provisions contained in the Finance Act, 1926, (Note: Finance Act 1926 (16 & 17 Geo. 5. c. 22)) and the Finance Act, 1927 (Note: Finance Act 1927 (17 & 18 Geo. 5. c. 10)) as were applied in the last preceding year, to continue the duties of customs charged by section seven of the Finance Act, 1925, (Note: Finance Act 1925 (15 & 16 Geo. 5. c. 36)) on hops, preparations of hops and beer, and the additional excise drawback payable under the said section, to impose a duty of customs on hop oil, to apply section ninety-eight of the Customs Consolidation Act, 1876, (Note: Customs Consolidation Act 1876 (39 & 40 Vict. c. 36)) to hops, and to repeal the duty of excise payable on bets made with a bookmaker, the railway passenger duty, and the duty of customs on tea. (Repealed by Statute Law Revision Act 1950 (14 Geo. 6. c. 6), Customs and Excise Act 1952 (15 & 16 Geo. 6 & 1 Eliz. 2. c. 44), Statute Law Revision Act 1953 (2 & 3 Eliz. 2. c. 5), Finance Act 1957 (5 & 6 Eliz. 2. c. 49) and Statute Law (Repeals) Act 1969 (c. 52))
Appropriation Act 1929 (repealed)	19 & 20 Geo. 5. c. 22	10 May 1929
An Act to apply a sum out of the Consolidated Fund to the service of the year ending on the thirty-first day of March, one thousand nine hundred and thirty, and to appropriate the Supplies granted in this Session of Parliament. (Repealed by Statute Law Revision Act 1950 (14 Geo. 6. c. 6))
Companies Act 1929 (repealed)	19 & 20 Geo. 5. c. 23	10 May 1929
An Act to consolidate the Companies Acts, 1908 to 1928, and certain other enactments connected with the said Acts. (Repealed by Companies Act 1948 (11 & 12 Geo. 6. c. 38))
Gas Undertakings Act 1929 (repealed)	19 & 20 Geo. 5. c. 24	10 May 1929
An Act to amend the law with respect to gas undertakings, and for purposes connected therewith. (Repealed by Gas Act 1948 (11 & 12 Geo. 6. c. 67))
Local Government (Scotland) Act 1929	19 & 20 Geo. 5. c. 25	10 May 1929
An Act to transfer to county councils and to the town councils of certain burghs in Scotland functions of existing local authorities relating to poor relief, lunacy and mental deficiency, education, public health, and other matters; to amend the law relating to local government in Scotland; to extend the application of the Rating and Valuation (Apportionment) Act, 1928, to lands and heritages in which no persons are employed, to net and cruive salmon fishings and to minerals let but unworked; to grant relief from rates in the case of the lands and heritages in Scotland to which that Act applies; to discontinue grants from the Exchequer for certain purposes in Scotland and to provide other grants in lieu thereof; and for purposes consequential on the matters aforesaid.
Agricultural Rates Act 1929 (repealed)	19 & 20 Geo. 5. c. 26	10 May 1929
An Act to grant complete exemption from rates during the current half-year in the case of agricultural hereditaments in England to which the Rating and Valuation (Apportionment) Act, 1928, applies; and for purposes in connection therewith. (Repealed by Local Government Act 1958 (6 & 7 Eliz. 2. c. 55))
Savings Banks Act 1929 (repealed)	19 & 20 Geo. 5. c. 27	10 May 1929
An Act to amend the law relating to Savings Banks, Savings Bank Annuities, and the Post Office Register. (Repealed for the United Kingdom by Statute Law Revision Act 1950 (14 Geo. 6. c. 6), Post Office Savings Bank Act 1954 (2 & 3 Eliz. 2. c. 62), Trustee Savings Banks Act 1954 (2 & 3 Eliz. 2. c. 63), National Debt Act 1958 (7 & 8 Eliz. 2. c. 6) and Finance Act 1962 (10 & 11 Eliz. 2. c. 44) and for the Isle of Man by Statute Law (Repeals) Act 2004 (c. 14))
Industrial Assurance and Friendly Societies Act 1929 (repealed)	19 & 20 Geo. 5. c. 28	10 May 1929
An Act to permit the issue by Friendly Societies and Industrial Assurance Companies of policies of assurance on the duration of certain lives for a specified period, to validate certain endowment policies issued by such societies and companies, to exclude repayments of premiums under endowment policies from the computation of the maximum sums which may be paid on death by such societies and companies, and to make provision as to the rights of owners of certain endowment policies upon the surrender thereof. (Repealed by Friendly Societies Act 1992 (c. 40))
Government Annuities Act 1929	19 & 20 Geo. 5. c. 29	10 May 1929
An Act to consolidate the Government Annuities Acts, 1829 to 1888, and the enactments amending those Acts.
Chatham and Sheerness Stipendiary Magistrate Act 1929 (repealed)	19 & 20 Geo. 5. c. 30	10 May 1929
An Act to prevent difficulties arising in the event of the office of stipendiary magistrate for Chatham and Sheerness not being filled. (Repealed by Statute Law Revision Act 1950 (14 Geo. 6. c. 6))
Pharmacy Act 1929 (repealed)	19 & 20 Geo. 5. c. 31	10 May 1929
An Act to enable the Council of the Pharmaceutical Society of Great Britain to make byelaws providing for the registration, without examination, of persons registered as pharmaceutical chemists in Northern Ireland. (Repealed by Pharmacy Act 1954 (2 & 3 Eliz. 2. c. 61))
Artificial Cream Act 1929 (repealed)	19 & 20 Geo. 5. c. 32	10 May 1929
An Act to regulate the sale and manufacture of artificial cream. (Repealed for England and Wales by Food and Drugs Act 1938 (1 & 2 Geo. 6. c. 56) and for Scotland by Food and Drugs (Scotland) Act 1956 (4 & 5 Eliz. 2. c. 30))
Bridges Act 1929 (repealed)	19 & 20 Geo. 5. c. 33	10 May 1929
An Act to enable highway authorities and the owners of bridges carrying public carriage roads to make agreements with respect to the maintenance, improvement, reconstruction and transfer of such bridges, and of the approaches thereto and the roads carried thereby; to empower the Minister of Transport, in the absence of any such agreement, to make orders with respect to the matters aforesaid and for purposes incidental to the making of such agreements and orders. (Repealed for England and Wales by Highways Act 1959 (7 & 8 Eliz. 2. c. 25) and London Government Act 1963 (c. 33) and for Scotland by Roads (Scotland) Act 1984 (c. 54))
Infant Life (Preservation) Act 1929	19 & 20 Geo. 5. c. 34	10 May 1929
An Act to amend the law with regard to the destruction of children at or before birth.
Fire Brigade Pensions Act 1929 (repealed)	19 & 20 Geo. 5. c. 35	10 May 1929
An Act to amend section eighteen of the Fire Brigade Pensions Act, 1925. (Note: Fire Brigade Pensions Act 1925 (15 & 16 Geo. 5. c. 47)) (Repealed by Fire Services Act 1947 (10 & 11 Geo. 6. c. 41))
Age of Marriage Act 1929 (repealed)	19 & 20 Geo. 5. c. 36	10 May 1929
An Act to make void marriages between persons either of whom is under the age of sixteen. (Repealed for England and Wales by Affiliation Proceedings Act 1957 (5 & 6 Eliz. 2. c. 55) and for Scotland by Marriage (Scotland) Act 1977 (c. 15))
Police Magistrates Superannuation (Amendment) Act 1929 (repealed)	19 & 20 Geo. 5. c. 37	10 May 1929
An Act to amend the Police Magistrates (Superannuation) Act, 1915, (Note: Police Magistrates (Superannuation) Act 1915 (5 & 6 Geo. 5. c. 74)) so far as relates to Metropolitan Police Magistrates. (Repealed by Administration of Justice Act 1973 (c. 15))
Bastardy (Witness Process) Act 1929 (repealed)	19 & 20 Geo. 5. c. 38	10 May 1929
An Act to declare the law with respect to the issue of process by justices for compelling the attendance of witnesses in bastardy proceedings. (Repealed by Magistrates' Courts Act 1952 (15 & 16 Geo. 6 & 1 Eliz. 2. c. 55))
Salmon and Freshwater Fisheries (Amendment) Act 1929 (repealed)	19 & 20 Geo. 5. c. 39	10 May 1929
An Act to amend section thirty-two of the Salmon and Freshwater Fisheries Act, 1923. (Note: Salmon and Freshwater Fisheries Act 1923 (13 & 14 Geo. 5. c. 16)) (Repealed by Salmon and Freshwater Fisheries Act 1975 (c. 51))

=== Local acts ===
Short title	Citation	Royal assent
Long title
Parliament Square and Other Streets Act 1929	19 & 20 Geo. 5. c. v	27 March 1929
An Act to transfer from the Commissioners of Works to the Council of the City of Westminster powers and duties with respect to the paving repairing lighting watering and cleansing of certain carriageways and footways within the Palace of Westminster and for purposes connected with the matters aforesaid.
Ministry of Health Provisional Orders Confirmation (No. 1) Act 1929	19 & 20 Geo. 5. c. vi	27 March 1929
An Act to confirm certain Provisional Orders of the Minister of Health relating to Luddenden Joint Hospital District Middlesex Districts Joint Small-pox Hospital District Upper Stour Valley Main Sewerage District and Uxbridge Joint Hospital District.
	Luddenden Joint Hospital Order 1929 Provisional Order for partially repealing certain Confirming Acts.	
	Middlesex Districts Joint Small-pox Hospital Order 1929 Provisional Order for repealing certain Confirmation Acts.	
	Upper Stour Valley Main Sewerage Order 1929 Provisional Order amending certain confirmation Acts.	
	Uxbridge Joint Hospital Order 1929 Provisional Order for altering Confirmation Acts.	
Ministry of Health Provisional Orders Confirmation (No. 2) Act 1929	19 & 20 Geo. 5. c. vii	27 March 1929
An Act to confirm certain Provisional Orders of the Minister of Health relating to Montgomery and Somerset.
	County of Montgomery Order 1929 Provisional Order made in pursuance of subsection (2) of section 69 of the Local Government Act 1888. (Note: Local Government Act 1888 (51 & 52 Vict. c. 41))	
	County of Somerset Order 1929 Provisional Order made in pursuance of subsection (2) of section 69 of the Local Government Act 1888.	
Glasgow Young Women's Christian Association Order Confirmation Act 1929	19 & 20 Geo. 5. c. viii	27 March 1929
An Act to confirm a Provisional Order under the Private Legislation Procedure (Scotland) Act 1899 (Note: Private Legislation Procedure (Scotland) Act 1899 (62 & 63 Vict. c. 47)) relating to the Glasgow Young Women's Christian Association.
	Glasgow Young Women's Christian Association Order 1929 Provisional Order to transfer the property belonging to the Glasgow Young Women's Christian Association or vested in trustees for that Association to new trustees for two sections of the said Association respectively or to committees of the said sections to make provision for the constitution of the said sections to dissolve the said Association and to discharge the existing trustees and for other purposes.	
Glasgow Corporation Order Confirmation Act 1929	19 & 20 Geo. 5. c. ix	27 March 1929
An Act to confirm a Provisional Order under the Private Legislation Procedure (Scotland) Act 1899 relating to Glasgow Corporation.
	Glasgow Corporation Order 1929 Provisional Order to authorise the corporation of the city of Glasgow to divert the Duntocher Burn and close the dock at Dalmuir sewage works and construct a wharf there to construct tramways and other works to extend the time for the construction of tramways to confer further police powers and for other purposes.	
Asiatic Steam Navigation Company Act 1929	19 & 20 Geo. 5. c. x	27 March 1929
An Act to confirm the creation and issue of rupee shares and to define the respective rights of the holders of sterling shares and rupee shares in the capital of the Asiatic Steam Navigation Company Limited and for other purposes.
Lancashire Electric Power Act 1929	19 & 20 Geo. 5. c. xi	27 March 1929
An Act to confer further powers on the Lancashire Electric Power Company and for other purposes.
Sheffield Gas (Consolidation) Act 1929	19 & 20 Geo. 5. c. xii	27 March 1929
An Act to consolidate the Sheffield Gas Acts and Orders 1855 to 1928.
Llanelly Corporation Act 1929 (repealed)	19 & 20 Geo. 5. c. xiii	25 April 1929
An Act to empower the mayor aldermen and burgesses of the borough of Llanelly to make further provision with regard to water supply and markets and the health local government finance and improvement of the borough and for other purposes. (Repealed by Dyfed Act 1987 (c.xxiv))
Torquay Cemetery Act 1929 (repealed)	19 & 20 Geo. 5. c. xiv	25 April 1929
An Act to enable the Torquay Extramural Cemetery Company to enlarge their cemetery to raise additional capital and for other purposes. (Repealed by Torbay Corporation Act 1971 (c. xxxiii))
Corn Exchange Act 1929 (repealed)	19 & 20 Geo. 5. c. xv	25 April 1929
An Act to transfer to the Corn Exchange Company the undertaking of the London Corn Exchange Company to confer further powers on the Corn Exchange Company and authorise them to raise additional capital and for other purposes. (Repealed by Corn Exchange Act 1975 (c. xii))
South Suburban Gas Act 1929	19 & 20 Geo. 5. c. xvi	25 April 1929
An Act to provide for the transfer to the South Suburban Gas Company of the undertaking of the Northfleet and Greenhithe Gas Company Limited to extend the limits of the South Suburban Gas Company for the supply of gas and for other purposes.
Doncaster Area Drainage Act 1929	19 & 20 Geo. 5. c. xvii	10 May 1929
An Act to make provision for the better drainage of a certain area drained by the Rivers Don, Went, Torne, Aire, Ouse, and Trent; and for purposes connected therewith.
St. John's Hospital (Winchester) and Other Charities Scheme Confirmation Act 1929	19 & 20 Geo. 5. c. xviii	10 May 1929
An Act to confirm a Scheme of the Charity Commissioners for the application or management of the Charities in the City of Winchester called St. John's Hospital and the Allied Charities and the Hospital of St. Mary Magdalen.
	Scheme for the application or management of the following Charities in the City of Winchester:—: 1. The Charities called St. John's Hospital and the Allied Charities regulated by a Scheme of the Charity Commissioners of the 1st January 1895 as varied by Schemes of the said Commissioners of the 10th May 1907 3rd December 1915 and 25th January 1918 but exclusive of the Educational Branch of the said Charities constituted by an Order made by the said Commissioners on the 10th October 1905 under the Board of Education Act 1899 (Note: Board of Education Act 1899 (62 & 63 Vict. c. 33)) s. 2 (2); 2. The Charity called or known as the Hospital of St. Mary Magdalen regulated by a Scheme of the said Commissioners of the 9th June 1925.	
Provisional Orders (Marriages) Confirmation Act 1929 (repealed)	19 & 20 Geo. 5. c. xix	10 May 1929
An Act to confirm certain Provisional Orders made by one of His Majesty's Principal Secretaries of State under the Marriages Validity (Provisional Orders) Acts 1905 (Note: Provisional Order (Marriages) Act 1905 (5 Edw. 7. c. 23)) and 1924. (Note: Marriages Validity (Provisional Orders) Act 1924 (14 & 15 Geo. 5. c. 20)) (Repealed by Statute Law (Repeals) Act 1977 (c. 18))
	Saint Michael Bramcote Nottinghamshire and Saint Mary Knightwick Worcestershire Order.	
	Hartlepools Hospital Order.	
Ministry of Health Provisional Orders Confirmation (No. 4) Act 1929	19 & 20 Geo. 5. c. xx	10 May 1929
An Act to confirm certain Provisional Orders of the Minister of Health relating to Leyton Morley Newcastle-upon-Tyne and Tintwistle.
	Leyton Order 1929 Provisional Order altering and amending a Local Act. (Note: Leyton Urban District Council Act 1904 (4 Edw. 7. c. ccxl))	
	Morley Order 1929 Provisional Order altering the Morley Corporation Act 1923. (Note: Morley Corporation Act 1923 (13 & 14 Geo. 5. c. cv))	
	Newcastle-upon-Tyne (No. 2) Order 1929 rovisional Order to enable the Newcastle-upon-Tyne Corporation to put in force the compulsory clauses of the Lands Clauses Acts.	
	Tintwistle Order 1929 Provisional Order to enable the Rural District Council of Tintwistle to put in force the compulsory clauses of the Lands Clauses Acts	
Ministry of Health Provisional Order Confirmation (No. 5) Act 1929	19 & 20 Geo. 5. c. xxi	10 May 1929
An Act to confirm a Provisional Order of the Minister of Health relating to Walsall.
	Walsall Order 1929 Provisional Order to enable the Walsall Corporation to put in force the compulsory clauses of the Lands Clauses Acts.	
Ministry of Health Provisional Orders Confirmation (No. 6) Act 1929	19 & 20 Geo. 5. c. xxii	10 May 1929
An Act to confirm certain Provisional Orders of the Minister of Health relating to Brighton and Hove Bromley Guildford and Warrington.
	Brighton and Hove (Outfall Sewers) Order 1929 Provisional Order altering a confirmation Act. (Note: Ministry of Health Provisional Orders Confirmation (No. 5) Act 1924 (14 & 15 Geo. 5. c. xvii))	
	Bromley Order 1929 Provisional Order to enable the Bromley Corporation to put in force the compulsory clauses of the Lands Clauses Acts.	
	Guildford Order 1929 Provisional Order amending and partially repealing a local Act. (Note: Guildford Corporation Act 1926 (16 & 17 Geo. 5. c. lxxxv))	
	Warrington Order 1929 Provisional Order to enable the Warrington Corporation to put in force the compulsory clauses of the Lands Clauses Acts.	
Ministry of Health Provisional Order Confirmation (Middlesbrough Extension) Act 1929	19 & 20 Geo. 5. c. xxiii	10 May 1929
An Act to confirm a Provisional Order of the Minister of Health relating to Middlesbrough.
	Middlesbrough (Extension) Order 1929 Provisional Order for the extension of a County Borough.	
Ministry of Health Provisional Orders Confirmation (Yeovil Extension and Water) Act 1929	19 & 20 Geo. 5. c. xxiv	10 May 1929
An Act to confirm certain Provisional Orders of the Minister of Health relating to Yeovil.
	Yeovil (Extension) Order 1929 Provisional Order extending a Borough.	
	Yeovil (Water) Order 1929 Provisional Order amending certain local Acts.	
Ministry of Health Provisional Order Confirmation (Merthyr Tydfil Water Charges) Act 1929	19 & 20 Geo. 5. c. xxv	10 May 1929
An Act to confirm a Provisional Order of the Minister of Health relating to Merthyr Tydfil.
	Merthyr Tydfil (Water Charges) Order 1928 (Note: Although passed in 1929, the short title is specified as the Merthyr Tydfil (Water Charges) Order 1928.) The Merthyr Tydfil Water (Modification of Charges) Order 1928 dated November 20 1928 made by the Minister of Health under the Water Undertakings (Modification of Charges) Act 1921 (11 & 12 Geo. 5. c. 44). (Note: Water Undertakings (Modification of Charges) Act 1921 (11 & 12 Geo. 5. c. 44))	
Doncaster Corporation (Trolley Vehicles) Order Confirmation Act 1929 (repealed)	19 & 20 Geo. 5. c. xxvi	10 May 1929
An Act to confirm a Provisional Order made by the Minister of Transport under the Doncaster Corporation Act 1926 (Note: Doncaster Corporation Act 1926 (16 & 17 Geo. 5. c. xxvii)) relating to Doncaster Corporation trolley vehicles. (Repealed by Statute Law (Repeals) Act 1989 (c. 43))
	Doncaster Corporation (Trolley Vehicles) Order 1929 Order authorising the mayor aldermen and burgesses of the county borough of Doncaster to provide maintain and use trolley vehicles upon routes in the county borough of Doncaster.	
Southend-on-Sea Corporation (Trolley Vehicles) Order Confirmation Act 1929 (repealed)	19 & 20 Geo. 5. c. xxvii	10 May 1929
An Act to confirm a Provisional Order made by the Minister of Transport under the Southend-on-Sea Corporation Act 1926 (Note: Southend-on-Sea Corporation Act 1926 (16 & 17 Geo. 5. c. civ)) relating to Southend-on-Sea Corporation Trolley Vehicles. (Repealed by Essex Act 1987 (c. xx))
	Southend-on-Sea Corporation (Trolley Vehicles) Order 1929 Order authorising the mayor aldermen and burgesses of the borough of Southend-on-Sea to provide maintain and use trolley vehicles upon a route in the borough of Southend-on-Sea.	
Falkirk Burgh Order Confirmation Act 1929	19 & 20 Geo. 5. c. xxviii	10 May 1929
An Act to confirm a Provisional Order under the Private Legislation Procedure (Scotland) Act 1899 relating to Falkirk Burgh extension drainage &c.
	Falkirk Burgh Order 1929 Provisional Order to extend the boundaries of the burgh of Falkirk to authorise the Town Council of Falkirk to construct sewers and sewage works to acquire lands to borrow money to confer further powers upon the Toun Council in relation to streets and other matters and for other purposes.	
Nith Navigation Order Confirmation Act 1929	19 & 20 Geo. 5. c. xxix	10 May 1929
An Act to confirm a Provisional Order under the Private Legislation Procedure (Scotland) Act 1899 relating to Nith Navigation.
	Nith Navigation Order 1929 Provisional Order for the reconstitution and incorporation of the Nith Navigation Commissioners and for authorising the reconstituted Commissioners to maintain and improve the navigation of the river Nith acquire land execute works borrow money and exercise other powers for authorising certain county councils and town councils to guarantee repayment of moneys borrowed by the Commissioners to contribute to the funds of the Commissioners and to levy rates and for other purposes.	
Kirkcaldy Corporation Order Confirmation Act 1929 (repealed)	19 & 20 Geo. 5. c. xxx	10 May 1929
An Act to confirm a Provisional Order under the Private Legislation Procedure (Scotland) Act 1899 relating to Kirkcaldy Corporation. (Repealed by Kirkcaldy Corporation Order Confirmation Act 1939 (2 & 3 Geo. 6. c. vi))
	Kirkcaldy Corporation Order 1929 Provisional Order for providing and running omnibuses establishment of loans fund and simplification of borrowing.	
Dumfries and Maxwelltown Burghs Amalgamation Order Confirmation Act 1929	19 & 20 Geo. 5. c. xxxi	10 May 1929
An Act to confirm a Provisional Order under the Private Legislation Procedure (Scotland) Act 1899 relating to Dumfries and Maxwelltown Burghs Amalgamation.
	Dumfries and Maxwelltown Burghs Amalgamation Order 1929 Provisional Order to amalgamate the burghs of Dumfries and Maxwelltown into one burgh to extend the boundaries of the county of Dumfries and for other purposes.	
Dysart Corporation Order Confirmation Act 1929 (repealed)	19 & 20 Geo. 5. c. xxxii	10 May 1929
An Act to confirm a Provisional Order under the Private Legislation Procedure (Scotland) Act 1899 relating to Dysart Corporation. (Repealed by Kirkcaldy Corporation Order Confirmation Act 1939 (2 & 3 Geo. 6. c. vi))
	Dysart Corporation Order 1929 Frovisional Order to authorise the provost magistrates and councillors of the burgh of Dysart to borrow money and levy rates for the discharge of debts affecting the harbour of Dysart.	
London and North Eastern Railway Order Confirmation Act 1929	19 & 20 Geo. 5. c. xxxiii	10 May 1929
An Act to confirm a Provisional Order under the Private Legislation Procedure (Scotland) Act 1899 relating to the London and North Eastern Railway.
	London and North Eastern Railway Order 1929 Provisional Order to confer further powers upon the London and North Eastern Railway Company.	
Yorktown (Camberley) and District Gas and Electricity Act 1929	19 & 20 Geo. 5. c. xxxiv	10 May 1929
An Act to provide for the transfer of the gas undertaking of the mayor aldermen and burgesses of the borough of Wokingham to the Yorktown (Camberley) and District Gas and Electricity Company and to confer further powers on such company and for other purposes.
London and North Eastern Railway Act 1929	19 & 20 Geo. 5. c. xxxv	10 May 1929
An Act to empower the London and North Eastern Railway Company to acquire additional lands to extend the time for the completion of certain railways and for the compulsory purchase of certain lands and for other purposes.
Birkenhead Corporation Water Act 1929	19 & 20 Geo. 5. c. xxxvi	10 May 1929
An Act to amend the provisions of the Birkenhead Corporation Water Act 1907 (Note: Birkenhead Corporation Water Act 1907 (7 Edw. 7. c. cxxxi)) with respect to compensation water to confer further powers on the Corporation with respect to their water undertaking and for other purposes.
Blackburn Corporation Act 1929	19 & 20 Geo. 5. c. xxxvii	10 May 1929
An Act to empower the Corporation of Blackburn to provide and run omnibuses to make further provision with respect to their tramway water and electricity undertakings and the health local government and finance of the borough and for other purposes.
Pacific Cable Board (Pension and Provident Funds) Act 1929	19 & 20 Geo. 5. c. xxxviii	10 May 1929
An Act to make provision as to the pension fund and provident funds established by the Pacific Cable Board and for other purposes.
Salford Corporation Act 1929	19 & 20 Geo. 5. c. xxxix	10 May 1929
An Act to confer upon the mayor aldermen and citizens of the city of Salford borrowing and other financial powers and for other purposes.
Metropolitan Water Board Act 1929	19 & 20 Geo. 5. c. xl	10 May 1929
An Act to confer powers upon the Metropolitan Water Board.
Crowborough District Water Act 1929 (repealed)	19 & 20 Geo. 5. c. xli	10 May 1929
An Act to authorise and confirm the construction by the Crowborough District Water Company of certain new and existing works to increase the capital and borrowing powers of the Company to revise the powers of charge of the Company and for other purposes. (Repealed by Mid-Sussex Water Order 1985 (SI 1985/513))
Gas Light and Coke Company's Act 1929	19 & 20 Geo. 5. c. xlii	10 May 1929
An Act to provide for the transfer to the Gas Light and Coke Company of the undertakings of the Grays and Tilbury Gas Company and the Pinner Gas Company Limited to confer various powers upon the Gas Light and Coke Company and for other purposes.
Great Western Railway Act 1929	19 & 20 Geo. 5. c. xliii	10 May 1929
An Act for conferring further powers upon the Great Western Railway Company in respect of their own undertaking and upon that Company and the London Midland and Scottish Railway Company in respect of an undertaking in which they are jointly interested and upon the Great Western and Great Central Railways Joint Committee and for other purposes.
Leamington and Warwick Traction Act 1929 (repealed)	19 & 20 Geo. 5. c. xliv	10 May 1929
An Act to authorise the Leamington and Warwick Electrical Company Limited to abandon their tramways and provide and run omnibuses and for other purposes. (Repealed by Statute Law (Repeals) Act 1995 (c. 44))
Llanfrechfa Upper and Llantarnam Water Board Act 1929	19 & 20 Geo. 5. c. xlv	10 May 1929
An Act to constitute the Llanfrechfa Upper and Llantarnam Water Board to transfer to the Board the water undertaking of the Llanfrechfa Upper Urban District Council to empower the Board to construct new works and to supply water and for other purposes.
London, Midland and Scottish Railway Act 1929	19 & 20 Geo. 5. c. xlvi	10 May 1929
An Act to empower the London Midland and Scottish Railway Company to construct a railway deviation and works and to acquire lands to extend the time for the compulsory purchase of certain lands and for other purposes.
Royal Victoria and other Docks Approaches (Improvement) Act 1929	19 & 20 Geo. 5. c. xlvii	10 May 1929
An Act to empower the London County Council and the mayor aldermen and burgesses of the county borough of West Ham to make new streets street widenings and other works for the improvement of the approaches to the Royal Victoria Dock and other docks of the Port of London Authority and to construct and work new tramways in substitution for certain existing tramways to provide for contributions by other authorities towards the cost of the said works and for other purposes.
Southern Railway Act 1929	19 & 20 Geo. 5. c. xlviii	10 May 1929
An Act to empower the Southern Railway Company to construct works and acquire lands to extend the time for the completion of certain works and the compulsory purchase of certain lands to abandon certain railways and works and for other purposes.
Tyne Improvement Act 1929	19 & 20 Geo. 5. c. xlix	10 May 1929
An Act to confer further powers on the Tyne Improvement Commissioners and for other purposes.
Westminster City (Millbank) Improvement Act 1929	19 & 20 Geo. 5. c. l	10 May 1929
An Act to enable the council of the city of Westminster and the Duke of Westminster and his successors in title as owners of the Millbank Estate to make provision for rehousing the working class inhabitants of the said estate to make street improvements in connection with the redevelopment of the said estate and to make agreements for the provision of the money required for those purposes.
Winchester Water and Gas Act 1929	19 & 20 Geo. 5. c. li	10 May 1929
An Act to extend the limits of supply for water and gas of the Winchester Water and Gas Company to confer further powers on the Company and for other purposes.
Windermere Urban District Council Act 1929	19 & 20 Geo. 5. c. lii	10 May 1929
An Act to transfer to and vest in the Windermere Urban District Council the undertaking of the Windermere District Gas and Water Company and to authorise that Council to supply water and gas and for other purposes.
London County Council (Money) Act 1929 (repealed)	19 & 20 Geo. 5. c. liii	10 May 1929
An Act to regulate the expenditure on capital account and lending of money by the London County Council during the financial period from the first day of April one thousand nine hundred and twenty-nine to the thirtieth day of September one thousand nine hundred and thirty and for other purposes. (Repealed by London County Council (Loans) Act 1955 (4 & 5 Eliz. 2. c. xxvi))
Great Western Railway (Air Transport) Act 1929 (repealed)	19 & 20 Geo. 5. c. liv	10 May 1929
An Act to empower the Great Western Railway Company to provide air transport services and for other purposes. (Repealed by Railways Act 1993 (c. 43))
London and North Eastern Railway (Air Transport) Act 1929 (repealed)	19 & 20 Geo. 5. c. lv	10 May 1929
An Act to empower the London and North Eastern Railway Company to provide air transport services and for other purposes. (Repealed by Railways Act 1993 (c. 43))
London, Midland and Scottish Railway (Air Transport) Act 1929 (repealed)	19 & 20 Geo. 5. c. lvi	10 May 1929
An Act to empower the London Midland and Scottish Railway Company to provide air transport services and for other purposes. (Repealed by Railways Act 1993 (c. 43))
Southern Railway (Air Transport) Act 1929 (repealed)	19 & 20 Geo. 5. c. lvii	10 May 1929
An Act to empower the Southern Railway Company to provide air transport services and for other purposes. (Repealed by Railways Act 1993 (c. 43))
Soke and City of Peterborough Act 1929	19 & 20 Geo. 5. c. lviii	10 May 1929
An Act to empower the county council of the administrative county of the Soke of Peterborough to construct a street with bridges over the river Nene and the London and North Eastern Railway and other street works connected therewith in the city and borough of Peterborough to empower the mayor aldermen citizens and burgesses of the said city and borough to purchase lands for the extension of their generating station for making and improving streets for a parking ground and for housing and for other purposes.
Methodist Church Union Act 1929 (repealed)	19 & 20 Geo. 5. c. lix	10 May 1929
An Act to authorise the union of the Wesleyan Methodist Church the Primitive Methodist Church and the United Methodist Church to deal with real and personal and heritable and moveable property belonging to the said Churches or denominations to provide for the vesting of the said property in trust for the Church so formed and for the assimilation of the trusts thereof and for other purposes. (Repealed by Methodist Church Act 1976 (c. xxx))
Southampton Corporation Act 1929	19 & 20 Geo. 5. c. lx	10 May 1929
An Act to empower the mayor aldermen and burgesses of the borough of Southampton to erect a town hall to confer further powers upon the said mayor aldermen and burgesses and for other purposes.
Nottingham Corporation Act 1929	19 & 20 Geo. 5. c. lxi	10 May 1929
An Act to authorise the lord mayor aldermen and citizens of the city of Nottingham and county of the same city to construct sewerage and sewage disposal works street works and waterworks to purchase lands compulsorily for various purposes to extend the Corporation's limits for the supply of water to empower the Corporation to run trolley vehicles on further routes to confer further powers upon the Corporation with regard to streets and buildings and the health and good government of the city and for other purposes.
Southport and District Water Act 1929	19 & 20 Geo. 5. c. lxii	10 May 1929
An Act to confer further powers on and to change the name of the Southport Birkdale and West Lancashire Water Board and for other purposes.
Lewes Corporation Act 1929	19 & 20 Geo. 5. c. lxiii	10 May 1929
An Act to provide for the transfer of the undertaking and powers of the Lewes Water Company to the mayor aldermen and burgesses of the borough of Lewes to authorise the said mayor aldermen and burgesses to supply water in and in the neighbourhood of their borough and for other purposes.
Halifax Corporation Act 1929 (repealed)	19 & 20 Geo. 5. c. lxiv	10 May 1929
An Act to confer further powers on the Halifax Corporation with respect to their tramway omnibus and electricity undertakings and for other purposes. (Repealed by West Yorkshire Act 1980 (c. xiv))
Gosport and Fareham Omnibus Services Act 1929	19 & 20 Geo. 5. c. lxv	10 May 1929
An Act to authorise the abandonment of the tramways of the Portsmouth Street Tramways Company and to provide for the running of omnibuses in substitution therefor to alter the existing powers of the Company to run omnibuses and to change the Company's name and for other purposes.
Haslingden Corporation Act 1929	19 & 20 Geo. 5. c. lxvi	10 May 1929
An Act to empower the Corporation of Haslingden to provide and run omnibuses to make further provision with respect to their omnibus and electricity undertakings and for other purposes.
Jarrow and South Shields Light Railways (Abandonment) Act 1929	19 & 20 Geo. 5. c. lxvii	10 May 1929
An Act to provide for the abandonment of the railways authorised by the Jarrow and South Shields Light Railways Order 1901 to repeal the said Order and for other purposes.
Preston Corporation Act 1929	19 & 20 Geo. 5. c. lxviii	10 May 1929
An Act to empower the Corporation of Preston to construct a weir across the river Ribble and to execute street improvements to make further provision with reference to their electricity undertaking and the finance of the borough and for other purposes.
Iveagh Bequest (Kenwood) Act 1929	19 & 20 Geo. 5. c. lxix	10 May 1929
An Act to confirm and give effect to a Deed of Trust relating to a gift by the first Earl of Iveagh for public purposes of property at Kenwood in the metropolitan boroughs of Hampstead and Saint Pancras in the county of London and the borough of Hornsey and the urban district of Finchley in the county of Middlesex and for purposes connected therewith.
Birmingham Corporation (Rivers Improvement) Act 1929	19 & 20 Geo. 5. c. lxx	10 May 1929
An Act to empower the lord mayor aldermen and citizens of the city of Birmingham to construct works for the improvement of the rivers Rea and Tame and for other purposes.
Oldbury Urban District Council Act 1929 (repealed)	19 & 20 Geo. 5. c. lxxi	10 May 1929
An Act to empower the Oldbury Urban District Council to acquire lands and execute street improvements and to make further and better provision for the health local government finance and improvement of the district and for other purposes. (Repealed by Warley Corporation Act 1969 (c. liv))
Aire and Calder Navigation Act 1929	19 & 20 Geo. 5. c. lxxii	10 May 1929
An Act to extend the time for the completion of certain widenings of the Knottingley and Goole Canal to make further provision with regard to shipping dues and wharfage rates at the Port of Goole to relieve the Undertakers of the Aire and Calder Navigation of the liability to maintain and keep navigable a portion of the River Aire and for other purposes.
Chatham and District Traction Act 1929 (repealed)	19 & 20 Geo. 5. c. lxxiii	10 May 1929
An Act to make provision as to the abandonment of the light railways tramways and tramroads owned or worked by the Chatham and District Light Railways Company to authorise the Company to run omnibuses to change the name of the Company and for other purposes. (Repealed by Chatham and District Traction Act 1955 (4 & 5 Eliz. 2. c. xiv))
Cheltenham District Traction Act 1929	19 & 20 Geo. 5. c. lxxiv	10 May 1929
An Act to authorise the Cheltenham and District Light Railway Company to abandon their light railways and provide and run omnibuses to change the name of the Company and for other purposes.
Mexborough and Swinton Traction Act 1929 (repealed)	19 & 20 Geo. 5. c. lxxv	10 May 1929
An Act to authorise the Mexborough and Swinton Tramways Company to run omnibuses on their trolley vehicle routes and elsewhere to make further provision in regard to their trolley vehicle undertaking to change the name of the Company to reduce the existing capital of the Company to authorise them to raise additional capital and for other purposes. (Repealed by Mexborough and Swinton Traction Act 1960 (8 & 9 Eliz. 2. c. xxiv))
Mansfield District Traction Act 1929 (repealed)	19 & 20 Geo. 5. c. lxxvi	10 May 1929
An Act to authorise the Mansfield and District Light Railway Company to provide and run trolley vehicles and omnibuses to change the name of the Company and for other purposes. (Repealed by Statute Law (Repeals) Act 1995 (c. 44))
Newport (Salop.) Urban District Council Act 1929	19 & 20 Geo. 5. c. lxxvii	10 May 1929
An Act to vest in the urban district council of Newport (Salop) the property and liabilities of the Newport Town and Marsh Trustees to make provision in regard to the supply of gas by the Council and for other purposes.
Mount Vernon Hospital Act 1929	19 & 20 Geo. 5. c. lxxviii	10 May 1929
An Act to regulate the use of the Mount Vernon Hospital Estate and the application of certain of the funds and investments in the hands of the Mount Vernon Hospital (Incorporated) and for other purposes.
Warrington Corporation Water Act 1929	19 & 20 Geo. 5. c. lxxix	10 May 1929
An Act to empower the mayor aldermen and burgesses of the borough of Warrington to construct waterworks to make further provision with regard to their water undertaking and for other purposes.
Galloway Water Power Act 1929 (repealed)	19 & 20 Geo. 5. c. lxxx	10 May 1929
An Act for incorporating and conferring powers upon the Galloway Water Power Company and for other purposes. (Repealed by South of Scotland Electricity Order Confirmation Act 1956 (4 & 5 Eliz. 2. c. xciv))
Manchester Corporation Act 1929	19 & 20 Geo. 5. c. lxxxi	10 May 1929
An Act to confer further powers upon the lord mayor aldermen and citizens of the city of Manchester in relation to their tramway and electricity undertakings and for other purposes.
County of Cornwall Act 1929	19 & 20 Geo. 5. c. lxxxii	10 May 1929
An Act to empower the county council of the administrative county of Cornwall to extend and improve Torpoint Ferry and to construct a new bridge and street works at Penryn to vest the Bodmin County Asylum Estate in the said Council and make provision for the constitution of the asylum committee to make further provision with regard to highways the protection of rivers and streams and public health and for other purposes.
South Lancashire Transport Act 1929 (repealed)	19 & 20 Geo. 5. c. lxxxiii	10 May 1929
An Act to authorise the South Lancashire Tramways Company to provide and run trolley vehicles and omnibuses to change the name of the Company and for other purposes. (Repealed by South Lancashire Transport Act 1958 (6 & 7 Eliz. 2. c. xxxiii))
Grimsby Corporation (Dock, &c.) Act 1929	19 & 20 Geo. 5. c. lxxxiv	10 May 1929
An Act to empower the mayor aldermen and burgesses of the county borough of Grimsby to construct a dock and other works adjoining the existing docks at Grimsby to confer further powers upon the Corporation in regard to financial matters and for other purposes.
Wandsworth, Wimbledon and Epsom District Gas Act 1929	19 & 20 Geo. 5. c. lxxxv	10 May 1929
An Act to convert the existing capital of the Wandsworth Wimbledon and Epsom District Gas Company to make new provisions as to the charges for gas supplied by and the application of the profits of the Company and for other purposes.
Derbyshire and Nottinghamshire Electric Power Act 1929	19 & 20 Geo. 5. c. lxxxvi	10 May 1929
An Act to authorise the Derbyshire and Nottinghamshire Electric Power Company to raise additional capital to confer further powers upon the Company and for other purposes.
London County Council (General Powers) Act 1929	19 & 20 Geo. 5. c. lxxxvii	10 May 1929
An Act to confer further powers upon the London County Council and metropolitan borough councils and for other purposes.
Kingston-upon-Hull Extension Act 1929	19 & 20 Geo. 5. c. lxxxviii	10 May 1929
An Act to extend the boundaries of the city and county of Kingston upon Hull and for purposes incidental thereto.
Imperial Continental Gas Association Act 1929	19 & 20 Geo. 5. c. lxxxix	10 May 1929
An Act to confer further powers on the Imperial Continental Gas Association to repeal and re-enact with amendments the provisions of the several Acts governing the Association and for other purposes.
Rhodes Trust Act 1929	19 & 20 Geo. 5. c. xc	10 May 1929
An Act to amend the provisions of the Will of the late Right Honourable Cecil John Rhodes and for other purposes.
Tunbridge Wells Corporation Act 1929	19 & 20 Geo. 5. c. xci	10 May 1929
An Act to empower the mayor aldermen and burgesses of the borough of Tunbridge Wells to erect a town hall and other buildings to acquire lands for those purposes and for the purposes of their water undertaking and the protection of their water supply from contamination to make further provision with regard to the supply of water by the Corporation and for other purposes.
Smethwick Corporation Act 1929 (repealed)	19 & 20 Geo. 5. c. xcii	10 May 1929
An Act to confer further powers upon the corporation of Smethwick with regard to watercourses and for the prevention of floods to make better provision for the health local government and finance of the borough and for other purposes. (Repealed by West Midlands County Council Act 1980 (c. xi))
Metropolitan Railway Act 1929	19 & 20 Geo. 5. c. xciii	10 May 1929
An Act to authorise the Metropolitan Railway Company to execute works and to acquire lands to extend the time for the compulsory purchase of certain lands and the completion of certain works to authorise the Company to raise further moneys to confer further powers on the Company and the Metropolitan and Great Central Joint Committee and for other purposes.
Pontypridd Urban District Council Act 1929	19 & 20 Geo. 5. c. xciv	10 May 1929
An Act to empower the Pontypridd Urban District Council to provide and work trolley vehicles and omnibuses and for other purposes.
Newcastle-upon-Tyne and Gateshead Gas Act 1929	19 & 20 Geo. 5. c. xcv	10 May 1929
An Act to confer further powers upon the Newcastle-upon-Tyne and Gateshead Gas Company and for other purposes.
Chester Corporation Act 1929	19 & 20 Geo. 5. c. xcvi	10 May 1929
An Act to authorise the Corporation of Chester to construct street works and to provide and work omnibuses to confer further powers upon them with regard to their electricity and markets undertakings the regulation of the river Dee and the health local government and improvement of the city and for other purposes.

=== Private and personal acts ===
Short title	Citation	Royal assent
Long title
Beaumont Thomas Estate Act 1929	19 & 20 Geo. 5. c. 1 Pr.	10 May 1929
An Act to provide during the subsistence of the trust of accumulation contained in the will of Richard Beaumont Thomas deceased and during the lifetime and widowhood of his widow for the maintenance of the Testator's children and grandchildren out of the surplus income of the Testator's residuary estate and to direct how certain sums already paid for their maintenance advancement and benefit are to be accounted for and for the payment of an additional annuity to his widow and to enable the Testator's sons to appoint annuities to their widows and for other purposes.

== 20 & 21 Geo. 5 ==
The first session of the 35th Parliament of the United Kingdom, which met from 25 June 1929 until 1 August 1930.

This session was also traditionally cited as 20 & 21 G. 5.

=== Public general acts ===
Short title	Citation	Royal assent
Long title
Isle of Man (Customs) Act 1929 (repealed)	20 & 21 Geo. 5. c. 1	26 July 1929
An Act to amend the law with respect to Customs in the Isle of Man. (Repealed for the Isle of Man by Customs and Excise etc. Order 1976 (GC No 1/76))
Government of India (Aden) Act 1929 (repealed)	20 & 21 Geo. 5. c. 2	26 July 1929
An Act to enable the superintendence, direction, or control of the military government of Aden to be transferred to and vested in such person or authority as His Majesty may, by Order in Council, direct; and for purposes consequential on the matters aforesaid. (Repealed by Government of India Act 1935 (26 Geo. 5 & 1 Edw. 8. c. 2))
Unemployment Insurance Act 1929 (repealed)	20 & 21 Geo. 5. c. 3	26 July 1929
An Act to amend the Unemployment Insurance Acts, 1920 to 1929, with respect to the amount of the contribution to be paid under those Acts out of moneys provided by Parliament. (Repealed by Unemployment Insurance Act 1935 (25 & 26 Geo. 5. c. 8))
Irish Free State (Confirmation of Agreement) Act 1929 (repealed)	20 & 21 Geo. 5. c. 4	26 July 1929
An Act to confirm and give effect to a certain agreement for interpreting and supplementing Article Ten of the Articles of Agreement for a Treaty between Great Britain and Ireland to which the force of law was given by the Irish Free State (Agreement) Act, 1922, (Note: Irish Free State (Agreement) Act 1922 (12 & 13 Geo. 5. c. 4)) and by the Constitution of the Irish Free State (Saorstát Eireann) Act, 1922. (Note: Constitution of the Irish Free State (Saorstát Eireann) Act 1922 (No. 1)) (Repealed by Statute Law (Repeals) Act 1989 (c. 43))
Colonial Development Act 1929 (repealed)	20 & 21 Geo. 5. c. 5	26 July 1929
An Act to authorise the making of advances for aiding and developing agriculture and industry in certain colonies and territories, to provide for the extension of the Colonial Stock Acts, 1877 to 1900, to stock forming part of the public debt of certain protected and mandated territories, and to amend the Palestine and East Africa Loans Act, 1926, (Note: Palestine and East Africa Loans Act 1926 (16 & 17 Geo. 5. c. 62)) and section eleven of the Trusts (Scotland) Act, 1921. (Note: Trusts (Scotland) Act 1921 (11 & 12 Geo. 5. c. 58)) (Repealed by Statute Law (Repeals) Act 1998 (c. 43))
Housing (Revision of Contributions) Act 1929 (repealed)	20 & 21 Geo. 5. c. 6	26 July 1929
An Act to amend the Housing Acts (Revision of Contributions) Order, 1928, (Note: Housing Acts (Revision of Contributions) Order 1928 (SR&O 1928/1039)) made under section five of the Housing (Financial Provisions) Act, 1924, so far as it relates to houses in respect of which contributions are payable under section two of that Act. (Repealed by Statute Law (Repeals) Act 1981 (c. 19))
Development (Loan Guarantees and Grants) Act 1929 (repealed)	20 & 21 Geo. 5. c. 7	26 July 1929
An Act to authorise the Treasury to guarantee certain loans to be raised in connection with public utility undertakings, and to authorise the giving of financial assistance in respect of expenditure incurred or loans raised for development works. (Repealed by Statute Law (Repeals) Act 1973 (c. 39))
Land Drainage Act 1929 (repealed)	20 & 21 Geo. 5. c. 8	26 July 1929
An Act to make further provision with respect to the construction of certain references to rateable value in enactments relating to the drainage and protection of land. (Repealed by Land Drainage Act 1930 (20 & 21 Geo. 5. c. 44))
Under Secretaries of State Act 1929 (repealed)	20 & 21 Geo. 5. c. 9	6 December 1929
An Act to indemnify certain persons from any penal consequences which they may have incurred by sitting and voting as members of the Commons House of Parliament while holding the office of Under Secretary of State, and to render valid the election of such persons. (Repealed by Statute Law Revision Act 1950 (14 Geo. 6. c. 6))
Widows', Orphans' and Old Age Contributory Pensions Act 1929 (repealed)	20 & 21 Geo. 5. c. 10	6 December 1929
An Act to amend the Widows', Orphans' and Old Age Contributory Pensions Act, 1925, (Note: Widows', Orphans' and Old Age Contributory Pensions Act 1925 (15 & 16 Geo. 5. c. 70)) section three of the Old Age Pensions Act, 1908, (Note: Old Age Pensions Act 1908 (8 Edw. 7. c. 40)) section three of the Old Age Pensions Act, 1919, (Note: Old Age Pensions Act 1919 (9 & 10 Geo. 5. c. 102)) and the enactments regulating the right to become a voluntary contributor under the National Health Insurance Acts, 1924 to 1928, and the mode of collecting contributions under those Acts, and to provide for the exclusion of payments on account of widows' or orphans' pensions in the assessment of damages under the Fatal Accidents Acts, 1846 to 1908. (Repealed by National Health Insurance Act 1936 (26 Geo. 5 & 1 Edw. 8. c. 32) and Widows', Orphans' and Old Age Contributory Pensions Act 1936 (26 Geo. 5 & 1 Edw. 8. c. 33))
Consolidated Fund (No. 1) Act 1929 (Session 2) (repealed)	20 & 21 Geo. 5. c. 11	20 December 1929
An Act to apply a sum out of the Consolidated Fund to the service of the year ending on the thirty-first day of March, one thousand nine hundred and thirty. (Repealed by Statute Law Revision Act 1950 (14 Geo. 6. c. 6))
Expiring Laws Continuance Act 1929 (repealed)	20 & 21 Geo. 5. c. 12	20 December 1929
An Act to continue certain expiring laws. (Repealed by Statute Law Revision Act 1950 (14 Geo. 6. c. 6))
Highlands and Islands (Medical Service) Additional Grant Act 1929 (repealed)	20 & 21 Geo. 5. c. 13	20 December 1929
An Act to make provision with respect to an additional special grant for the purpose of improving medical service in the Highlands and Islands of Scotland. (Repealed by National Health Service (Scotland) Act 1947 (10 & 11 Geo. 6. c. 27))

=== Local acts ===
Short title	Citation	Royal assent
Long title
Ministry of Health Provisional Orders Confirmation (No. 3) Act 1929	20 & 21 Geo. 5. c. i	26 July 1929
An Act to confirm certain Provisional Orders of the Minister of Health relating to Cardiff Gateshead Newcastle-upon-Tyne and Uxbridge.
	Cardiff Order 1929 Provisional Order altering or amending certain local Acts.	
	Gateshead Order 1929 Provisional Order for partially repealing altering and amending certain local Acts.	
	Newcastle-upon-Tyne Order 1929 Provisional Order amending certain local Acts and a Provisional Order.	
	Uxbridge (Acquisition of Lands) Order 1929 Provisional Order to enable the Urban District Council of Uxbridge to put in force the Compulsory Clauses of the Lands Clauses Acts.	
Ministry of Health Provisional Orders Confirmation (No. 7) Act 1929	20 & 21 Geo. 5. c. ii	26 July 1929
An Act to confirm certain Provisional Orders of the Minister of Health relating to Gillingham and Sunderland.
	Gillingham Order 1929 Provisional Order to enable the Gillingham Corporation to put in force the compulsory clauses of the Lands Clauses Acts.	
	Sunderland Order 1929 Provisional Order to enable the Sunderland Corporation to put in force the compulsory clauses of the Lands Clauses Acts.	
Ministry of Health Provisional Orders Confirmation (No. 8) Act 1929	20 & 21 Geo. 5. c. iii	26 July 1929
An Act to confirm certain Provisional Orders of the Minister of Health relating to Baildon Cambridge Oswestry and South Staffordshire Joint Small-pox Hospital District.
	Baildon Order 1929 Provisional Order altering a local Act. (Note: Baildon Local Board Water Act 1890 (53 & 54 Vict. c. xvii))	
	Cambridge Order 1929 Provisional Order amending the Cambridge Corporation Act 1922. (Note: Cambridge Corporation Act 1922 (12 & 13 Geo. 5. c. lxxxviii))	
	Oswestry Order 1929 Provisional Order altering and amending certain local Acts and confirmation Acts.	
	South Staffordshire Joint Small-pox Hospital Order 1929 Provisional Order altering a confirming Act. (Note: Local Government Board's Provisional Orders Confirmation (No. 14) Act 1903 (3 Edw. 7. c. lxxx))	
Ministry of Health Provisional Orders Confirmation (No. 9) Act 1929	20 & 21 Geo. 5. c. iv	26 July 1929
An Act to confirm certain Provisional Orders of the Minister of Health relating to Bognor and South Mimms.
	Bognor (Water) Order 1929 Provisional Order altering certain local Acts.	
	Bognor (Acquisition of Lands) Order 1929 Provisional Order to enable the Urban District Council of Bognor to put in force the compulsory clauses of the Lands Clauses Acts.	
	South Mimms Order 1929 Provisional Order dissolving the South Mimms Special Drainage District.	
Ministry of Health Provisional Orders Confirmation (No. 10) Act 1929	20 & 21 Geo. 5. c. v	26 July 1929
An Act to confirm certain Provisional Orders of the Minister of Health relating to Maidstone Northampton Pontardawe and Southampton.
	Maidstone Order 1929 Provisional Order to enable the Maidstone Corporation to put in force the compulsory clauses of the Lands Clauses Acts.	
	Northampton Order 1929 Provisional Order to enable the Northampton Corporation to put in force the compulsory clauses of the Lands Clauses Acts.	
	Pontardawe Order 1929 Provisional Order to enable the Rural District Council of Pontardawe to put in force the compulsory clauses of the Lands Clauses Acts.	
	Southampton Order 1929 Provisional Order to enable the Southampton Corporation to put in force the compulsory clauses of the Lands Clauses Acts.	
Darlington Corporation Trolley Vehicles (Additional Routes) Order Confirmation Act 1929	20 & 21 Geo. 5. c. vi	26 July 1929
An Act to confirm a Provisional Order made by the Minister of Transport under the Darlington Corporation (Transport &c.) Act 1925 (Note: Darlington Corporation (Transport, &c.) Act 1925 (15 & 16 Geo. 5. c. cxvi)) relating to Darlington Corporation Trolley Vehicles.
	Darlington Corporation Trolley Vehicles (Additional Routes) Order 1929 Order authorising the mayor aldermen and burgesses of the borough of Darlington to use trolley vehicles upon additional routes in the county borough of Darlington.	
Pier and Harbour Orders Confirmation Act 1929	20 & 21 Geo. 5. c. vii	26 July 1929
An Act to confirm certain Provisional Orders made by the Minister of Transport under the General Pier and Harbour Act 1861 (Note: General Pier and Harbour Act 1861 (24 & 25 Vict. c. 45)) relating to Cattewater and Neyland.
	Cattewater Harbour Order 1929 Provisional Order for amending the Cattewater Harbour Orders 1915 and 1925 and for conferring further powers on the Cattewater Commissioners.	
	Pembrokeshire (Neyland Landing Stage) Order 1929 Provisional Order authorising the County Council of the Administrative County of Pembroke to construct a landing stage within the Urban District of Neyland and for other purposes.	
Kilmarnock Water Order Confirmation Act 1929	20 & 21 Geo. 5. c. viii	26 July 1929
An Act to confirm a Provisional Order under the Burgh Police (Scotland) Act 1892 (Note: Burgh Police (Scotland) Act 1892 (55 & 56 Vict. c. 55)) relating to Kilmarnock Water.
	Kilmarnock Water Order 1929 Kilmarnock Water. Provisional Order.	
London, Midland and Scottish Railway Order Confirmation Act 1929	20 & 21 Geo. 5. c. ix	26 July 1929
An Act to confirm a Provisional Order under the Private Legislation Procedure (Scotland) Act 1899 (Note: Private Legislation Procedure (Scotland) Act 1899 (62 & 63 Vict. c. 47)) relating to the London Midland and Scottish Railway.
	London, Midland and Scottish Railway Order 1929 Provisional Order to confer additional powers upon the London Midland and Scottish Railway Company to make byelaws in relation to their docks and canals to extend the time for the completion of certain authorised works and for the purchase of lands and for other purposes.	
Inverness Water and Gas Order Confirmation Act 1929	20 & 21 Geo. 5. c. x	26 July 1929
An Act to confirm a Provisional Order under the Private Legislation Procedure (Scotland) Act 1899 relating to Inverness Water and Gas.
	Inverness Water and Gas Order 1929 Provisional Order to authorise the town council of Inverness to construct additional waterworks to confer further powers on the town council in connection with their water and gas undertakings to borrow further moneys and for other purposes.	
Leith Harbour and Docks Order Confirmation Act 1929 (repealed)	20 & 21 Geo. 5. c. xi	26 July 1929
An Act to confirm a Provisional Order under the Private Legislation Procedure (Scotland) Act 1899 relating to Leith Harbour and Docks. (Repealed by Statute Law (Repeals) Act 1998 (c. 43))
	Leith Harbour and Docks Order 1929 Provisional Order to extend the time for the compulsory purchase of lands authorised by the Leith Harbour and Docks Act 1913 (Note: Leith Harbour and Docks Act 1913 (3 & 4 Geo. 5. c. lxxxvii)) the Leith Harbour and Docks Order 1919 and the Leith Harbour and Docks Order 1925 and for other purposes.	
Dunfermline and District Traction Order Confirmation Act 1929	20 & 21 Geo. 5. c. xii	26 July 1929
An Act to confirm a Provisional Order under the Private Legislation Procedure (Scotland) Act 1899 relating to Dunfermline and District Traction.
	Dunfermline and District Traction Order 1929 Provisional Order to confer further powers upon the Dunfermline and District Tramways Company to change the name of the Company and for other purposes.	
Falkirk and District Traction Order Confirmation Act 1929	20 & 21 Geo. 5. c. xiii	26 July 1929
An Act to confirm a Provisional Order under the Private Legislation Procedure (Scotland) Act 1899 relating to Falkirk and District Traction.
	Falkirk and District Traction Order 1929 Provisional Order to confer further powers upon the Falkirk and District Tramways Company to change the name of the Company and for other purposes.	
Greenock Burgh Order Confirmation Act 1929	20 & 21 Geo. 5. c. xiv	26 July 1929
An Act to confirm a Provisional Order under the Private Legislation Procedure (Scotland) Act 1899 relating to Greenock Burgh.
	Greenock Burgh Order 1929 Provisional Order to extend the time for the compulsory purchase of lands and the completion of certain authorised works to make further provision in relation to streets buildings and other matters and for other purposes.	
Ross and Cromarty (Dornie Bridge, &c.) Order Confirmation Act 1929	20 & 21 Geo. 5. c. xv	26 July 1929
An Act to confirm a Provisional Order under the Private Legislation Procedure (Scotland) Act 1899 relating to Ross and Cromarty (Dornie Bridge &c.).
	Ross and Cromarty (Dornie Bridge, &c.) Order 1929 Provisional Order to authorise the county council of the county of Ross and Cromarty to construct and maintain a bridge over Loch Long at Dornie and other works to re-construct extend and improve certain ferry piers in the county of Ross and Cromarty to acquire lands to borrow moneys and for other purposes.	
Ayr Burgh Order Confirmation Act 1929	20 & 21 Geo. 5. c. xvi	26 July 1929
An Act to confirm a Provisional Order under the Private Legislation Procedure (Scotland) Act 1899 relating to Ayr Burgh.
	Ayr Burgh Order 1929 Provisional Order to authorise the provost magistrates and councillors of the burgh of Ayr to provide parking places to make further provision with regard to the regulation of tents and vans and the supply of water and for other purposes.	
Dundee, Broughty Ferry and District Traction Order Confirmation Act 1929	20 & 21 Geo. 5. c. xvii	26 July 1929
An Act to confirm a Provisional Order under the Private Legislation Procedure (Scotland) Act 1899 relating to Dundee Broughty Ferry and District Traction.
	Dundee, Broughty Ferry and District Traction Order 1929 Provisional Order to authorise the Dundee Broughty Ferry and District Tramways Company to provide and run omnibuses to confer further powers upon the Company with regard to tramways and omnibuses to change the name of the Company and for other purposes.	
Dundee Corporation Order Confirmation Act 1929 (repealed)	20 & 21 Geo. 5. c. xviii	26 July 1929
An Act to confirm a Provisional Order under the Private Legislation Procedure (Scotland) Act 1899 relating to Dundee Corporation. (Repealed by Dundee Corporation (Water, Transport, Finance, &c.) Order Confirmation Act 1954 (2 & 3 Eliz. 2. c.ix))
	Dundee Corporation Order 1929 Provisional Order to authorise the Dundee Corporation to borrow money for the purpose of their omnibus undertaking to extend the Corporation's power to run omnibuses and for other purposes.	
Lanarkshire, Renfrewshire and Dunbartonshire Education Authorities Order Confirmation Act 1929 (repealed)	20 & 21 Geo. 5. c. xix	26 July 1929
An Act to confirm a Provisional Order under the Private Legislation Procedure (Scotland) Act 1899 relating to Lanarkshire Renfrewshire and Dunbartonshire Education Authorities. (Repealed by Statute Law (Repeals) Act 1995 (c. 44))
	Lanarkshire Renfrewshire and Dunbartonshire Education Authorities Order 1929 Provisional Order to make provisions of the Local Government (Adjustments) (Scotland) Act 1914 (Note: Local Government (Adjustments) (Scotland) Act 1914 (4 & 5 Geo. 5. c. 74)) applicable to section 62 of the Glasgow Boundaries Act 1925. (Note: Glasgow Boundaries Act 1925 (15 & 16 Geo. 5. c. cxxxi))	
Clyde Navigation Act 1929	20 & 21 Geo. 5. c. xx	26 July 1929
An Act to amend the provisions of the Clyde Navigation Acts 1858 to 1919 relating to rates dues tolls rents and charges to confer further powers on the Trustees of the Clyde Navigation and for other purposes.
Hendon Urban District Council Act 1929	20 & 21 Geo. 5. c. xxi	26 July 1929
An Act to provide for the extension of the urban district of Hendon to confer further powers on the Council of that district to make further and better provision for the improvement health and local government of the district and for other purposes.
Grand Junction Company Act 1929	20 & 21 Geo. 5. c. xxii	26 July 1929
An Act to provide for the reconstruction of the Grand Junction Company and its constitution as a limited company under the Companies Acts 1908 to 1917 and for other purposes.
Derby Corporation Act 1929	20 & 21 Geo. 5. c. xxiii	26 July 1929
An Act to authorise the mayor aldermen and burgesses of the borough of Derby to construct street works to acquire lands for the erection of a town hall and other purposes to make further provision with regard to their omnibus tramway water and markets undertakings and the health local government and improvement of the borough and for other purposes.
Barmouth Urban District Council Act 1929	20 & 21 Geo. 5. c. xxiv	26 July 1929
An Act to empower the Barmouth Urban District Council to construct sea walls promenades and other works to acquire the undertaking of the Barmouth Harbour Trustees to confer powers upon them with regard to electricity and further powers with regard to water and for other purposes.
London Electric, Metropolitan District and City and South London Railway Companies Act 1929	20 & 21 Geo. 5. c. xxv	26 July 1929
An Act to empower the London Electric Railway Company to execute works to confer further powers on that company and on the Metropolitan District Railway Company and the City and South London Railway Company and for other purposes.
Romford Gas Act 1929	20 & 21 Geo. 5. c. xxvi	26 July 1929
An Act to incorporate and confer powers on the Romford Gas Company.
Stoke-on-Trent Extension Act 1929	20 & 21 Geo. 5. c. xxvii	26 July 1929
An Act to extend the boundaries of the city of Stoke-on-Trent and for other purposes.
Sutton District Waterworks Act 1929	20 & 21 Geo. 5. c. xxviii	26 July 1929
An Act to authorise the Sutton District Water Company to raise additional capital to confer further powers upon the Company and for other purposes.
Edmonton Urban District Council Act 1929	20 & 21 Geo. 5. c. xxix	6 December 1929
An Act to make further and better provision for the health local government finance and improvement of the Edmonton Urban District and for other purposes.
Ministry of Health Provisional Orders Confirmation (No. 11) Act 1929	20 & 21 Geo. 5. c. xxx	6 December 1929
An Act to confirm certain Provisional Orders of the Minister of Health relating to Brighton Halifax and Upton upon Severn.
	Brighton Order 1929 Provisional Order to enable the Brighton Corporation to put in force the compulsory clauses of the Lands Clauses Acts.	
	Halifax Order 1929 Provisional Order to enable the Halifax Corporation to put in force the compulsory clauses of the Lands Clauses Acts.	
	Upton upon Severn Order 1929 Provisional Order to enable the Rural District Council of Upton upon Severn to put in force the compulsory clauses of the Lands Clauses Acts.	
Ministry of Health Provisional Orders Confirmation (No. 12) Act 1929	20 & 21 Geo. 5. c. xxxi	6 December 1929
An Act to confirm certain Provisional Orders of the Minister of Health relating to Bradford and Newbury.
	Bradford Order 1929 Provisional Order amending certain local Acts.	
	Newbury (Water) Order 1929 Provisional Order amending the Newbury Corporation Act 1925. (Note: Newbury Corporation Act 1925 (15 & 16 Geo. 5. c. c))	
Ministry of Health Provisional Order Confirmation (Knebworth Water) Act 1929 (repealed)	20 & 21 Geo. 5. c. xxxii	20 December 1929
An Act to confirm a Provisional Order of the Minister of Health relating to Knebworth Water. (Repealed by Lee Valley Water Act 1959 (7 & 8 Eliz. 2. c. li))
	Knebworth Water Order 1929 Provisional Order under the Gas and Water Works Facilities Act 1870 (Note: Gas and Water Works Facilities Act 1870 (33 & 34 Vict. c. 70)) and the Gas and Water Works Facilities Act 1870 Amendment Act 1873 (Note: Gas and Water Works Facilities Act 1870 Amendment Act 1873 (36 & 37 Vict. c. 89)) to authorise the construction and maintenance of waterworks in the Rural District of Hitchin and the supply of water in part of the Rural District of Hitchin in the County of Hertford.	
Ministry of Health Provisional Orders Confirmation (Bristol and Ross Water) Act 1929	20 & 21 Geo. 5. c. xxxiii	20 December 1929
An Act to confirm certain Provisional Orders of the Minister of Health relating to Bristol Water and Ross Water.
	Bristol Waterworks Order 1929 Provisional Order under the Gas and Water Works Facilities Act 1870 and the Gas and Water Works Facilities Act 1870 Amendment Act 1873 empowering the Bristol Waterworks Company to construct waterworks and for other purposes.	
	Ross Water Order 1929 Provisional Order under the Gas and Water Works Facilities Act 1870 and the Gas and Water Works Facilities Act 1870 Amendment Act 1873 for empowering the Undertakers under the Ross Water Order 1892 and the Ross Water Order 1898 to construct waterworks to extend the limits of supply to raise additional capital to increase the charges for water and for other purposes.	
Lanarkshire Traction Order Confirmation Act 1929	20 & 21 Geo. 5. c. xxxiv	20 December 1929
An Act to confirm a Provisional Order under the Private Legislation Procedure (Scotland) Act 1899 relating to Lanarkshire Traction.
	Lanarkshire Traction Order 1929 Provisional Order to change the name of the Lanarkshire Tramways Company to make provision as to the abandonment of the tramways owned by that Company to enlarge the powers of the Company with regard to the running of omnibuses and for other purposes.	
Astley Ainslie Institution Order Confirmation Act 1929	20 & 21 Geo. 5. c. xxxv	20 December 1929
An Act to confirm a Provisional Order under the Private Legislation Procedure (Scotland) Act 1899 relating to the Astley Ainslie Institution.
	Astley Ainslie Institution Order 1929 Provisional Order to incorporate and confer powers on the Governors of the Astley Ainslie Institution and for other purposes.	
Tyneside Tramways and Tramroads Act 1929 (repealed)	20 & 21 Geo. 5. c. xxxvi	20 December 1929
An Act to make provision as to the abandonment of the tramways and tramroads of the Tyneside Tramways and Tramroads Company to enlarge the powers of the Company with respect to the provision and running of omnibuses and for other purposes. (Repealed by Tyne & Wear Act 1980 (c. xliii))
Glasgow Corporation Act 1929	20 & 21 Geo. 5. c. xxxvii	20 December 1929
An Act to authorise the Corporation of the city of Glasgow to widen a road and reconstruct a bridge in the city to extend the time for the construction of tramways and other works to amend the provisions of the Glasgow Police Act 1866 (Note: Glasgow Police Act 1866 (29 & 30 Vict. c. cclxxiii)) with respect to stage carriages and stage coaches and for other purposes.
Birmingham Corporation (General Powers) Act 1929	20 & 21 Geo. 5. c. xxxviii	20 December 1929
An Act to empower the lord mayor aldermen and citizens of the city of Birmingham to construct street improvements and a tramway to extend their limits and those of the East Worcestershire Waterworks Company for the supply of water to enlarge their powers in regard to their savings and housing bank and to make further provision in regard to their several undertakings and to the health local government and improvement of the city and for other purposes.

== See also ==
- List of acts of the Parliament of the United Kingdom
