= Sheerness and District Tramways =

Tramway operator in England

Operation
- Locale: Sheerness
- Open: 9 April 1903
- Close: 7 July 1917
- Status: Closed

Infrastructure
- Track gauge: 3 ft 6 in (1,067 mm)
- Propulsion system: Electric

Statistics
- Route length: 2.47 miles (3.98 km)

The Sheerness and District Tramways operated a tramway service in Sheerness between 1903 and 1917.

== History ==
The system opened on 9 April 1903 with a depot located at TQ 9314 7348 near Sheerness East railway station. There were 12 tramcars obtained from Brush Electrical Engineering Company of Loughborough.

In 1904, tramcars 9-12 were sold to the City of Birmingham Tramways Company Ltd.

== Closure ==
This was the first electric tramway to close in Britain. There was a shortage of spares for its German-manufactured Siemens and Halske overhead equipment during the First World War.

Tramcars 1 to 8 were sold to Darlington Corporation Light Railways in 1917.
