= Darlington Corporation Light Railways =

Defunct English tramway company

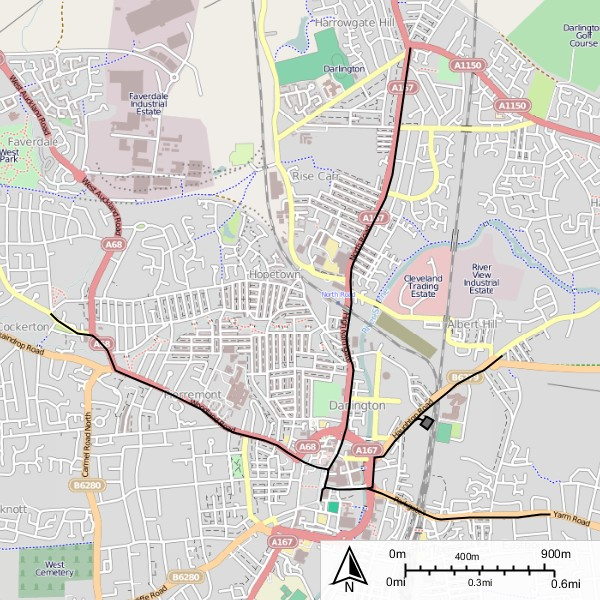
- Map of the Darlington Corporation Light Railways

Operation
- Locale: Darlington, England
- Open: 1 June 1904
- Close: 10 April 1926
- Status: Closed

Infrastructure
- Track gauge: 3 ft 6 in (1,067 mm)
- Propulsion system: Electric

Statistics
- Route length: 4.87 miles (7.84 km)

The Darlington Corporation Light Railways operated a tramway service in Darlington between 1904 and 1926.

== History ==
Darlington was the first municipality to take advantage of the Light Railways Act 1896. Its tramways were authorised by orders under this act. In preparation for the new tramway, the corporation opened a new power station in the town in December 1900.

The corporation bought out the Stockton and Darlington Steam Tramway Company which (despite its name) had been operating horse-drawn trams in Darlington since 1880. The price paid for this was £7,600. The lines were leased to C. J. O'Dowd who continued to operate them until 18 August 1903, when the service was withdrawn for reconstruction.

Kennedy and Jenkins were appointed consulting engineers, and the contractor for the permanent way was Messrs J. G. White and Company. The overhead wires were erected by Brush Electrical Equipment Company. A depot was erected in Haughton Road.

On 25 May 1904, the system was inspected by the Board of Trade and passed fit for public use. It was opened by the Mayoress Mrs A. Henderson, who drove the first car on 1 June 1904.

== Fleet ==
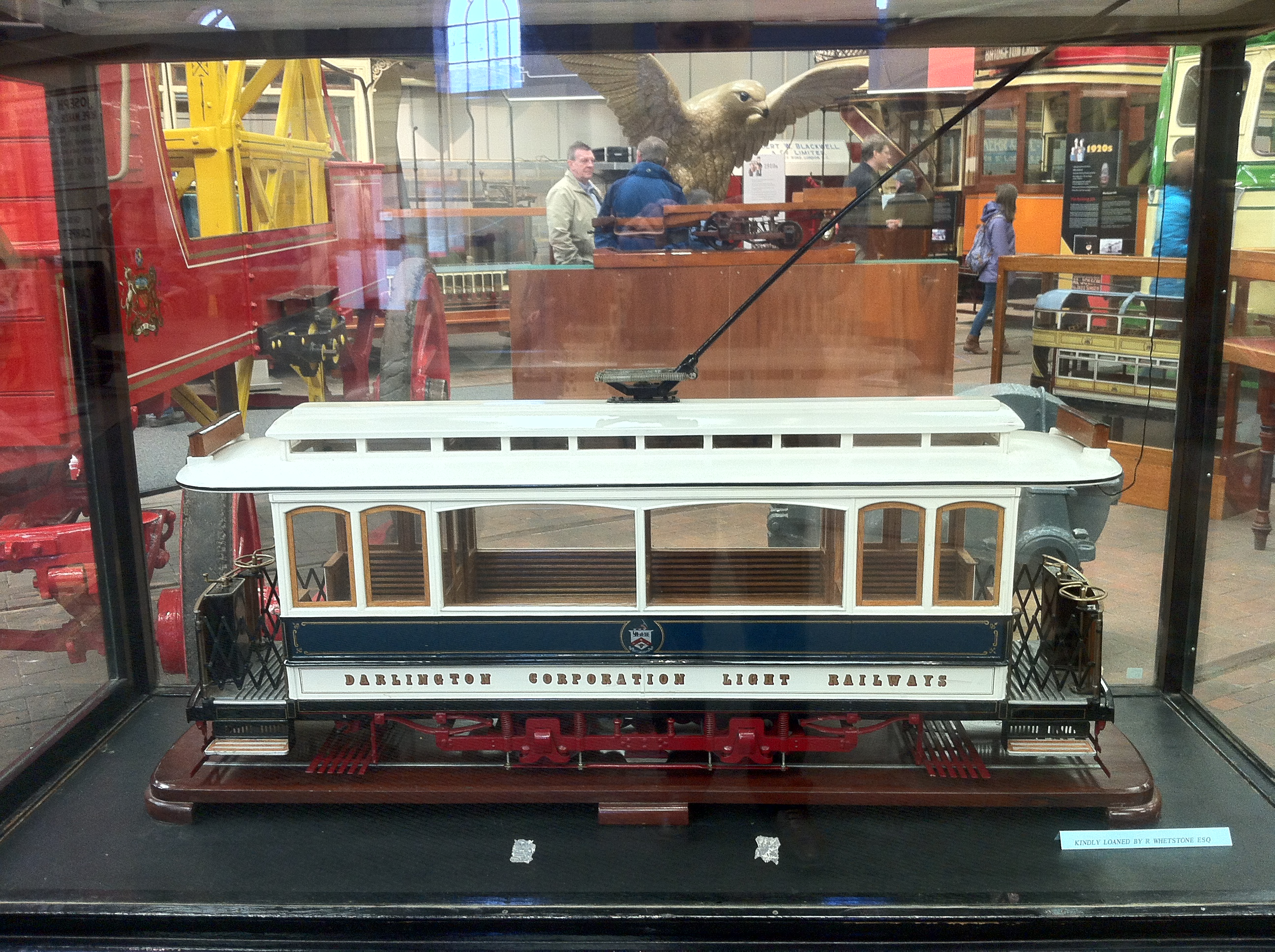
Model of a Darlington Corporation Light Railways tramcar at the National Tramway Museum

The company purchased 16 single deck cars from G.F. Milnes & Co. By 1912, the traffic had increased to such an extent that 2 double deck 56-seater cars were purchased from the United Electric Car Company of Preston.

In 1918, 8 cars were obtained second hand from the Sheerness and District Tramways, which had closed the previous year. Six of these were put into service, and the remainder were used for spare parts. They were originally built by Brush Electrical Machines.

== Closure ==
The system closed on 10 April 1926. The services were replaced by the Darlington trolleybus system.

The 24 tramcars were offered for sale, the two double deck cars were sold to Dover Corporation Tramways for £350 the pair.
