= Halifax Corporation Tramways =

Tramway operator in England

Operation
- Locale: Halifax
- Open: 9 June 1898
- Close: 14 February 1939
- Status: Closed

Infrastructure
- Track gauge: 3 ft 6 in (1,067 mm)
- Propulsion system: Electric
- Depots: Spring Hall, Pellon, and Skircoat Road

Statistics
- Route length: 39.07 miles (62.88 km)

Halifax Corporation Tramways operated a tramway service in Halifax, West Yorkshire, England between 1898 and 1939. After considering lifts and inclined planes to assist trams in negotiating the steep hills to the south of the town, they obtained permission to build a conventional system in 1897, and the first three routes opened in 1898. By 1905 there were 37 miles (60 km) of track and 96 tramcars, supplied by two manufacturers. In 1921, an additional route was added to the system, and the corporation embarked on a programme of building their own tramcars, some of which replaced existing vehicles, while some extended the fleet. During the 1930s, the trams were gradually replaced by motor buses, either run by the Corporation or by private companies, and the last tram ran on 14 February 1939.

The corporation also looked at running trolleybuses in 1903, but no action was taken. However, they bought two little-used vehicles from Dundee in 1918, and opened a short route in 1921. The experiment was not entirely successful, as the vehicles suffered damage as a result of the poor condition of the roads. A new vehicle was bought in 1924, but the system was abandoned in 1926, when the general manager was replaced by someone who had previously managed the Dundee system, and did not like trolleybuses.

== History ==
Halifax Corporation Tramways Act 1897
- Act of Parliament
- Parliament of the United Kingdom
- Long title: An Act to empower the Mayor Aldermen and Burgesses of the Borough of Halifax to construct Tramways in the Borough and for other purposes.
- Citation: 60 & 61 Vict. c. xciv

Dates
- Royal assent: 15 July 1897

Other legislation
- Repealed by: West Yorkshire Act 1980

Status: Repealed

Text of statute as originally enacted

Halifax was not easy territory in which to build a tramway, as Salterhebble Hill, one of the main routes to the south of the town centre, rose at 1 in 9.6. Consideration was given to building a lift, onto which the tramcars would run, or of building an inclined plane, on which the tramcar would be carried by trolley. Such systems had been used in Pittsburg and Cincinnati, but after two failures to obtain permission to proceed, Halifax Corporation succeeded in obtaining the Halifax Corporation Tramways Act 1897 (60 & 61 Vict. c. xciv), which authorised the building of a conventional electric tramway system with a gauge of 3 ft 6 in (1,067 mm). Construction took place rapidly, and on 9 June 1898 three single-track routes with a total mileage of 3.5 miles (5.6 km) opened. These radiated out from the Post Office, and ran along Horton Street to Halifax railway station, to King Cross Street, and along Gibbet Street, where a depot was built for the tramcars, to reach High Road Well.

For the opening of the tramway, the Corporation bought ten open top double deck cars, from G. F. Milnes & Co. of Birkenhead. Expansion of the system was also quite rapid, with a further 48 cars being bought from Milnes over the next two years. The depot proved to be too small, and a new one was built at Skircoat Road, while the Gibbet Street depot became an engineering workshop. The next batch of open top double deck cars came from Brush Electrical Engineering Company, with 12 bought in 1901, 12 in 1902 and 12 more in 1903. Brush was again approached to supply two single deck vehicles, designed for one-man operation, in 1904, and by 1905 there were 37 miles (60 km) of track. The tramcars were fitted with runback brakes, and track brakes were also fitted, but despite this, there were a number of accidents on the steep gradients. In the ten years after 1905, top covers were fitted to most of the open top tramcars, although car 64 did not receive one, as it was destroyed in an accident in 1907. Brush supplied six new top covered double deck vehicles in 1912, which were numbered 97 to 102. The two single deck trams performed special duties during the First World War, with number 95 acting as an army recruiting office, while number 96 was used as a mobile kitchen.

A new route to Stainland was opened on 14 May 1921, and apart from some small extensions and modifications to the trackwork, the system was more or less complete. The corporation then embarked on a programme of building their own tramcars, twelve of which replaced cars withdrawn from service. The replacement vehicles consisted of a single deck car to replace number 96, which was subsequently converted to an open top double deck car, five open topped vehicles and six top covered cars. In 1924 the fleet was increased when they built three single deck bogie cars, followed by a top covered car which was outshopped in a new livery. Another eleven top covered cars were built in 1928–29, and the final purchase of new cars was a batch of ten similar vehicles from the English Electric Company. The fleet was made up to its maximum size of 131 trams by the purchase of four second hand trams from Exeter Corporation in 1931.

The first part of the system to be closed was the 1.5-mile (2.4 km) route between Bailiff Bridge and Brighouse, which ran along Bradford Road. This was double track, and linked to the Bradford system and the Huddersfield system. The systems were not physically connected, as they used a wider gauge than the 3 ft 6 in (1,067 mm) of the Halifax system. Bradford used a gauge of 4 ft (1,219 mm) while Huddersfield used 4 ft 7 3/4 in (1,416 mm). Through the 1930s, the tram services were gradually replaced by motor buses run by the corporation or by private companies. The last section to be closed was that from the depot to the town centre, on which services were withdrawn on 14 February 1939, with the final tram being number 109.

=== Trolleybuses ===
In 1903, consideration was given to using trolleybuses to extend the tramway network to serve less populous areas, where the cost of building a tramway could not be justified. Although the tramways committee decided to ask for tenders to construct such a system, no further action was taken at the time, and the increased reliability of motor buses resulted in any action being deferred when the issue was raised subsequently. However, neighbouring towns were adopting the idea, as Leeds began running trolleybuses in June 1911, Bradford followed four days later, and Keighley's system opened in May 1913. Dundee in Scotland had run trolleybuses from 1912 to 1914, but had withdrawn them due to the poor condition of the roads and when their two vehicles were offered for sale, Halifax decided to experiment with the new form of transport. They visited Dundee in December 1917, and bought the vehicles in January 1918, but construction of a trial route had to wait until the end of the First World War.

They selected an existing motor bus route for the trial, running from Pellon to Wainstalls via Mount Tabor. Contracts for the construction of the overhead lines were awarded in 1919, and the trolleybuses were overhauled at the works on Skircoat Road. The vehicles were numbered 103 and 104 in the tram series, and the Ministry of Transport inspected the new route in June 1921. Public services began on 20 July 1921, on what was really a country lane for most of the route, and as in Dundee, the trolleybuses did not fare well on the rough road surfaces. The manager was complaining about damage to the vehicles within two months of the system opening, and roadworks were put in hand. By 1923, the condition of the trolleybuses was poor, and they bought a chassis with motors from Tilling-Stevens of Maidstone, on which the tramways department built a single deck body with a front entrance. It was numbered 2, and entered service in June 1924. Number 103 probably took the number 1 at this point, as trams with the numbers 103 and 104 were added to the fleet in 1925 and 1921. Trolleybus 104 was withdrawn from service, but retained.

Motor bus technology and comfort continued to improve, and justifying the retention of such a small trolleybus system became increasingly difficult. Matters got worse when the manager, Ben Hall, left the company after four years service in 1926, and his successor was Walter Young, who had managed the Dundee Tramway since 1921. Young was keen to retain the trams, but he closed down the trolleybus route on 24 October 1926. The electricity committee advocated using trolleybuses again when the tramway system was being closed in 1936, but the manager of the time, G. F. Craven, ruled that electricity costs would be too great, because of the gradients that needed to be negotiated.

== Fleet ==
Trams

Halifax Corporation owned a total of six single deck and 137 double deck tramcars during the life of the system. However, they never owned this number at the same time, as one single deck and 11 double deck cars were built by the Corporation to replace original cars that were withdrawn.

Car numbers	Type	Year built	Builder	Notes
1–10	double deck open top	1898	Milnes	
11–58	double deck open top	1899–1900	Milnes	
59–70	double deck open top	1901	Brush	64 destroyed in accident 1907
71–82	double deck open top	1902	Brush	
83–94	double deck open top	1903	Brush	
95–96	single deck one-man operated	1904	Brush	
97–102	double deck top covered	1912	Brush	
96	single deck	1921?	Halifax Corp	replaced orig 96, later converted to double deck open top
9, 11, 17, 64, 80	double deck open top	1921–27	Halifax Corp	replaced orig cars with these numbers
71, 73, 75, 76, 81, 92	double deck top covered	1921–1927	Halifax Corp	replaced orig cars with these numbers
103, 105, 106	single deck twin bogie	1924	Halifax Corp	
104	double deck enclosed	1924	Halifax Corp	
107–113, 124–127	double deck top covered	1928–29	Halifax Corp	
114–123	double deck top covered	1930 or 31	English Electric	
128–131	double deck open top	1929	Brush	Bought 1931 from Exeter (1–4)

Trolleybuses

Numbers 103 and 104 had been built in 1912 for Dundee Corporation, but were withdrawn after less than two years. They were bought by Halifax in January 1918.

Car numbers	Type	In service	Withdrawn	Chassis	Electrical equipment	Bodywork
103	single deck 2-axle	1921	1926	Railless Electric Co	Siemens	Milnes Voss B28R
104	single deck 2-axle	1921	1924	Railless Electric Co	Siemens	Milnes Voss B28R
2	single deck 2-axle	1924	1926	Tilling-Stevens	Bull	Halifax Transport dept B28F

Bus bodywork designations: key
Prefixes

U	Wartime utility bodywork
B	Bus body single deck
C	Coach body single deck
D	Dual purpose single deck
H	Highbridge body, central upper gangway
L	Lowbridge body, offset sunken upper gangway

Numbers

n	Single deck or total seating
x / y	Upper deck followed by lower deck seating

Suffixes

C	Centre entrance
F	Front entrance
R	Rear entrance
D	Dual entrance

== Bibliography ==
- Joyce, J; King, J S; Newman, G (1986). British Trolleybus Systems. Ian Allan. ISBN 978-0-7110-1647-7.
- Klapper, Charles (1974). The Golden Age of Tramways (2nd ed.). David & Charles. ISBN 978-0-7153-6458-1.
- Turner, Keith (1996). The Directory of British Tramways. Patrick Stephens. ISBN 978-1-85260-549-0.
