= Dundee Corporation Tramways =

Tram system in Dundee, Scotland

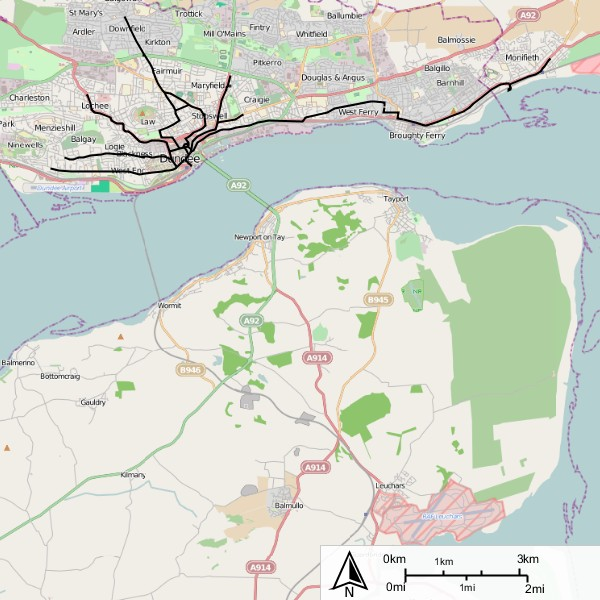
- Map of the routes of tramways in the Dundee area

Operation
- Locale: Dundee
- Open: 1 June 1899
- Close: 20 October 1956
- Status: Closed

Infrastructure
- Track gauge: 1,435 mm (4 ft 8 1/2 in) standard gauge
- Propulsion system: Electric
- Depots: Walrond Street, Maryfield

Statistics
- Route length: 15.15 miles (24.38 km)

Dundee Corporation Tramways formerly served the City of Dundee in Scotland. The corporation had financed the construction of a horse tramway in 1877, but had then leased it to the Dundee and District Tramways Company. They had replaced most of the horse trams with steam tram locomotives pulling trailer cars from 1884, but in 1897 the corporation decided that it would run the tramway system itself. After some negotiation and the payment of compensation, they took over the system in 1899, with a view to electrifying it. Electric trams started running in 1900, and the changeover was completed in 1902.

There was gradual expansion over the next twenty-five years, both by the opening of additional routes, and the acquisition of new tramcars, with the final batch of trams being purchased in 1930 for use on the Lochee route. The corporation started to run motor buses in 1922, and some of the tram routes were replaced by buses from 1928, but the official policy was that the trams would be retained, and a programme of rebuilding them was carried out. By the end of the Second World War, there were 56 trams in service, somewhat lower than the peak of over 100 trams, but heavy repairs to the infrastructure and new vehicles were then required, and the decision was taken to shut the system down. Closures occurred in 1952, 1955 and 1956, with the last tram running on 20 October 1956.

The corporation had also been an early pioneer in the use of trolleybuses, having visited systems in Germany in 1908. A single route linking the tramways at Maryfield with those as Fairmuir was opened in 1912, but although the technology was successful, the roads were unsuitable for the vehicles, and there were complaints about the amount of dust created, and the bumpiness of the ride. After less than two years, the service was withdrawn on 13 May 1914, making it the first trolleybus system in Britain to be shut down.

== History ==
Horse-drawn trams were first introduced in Dundee in 1877. They were promoted by the Dundee Trawmway and Omnibus Company, but construction was managed by the police commissioners, and when the system was completed, it was leased to the Dundee and District Tramways Company. Following some expansion of the system, the company experimented with a steam tram in 1880, and in 1884 bought the first two steam tram locomotives and a second-hand trailer car. The first public steam tram service ran on 20 June 1885, and most but not all of the horse trams were gradually replaced by steam tram locomotives pulling trailer cars, some of which were bought new, while others were made from pairs of redundant horse trams. By the mid-1890s, there were 13 tram locomotives and ten trailer cars operating on the system, as well as ten double-deck horse trams.

In 1893, the original lease ran out, and the corporation renewed it for a further 14 years. However, in 1897, they decided that they would prefer to run the tramway themselves, and so started negotiations to see if this might be possible. The two parties agreed that the corporation would pay for the trams, buildings and plant, based on an estimate of their value by a third party, and would also pay £2,100 per year in compensation, from the date of takeover, which was 1 June 1899, until the original end date of the lease in May 1907. The process of upgrading the lines to allow electric trams to run began soon after the takeover, and on 12 July 1900, the horse trams stopped working the Perth Road route, and electric trams began public service. The Lochee route followed suit on 22 October 1900. Work then began on converting the rest of the system, and the steam trams running on the Fairmuir route were the last to be replaced, when they were replaced on 14 May 1902. Services on the Baxter Park line were suspended, and that route did not reopen until 20 August 1906. Some minor sections in the central area were abandoned, and there were some extensions to the system at the outer edges.

In order to operate the services, which ran on standard gauge 4 ft 8 1/2 in (1,435 mm) track, the corporation ordered ten bogie double-deck cars with open tops from the Electric Railway and Tramway Carriage Works of Preston. The trams were stabled in the Lochee Depot, and were subsequently fitted with top covers. These were followed by eight trams purchased from G. F. Milnes & Co. of Birkenhead in 1902, which were also open topped double deck vehicles, and were later fitted with top covers. At the same time they obtained six bogie combination cars, with a central saloon and open ends, which were the only single deck vehicles to run on the system, and were supplied by Hurst Nelson and Company of Motherwell. Once the changeover to electric traction was completed in 1902, the steam trams were disposed of. Several of the trailer cars were sold at an auction, which took place at Lochee depot on 24 July 1902. The corporation retained two of the tram locomotives, which were used as snowploughs until 1934.

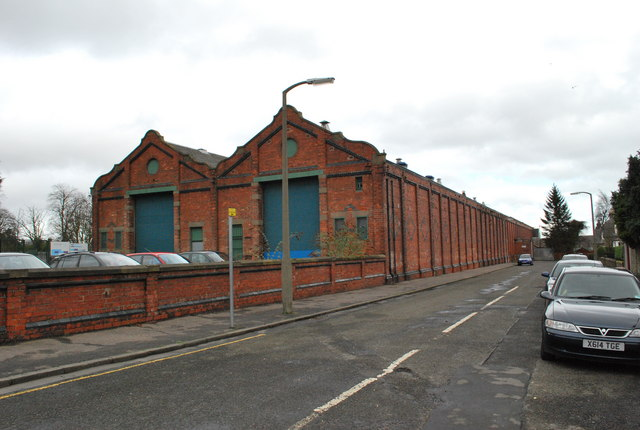
Maryfield tram sheds

On 20 November 1902, a new line was opened, linking the Fairmuir route to Hilltown, while in 1903 the new Maryfield Depot was opened. It was located on Forfar Road in Stobswell, and was built of red and blue brick with curved gables. When first built, it provided stabling for 12 trams, but was later extended to hold 70 vehicles. Some short extensions to the system were opened in 1907, and in 1908 a line to Craig Pier on the River Tay began operating. Five more double-deck trams, this time with covered tops, were added to the fleet, two from Brush Electrical Engineering Company of Loughboprough in 1907 and three from G. C. Milnes, Voss and Company of Birkenhead in 1908. The corporation also tried running trolleybuses in 1912, but the service was short-lived and closed again in 1914. Several more short extensions to the tramway network followed, but the line to Craig Pier was closed on 1 June 1919, as it was not profitable.

The corporation continued to expand the fleet, adding four top-covered cars in 1916, 14 in 1920/21, nine totally enclosed cars between 1923 and 1925, and ten totally enclosed cars with wider bodies for the Lochee route in 1930. They also started to run motor buses in 1922, which gradually replaced some of the trams, with the Constitution Road route being the first to be replaced by buses on 26 February 1928. Although short, this route included a section with a gradient of 1-in-9, and was operated by the single deck bogie trams, which were powered by four motors. The next route to close was that to Belsize Road, to the east of Dundee, which was replaced by buses on 16 May 1931. This had provided a link to the Dundee, Broughty Ferry and District Tramways system since it opened in 1905, and on which there was through running. This had developed into a through service running from Lochee to Monifieth in 1922, but in 1931 the corporation had bought that entire system, and closed it all on the same day as they closed their link to it.

Despite such closures, the official policy as stated by Robert Taylor, the general manager, was that trams would remain a major component of transport in Dundee, and this continued to be the position until the early 1950s. Taylor reduced the fleet from 99 to 60 trams, but he implemented a major rebuilding programme for those that were left. The new trams for the Lochee route were supplied with EMB swing-axle trucks, manufactured by the Electro-Mechanical Brake Company of West Bromwich, which gave a much smoother ride, and caused less wear of the track. This type of truck was fitted to the trams as they were rebuilt, while other improvements included air brakes and Fischer bow collectors, which increased the contact area between the overhead wire and the collector, reducing both wear and noise. There were several sizes of rebuilt trams, but the largest, which ran on four-wheel trucks, were designed with seating for 68 passengers. However, because a large number of passengers made short journeys, six seats were subsequently removed, to increase the free space for those boarding and alighting.

By the end of the Second World War, the system still had 56 trams in working order, and traffic levels were high. As renewals of the tramcars and infrastructure became necessary, the general manager, W. I. Russell, reviewed the options meticulously, and decided that the future lay with motor buses. The first part of the changeover was the closure of the Moncur Crescent route on 26 April 1952, although trams continued to run on days when there was a football match. The Blackness route was the next to succumb, on 26 November 1955, and the Downfield route closed a few hours later in the early morning of 27 November. The rest of the system closed on 20 October 1956, although there was a farewell procession of trams from Maryfield Depot to Lochee early the next morning. The final car to run in public service was car 23, and following withdrawal, the tramcars were taken to Marchbanks and burnt, so that the metal could be sold for scrap.

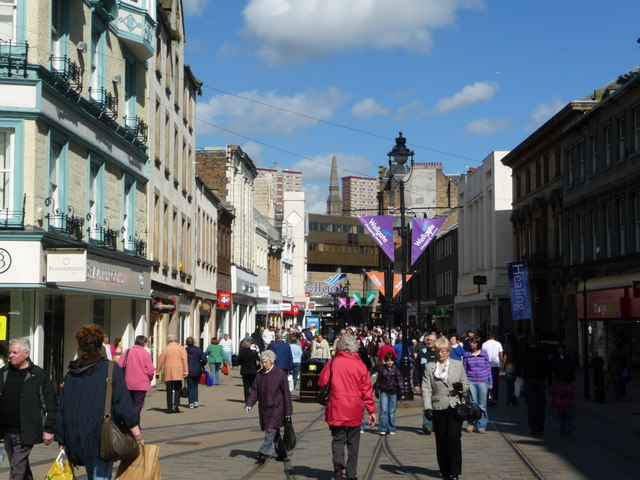
Track in situ on Murraygate, Dundee, after a pedestrianisation scheme

== Trolleybuses ==
Dundee was an early advocate of the trolleybus after a deputation visited Germany in 1908 to view trackless systems there. They were convinced that trackless vehicles were entirely feasible, and recommended that one would be installed on the Clepington Road, between Forfar Road in Maryfield and Strathmartine Road in Fairmuir. Both termini were on existing tramway routes. They suggested that it could be extended to Lochee, and ultimately form a large ring via the docks, the Esplanade and Ninewells. Despite the enthusiasm of the delegation, the city council did not start work on the system until 1911, when construction of the Clepington Road link commenced. The route was almost straight, with a turning circle at both ends. The eastern terminus at Maryfield was to the north of Maryfield Depot, and to allow the cars to reach the start of their route, they ran along the tramway using one trolley pole and a skate that ran on the tram tracks.

Lieutenant-Colonel von Donop carried out an inspection of the system on behalf of the Board of Trade on 3 September 1912, and it was passed for public service, although he had not previously seen such a system. On 5 September, the route opened for public use, and some 1,200 passengers used it on the first day. Two vehicles were purchased from Railless Electric Traction, and carried the numbers 67 and 68. The bodywork was by Milnes Voss of Birkenhead, and had seats for 28 passengers, with an open platform at the rear. Each car was powered by two motors, supplied by Siemens. The vehicles were praised by the Dundee Courier.

While the technology worked, the roads on which they ran were unsuitable. People complained about the bumpiness of the ride, and in dry weather, the amount of dust thrown up was also a cause for concern. By 1914, local residents thought they were an 'intolerable nuisance', again largely because of the dust they created, and the service was withdrawn on 13 May 1914. The tramways committee agreed to share the cost of rebuilding the road with the works committee. The system thus became the first trolleybus system in Britain to be abandoned. The two vehicles were stored in Maryfield Depot until 1919, when they were sold to the Halifax system.

== Successor company ==
The system was publicly owned and operated by Dundee Corporation, which subsequently became the present Dundee City Council. When it closed, the trams were replaced by Dundee Corporation diesel buses. After local government reorganisation in 1975 the Dundee Corporation Transport Department was transferred to Tayside Regional Council. Following deregulation and privatisation, the successor company was Travel Dundee which was later rebranded as National Express Dundee and in 2015 as Xplore Dundee.

== Fleet ==
=== Trams ===
The following table shows some of the electric trams that were built for the Dundee Corporation system. Numbers are the original numbers applied to the cars, as the fleet was renumbered more than once. All of the remaining cars were rebuilt in the 1930s. The entire fleet was believed to be scrapped in 1956 after the system closed. However, in 2026 one of tramcars was rediscovered on an allotment, where it was believed to have been since the 1950s. It's number is unknown but it is thought to be one of the 1908 Milnes tramcars. It is planned to be displayed at the new Dundee Transport Museum, which is set to open in 2027.

Car numbers	Type	Year built	Builder	Notes
1-10	double-deck open top	1900	ERTCW	later top covered
41-48	double-deck open top	1902	Milnes	later top covered
49-54	single-deck bogie combination	1902	Hurst Nelson	
55, 60	double-deck covered	1907	Brush	
61-63	double-deck covered	1908	Milnes, Voss	
75-78	double-deck covered	1916	Hurst Nelson	
67, 68, 79-90	double-deck covered	1920/21	Hurst Nelson	
91-99	double-deck enclosed	1923-25	Dundee Corporation	
19-28	double-deck enclosed	1930	Brush	wide-bodied for Lochee route

After closure in 1956 two tram cars were offered for preservation. One was one of the batch of ten trams built by Brush in 1930. The other was one of two single-deck works cars numbered RW1 and RW2. These had originally been part of the batch of six trams built by Brush and delivered to Dundee in 1907. In 1935 these two had been cut down and converted for use as repair wagons. Ultimately, with no suitable storage sites being available, neither tram was able to be preserved and they were scrapped along with the majority of the remaining fleet.

=== Trolleybuses ===
Dundee owned a total of two trolleybuses during the brief life of the system, which were sold for further use in Halifax after withdrawal.

Car numbers	Type	In service	Withdrawn	Chassis	Electrical equipment	Bodywork
67-68	single-deck two-axle	1912	1914	Railless Electric Co.	Siemens	Milnes Voss B28R

Bus bodywork designations: key
Prefixes

U	Wartime utility bodywork
B	Bus body single deck
C	Coach body single deck
D	Dual purpose single deck
H	Highbridge body, central upper gangway
L	Lowbridge body, offset sunken upper gangway

Numbers

n	Single deck or total seating
x / y	Upper deck followed by lower deck seating

Suffixes

C	Centre entrance
F	Front entrance
R	Rear entrance
D	Dual entrance

== See also ==
- History of Dundee
- Dundee Museum of Transport
- National Tramway Museum
- Scottish Tramway and Transport Society
