= Dover Corporation Tramways =

UK tramway operator (1897–1936)

Dover Corporation Tramways was the operator of the second tramway system built in the United Kingdom. It was in operation from 1897 to 1936. The worst ever tram accident in the United Kingdom occurred on the system in 1917.

== History ==
=== Construction ===
On 9 November 1895, a special meeting of Dover Town Council was held. The subject of the meeting was whether or not to apply to the Board of Trade for authorisation to construct tramways in the Borough of Dover. Nineteen of the twenty-one members of the council voted in favour of the motion. Permission was duly granted by the Dover Corporation Tramways Order 1896 under the Tramways Orders Confirmation (No. 1) Act 1896 (59 & 60 Vict. c. cxx) for a total of 3 miles 6 chains (4.9 km) of line to be built. The lines were to be of 3 ft 6 in (1,067 mm) gauge and no vehicle was to exceed 6 feet (1.83 m) in width.

In July 1896, the Town Clerk and Borough Surveyor were instructed to prepare a report into various methods of tramway traction, and the surveyor was also instructed to prepare plans and specifications for the first lines that were to be built. Gas-powered trams were considered, but it was decided that electric traction would be adopted. Dick, Kerr & Company were the successful tenderers for the construction of electrical equipment and rails – their first such contract. Construction of the lines was to be by J J Briggs & Co of Blackburn, Lancashire.

Construction had started by March 1897, and after a Board of Trade inspection of the system between Buckland Bridge and the Harbour Station on 24 August the first driver training runs took place.

=== Opening ===
The official opening ceremony was on 6 September 1897, when the mayor drove tram No.3 from the Town Hall to Buckland, then to the Harbour Station and back to the Town Hall. A single tram was in public service for the rest of the day. The next day three cars were in service, with a 15-minute gap between trams as there was a lack of trained drivers.

Completion of the Folkestone Road line did not occur until November, and a trial run by tram No.7 took place on 1 December. Following a Board of Trade inspection on 10 December, the line was opened through to Maxton by the end of the month. Depots were provided at Buckland and Maxton. Initially, ten trams were provided, of which two were trailers. Both of these had been converted to powered trams by June 1898. The system had cost £28,000 to construct, and in its first year of operation 1,794,905 passengers were carried, giving a profit of £1,300.

=== Early years ===
By April 1898, trams had ceased to run past Strond Street into Clarence Place as the operation of the railway between Dover Harbour station and Dover Marine station caused much delay to trams trying to use that section of track, although the service was later restored. Two more trams were ordered that month. The first of the new cars was delivered in June 1898, when it was announced that a total of five more trams was on order. The new trams would allow a five-minute service on the Buckland route and a ten-minute service on the Maxton route. Although a through service from Maxton to the harbour was asked for, it was not possible to provide this as doing so would have exceeded the capacity of the line to handle the traffic.

The third pair of new trams (Nos.15 & 16) was delivered in May 1899. These had been manufactured in America by JG Brill Company. In November, a proposal to include the Dover system in a tramway linking Hastings and Ramsgate was opposed by the council. The scheme was quickly dropped through a lack of support. In March 1900, complaints were received that trams at Maxton were not running past the depot and an instruction was issued that this practise should cease. A track cleaning tram was authorised to be purchased in May 1900.

In November 1901, proposals were put forward to extend the system to River and Martin Mill via St Margarets Bay. Both schemes were approved, but the St Margarets Bay Light Railway was not built. A further new tram was ordered in June 1902. In May 1903, Alderman Adcock suggested that part of the revenue should be set aside to provide for major renewals of track, vehicles and equipment. This request was rejected as it was claimed that the system was in excellent repair and any future renewals would be paid for by a fresh loan. This policy was to cause the system to fall into disrepair in later years. In April 1904, the purchase of a top cover was authorised, and this was fitted to tram No.14. A poll was held in the town on the subject of Sunday services, but opinion was against their introduction at the time.

=== Expansion ===
In November 1904 the purchase of four additional trams was authorised, along with the provision of slipper brakes on the eighteen existing trams and new trolley standards for eight trams. On 20 December a special meeting of the council approved the extension to River. The tender of the British Electrical Equipment Company for construction of the double track line at a cost of £10,353 was accepted. Dick, Kerr & Company's tender for four new trams at a cost of £575 each was also accepted. It was commented in the Dover Express that more covered cars should be provided but the cover fitted to No.14 was not successful as it was too heavy. It was eventually removed and converted to an office at the Maxton depot. The new trams were delivered on 19 May 1905 and the new line at Crabble Hill was under construction by June. By September the line was complete enough for a Board of Trade inspection. The official opening of the extension was on 2 October.

=== Consolidation ===
In 1909, the level crossing at the Crosswall was again the cause of a dispute. The railway company had renewed their track, but had not reinstated the tramway, arguing that this was not their responsibility. In March 1911, Sunday services were introduced. In 1912, a new siding was constructed at New Bridge to hold trams ready to take passengers after band performances on the Sea Front or at Granville Gardens. In July 1911, three new trams were purchased at a cost of £1,830. They were delivered in 1912. In June 1913, the track cleaning tram was adapted to enable it to water the streets where it ran. The track was by this time in a poor condition. A report estimated a repair cost of £3,477. A decision was made to spend £1,500 on the most urgent repairs, with the rest to be done as soon as possible.

=== The First World War ===
The war led to a shortage of both materials for renewal of the track and spares for the trams. With the start of air raids, the service was cut back so that all trams were in the depot by 10pm. The question of a through service from Maxton to the Pier was again raised in 1916, but it was decided not to introduce this. On 19 August 1917, an accident occurred when tram No.20 ran away down Crabble Hill and overturned at the bottom of the hill. Eleven passengers were killed and sixty were injured. As a consequence of the accident, the use of the top deck was banned on Crabble Hill. In order to provide materials for the repair of the worst sections of track, 940 yards (860 m) of track in Lewisham Road, River was lifted in November 1917, and that section of line reduced to a single line. Manager E C Carden was criticised at the time for the state of the system. He replied that the problems were down to shortage of spares and manpower caused by the war. Although about half the trams were unserviceable, only tram No.17 had been off the road for an excessive amount of time. Some of the trams were running on one motor. Shortly after this, Mr Carden resigned on grounds of ill-health and Mr E H Bond was appointed manager in his place. Bond had previously been with the Isle of Thanet and Colchester Tramways.

In October 1918, a report by Dick, Kerr & Company was presented to the Council. It stated that the whole system was in very bad condition, with the track and overhead wiring needing replacement. Only about half of the fleet were in serviceable condition, with some of the early cars having been cannibalised in order to keep others running.

=== New management ===
Mr Bond obtained authority to fit a set of steel wheels with removable tyres to one of the trams. It was found to be an improvement on the cast iron wheels in use, which easily developed flats. The horse-drawn tower wagon was worn out, and a new one was purchased at a cost of £115 from the Electrical and Engineering Co. The overhead wiring was replaced, with new trolley poles where necessary. The suspension of the trams was also modernised where necessary.

The ban on passengers using the top deck of trams on Crabble Hill was lifted in April 1919. The restoration of the double track at River was asked for, as were three new trams and provision of workshop facilities at the Buckland depot. The manager was asked to report on an extension of the system from Crabble, via Kearsney and London Road, thus making a loop at that part of the system. When the council was told that it would cost £34,556 they immediately dropped the scheme. The purchase of three new trams was authorised, funded by a loan of £6,000 over fifteen years. Although negotiations were commenced in December 1920 to purchase land at Buckland for provision of workshops, agreement could not be reached and the scheme never got off the ground. All maintenance continuing to be done at the small Maxton depot. In 1921, the manager asked that the responsibility for the permanent way be transferred from the Borough Engineer's Department to himself. There were complaints that the system of repairs and renewals employed by the Borough Engineer was causing operational problem and complaints from residents affected by noisy track. The council decided to maintain the status quo having heard from the Borough Engineer. Much track repair and renewal was done about this time.

=== The early 1920s ===
In October 1921, the manager again asked for the renewal of the double track at River, and for two new lines. The first was to be along Priory Road, which would have enabled a service between Maxton and River avoiding Worthington Street, and enabled easier transfer of trams between depots. The second was an extension to serve Dover Marine station. He again asked for the provision of workshop facilities at the Buckland depot.

In November 1921, the Borough Engineer's report said that the extension to Dover Marine station would cost £16,000. It was suggested that ”trackless trams” should be installed instead. In April 1922, a trolleybus was demonstrated in the town but it did not impress the council. Track repairs and renewals were done in Tower Hamlets and on the Folkestone Road that winter.

In April 1923, the question of a through service between Maxton and the Pier was again raised. Provision of such a service would have meant renewal of the track and overhead at the Worthington Street junction, which was in poor condition and made even empty stock working between the two depots difficult. The proposal was again turned down. In July, the council addressed the question of the long-term policy for transport within the Borough. Proposals were made to obtain powers to run buses or trolleybuses but these met strong opposition amongst the townsfolk.

An accident occurred on Crabble Hill on 21 September when a tram ran away down the hill and derailed on the points at the bottom and had a head-on collision with another tram. Despite much broken glass, there were no serious injuries. The two trams were repaired and returned to service. In June 1924, the track in the High Street was renewed at a cost of £2,450.

=== The mid-1920s ===
In the autumn of 1924 the manager asked for more new trams. Most of the trams in service were in good condition, except for a few of the earliest trams which he considered were not worth spending money repairing. There were concerns that the top decks of some of the oldest trams may collapse. Discussions were held about the future of the system and it was again suggested that the Kearsney loop should be built. It was now estimated that this would cost £10,000 to construct and three new trams required at a cost of £5,250. A suggestion was put forward that the tram system should be cut back to New Bridge and that buses or trolleybuses should run through to Dover Marine station. The council decided to authorise the renewal of all track below New Bridge and to continue the service to Crosswall.

In April 1925, an inspection of the trams took place. Tram No.2, having been out of traffic for many years was ordered to be scrapped, with the body being converted to a waiting room. £100 was authorised to be spent on repairs to No.6 and No.13, and £50 on No.14. The body of No.2 was duly converted and served as a waiting room at South Road, River.

In June 1925, proposals were again put forward for buses or trolleybuses and the track renewals were postponed. After the summer recess, it was decided to authorise a loan of £7,184 for track renewals, including the rebuilding of the Worthington Street junction. In February 1926, tram No.13 re-entered traffic, having been rebuilt at a cost of £216. Authority was given for trams No.15 and 16 to be rebuilt.

=== Secondhand stock ===
In the autumn of 1926, it was announced by the general manager that although six new motors had been bought, new trams were still needed. Tram No.20's body was in a dangerous condition. The council authorised the purchase of two secondhand trams from Darlington at a cost of £500, including some spares. These trams took numbers 8 and 9 in the Dover fleet. After problems with worn drive gear were rectified, the trams became popular on the service to Maxton.

In January 1927, the surviving original cars were condemned and it was decided to purchase five trams from the recently defunct West Hartlepool system at a cost of £850 including spares. These trams took numbers 1 – 5 in the Dover Fleet. Tram No.15 re-entered traffic and No.16 was under overhaul at this time. The scrapping of original trams 3 – 7, 10 – 12 and 14 was authorised, the bodies of some being used as shelters at various municipal sports grounds.

In July 1928, an evening postal collection was instituted on the 8.30pm tram from River. In December 1928, two secondhand trams were purchased from the Birmingham and Midland Joint Committee, with three top covers at a total cost of £450. The new trams took numbers 11 and 12 and the top covers were fitted to trams 25 – 27. Trams 22 – 24 were withdrawn from traffic so that their bodies could be rebuilt. The introduction of the new cars meant that some alterations had to be made to the overhead wiring and support poles.

In September 1929, Dover Harbour Board announced an alteration of the docks, with the result that some track alterations were carried out in Snargate Street. In May 1930, tram No.17 was withdrawn, and one of the others was described as "almost beyond useful service". Five second-hand trams were purchased from the Birmingham and Midland Joint Committee at a cost of £800. These trams took numbers 6 – 7, 10, 14 and 17 in the fleet.

In the winter of 1930, track renewals at Dover Priory station were carried out at a cost of £1,502. In September 1931 the track layout in Biggin Street was improved. Further consideration of conversion of the River route to trolleybus operation in the autumn of 1931 came to nothing. Further track renewal at Dover Priory station was done in January 1933. In September 1933, tram No.22 was scrapped as the bodywork was in poor condition. It was considered that two other trams were nearing the end of their useful lives. Two second-hand trams and two tram bodies were purchased from Birmingham Corporation at a cost of £310. The bodies were mounted on the trucks of two scrapped trams, and the four new trams took numbers 19 – 22 in the fleet.

=== Abandonment ===
In April 1934, discussion of the transport policy in Dover resulted in the decision by the Tramways Committee to run tram services until 31 March 1936 and to promote a bill for the introduction of corporation bus services within the borough. The East Kent Road Car Company had offered to assist with the provision of bus services in the borough. The council referred the decision back to the committee asking for details of East Kent's terms. In October 1934, the council asked for expert opinion from the general manager of Birmingham Corporation Tramways and Omnibus Department, Arthur Chantrey Baker. Three options were to be considered; reconditioning the tramways, the offer from East Kent, and provision of bus services by the corporation. The result was that East Kent was to provide buses within the borough, with the corporation receiving 75% of the profits after certain allowable expenses were deducted. The corporation was free of any liability in the event of a loss being incurred by East Kent. The final trams ran on 31 December 1936, nine months later than was originally planned. The open-top trams were scrapped at River by burning them. The covered trams were disposed of by contract. It is believed that they too were scrapped in this way.

== Accidents ==
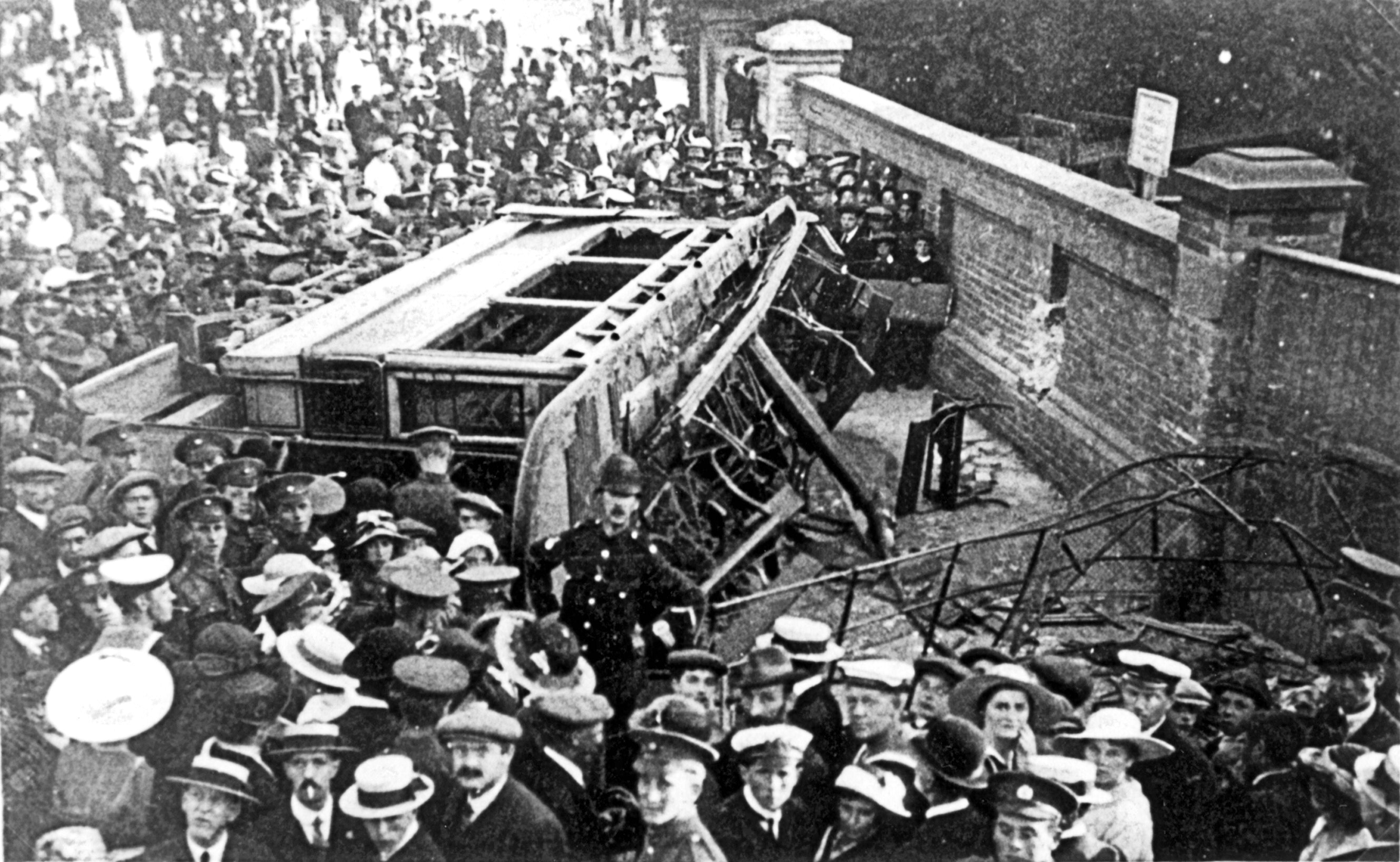
The Crabble tram accident of 19 August 1917 was one of the worst on record with 11 dead and 60 injured, many seriously, according to the coroner's report

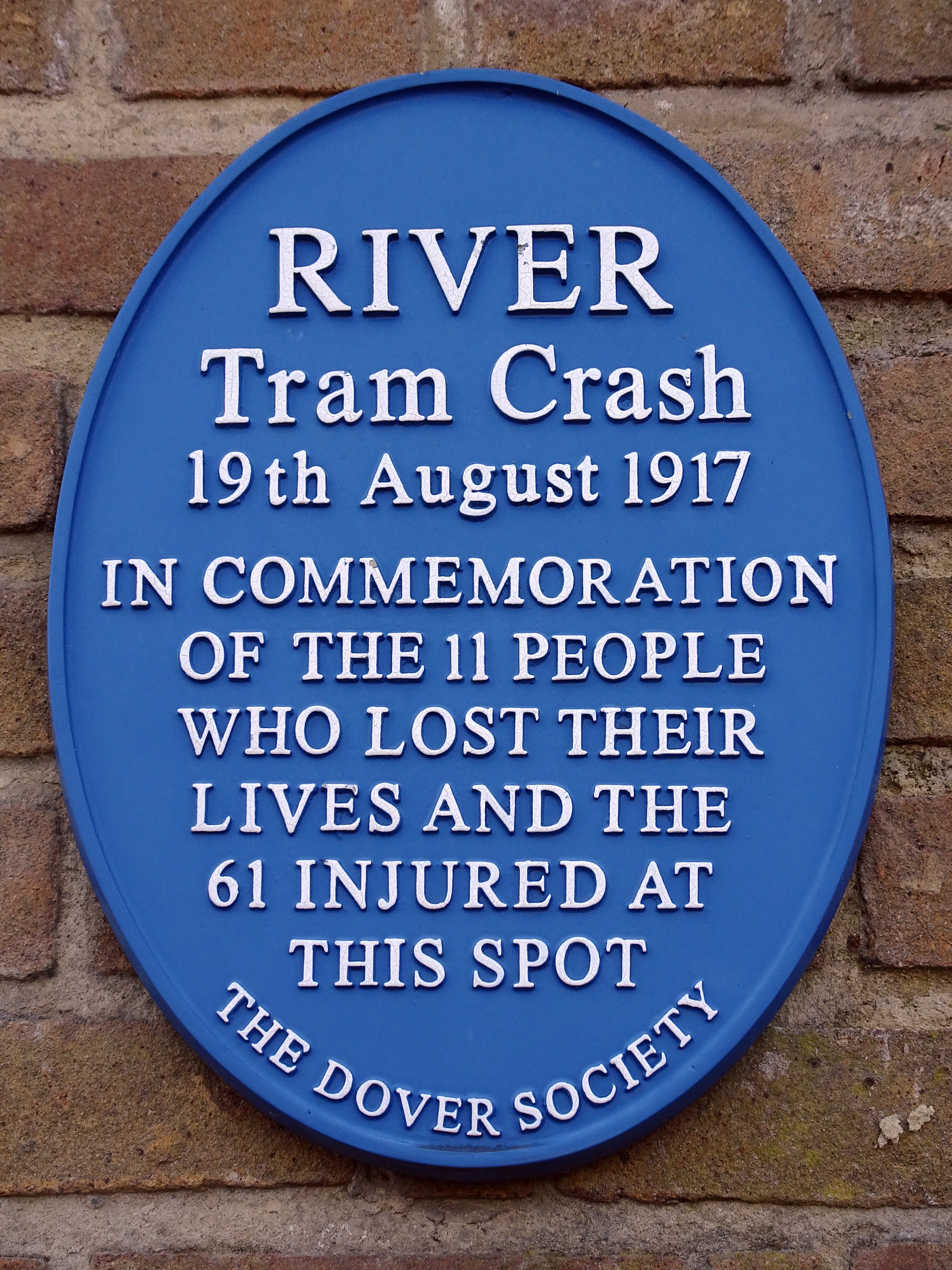

On 19 August 1917, tram No.20 ran away down Crabble Hill and overturned, killing eleven passengers and injuring sixty. A Board of Trade enquiry was held on 24 August 1917 by Colonel Pringle, R.E. The main cause of the accident was driver error due to inexperience; the tramway was suffering a shortage of experienced drivers due to the First World War, and the driver in charge had only been working as a tram driver for five weeks before the accident. The tram was also seriously overloaded, carrying 70 passengers when there was seating for only 48. The driver had not turned the power off to the motors and stopped at the top of the hill as required, the track brakes were not sufficient to slow the heavily loaded tram, and he was unable to operate the rheostatic emergency brakes, as these only worked when the motors were unpowered. The tram ran out of control down the hill, and overturned on a bend, and the top deck was smashed against a brick wall. The Coroner recorded a verdict of misadventure on all the dead. It was discovered that the Corporation was under insured, and some of the compensation payable to the victims of the accident had to come out of the general rates. Despite severe damage to the tram, it was eventually repaired and returned to service. It was the worst ever tram accident in the United Kingdom.

On 21 September 1923, tram No.23 ran away down Crabble Hill and derailed at the bottom, colliding head-on with tram No.24. Although both cars had many windows broken there were no serious injuries. The causes of the accident were a defective handbrake on tram 23, low adhesion of the track due to wet leaves, and the driver's mishandling of the controls of the tram, which he was driving from the rear when the accident happened.

== Depots ==
=== Buckland ===
Buckland Depot, at grid reference TR 30635 42795, had four tracks, each capable of holding five trams. The two centre tracks had inspection pits, but the depot was not suitable for maintenance and repairs, this work having to be done at the Maxton Depot. Although consideration was given to providing maintenance facilities at Buckland in 1919, the council was unable to negotiate the purchase of the necessary land to expand the depot. Buckland depot still stands, and is used as a car sales showroom.

=== Maxton ===
Maxton Depot, at grid reference TR 30392 40848, had two tracks, each capable of holding three trams. The left hand track had an inspection pit. All maintenance and repairs were done at this depot.

== Tramcars ==
=== New cars ===
Number	Supplier	Body	Trucks	Built	Notes
1	Dick, Kerr & Company	Brush	Peckham	1897	Cannibalised by 1918.
2	Dick, Kerr & Company	Brush	Peckham	1897	Scrapped 1925, body converted to waiting room at South Road, River.
3	Dick, Kerr & Company	Brush	Peckham	1897	Performed opening ceremony. Scrapped 1927.
4	Dick, Kerr & Company	Brush	Peckham	1897	Scrapped 1927.
5	Dick, Kerr & Company	Brush	Peckham	1897	Scrapped 1927.
6	Dick, Kerr & Company	Brush	Peckham	1897	Scrapped 1927.
7	Dick, Kerr & Company	Brush	Peckham	1897	Scrapped 1927.
8	Dick, Kerr & Company	Brush	Peckham	1897	Body used as waiting room at Buckland.
9	Dick, Kerr & Company	Brush	Peckham	1897	Body used as waiting room at Maxton.
10	Dick, Kerr & Company	Brush	Peckham	1897	Scrapped 1927.
11	Milnes		Peckham	1898	Scrapped 1927.
12	Milnes		Peckham	1898	Scrapped 1927.
13	Milnes		Peckham	1898	Rebuilt 1926, withdrawn 1930.
14	Milnes		Peckham	1898	Scrapped 1927.
15	JG Brill Company		Brill	1899	Reconditioned 1927, withdrawn 1930.
16	JG Brill Company		Brill	1899	Reconditioned 1927, withdrawn 1930.
17	Dick, Kerr & Company		Brill	1902	Built with reversed stairs. Rebuilt 1918, withdrawn 1923, body sold 1930.
18	Dick, Kerr & Company		Brill	1905	Withdrawn 1923
19	Dick, Kerr & Company		Brill	1905	Scrapped 1933, truck retained and reused.
20	Dick, Kerr & Company		Brill	1905	Severely damaged in accident 1917 but later rebuilt. Scrapped 1926.
21	Dick, Kerr & Company		Brill	1905	Scrapped 1933, truck retained and reused.
22	Brush		Brill	1912	Scrapped 1933
23	Brush		Brill	1912	Accident September 1923, repaired and returned to service.
24	Brush		Brill	1912	Accident September 1923, repaired and returned to service.
25	English Electric		Preston	1920	Fitted with top cover in 1929.
26	English Electric		Preston	1920	Fitted with top cover in 1929.
27	English Electric		Preston	1920	Fitted with top cover in 1929.

=== Second-hand cars ===
Number	Supplier	Body	Trucks	Built	Notes
1	English Electric		Preston		Ex West Hartlepool, acquired 1927.
2	English Electric		Preston		Ex West Hartlepool, acquired 1927.
3	English Electric		Preston		Ex West Hartlepool, acquired 1927.
4	English Electric		Preston		Ex West Hartlepool, acquired 1927.
5	English Electric		Preston		Ex West Hartlepool, acquired 1927.
6					Ex Birmingham & Midland Joint Committee, Tividale. Acquired 1930.
7					Ex Birmingham & Midland, acquired 1930.
8	English Electric		Preston		Ex Darlington Corporation Light Railways, acquired 1926.
9	English Electric		Preston		Ex Darlington Corporation Light Railways, acquired 1926.
10					Ex Birmingham & Midland, acquired 1930. Was the "last tram".
11					Ex Birmingham & Midland, acquired 1928.
12					Ex Birmingham & Midland, acquired 1928.
14					Ex Birmingham & Midland, acquired 1930.
17					Ex Birmingham & Midland, acquired 1930.
19					Ex Birmingham & Midland, acquired 1933.
20					Ex Birmingham & Midland, acquired 1933.
21					Ex Birmingham & Midland, acquired 1933.
22					Converted to open top tram. Ex Birmingham & Midland, acquired 1933.
