= Dundee and District Tramways =

Scottish tramway

Dundee and District Tramways Company
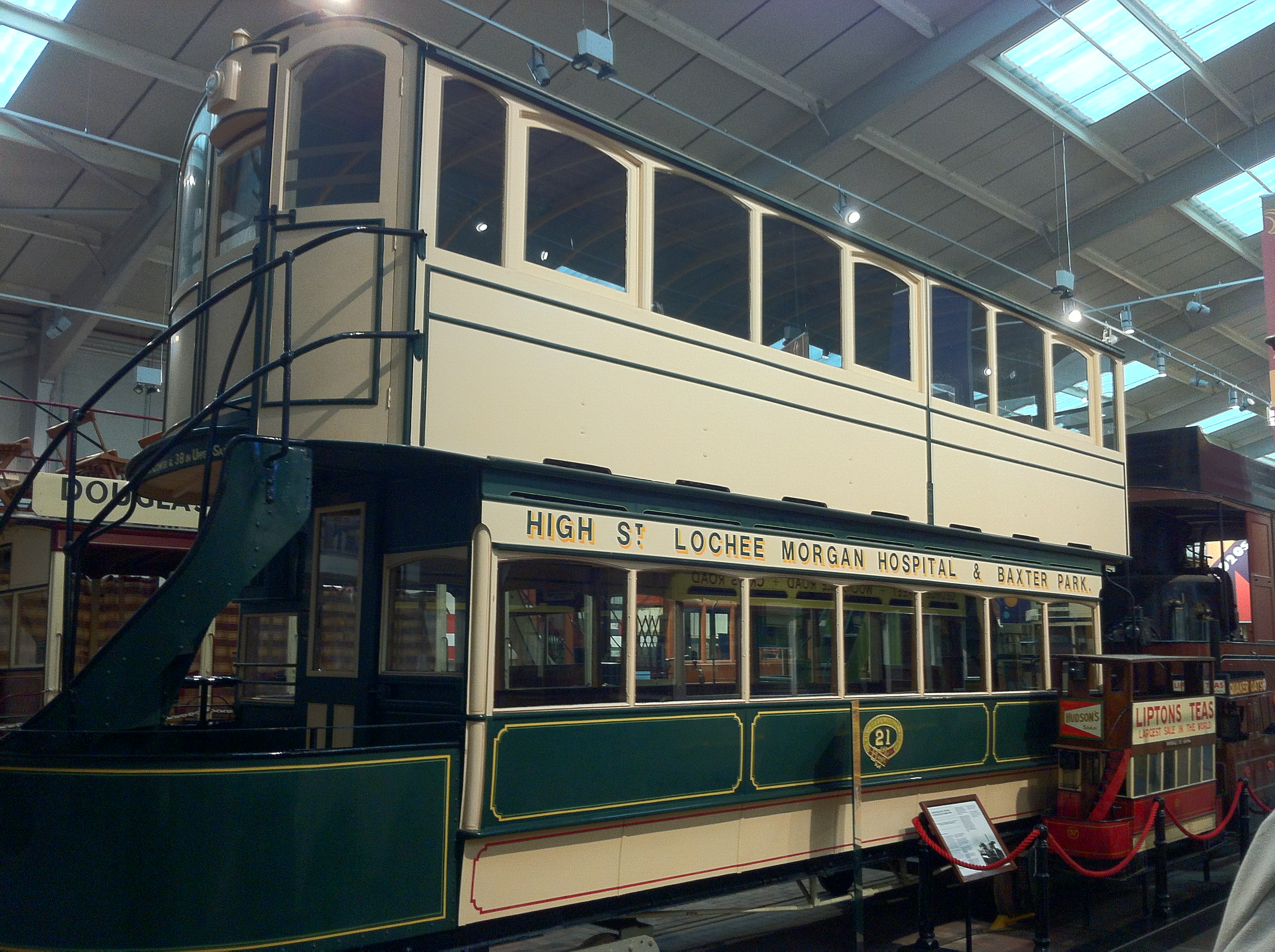
- Tramcar 21 preserved at the National Tramway Museum

Operation
- Locale: Dundee, Scotland
- Open: 1877
- Close: 1899
- Status: Closed

Infrastructure
- Track gauge: 1,435 mm (4 ft 8 1/2 in)
- Propulsion systems: Horse and Steam
- Depots: South Road, Dundee

Dundee and District Tramways operated a tramway service in Dundee between 1877 and 1899.

== History ==
The idea for a public tramway network in Dundee was pioneered by the Dundee Tramway and Omnibus Company, and was authorised by the Dundee Tramways Act 1872 (35 & 36 Vict. c. cxci). However, they did not build the tramway themselves; instead it was built by the police commissioners, who then leased it to the Dundee and District Tramways Company, which had been set up in August 1877 to operate the system. It was built to the standard gauge of 4 ft 8 1/2 in (1,435 mm) and designed for horse-drawn trams. Probably because the act specified that the system had to be built in five years, and the deadline was rapidly approaching in 1877, the company hired two tramcars from Edinburgh Street Tramways and three from Glasgow Tramway and Omnibus Company in order to allow the service to begin on 30 August 1877. The tramway was 1.25 miles (2.01 km) long, and was the first part of a larger system authorised by the act of Parliament. The trams were all open-topped, double deck vehicles, and were numbered 1A to 5A. Two trams were then purchased from Glasgow, which were numbered 6A and 7A, and this allowed the hired vehicles 4A and 5A to be returned. In December 1877, hiring of the Edinburgh cars ceased, as the company received three new tramcars, built by Glasgow Tramway and Omnibus Company, which reused the numbers 3A to 5A.

The tramway began at Windsor Street, and ran along Perth Road, Nethergate, High Street and Reform Street to reach the main post office in Euclid Crescent. This route was double track throughout. Work on extending the system began in 1878, and on 24 December 1879, two additional sections were added. The first was from Perth Road to West Park Road, some 0.5 miles (0.8 km) of single track, while the second was a double track branch, running northwards up Lochee Road to the village of Lochee, where a permanent depot for the tramcars was built. In order to service the extra mileage, five new trams were built by T. Swinton and Sons of Dundee. They were mounted on Eades reversible trucks, allowing the body to be pivoted through 180 degrees when the tram reached a terminus. For reasons that were not recorded, they were numbered with Roman numerals, becoming numbers CI, CVIII, CIX, CX and CXI.

Further expansion took place on 19 June 1880, when routes from the post office to Morgan Hospital and to Baxter Park opened, both running along Victoria Road. This brought the total mileage to 5.66 miles (9.11 km) Again, more trams were needed, and T. Swinton built two new vehicles, which were slightly smaller than the original batch, and were numbered CXII and CXIII. A third new car was added in 1882, which carried the number 2, built by G. F. Milnes & Co. of Birkenhead. Finally, in 1883, two single deck cars with open tops were bought for summer workings, and were numbered 14 and 15.

In 1880 the company had experimented with a Dickinson steam powered combined car, but in 1884 they purchased two steam tram locomotives from Thomas Green & Son of Leeds, and a second-hand bogie car, probably from Lancaster Corporation Tramways. Two more locomotives were obtained in 1885, and public services began using steam power on 20 June 1885. As there was only one trailer car made for the job, the locomotives regularly pulled pairs of horse cars. From 8 July 1886, steam trams worked on the whole of the network, using six locomotives, while by 1894, the number of tram locomotives had risen to 13. Trailer cars were bought from several different manufacturers, while some were built from pairs of redundant horse trams, with the company eventually owning 11 such vehicles. Two short single track additions to the network opened in 1894, one running from Victoria Street to Fairmuir via Hilltown, and the other running along Morgan Street to link the routes to Morgan Hospital and Baxter Park. At the same time, two new horse trams were purchased. The steam tram locomotives were of two types. The first few used a design patented by Wilkinson and Company of Wigan, and were built under licence. The boiler was mounted vertically, as were the cylinders. Later on, the locomotives were built to Green's own design, with a more conventional horizontal boiler and inclined cylinders.

When the company first started running trams, they carried a polished mahogany livery. This was replaced by dark red and yellow paintwork in 1879, and then by dark green and cream from 1894. In 1893, the lease of the tramway ran out, and was renewed by Dundee Corporation for another 14 years, allowing the company to run the existing system and the extensions made the following year. However, the corporation decided in 1897 that it would like to run the tramways itself, and so negotiations began to terminate the lease early. The tramcars, buildings and plant were valued, and were bought by the corporation on 1 June 1899. In addition, Dundee paid compensation of £2,100 per year to the company from that date until the original end of lease in May 1907. The Dundee and District Tramways Company still had a number of bus services, which they continued to run until they became bankrupt in 1922, but ownership and operation of the tramway was the responsibility of the Corporation. Once the changeover to electric traction was completed in 1902, the steam trams were disposed of. Several of the trailer cars were sold at an auction, which took place at Lochee depot on 24 July 1902. Dundee Corporation Tramways retained two of the tram locomotives, which were used as snow ploughs until 1934.

Unusually, the tram lines were publicly built and owned, although initially leased by police commissioners to a private company.

The depot of 1879 was located on South Road, and was designed by the Scottish architect, James Maclaren.

== Preservation ==
Steam tram trailer car 21 survived and is now housed at the National Tramway Museum at Crich in Derbyshire. It was supplied in 1894 by the Birkenhead-based company of G F Milnes. It was built with a straight steel underframe and bogies at each end, resulting in a relatively high floor level, which was accessed by corner steps. The downstairs saloon had seven bays with open balconies at the front and rear, while the upstairs deck was fully enclosed, to protect passengers from soot and smoke from the locomotives, and was slightly longer than the lower deck. The vehicle had seats for 66 passengers, 28 on the lower deck and 38 on the upper deck. It was one of the cars sold at auction in 1902, and the lower deck was mounted on a concrete plinth and used as a shelter for fishermen at Crombie Reservoir in Angus for over 60 years. In 1963, its origins were recognised by enthusiasts, and it was rescued. Much of the restoration work, funded by the Tramcar Sponsorship Organisation and the Tramway Museum Society, took place at Marton Moss near Blackpool. The body now sits on two bogies dating from 1896, and used on the Upper Douglas Cable Tramway. The upper deck and staircases had to be made from scratch, as nothing of them was left. The restoration was completed in 1989, when the vehicle was put on public display at Crich, but it has never been used in service there, as it is not currently fitted with a braking mechanism.

The lower deck of a second vehicle, horse tram number 24, was used as a summerhouse in a garden in Perth. This was identified by transport expert Alan Brotchie in 1971, and in 2014 the owners generously donated the remains of the vehicle to the Dundee Museum of Transport. The tramcar was removed from the garden on 18 January 2014, for restoration to begin. Removal was difficult, because it was hemmed in by houses and an orchard, but volunteers, aided by the heavy lifting company Nixon Hire of Dundee, succeeded in moving the two-ton tramcar, which still had all of its original interior, onto a low loader for transport to the museum site.

Parts of a third vehicle, which was also a horse tram, is parked over a short section of rail in Commercial Street, where it forms part of the Bridgeview Station restaurant. It is known as the Auld Tram, and serves coffee and sandwiches. It was installed on Commercial Street in late 2013, and is painted in the later green and cream livery. It was another car built by G F Milnes, which carried the number 2 and was reused after the system closed. It was then rescued and moved to Birkenhead, but while it was in storage, it was damaged in a fire. The Merseyside Tramway Preservation Society restored the lower saloon cosmetically, and it was displayed outside the Woodside Ferry Terminal for some years, before being moved to the Wirral Transport Museum site on Taylor Street. The Bridgeview Station restaurant had previously tried to buy the vehicle, and as the transport museum was restricted for space, they reconsidered the offer, and the tramcar moved to Dundee. Once planning permission was obtained, which was a lengthy process, the tram was moved to Nottingham, where £45,000 was spent on restoration and conversion to enable it to fulfil its new role. Although there are tram tracks below the car, it does not have any wheels.

== Bibliography ==
- Greig, Gavin (19 January 2014). "Dundee Tram". ggreig.livejournal.com. Archived from the original on 20 December 2015.
- Klapper, Charles (1974). The Golden Age of Tramways. David & Charles. ISBN 978-0-7153-6458-1.
- Swinfen, Christopher A; Smith, D B; Whatley, Annette M (1995). The Life and Times of Dundee. J Donald Publishers. ISBN 978-0-85976-388-2.
- Turner, Keith (1996). The Directory of British Tramways. Patrick Stephens. ISBN 978-1-85260-549-0.
- Waddington, Andrew (4 September 2014). "Lost Trams 12: Dundee 2". British Trams online. Archived from the original on 22 June 2019.
