= Dundee, Broughty Ferry and District Tramways =

Defunct tramway system in Dundee, Scotland

Dundee, Broughty Ferry and District Tramways Company
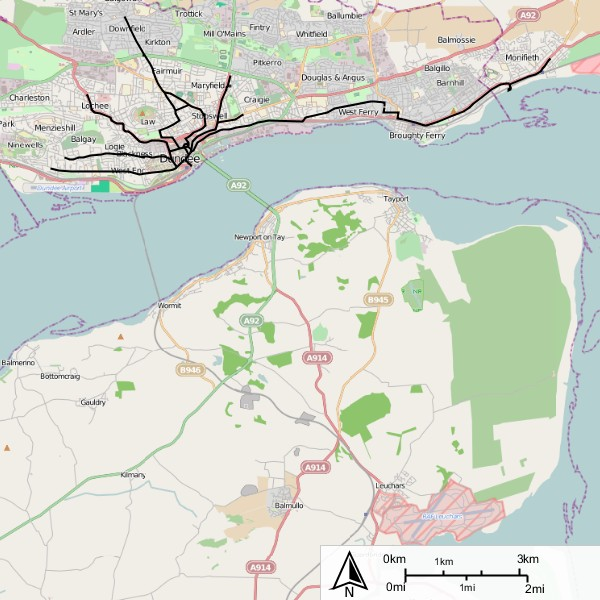
- Map of the routes of tramways in the Dundee area

Operation
- Locale: Dundee, Broughty Ferry, Monifieth
- Open: 27 December 1905
- Close: 16 May 1931
- Status: Closed

Infrastructure
- Track gauge: 1,435 mm (4 ft 8 1/2 in)
- Propulsion system: Electric
- Depot: Ferry Road

Statistics
- Route length: 5.1 miles (8.2 km)

The Dundee, Broughty Ferry and District Tramways operated a tramway service between Dundee, Broughty Ferry and Monifieth between 1905 and 1931.

== History ==
There had been several attempts to promote a tramway along the north shore of the Firth of Tay prior to George Balfour obtaining the Dundee, Broughty Ferry and District Tramways Order Confirmation Act 1904 (4 Edw. 7. c. clxx). Balfour was a politician and director of a number of tramway and electric supply companies in England, Wales and Scotland. With Andrew Beatty, he went on to establish the engineering consultancy Balfour Beatty in 1909. The 1904 act gave the tramway company the authority to construct five tramways, each a continuation of the previous one, to create a continuous line from Panmure Street in Monifieth to Craigie Terrace on Broughty Ferry Road in Dundee, where it made an end-on junction with the Dundee Corporation Tramways tracks. It was to be predominantly double-track, although there were some single-track sections, and while much of it was laid along public roads, some of it was to be built on private land. The tramway company was registered in 1905.

The line was laid quickly, as most of it ran through open countryside. It was around 4 miles (6.4 km) long, and closely followed the route of the Dundee and Arbroath Joint Railway tracks. Services started on 27 December 1905. The depot and power station was built in Milton on Ferry Road, around 1 mile (1.6 km) from the Monifieth terminus. Coal for the power station was delivered by railway. The power station comprised three Lancashire boilers and two Bellis-Bruce Peebles 200 kW generators. Cooling water was obtained from Dichty Water, while water for the boilers was obtained from Dundee's water mains.

For the initial services in 1905, twelve double-deck open-topped tramcars were bought from Brush Electrical Engineering of Loughborough. Two more were bought in 1907, again from Brush, which had a roof over the upper deck, and two vehicles built by Electric Railway & Tramway Carriage Works of Preston, Lancashire were obtained secondhand from Dundee Corporation in 1914. The head office was at 4 High Street, Dundee. Two extensions to the system were made during its lifetime. The first was in 1908, when the terminus in Monifieth was moved 300 yards (270 m) further to the east, from near Union Street to near Tay Street. The second was in 1914, when they bought 1 mile (1.6 km) of track and overhead wiring from Dundee Corporation, extending their ownership from Craigie Terrace to the burgh boundary at Belsize Road. Both companies already ran their vehicles onto each other's tracks under a joint running agreement. The two extra trams which they also bought had been built in 1900, and were in poor condition.

== Closure ==
In 1931 the company was purchased by Dundee Corporation and most of the tramway was closed on 16 May 1931. One mile of its former route continued to be operated by Dundee Corporation Tramways.

== Bibliography ==
- Klapper, Charles (1974). The Golden Age of Tramways. David & Charles. ISBN 978-0-7153-6458-1.
- Turner, Keith (1996). The Directory of British Tramways. Patrick Stephens. ISBN 978-1-85260-549-0.
