= Trolleybuses in Darlington =

Town trolleybus system, Darlington, England

Darlington trolleybus system
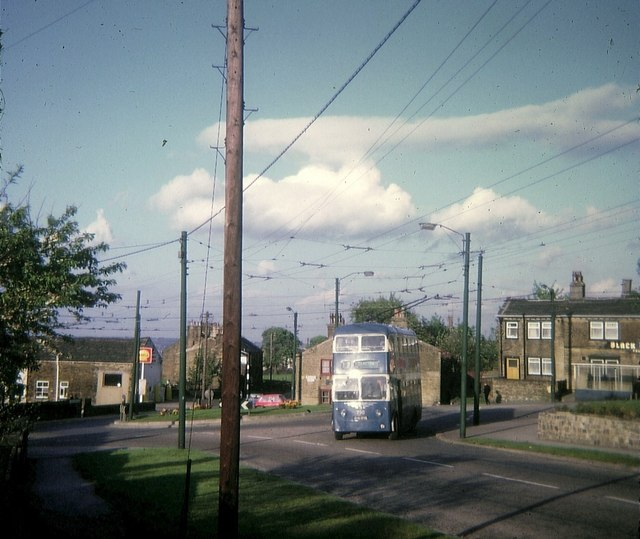
- A rebodied former Darlington trolleybus working on the Bradford system, May 1970

Operation
- Locale: Darlington, County Durham, England
- Open: 17 January 1926
- Close: 31 July 1957
- Status: Closed
- Routes: 5
- Operator: Darlington Corporation Transport

Infrastructure
- Stock: 66 (maximum)

The Darlington trolleybus system once served the town of Darlington, County Durham, England. Opened on 17 January 1926, it replaced the Darlington Corporation Light Railways tramway network.

By the standards of the various now-defunct trolleybus systems in the United Kingdom, the Darlington system was a moderately sized one, with a total of five routes, and a maximum fleet of 66 trolleybuses. It was closed relatively early, on 31 July 1957.

None of the former Darlington trolleybuses are recorded as having been preserved.

== See also ==
- Transport in Darlington
- List of trolleybus systems in the United Kingdom
