= Light Railways Act 1896 =

Act of the Parliament of the United Kingdom

Light Railways Act 1896 (Note: Section 29.)
- Act of Parliament
- Parliament of the United Kingdom
- Long title: An Act to facilitate the Construction of Light Railways in Great Britain.
- Citation: 59 & 60 Vict. c. 48
- Territorial extent: England and Wales; Scotland (Note: Section 27.)

Dates
- Royal assent: 14 August 1896
- Commencement: 14 August 1896 (Note: The Acts of Parliament (Commencement) Act 1793)
- Repealed: England and Wales: 1 January 1993 (Note: The Transport and Works Act 1992 (Commencement No. 3 and Transitional Provisions) Order 1992 (SI 1992/2784).)
Other legislation
Amended by	Statute Law Revision Act 1908; Light Railways Act 1912; Ministry of Health Act 1919; Railways Act 1921; Finance Act 1929; Local Government Act 1933; Local Government (Scotland) Act 1947; Arbitration Act 1950; Crown Estate Act 1956; Statute Law Revision Act 1959; Statute Law Revision Act 1960; Crown Estate Act 1961; Transport Act 1962; Administration of Justice Act 1965; Statute Law Revision Act 1966; Local Government Act 1972; Local Government (Scotland) Act 1973; Administration of Justice Act 1982; Roads (Scotland) Act 1984; Statute Law (Repeals) Act 1986; Statute Law (Repeals) Act 1989; Police and Fire Reform (Scotland) Act 2012 (Consequential Provisions and Modifications) Order 2013; Crown Estate Transfer Scheme 2017
Repealed by	England and Wales: Transport and Works Act 1992

Status: Partially repealed

Status
- England and Wales: Repealed
- Scotland: Amended

Text of statute as originally enacted

Revised text of statute as amended

Text of the Light Railways Act 1896 as in force today (including any amendments) within the United Kingdom, from legislation.gov.uk.

The Light Railways Act 1896 (59 & 60 Vict. c. 48) is an act of the Parliament of the United Kingdom.

== History ==
Before the act each new railway line built in the country required a specific act of Parliament to be obtained by the company that wished to construct it, which greatly added to the cost and time it took to construct new railways. The economic downturn of the 1880s had hit agriculture and rural communities in the United Kingdom especially hard and the government wished to facilitate the construction of railways in rural areas, especially to facilitate the transport of goods. The 1896 act defined a class of railways which did not require specific legislation to construct – companies could simply plan a line under the auspices of the new act, and, having obtained a light railway order, build and operate it. By reducing the legal costs and allowing new railways to be built quickly the government hoped to encourage companies to build the new 'light railways' in areas of low population and industry that were previously of little interest to them.

A light railway is not a tramway but a separate class of railway. The act was triggered by the complexity of creating the low-cost railways that were needed at the time in rural areas, and by the successful use of tramway rules to create the Wisbech and Upwell Tramway in 1882, which was in fact a light railway in all but name.

The Regulation of Railways Act 1868 (31 & 32 Vict. c. 119) had permitted the construction of light railways subject to '...such conditions and regulations as the Board of Trade may from time to time impose or make'; for such railways it specified a maximum permitted axle weight and stated that '...the regulations respecting the speed of trains shall not authorize a speed exceeding at any time twenty-five miles an hour'.

For the purpose of facilitating the construction and working of light railways in Great Britain, there shall be established a commission, consisting of three commissioners, to be styled the Light Railway Commissioners, and to be appointed by the President of the Board of Trade.

The Light Railways Act 1896 did not specify any exceptions or limitations that should apply to light railways; it did not even attempt to define a 'light railway'. However, it gave powers to a panel of three Light Railway Commissioners to include 'provisions for the safety of the public... as they think necessary for the proper construction and working of the railway' in any light railway order (LRO) granted under the act. These could limit vehicle axle weights and speeds: the maximum speed of 25 miles per hour (mph) often associated with the Light Railways Act 1896 is not specified in the act but was a product of the earlier Regulation of Railways Act 1868 (31 & 32 Vict. c. 119). However, limits were particularly needed when lightly laid track and relatively modest bridges were used in order to keep costs down. LROs could also exempt light railways from some of the requirements of a normal railway: level crossings did not have to be protected by gates, but only by cattle grids, saving the cost of both the gates and a keeper to operate them. It did not exclude standard-gauge track, but narrow-gauge tracks were used for many railways built under its provisions. Many of the railways built under the auspices of the act were very basic, with little or no signalling (many ran under the 'one engine in steam' principle).

A number of municipal and company-owned street tramways were built or extended by the act, in preference to the Tramways Act 1870 (33 & 34 Vict. c. 78). The procedure of the 1896 act was simpler, permission easier to obtain (local authorities had the right to veto lines under the 1870 legislation), and there was a 75% savings on rates payable as compared to a tramway.

The act was never a great success. By the 1920s the use of road transport had killed the majority of these little railways, although some survived thanks to clever management and tight financial control.

The act remains in force in Scotland. No new light railway orders were allowed to be issued for Scotland since 2007, with the last order granted in 2012.

Until the Transport and Works Act 1992 introduced transport works orders, heritage railways in the UK were operated under light railway orders.

== Railways built under the act ==
=== Light railway orders ===
==== 1897-1899 ====
===== 1897 =====
- Basingstoke and Alton Light Railway Order 1897 (C. 8749)
- East and West Yorkshire Union Light Railway Order 1897 (C. 8750)
- Flamborough and Bridlington Light Railways Order 1897 (C. 8807)
- Gower Light Railway Order 1897 (C. 9103)
- Hadlow Light Railway Order 1897 (C. 8751)
- Potteries Light Railways Order 1897 (C. 8748)
- West Hartlepool Light Railways Order 1897 (C. 9063)
- Wrington Vale Light Railway Order 1897 (C. 8803)

===== 1898 =====
- Amesbury and Military Camp Light Railway Order 1898 (C. 9105)
- Bankfoot Light Railway Order 1898 (C. 9147)
- Barking and Beckton Light Railways Order 1898 (C. 9211)
- Bridlington and North Frodingham Light Railway Order 1898 (C. 8954)
- Caledonian Railway (Leadhills and Wanlockhead) Light Railway Order 1898 (C. 9064)
- Carmyllie Light Railway Order 1898 (C. 9065)
- Crowland and District Light Railways Order 1898 (C. 8844)
- Didcot and Watlington Light Railway Order 1898 (C. 9212)
- Dornoch Light Railway Order 1898 (C. 9066)
- Dudley and District Light Railways Order 1898 (C. 9104)
- Flamborough and Bridlington Light Railways (Amendment) Order 1898 (C. 9143)
- Forsinard, Melvich, and Port Skerra Light Railway Order 1898 (C. 8955)
- Gifford and Garvald Light Railway Order 1898 (C. 8956)
- Goole and Marshland Light Railway Order 1898 (C. 9067)
- Great Western Railway (Pewsey and Salisbury) Light Railway Order 1898 (C. 9071)
- Grimsby and Saltfleetby Light Railway Order 1898 (C. 9213)
- Isle of Axholme Light Railways Order 1898 (C. 9214)
- Isle of Thanet Light Railways Order 1898 (C. 9027)
- Kinver Light Railway Order 1898 (C. 9215)
- Lauder Light Railway Order 1898 (C. 8933)
- Leek, Caldon Low, and Hartington Light Railways Order 1898 (C. 9216)
- Liverpool and Prescot Light Railway Order 1898 (C. 9217)
- Lizard Light Railway Order 1898 (C. 8843)
- Llandudno and Colwyn Bay Light Railway Order 1898 (C. 9395)
- London United Tramways, Limited (Light Railway Extensions) Order 1898 (C. 9326)
- Middleton Light Railways Order 1898 (C. 9146)
- North Holderness Light Railway Order 1898 (C. 9102)
- North Shields, Tynemouth, and District Light Railways Order 1898 (C. 9218)
- North Sunderland Light Railway Order 1898 (C. 9070)
- Pewsey and Salisbury (Devizes Branch) Light Railway Order 1898 (C. 9068)
- Portsdown and Horndean Light Railway Order 1898 (C. 9540)
- St. George and Hanham Light Railway Order 1898 (C. 9145)
- Sheppey Light Railway Order 1898 (C. 9324)
- South Norfolk Light Railway Order 1898 (C. 9219)
- Tanat Valley Light Railway Order 1898 (C. 9144)
- Vale of Rheidol Light Railway (Aberayron Extension) Order 1898 (C. 9069)
- Ventnor Inclined Light Railway Order 1898 (C. 9220)
- West Highland Railway (Loch Fyne Light Railway) Order 1898 (C. 8957)

===== 1899 =====
- Axminster and Lyme Regis Light Railway Order 1899 (C. 9394)
- Bradford and Leeds Light Railway Order 1899 (Cd. 58)
- Chatham and District Light Railways Order 1899 (C. 9544)
- Coggeshall Light Railway Order 1899 (Cd. 55)
- Corringham Light Railway Order 1899 (C. 9392)
- Cranbrook and Tenterden Light Railway Order 1899 (Cd. 62)
- Didcot and Watlington Light Railway Extensions Order 1899 (C. 9535)
- Doncaster Corporation Light Railways Order 1899 (Cd. 59)
- Fraserburgh and St. Combs Light Railway Order 1899 (C. 9538)
- Glasgow and South-western Railway (Maidens and Dunure Light Railway) Order 1899 (C. 9545)
- Glasgow and South-Western (Cairn Valley Light Railway) Order 1899 (Cd. 64)
- Merthyr Tydfil Light Railway Order 1899 (C. 9325)
- Penzance, Newlyn, and West Cornwall Light Railway Order 1999 (C. 9542)
- Poole and District Light Railway Order 1899 (C. 9543)
- Southend-on-Sea and District Light Railways Order 1899 (C. 9537)
- Trent Valley Light Railway Order 1899 (C. 9541)
- Welshpool and Llanfair Light Railway Order 1899 (C. 9536)
- West Manchester Light Railways Order 1899 (C. 9393)
- Wick and Lybster Light Railway Order 1899 (Cd. 63)

==== 1900-1909 ====
===== 1900 =====
- Barnsley and District Light Railway Order 1900 (Cd. 390)
- Basingstoke and Alton Light Railway (Amendment) Order 1900 (Cd. 65)
- Bere Alston and Calstock Light Railway Order 1900 (Cd. 272)
- Bexhill and St. Leonards Light Railway Order 1900 (Cd. 233)
- Bromsgrove Light Railways Order 1900 (Cd. 394)
- Callington Light Railway Order 1900 (Cd. 192)
- Cheltenham and District Light Railway Order 1900 (Cd. 236)
- Cheltenham and District Light Railway (Extension) Order 1900 (Cd. 234)
- Dudley and District Light Railways (Extensions) Order 1900 (Cd. 194)
- Essington and Ashmore Light Railway Order 1900 (Cd. 61)
- Gateshead and District Light Railway Order 1900 (Cd. 392)
- Highbridge, Wedmore, and Cheddar Light Railway Order 1900 (Cd. 242)
- Isle of Thanet Light Railways (Extensions) Order 1900 (Cd. 105)
- Lastingham and Rosedale Light Railway Order 1900 (Cd. 388)
- Mid-Suffolk Light Railway Order 1900 (Cd. 191)
- North Lindsey Light Railways Order 1900 (Cd. 56)
- North Lincolnshire Light Railway Order 1900 (Cd. 57)
- North Wales Narrow Gauge Railways (Beddgelert Light Railway Extension) Order 1900 (Cd. 389)
- Peterborough and District Light Railways Order 1900 (Cd. 395)
- Redditch and District Light Railways Order 1900 (Cd. 60)
- Rhyl and Prestatyn Light Railway Order 1900 (Cd. 193)
- Robertsbridge and Pevensey Light Railway Order 1900 (Cd. 235)
- South Staffordshire Light Railway Order 1900 (Cd. 391)
- South Staffordshire Light Railway (Extensions) Order 1900 (Cd. 393)

===== 1901 =====
- Bardfield and Sible Hedingham Light Railway Order 1901
- Barrowford Light Railway Order 1901
- Bath and District Light Railways Order 1901
- Blackburn, Whalley, and Padiham Light Railways Order 1901
- Blackpool and Garstang Light Railway Order 1901
- Central Essex Light Railway Order 1901
- Brackenhill Light Railway Order 1901
- Cleobury Mortimer and Ditton Priors Light Railway Order 1901
- Colne and Trawden Light Railways Order 1901 (Cd. 738)
- County of Middlesex Light Railways Order 1901
- East Sussex Light Railway Order 1901
- Halesowen Light Railways Order 1901
- Jarrow and South Shields Light Railways Order 1901
- Kelvedon, Tiptree, and Tollesbury Light Railway Order 1901
- Maidstone and Faversham Junction Light Railway Order 1901
- Mansfield and District Light Railways Order 1901 (Cd. 651)
- Nelson Light Railway Order 1901
- Ormskirk and Southport Light Railways Order 1901
- Spen Valley Light Railway Order 1901
- Spen Valley Light Railway (Extensions) Order 1901
- Tickhill Light Railway Order 1901
- Welshpool and Llanfair Light Railway (Amendment) Order 1901
- Worcester and District Light Railways Order 1901

===== 1902 =====
- Barnsley and District Light Railway (Extension) Order 1902 (Cd. 1245)
- Bentley and Bordon Light Railway Order 1902
- Colne and Trawden Light Railways (Capital and Further Powers Amendment) Order 1902 (Cd. 1247)
- Cromarty and Dingwall Light Railway Order 1902
- Crowland and District Light Railways (Amendment) Order 1902
- Darlington Light Railways Order 1902 (Cd. 1249)
- Dartford Light Railway Order 1902 (Cd. 1017)
- Derwent Valley Light Railway Order 1902 (Cd. 1246)
- Doncaster Corporation Light Railways (Deviation &c.) Order 1902
- Essington and Ashmore Light Railway (Amendment and Extension) Order 1902
- Grimsby and Saltfleetby Light Railway (Amendment) Order 1902 (Cd. 1137)
- Halesowen Light Railways (Extensions) Order 1902
- Holmfield and South Owram Light Railway Order 1902 (Cd. 1195)
- Llanelly and District Light Railway Order 1902 (Cd. 1248)
- Middleton Light Railways (Deviation, &c.) Order 1902
- Orpington, Cudham, and Tatsfield Light Railway Order 1902
- Rother Valley (Light) Railway Order 1902
- Worcester (Extension) Light Railways Order 1902

===== 1903 =====
- Avonmouth Light Railway Order 1903 (Cd. 1866)
- Bankfoot Light Railway (Extension of Time) Order 1903 (Cd. 1859)
- Bath Electric Tramways (Light Railways Extensions) Order 1903
- Barrowford Light Railway Order 1901 (Transfer, &c.) Order 1903
- Bere Alston and Calstock Light Railway (Extension of Time) Order 1903
- Burton and Ashby Light Railway Order 1903
- County of Middlesex Light Railways Order 1903
- County of Middlesex Light Railways (Lands) Order 1903
- Dartford District Light Railways Order 1903
- Dartford Light Railway (Extension) Order 1903
- Doncaster Corporation Light Railways (Extensions) Order 1903
- Dover and River Light Railway Order 1903
- Glamorgan County Council (Morriston to Pontardawe) Light Railways Order 1903
- Llandudno and Colwyn Bay Light Railway (Deviation and Amendment) Order 1903
- Lastingham and Rosedale Light Railway (Extension of Time) Order 1903
- Leighton Buzzard and Hitchin Light Railway Order 1903 (Cd. 1574)
- Maidstone Corporation Light Railways Order 1903 (Cd. 1926)
- Poole and District Light Railway (Extension) Order 1903
- Quarry Bank, Brierley Hill, and Rowley Regis Light Railway Order 1903 (Cd. 1928)
- Robertsbridge and Pevensey Light Railway (Extension of Time) Order 1903 (Cd. 1927)
- Totton, Hythe, and Fawley Light Railway Order 1903 (Cd. 1863)
- Walthamstow and District Light Railway Order 1903
- Warrington and Northwich Light Railways Order 1903

===== 1904 =====
- Bradford Corporation (Nidd Valley Transfer) Light Railway Order 1904
- Clacton-on-Sea and St. Osyth Light Railway Order 1904
- Hertford Light Railways (No. 1) Order 1904
- Leicester and District Light Railways Order 1904
- London United Tramways (Light Railway Extensions) Order 1904 (Cd. 2427)
- Southend and Colchester Light Railways Order 1904
- Southend-on-Sea and District Light Railways (Extensions) Order 1904
- Tickhill Light Railway (Extension of Time) Order 1904

===== 1905 =====
- Axholme Joint Railway (Hatfield Moor Extension Light Railway) Order 1905 (Cd. 271))
- Basingstoke and Alton Light Railway (Speed Amendment) Order 1905 (Cd. 2541)
- Bere Alston and Calstock Light Railway (Amendment) Order 1905
- Campbeltown and Machrihanish Light Railway Order 1905 (Cd. 2544)
- Guildford Light Railway Order 1905 (Cd. 2543)
- Holmfield and Southowram Light Railway (Amendment and Extension of Time) Order 1905 (Cd. 2710)
- Portsmouth and Hayling Light Railway Order 1905 (Cd. 2542)

===== 1906 =====
- Barking Light Railways (Lands) Order 1906 (Cd. 3122)
- Bath and Lansdown Light Railways Order 1906 (Cd. 3233)
- Bath Electric Tramways (Light Railways Extension) Order 1906 (Cd. 2709)
- Bere Alston and Calstock Light Railway (Extension of Time, &c.) Order 1906 (Cd. 3229)
- Bideford, Clovelly, and Hartland Light Railways Order 1906 (Cd. 2845)
- Blagdon and Pensford Light Railway Order 1906 (Cd. 2950)
- Blyton and Frodingham Light Railway Order 1906 (Cd. 2951)
- Burton and Ashby Light Railway (Amendment) Order 1906 (Cd. 2949)
- Clayton West and Darton Light Railway Order 1906 (Cd. 3232)
- County of Hertford (Cheshunt) Light Railways Order 1906
- County of Middlesex (Waltham Cross and Enfield) Light Railways Order 1906
- Falkland Light Railway Order 1906 (Cd. 3235)
- Headcorn and Maidstone Junction Light Railway Order 1906 (Cd. 3060)
- Lampeter, Aberayron, and New Quay Light Railway Order 1906 (Cd. 3231)
- Leek, Caldon Low, and Hartigan Light Railways (Borrowing and Further Powers Amendment) Order 1906 (Cd. 3351)
- North Lindsey Light Railways (Extension) Order 1906 (Cd. 3121)
- Portmadoc, Beddgelert, and South Snowdon Railway (Beddgelert Light Railway Extension) Order 1906 (Cd. 3230)
- Ryhope, Seaham, Murton, and South Hetton Light Railways Order 1906 (Cd. 2847)
- Tarporley Light Railway Order 1906 (Cd. 2846)
- Tottenham Walthamstow Light Railway Order 1906 (Cd. 3236)
- West Manchester Light Railways (New Lines, &c.) Order 1906 (Cd. 3058)
- Woking and Bagshot Light Railways Order 1906 (Cd. 3059)

===== 1907 =====
- Barton and Immingham Light Railway Order 1907
- Derwent Valley Light Railway (Transfer, &c.) Order 1907
- Holmfield and Southowram Light Railway (Extension of Time) Order 1907
- Leicester and District Light Railways (Extension of Time) Order 1907
- Llanelly and District Light Railways Order 1907
- Mansfield and District Light Railways (Extensions) Order 1907 (Cd. 3487)
- Warrington and Northwich Light Railways (Extension of Time) Order 1907 (Cd. 3352)
- Wolverhampton and Cannock Chase Railway (Light Railway) Order 1907

===== 1908 =====
- London and North Western Railway (Dyserth and Newmarket Light Railway) Order 1908
- Mid-Lincolnshire Light Railway Order 1908
- Tanat Valley Light Railway (Additional Powers) Order 1908
- Tickhill Light Railway (Amendment and Transfer) Order 1908
- York Corporation Light Railways Order 1908

===== 1909 =====
- Aldershot and Farnborough Light Railway Order 1909
- Burry Port and Gwendreath Valley Railway (Light Railway) Order 1909 (Cd. 4778)
- County of Middlesex Light Railways (Extension of Time) Order 1909
- Crewkerne, South Petherton, and Martock Light Railway Order 1909
- Dover, St Margaret's, and Martin Mill Light Railway Order 1909
- Falkland Light Railway (Extension of Time) Order 1909
- Halesowen Light Railways (Transfer, &c.) Order 1909
- Lampeter, Aberayton, and New Quay Light Railway (Amendment) Order 1909
- Mid-Suffolk Light Railway (Amendment) Order 1909
- Padstow, Bedruthan, and Mawgan Light Railway (Extension of Time) Order 1909
- Shropshire and Montgomeryshire Light Railway Order 1909
- Southend-on-Sea Light Railways (Revival and Extension of Time) Order 1909

==== 1910-1919 ====
===== 1910 =====
- Axholme Joint Railway (Hatfield Moor Extension Light Railway) Order 1910 (Cd. 5144)
- Bacup Corporation Light Railway Order 1910
- Clayton West and Darton Light Railway (Extension of Time and Amendment) Order 1910 (Cd. 5141)
- Derwent Valley Light Railway (Extension of Time) Order 1910
- Dolgarrog Light Railway Order 1910
- Llanelly and District Light Railways (Revival and Extension of Time) Order 1910
- Mawddwy Railway (Light Railway) Order 1910 (Cd. 5143)
- Portsmouth and Hayling Light Railway (Extension of Time) Order 1910
- Shropshire and Montgomeryshire Light Railway (Amendment) Order 1910
- Southend and Colchester Light Railways (Amendment) Order 1910 (Cd. 5532)
- Western-super-Mare Junction Light Railway Order 1910
- Wolverhampton and Cannock Chase Railway (Light Railway) Extension of Time Order 1910

===== 1911 =====
- Barton and Immingham Light Railway (Extension of Time) Order 1911 (Cd. 5772)
- Blackburn, Whalley, and Padiham Light Railways (Revival and Extension of Time) Order 1911 (Cd. 5695)
- Burry Port and Gwendreath Valley Railway (Light Railway Extension) Order 1911 (Cd. 5919)
- County of Hertford (Cheshunt) Light Railways Order 1911 (Cd. 5915)
- Derwent Valley Light Railway (Amendment) Order 1911
- Doncaster Corporation Light Railways (Extension) Order 1911 (Cd. 5801)
- East Kent Light Railways Order 1911
- East Kent Light Railways (Extensions) Order 1911
- Elsenham and Thaxted Light Railway Order 1911 (Cd. 5694)
- Falkland Light Railway (Extension of Time) Order 1911
- Great Northern (Kirkstead and Little Steeping) Light Railway Order 1911
- Leek, Caldon Low, and Hartington Light Railways (Borrowing Powers) Order 1911
- Malvern (Funicular) Light Railway Order 1911 (Cd. 5914)
- Mid-Lincolnshire Light Railway (Extension of Time) Order 1911
- Morley Corporation Light Railways Order 1911 (Cd. 5916)
- North Lindsey Light Railways (Amendment) Order 1911 (Cd. 5696)
- Tarporley Light Railway (Revival and Extension of Time) Order 1911 (Cd. 5913)

===== 1912 =====
- Avonmouth Light Railway (Revival and Extension of Time) Order 1912 (Cd. 6219)
- Birmingham Corporation Light Railway Order 1912 (Cd. 6412)
- Clayton-le-Moors Light Railway Order 1912 (Cd. 6254)
- East Kent Light Railways (Extensions) Order 1912 (Cd. 6500)
- Halesowen Light Railways (Extensions, &c.) Order 1912 (Cd. 6411)
- Llandudno and Colwyn Bay Light Railway (Extension No. 2) Order 1912 (Cd. 6409)
- Quarry Bank and District Light Railway (Transfer, &c.) Order 1912 (Cd. 6410)
- Southend-on-Sea Light Railways (Extensions) Order 1912 (Cd. 6218)
- York Corporation Light Railways (Extensions) Order 1912 (Cd. 6458)

===== 1913 =====
- Birmingham Corporation (Quinton) Light Railway Order 1913 (Cd. 7122)
- Glamorgan County Council (Morriston to Pontardawe) Light Railways (Revival as to Part) Order 1913 (Cd. 6902)
- Harrington and Lowca Light Railway Order 1913 (Cd. 6900)
- London and North Western Railway (Wolverhampton and Cannock Chase Light Railway) Transfer and Amendment Order 1913 (Cd. 7257)
- North Lindsey Light Railways (Amendment) Order 1913 (Cd. 6901)
- Southwold Harbour Light Railway Order 1913 (Cd. 7123)
- West Hartlepool Light Railways (Amendment) Order 1913 (Cd. 7249)

===== 1914 =====
- County of Hertford Light Railways (Watford and Bushey Abandonment) Order 1914 (Cd. 7284)
- Burythorpe Light Railway Order 1914 (Cd. 7344)
- Doncaster Corporation Light Railways (Extensions) Order 1914 (Cd. 7406)
- Glamorgan County Council (Morriston to Pontardawe) Light Railways Order 1914
- Merthyr Tydfil Light Railway (Amendment) Order 1914 (Cd. 7256)
- North Devon and Cornwall Junction Light Railway Order 1914 (Cd. 7598)
- North Staffordshire Railway (Trentham, Newcastle-under-Lyme, and Silverdale) Light Railways Order 1914 (Cd. 7397)
- Swaledale Light Railway Order 1914
- Swansea Corporation Light Railways (Extension) Order 1914
- York Corporation Light Railways (Extension) Order 1914

===== 1915 =====
- Clayton-le-Moors Light Railway (Extension of Time) Order 1915 (Cd. 7943)
- Dearne District Light Railways Order 1915 (Cd. 8660)
- Derwent Valley Light Railway (Additional Capital) Order 1915 (Cd. 8661)
- Hutton Magna Light Railway Order 1915 (Cd. 7931)
- London and North Western Railway (Dyserth and Newmarket) Light Railway Order 1915
- North Lindsey Light Railways (Amendment) Order 1915
- West Sussex Light Railway Order 1915 (Cd. 8627)

===== 1916 =====
- Milford and Saint Bride's Light Railway Order 1916 (Cd. 8676)
- Axholme Joint Railway (Hatfield Moor Extension) Light Railway (Revival of Powers) Order 1917 (Cd. 8687)
- South Yorkshire Joint Line (Firbeck Light Railway) Order 1916 (Cd. 8688)

===== 1917 =====
- Darlington Light Railways (Amendment) Order 1917 (Cd. 8701)
- Kent and East Sussex Light Railway (Amendment) Order 1917 (Cd. 8703)
- Newport Light Railway Order 1917 (Cd. 8791)

===== 1918 =====
- Lancashire and Yorkshire Railway (Formby Light Railways) Order 1918 (Cd. 9161)
- Swansea Corporation Light Railways (Extensions) (Revival and Extension of Time) Order 1918 (Cd. 8979)

===== 1919 =====
- Ashover Light Railway Order 1919 (Cmd. 496)
- De Trafford Light Railway Order 1919 (Cmd. 245)
- Edge Hill Light Railway Order 1919 (Cmd. 56)
- Hooton Light Railway Order 1919 (Cmd. 84)
- Liverpool and Prescot Light Railway (Amendment) Order 1919 (Cmd. 495)
- Lostock Light Railways Order 1919 (Cmd. 311)
- Nottingham Colwick Estates Light Railway Order 1919 (Cmd. 537)

==== 1920-1929 ====
===== 1920 =====
- Barrington Light Railway Order 1920 (Cmd. 1003)
- Brighton Corporation Light Railways Order 1920 (Cmd. 986)
- East Kent Light Railways (Extensions) Order 1920 (Cmd. 1004)
- Mansfield and District Light Railways (Extensions) Order 1920 (Cmd. 855)
- Middleton Light Railways (Amendment) Order 1920 (Cmd. 743)
- Peterborough and District Light Railways (Amendment) Order 1920 (Cmd. 742)
- Sand Hutton Light Railway Order 1920 (Cmd. 807)
- Southend-on-Sea Light Railways (Extension) Order 1920 (Cmd. 1065)
- South Shields Corporation Light Railway Order 1920 (Cmd. 1019)
- Spen Valley Light Railways (Amendment) Order 1920 (Cmd. 860)
- Weston Point Light Railway Order 1920 (Cmd. 1087)

===== 1921 =====
- Cambrian Railways (Tanat Valley Light Railway Transfer) Order 1921 (Cmd. 1229)
- Llantrisant Light Railway Order 1921 (Cmd. 1149)
- Lee-on-the-Solent Light Railway Order 1921 (SR&O 1922/216)
- London and North Western (Wolverhampton and Cannock Chase Light Railway) Amendment Order 1921 (Cmd. 1389)
- Totton, Hythe and Fawley Light Railway Order 1921 (SR&O 1922/335)

===== 1922 =====
- Newcastle-upon-Tyne Corporation Light Railway Order 1922 (SR&O 1922/1167)
- Welsh Highland Railway (Light Railway) Order 1922 (SR&O 1922/432)

===== 1923 =====
- Newcastle-upon-Tyne Corporation Light Railway (Extension) Order 1923 (SR&O 1923/704)
- Welsh Highland Railway (Light Railway) Order 1923 (SR&O 1923/275)

===== 1924 =====
- Callington Light Railway (Abandonment) Order 1924 (SR&O 1924/597)
- Longridge and Hellifield Light Railway Order 1924 (SR&O 1924/582)
- Longridge and Hellifield Light Railway (Amendment) Order 1924 (SR&O 1924/1324)

===== 1926 =====
- Mansfield and District Light Railways (Extensions &c.) Order 1926 (SR&O 1926/1665)
- Romney, Hythe and Dymchurch Light Railway Order 1926 (SR&O 1926/741)

===== 1927 =====
- Heywood and Middleton Light Railway Order 1927 (SR&O 1927/363)
- Hooton Light Railway (Winding Up) Order 1927 (SR&O 1927/846)
- London Midland and Scottish Railway (Burton and Ashby Light Railway Abandonment) Order 1927 (SR&O 1927/94)
- London Midland and Scottish and Great Western Companies (Avonmouth Light Railway Transfer and Amendment) Order 1927 (SR&O 1927/388)
- Milford and St Bride's Bay Light Railway (Extension of Time, etc.) Order 1927 (SR&O 1927/629)
- Pontypridd Light Railway Order 1927 (SR&O 1927/885)

===== 1928 =====
- Romney, Hythe and Dymchurch Light Railway (Extension) Order 1928 (SR&O 1928/613)
- Southern Heights Light Railway Order 1928 (SR&O 1928/265)

==== 1930-1939 ====
===== 1932 =====
- County of Middlesex Light Railway (Extension) Order 1932 (SR&O 1932/38)
- Sand Hutton Light Railway Company (Winding-Up) Order 1932 (SR&O 1932/310)

===== 1934 =====
- Wincham Light Railway Order 1934 (SR&O 1934/362)

==== 1960-1969 ====
===== 1960 =====
- British Transport Commission (Horsted Keynes and Sheffield Park) Light Railway Order 1960 (SI 1960/1022)

==== 1970-1979 ====
===== 1970 =====
- British Railways Board (Severn Valley) Light Railway Order 1970 (SI 1970/7)
- British Railways Board (Severn Valley) Light Railway (Transfer) Order 1970 (SI 1970/778)

===== 1973 =====
- British Railways Board (Meon Valley) Light Railway Order 1973 (SI 1973/785)
- British Railways Board (Severn Valley) Light Railway Order 1973 (SI 1973/357)
- British Railways Board (Sheringham and Weybourne) Light Railway Order 1973 (SI 1973/998)
- Derwent Valley Light Railway Order 1973 (SI 1973/537)

===== 1974 =====
- British Railways Board (Minehead Branch) Light Railway Order 1974 (SI 1974/1933)
- British Railways Board (Severn Valley) Light Railway (Transfer) Order 1974 (SI 1974/643)
- British Railways Board (Whitby and Pickering) Light Railway Order 1974 (SI 1974/1857)
- Romney, Hythe and Dymchurch Light Railway (Amendment) Order 1974 (SI 1974/1024)
- Severn Valley Light Railway (Transfer) Order 1974 (SI 1974/642)

===== 1975 =====
- Conwy Mussel Fishery (Jetty Hoist) Light Railway Order 1975 (SI 1975/962)
- GKN Tremorfa Works Light Railway Order 1975 (SI 1975/1480)

===== 1977 =====
- Abergwili and Llanpumsaint Light Railway Order 1977 (SI 1977/1741)
- Alton and Alresford Light Railway Order 1977 (SI 1977/519)
- Nene Valley Light Railway Order 1977 (SI 1977/862)

===== 1978 =====
- Cranmore Light Railway Order 1978 (SI 1978/1937)
- Isle of Wight (Havenstreet and Wootton) Light Railway Order 1978 (SI 1978/1119)
- Loughborough and Birstall Light Railway Order 1978 (SI 1978/471)

===== 1979 =====
- National Coal Board Butterwell Light Railway Order 1979 (SI 1979/1421)
- Steamtown Light Railway Order 1979 (SI 1979/317)
- Yorkshire Dales Light Railway Order 1979 (SI 1979/1270)

==== 1980-1989 ====
===== 1980 =====
- Beddgelert Siding Light Railway Order 1980 (SI 1980/667)
- Brecon Mountain Railway (Light Railway) Order 1980 (SI 1980/671)
- Cowes and Newport Light Railway Order 1980 (SI 1980/1660)
- Newcastle Emlyn Branch Light Railway Order 1980 (SI 1980/1969)

===== 1981 =====
- Blaenau Ffestiniog (Central Station) Light Railway Order 1981 (SI 1981/62)
- Midland Railway Centre Light Railway Order 1981 (SI 1981/1083)
- Tyne and Wear County Council (Bowes Railway) Light Railway Order 1981 (SI 1981/616)

===== 1982 =====
- Launceston Light Railway Order 1982 (SI 1982/1621)
- Wells and Walsingham Railway Light Railway Order 1982 (SI 1982/521)

===== 1983 =====
- Gloucestershire Warwickshire Light Railway Order 1983 (SI 1983/1955)

===== 1984 =====
- Llangollen and Corwen Light Railway Order 1984 (SI 1984/558)
- Severn Valley Light Railway Order 1984 (SI 1984/1202)

===== 1985 =====
- Alton Station Light Railway Order 1985 (SI 1985/810)
- Lydney and Parkend Light Railway Order 1985 (SI 1985/844)
- Pilkington UK5 Light Railway Order 1985 (SI 1985/725)
- Rheilffordd Llyn Tegid Light Railway Order 1985 (SI 1985/1578)
- Six Pit and Upper Bank Junctions Light Railway Order 1985 (SI 1985/747)

===== 1986 =====
- Bluebell Extension Light Railway Order 1986 (SI 1986/343)
- Bo'ness and Kinneil Light Railway Order 1986 (SI 1986/174)
- East Lancashire Light Railway Order 1986 (SI 1986/277)
- Nene Valley Light Railway Order 1986 (SI 1986/1000)
- Vickers Shipbuilding and Engineering Limited (Barrow-in-Furness) Light Railway Order 1986 (SI 1986/2150)

===== 1987 =====
- Derwent Valley Railway (Transfer) Light Railway Order 1987 (SI 1987/75)
- North Norfolk (Extension and Amendment) Light Railway Order 1987 (SI 1987/950)
- South Tynedale Railway (Light Railway) Order 1987 (SI 1987/1984)
- Swanage Light Railway Order 1987 (SI 1987/1443)
- Yorkshire Dales Light Railway Order 1987 (SI 1987/1088)

===== 1988 =====
- Kinneil and Manuel Light Railway Order 1988 (SI 1988/725)

===== 1989 =====
- Bodmin Railway Centre Light Railway Order 1989 (SI 1989/1625)
- British Railways Board (Vale of Rheidol) Light Railway (Amendment) Order 1989 (SI 1989/599)
- Bure Valley Railway Light Railway Order 1989 (SI 1989/835)
- Cholsey and Wallingford Light Railway Order 1989 (SI 1989/1833)

==== 1990-1999 ====
===== 1990 =====
- Peak Rail Light Railway Order 1990 (SI 1990/2350)

===== 1991 =====
- Bitton Light Railway Order 1991 (SI 1991/134)
- Bure Valley Railway Light Railway (Amendment) Order 1991 (SI 1991/2136)
- Grimsby and Louth Light Railway Order 1991 (SI 1991/2210)
- Isle of Wight Light Railway Order 1991 (SI 1991/1619)
- Kirklees Light Railway Order 1991 (SI 1991/2194)
- Leicester North Station Light Railway Order 1991 (SI 1991/1965)
- North Tyneside Steam Railway Light Railway Order 1991 (SI 1991/933)
- Peak Rail Light Railway Order 1991 (SI 1991/2812)
- Saundersfoot Steam Railway (Light Railway) Order 1991 (SI 1991/2682)
- Tanfield Railway (Causey Extension) Light Railway Order 1991 (SI 1991/1162)
- Yorkshire Dales Light Railway Order 1991 (SI 1991/1111)

===== 1992 =====
- Brechin and Bridge of Dun Light Railway Order 1992 (SI 1992/1267)
- Cholsey and Wallingford Light Railway (Extension and Amendment) Order 1992 (SI 1992/1113)
- Dart Valley Light Railway Plc (Totnes and Ashburton) Light Railway (Transfer) Order 1992 (SI 1992/926)

===== 1993 =====
- East Kent Light Railway Order 1993 (SI 1993/2154)
- Manchester, Liverpool Road (Castlefield Properties Limited) Light Railway Order 1993 (SI 1993/2153)
- Nene Valley Light Railway (Transfer) Order 1993 (SI 1993/1402)
- Peak Rail Light Railway Order 1993 (SI 1993/1083)
- Swanage Light Railway (Extension) Order 1993 (SI 1993/1607)
- Tunbridge Wells and Eridge Light Railway Order 1993 (SI 1993/1651)

===== 1994 =====
- Bowes Extension Light Railway Order 1994 (SI 1994/691)
- Chappel and Wakes Colne Light Railway Order 1994 (SI 1994/84)
- Lydney and Parkend Light Railway (Extension and Amendment) Order 1994 (SI 1994/1331)
- Wells and Walsingham Light Railway (Amendment) Order 1994 (SI 1994/260)
- Wirral Tramway Light Railway Order 1994 (SI 1994/1761)

===== 1995 =====
- Foxfield Light Railway Order 1995 (SI 1995/1236)
- Low Moor Tramway Light Railway Order 1995 (SI 1995/2501)
- Northampton and Lamport Light Railway Order 1995 (SI 1995/1300)
- Oswestry Light Railway Order 1995 (SI 1995/2142)
- Welsh Highland Railway (Transfer) Light Railway Order 1995 (SI 1995/861)

===== 1996 =====
- Bodmin and Wenford Light Railway Order 1996 (SI 1996/2867)
- Churnet Valley Light Railway Order 1996 (SI 1996/1267)
- Duffield and Wirksworth Light Railway Order 1996 (SI 1996/2660)
- South Tynedale Railway (Light Railway) Order 1996 (SI 1996/1829)

===== 1997 =====
- Caernarfon Railway Light Railway Order 1997 (SI 1997/2534)
- Yorkshire Dales Light Railway Order 1997 (SI 1997/102)

===== 1998 =====
- Strathspey Light Railway Order 1998 (SI 1998/1312)

===== 1999 =====
- Keith and Dufftown Light Railway Order 1999 (SI 1999/2382)

==== 2000- ====
- East Lancashire (Heywood Extension) Light Railway Order 2002 (SI 2002/1384)
- Banchory and Crathes Light Railway Order 2012 (SI 2012/345)

=== Preserved ===
- Kent and East Sussex Railway, opened in 1900, final section closed in 1970 but part reopened in stages from 1974.
- Vale of Rheidol Light Railway, operated continuously since 1902
- Welshpool and Llanfair Light Railway, opened in 1903, closed in 1956, reconstructed and reopened between 1963 and 1981 on the entire route except Welshpool town section
- Mid-Suffolk Light Railway, opened in 1905, closed in 1952, very short section opened over 40 years later
- Derwent Valley Light Railway, opened in 1913, short section operating as heritage

=== Closed ===
Railway name	Opened	Closed	Length	Notes
Lee-on-Solent Light Railway	12 May 1894	30 September 1935	3 miles	Re-authorized under the act in 1899.
Weston, Clevedon and Portishead Light Railway	1 December 1897	1940	13.8 mi (22.2 km)	Re-authorized under the act in 1899. Extension from Clevendon to Portishead opened 7 August 1907. Land cleared in 1942-43 for the war effort.
Bankfoot Light Railway	1898	??	??	
Corringham Light Railway	1 January 1901	(20 September 1971)	3 1/2 miles	Part of it currently an ExxonMobil junction.
Basingstoke and Alton Light Railway	1 June 1901	1936	12 mi (19 km)	Track removed in 1917, then re-laid in 1924
Lauder Light Railway	2 July 1901	30 September 1958	??	
Poole and District Light Railway	1901	??	??	
Sheppey Light Railway	1901	4 December 1950	??	
Leadhills and Wanlockhead Light Railway	1901-2	1938	??	Partially opened October 1901, fully opened October 1902. Part now used by the narrow gauge Leadhills and Wanlockhead Railway
Fraserburgh to St Combs (branch) Light Railway	1 July 1903	1965	??	
Wick and Lybster Light Railway	1 July 1903	1 April 1944	13 mi 39 chains (21.7 km)	
Tanat Valley Light Railway	5 January 1904	December 1960	15 mi (24 km)	A heritage railway bearing the name was established in 2009, operating a short line close to the original alignment, of which nothing was ever rebuilt.
Kelvedon and Tollesbury Light Railway	1 October 1904	9 September 1962	8 mi 42 chains (13.7 km)	
Leek and Manifold Valley Light Railway	1904	3 March 1934	8.25 mi (13.28 km)	
Cairn Valley Light Railway	28 February 1905	4 July 1949	??	
Bentley and Bordon Light Railway	11 December 1905	4 April 1966	??	
Horton Light Railway	1905	1950?	??	Track was lifted around 1950. Closure date unknown.
Campbeltown and Machrihanish Light Railway	18 August 1906	1934	??	Replaced a previous industrial railway built in 1876.
Falkland Light Railway	1906	??	??	
North Lindsey Light Railway	1906	1951	??	
Maidens and Dunure Light Railway	1906	1930	20 mi (32 km)	A section serving a holiday camp at Heads of Ayr remained open until 1968.
Cleobury Mortimer and Ditton Priors Light Railway	21 November 1908	1960	12 mi (19 km)	
Bere Alston and Calstock Light Railway	1908	??	??	Branch line.
Shropshire and Montgomeryshire Light Railway	1911	1960	??	
Elsenham and Thaxted Light Railway	1 April 1913	1 June 1953	5.5 mi (8.9 km)	
Sand Hutton Light Railway	1922	1932	5.25 mi (8.45 km)	Replaced a previous Sand Hutton Miniature Railway, built in 1912.
Ashover Light Railway	1924-1925?	31 March 1950	7.25 mi (11.67 km)	
North Devon and Cornwall Junction Light Railway	27 July 1925	1 March 1965	??	Upgrade of a previous industrial tramway.
Cromarty and Dingwall Light Railway	never opened	-	??	Construction never completed, track lifted by 1920.

== Railways operated under the act ==
- Heart of Wales Line, since 1972

A number of railways have, over the years, been built on private land, with names that end in "Light Railway". These have not needed parliamentary powers or a light railway order. The name has only reflected the light nature of the railway. Many miniature railways are named in this way.

== Railways authorised under the act, but not built ==
- North Holderness Light Railway (1897)
- Wotton-under-Edge Light Railway (1899)
- Lastingham and Rosedale Light Railway (1900)
- Falkland Light Railway (1906)
- Headcorn and Maidstone Junction Light Railway (1906)
- Trentham, Newcastle-under-Lyme and Silverdale Light Railway (1914)
- Southern Heights Light Railway (1929)

== Subsequent developments ==
Section 5 of the act was repealed by section 1(1) of, and part XIII of schedule 1 to, the Statute Law (Repeals) Act 1986, which came into force on 2 May 1986.

The whole act was repealed for England and Wales by section 68(1) of, and part I of schedule 4 to, the Transport and Works Act 1992, which came into force on 1 January 1993.
