= Doncaster Tramway =

Electric tram network, 1902 to 1935

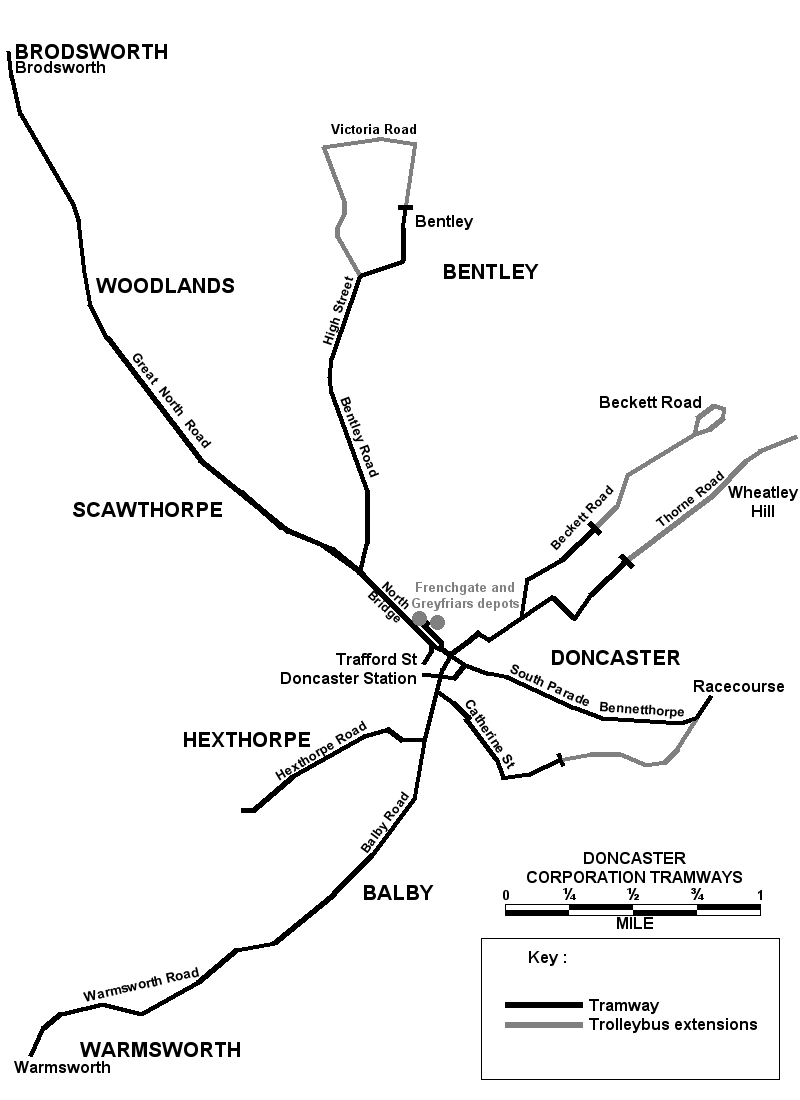
- The Doncaster Tramway network

Overview
- Headquarters: Doncaster
- Locale: England
- Dates of operation: 1902–1935
- Successor: Abandoned

Technical
- Track gauge: 4 ft 8 1/2 in (1,435 mm)

Doncaster Corporation Tramways was an electric tramway network serving the town of Doncaster, England. It was authorised in 1899, and the first route to Bentley opened in 1902. This remained separated from the rest of the system until North Bridge was built to carry traffic over the Great Northern Railway main line to Edinburgh. Soon afterwards, deep mining of coal began in the area, and several extensions to the system were made between 1913 and 1916 to serve new communities which developed around the pit heads. The Racecourse route was unusual, in that it had balloon loops at both ends to enable almost continuous running on race days, a feature that was not common in England, and only found favour in Europe in the 1950s and 1960s.

From 1913 to 1919, the tramways were reasonably profitable, but suffered from lack of maintenance during World War I, and the poor construction methods used to lay the track. The system had been financed by loans repayable over 40 years, and with the track needing replacement after half of that period, it was uneconomic to carry out the work. The corporation decided to replace the system with motor buses in 1922, but in 1926 concluded that trolleybuses would be more economical. The first route of the Doncaster trolleybus system was again that to Bentley, opened in 1928, and by 1931, all of the authorised routes had been converted. The tramway to Brodsworth continued in use until 1935, when it was replaced by motor buses. Trolleybuses ran for somewhat longer than the trams had, with the system finally closing in 1963.

The service was provided by a total of 47 tramcars, all but one of them being double-deck vehicles running on 4-wheel chassis. Most were supplied by the Electric Railway and Tramway Carriage Works of Preston, or their successor, the United Electric Car Company. One single-deck vehicle was purchased second-hand in 1917 in an attempt to reduce costs on the unprofitable Avenue Road route, but local crews would not allow one-man operation, and it saw little use. The cars were stabled in two depots on Greyfriars Road. The main depot was built for the opening of the system, and the second in 1920 to house cars bought for an extension to Rossington which did not go ahead.

== History ==
Public transport in Doncaster began in 1887, when an undertaker called J. G. Steadman started running horse buses in the town. Two years later, the grocers Hodgson & Hepworth also started running buses, to be joined by J. Stoppani soon afterwards. Between them, the buses served Avenue Road, Balby, Bentley, Hexthorpe, Hyde Park and the Racecourse. There had been proposals for a horse tramway in 1878, and another for a tramway to Balby in 1895, but neither scheme had progressed past the planning stage. However, in 1898 a more serious contender appeared, when British Electric Traction proposed tramways serving Avenue Road, Balby, Bentley and Hexthorpe, and began applying for permission to build them.

Doncaster Corporation at the time were planning to build a power station to supply a municipal lighting scheme, and an electric tramway would make that more economic, using electricity all day, rather than only when it was dark. They were keen to operate their own services, and so proposed an alternative. British Electric Traction then withdrew their scheme, but offered to run the corporation's system for them, an offer which was declined. They were probably the first council to apply for powers for a tramway using the provisions of the Light Railways Act 1896, rather than the Tramways Act 1870 (33 & 34 Vict. c. 78). A hearing took place in Doncaster in February 1899, at which the Great Northern Railway objected to a level crossing with their line from London to Edinburgh. This was upheld, and the route to Bentley was to be detached from the rest of the system until a bridge could be built. The proposed budget for the scheme was £70,000. The works were authorised by the Doncaster Corporation Light Railways Order 1899, and after a fact-finding visit to Kingston upon Hull, they decided to use Hull's rather quirky system of centre-grooved rail, becoming the only other tramway in the country to do so. Joints in the track were cut diagonally, to make for a smoother ride over the joint.

Construction of the standard gauge 4 ft 8 1/2 in (1,435 mm) network began in 1901, and in order to cut costs, the foundations were not made as substantial as they should have been, resulting in ongoing problems with the track for years afterwards. The council borrowed money to fund the scheme, with the loans to be paid back over forty years, which was a longer period than the life expectancy of the track. The rails were bought from Belgium, while the points were provided by Hadfields of Sheffield. The first parts of the town to benefit from the tramway were in the south west, with a route from Station Road along St Sepulchre Gate to Balby High Street, and a branch from Hexthorpe Road to reach Old Hexthorpe, which opened on 2 June 1902. Later that month, the tramway from St Sepulchre Gate along Hall Gate, South Parade and Bennetthorpe Road to the Racecourse opened on 30 June. A short branch from St Sepulchre Gate to Jarrett Street followed on 1 August, and this was extended in October to Childers Street in the Hyde Park area. The tracks along Bentley Road to Bentley High Street opened on 27 October, but that part of the system remained isolated because of the lack of a crossing over the railway. Next to open was the tramway along Nether Hall Road to Avenue Road on 15 January 1903, and a short branch from this line along Beckett Road on 17 August. Another short branch from St Sepulchre Gate to Oxford Street opened on 25 November 1903, but was not profitable, and closed after two years.

Several additional light railway orders were required to authorise extensions and deviations to the original plans. These were the Doncaster Corporation Light Railways (Deviation &c.) Order 1902, the Doncaster Corporation Light Railways (Extensions) Order 1903, the Doncaster Corporation Light Railways (Extension) Order 1911 and the Doncaster Corporation Light Railways (Extensions) Order 1914. These did not include the connection of the Bentley route to the rest of the system, which was authorised as part of the powers obtained in 1908 to build North Bridge. This period saw the development of deep coal mining in the area, and the extensions were to serve new communities that grew up around the pit heads. The Doncaster Corporation Light Railways (Extension) Order 1911 saw extensions from Bentley to New Bentley, which opened on 20 March 1913, and from Balby to Warmsworth, which followed on 4 February 1915. The Doncaster Corporation Light Railways (Extensions) Order 1914 authorised a line to Brodsworth, another mining village, which opened on 21 February 1916. Rather than run along the roads, the Brodsworth route was built on a reserved formation alongside the Great North Road, past Scawthorpe and Woodlands.

The plans for the tramway had envisaged single track with passing places, but it was realised that this would be inadequate particularly for the Racecourse route, which saw tens of thousands of people needing transport to and from the races. The Board of Trade was able to authorise doubling of the track without recourse to Parliament. The Doncaster Corporation Light Railways (Deviation &c.) Order 1902 had also allowed a siding to be built beside the stands, and although most of the route was double track, the section at the bottom end of High Street was not, as it was too narrow. The vast crowds of St Leger Day in 1902 showed that getting trams to the Station Road terminus under these conditions was almost impossible, and the Doncaster Corporation Light Railways (Extensions) Order 1903 sought to address this issue. The Racecourse siding became a balloon loop, and another loop was constructed at the town end, enabling cars to pass through the High Street section in one direction only and return to the Racecourse via another single track along Printing Office Street and Priory Place. Few other loop terminals were constructed in England, and they only came into general use in Europe in the 1950s and 1960s.

The disadvantage of using an unusual type of rail surfaced when the North Bridge was being built, as steel manufacturers were not interested in producing such a small quantity of rail, and the 225 tons required were bought from Hull. The bridge was due to be opened on 12 May 1910, but the death of King Edward VII six days earlier meant that the opening ceremony was cancelled, and it opened without formal celebration. The Brodsworth route was debated in 1911–12, and there were moves to use trolleybuses rather than trams. The Tramways Committee visited the newly-opened trolleybus systems in Bradford and Leeds to see them in operation. They were sufficiently impressed, that when the council reconsidered the route, there were eleven votes for trams and seven for trolleybuses. A proposal to use motor buses was defeated by a larger margin.

=== Demise ===
In the early 1920s, there was increasing competition from private motor buses, and the corporation decided to close down the tramways. They obtained powers to run their own motor buses in 1922, and purchased their first six vehicles from the Bristol Tramways and Carriage Company. The trams on the Avenue Road route were replaced by motor buses on 1 May 1925, and the service was extended to Wheatley Hills at the same time. However, the corporation took the decision in 1926 to replace the trams with trolleybuses, and obtained powers to convert their lines to this new form of traction. The Brodsworth route was excluded from this, but the Wheatley Hills route was included, even though the trams had already been replaced. The powers were enshrined in the Doncaster Corporation Act 1926, and Clough, Smith & Co. were contracted to modify the overhead wiring. Driver training for the trolleybuses took place in spring 1928 on the Racecourse route. As the conversion of the wiring was not complete, they ran for part of the way with one trolley boom running on the tramway wire and the other connected to a skate that ran on the tram tracks to complete the electrical circuit.

The first route where the conversion was completed was that to Bentley, where the trams ceased to run on 21 August 1928. Next to go was the Hexthorpe route on 30 June 1929 and the Beckett Road route on 30 July 1929. On 15 January 1930, the Racecourse and Hyde Park services terminated, and in March 1931, trolleybuses replaced motor buses on the route to Wheatley Hills. Balby and Warmsworth services were withdrawn on 25 July 1931, leaving just the trams on the Brodsworth service. These continued to run until 1935, but during April, cars 40 and 47 caught fire, with No.40 being partially destroyed. The final trams ran on 8 June, but it seems likely that the service was provided by both trams and motor buses from 23 March, since when the final eight trams were sold for scrap, only four of them were in working order.

=== Finance ===
The initial construction was financed by loans, to be paid back over 40 years. The Oxford Street route was not profitable, and for the 27-day period beginning 7 December 1903, just £15 was raised by carrying 3,633 passengers. By contrast, the Balby route carried over 46,000 passengers in the same period, yielding £187. The results of the extension of the Bentley route to New Bentley were dramatic, with revenue rising from £3,700 in 1911 to £67,160 in 1913. Prior to 1913, there had only been two years where the accounts had shown a small surplus, but from 1913 to 1919 the enterprise was profitable. 1919 was the most profitable year, but there were underlying problems. Levels of traffic had risen because of the war, but costs had risen at a faster rate. Fares had been fixed by the enabling legislation, as prices were stable at the time, and there was no concept of coping with inflation. Parliament made partial provision for this with the passing of the Tramways (Increase of Charges) Act 1920, but individual tramways still had to apply to adjust their fares. Doncaster made an application in 1920 and was successful.

The Bentley line closed largely due to economic pressures. There had been complaints about the track since 1912, due to its poor construction. In 1922, West Yorkshire County Council announced that it intended to relay the road at a higher level, and this would have involved moving the tracks. Doncaster were faced with the problem that this was uneconomic, as the original loans would not be repaid for a further 20 years, and traffic receipts would not cover the finance costs of the original loans and of new ones required to the replace the worn-out track. The Bentley route was one of the most profitable, but if it was uneconomic to reconstruct it, then it would not be so for any of the other routes either. Trolleybuses initially solved this conundrum, since they did not require the track to be reconstructed, and revenue on the Bentley route increased by 50 per cent when they were introduced, while for the rest of the system it was around 38 per cent.

=== Tram depots ===
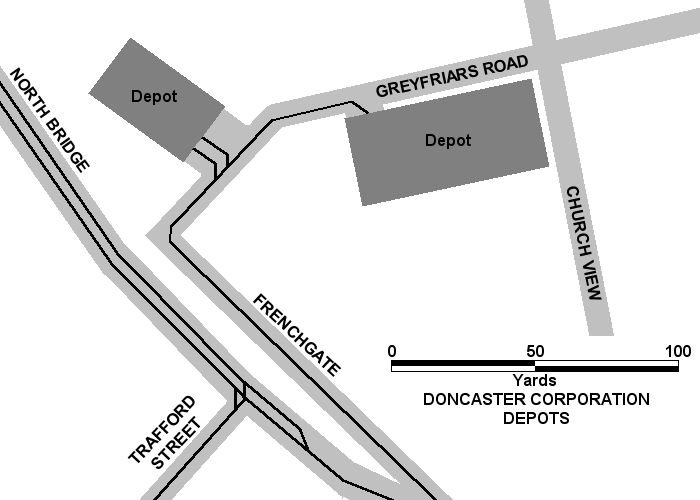
Doncaster trams' depots.

When the system was proposed, there were plans to build three depots. One was to be on Greyfriars Road, with a second using part of the Wool Market. However, this latter location was abandoned, and no work took place. The Greyfriars Road depot was located at SE 57269 03587, near to the power station and the east end of North Bridge. Because trams could not cross the Great Northern Railway on the level, a temporary stabling place was provided for four trams in an old barn at Marshgate, to the west of the railway. This was not in a good state of repair, and blew down in late 1904 or early 1905, to be replaced by a new shed which could hold three cars.

When an extension from the Racecourse to Rossington was planned in 1919, ten new trams were ordered, and since the existing depot would not be large enough, an annexe was planned. Although the Rossington link did not go ahead, the order for the trams could not be cancelled, and so they and the annexe arrived in 1920. This was also known as the Car Repairing Shed, and was located on the north side of Greyfriars Road, next to Frenchgate at SE 57174 03591. The main depot had seven running roads with a paintshop at the eastern end, while the smaller annexe had three running roads.

== Fleet ==
For the opening of the system, 15 trams were acquired from the Electric Railway and Tramway Carriage Works of Preston, which were mounted on Brill 6-foot (1.8 m) 4-wheeled trucks. Doncaster had originally planned to order single-deck cars, but opted instead for a standard design. The staircases were reversed, running from the inner end of the front or rear platform and curving around the outside edge of the vehicle. This was followed by two batches of five cars each in 1903, giving a total of 25 cars to work the service. Cars 5 to 16 and 22 to 25 were fitted with top covers in four batches between 1907 and 1913. Most of the top covers were built by Dick, Kerr, but the third batch was supplied by Brush. When the top covers were fitted, the stairs were replaced by direct ones. Dick, Kerr had supplied the controllers for all of these vehicles, but they were later replaced by equipment from British Thomson-Houston. At least two of these trams had their trucks lengthened to 7 feet (2.1 m) between 1913 and 1915. Two more were fitted with new Peckham P22 trucks in 1922, with a wheelbase of 7 feet 6 inches (2.29 m).

The Electric Railway and Tramway Carriage Works changed their name to the United Electric Car Company in 1908, and a batch of seven vehicles were purchased from them in 1913, six fitted with 7-foot-6-inch (2.29 m) Peckham P22 trucks, and the final one, No.32, running on a 13-foot-6-inch (4.11 m) Warner Patent radial truck. This design of truck did not perform well, and it was replaced by an 8-foot-6-inch (2.59 m) Peckham P35 truck in 1925. Another batch of four similar cars with 8-foot-6-inch (2.59 m) Peckham P22 trucks were delivered in 1915–16, although the records are somewhat ambiguous about the year in which they actually arrived. All of these vehicles had top covers but open balconies at the outside ends.

The next car was obtained second-hand from Erith Urban District Council Tramways in 1917. It was a single-deck vehicle, and was designed to be one-man operated. It was intended for use on the unprofitable Avenue Road route, as a way of cutting costs, but local crews insisted that a 2-man crew was needed, and so it was little used. Some sources suggest it was withdrawn in 1918, but new advertisements were fitted in 1921, and it was relicensed in 1922, so this date is unlikely. It was scrapped in October 1925.

The final batch of ten cars were ordered from English Electric for an extension to Rossington, and the order could not be cancelled when the extension plan was abandoned. They ran on 8-foot-6-inch (2.59 m) Peckham P22 trucks. Besides the passenger vehicles, two works vehicles were also owned by the Corporation. The first was a water car and sweeper, bought in 1902, and equipped with two large water tanks to wet and sweep the dusty roads of the time. The brushes were powered by an additional electric motor. In winter it was used to sweep snow from the tracks, and was fitted with Jarrards rail scrapers, which removed debris from the grooves in the rails. There was also a former horse tram, which was built in 1903 and bought from York around 1912 for use as a trailer for sand and salt.

Car numbers	Type	In service	Withdrawn	Seating; Upper/lower deck	Builder
1–15	double deck open top	1902	1927, 1930	34/22	Electric Railway and Tramway Carriage Works
16–25	double deck open top	1903	1927–1930	34/22	Electric Railway and Tramway Carriage Works
26–31	double deck balcony	1913	1931–1932	36/22	United Electric Car Company, Preston
32	double deck balcony	1913	1931–1932	42/32	United Electric Car Co
33–36	double deck balcony	1915/1916	1932–1935	40/26	United Electric Car Co
37	single deck demi car	1917	1922	20	Milnes Voss
38–47	double deck vestibuled	1920	1933–1935	40/26	English Electric
none	water car and sweeper	1902	1925		Electric Railway and Tramway Carriage Works
none	sand and salt trailer	1912?	1935		unknown

== Future ==
In January 2013 it was announced that a proposed trial of Tram-train's linking Rotherham's Parkgate with Sheffield could lead to a similar scheme being rolled out in Doncaster. The extension of the Sheffield Supertram network to Rotherham using tram-trains was officially a Department of Transport experiment to prove the concept. The scheme was subject to delays and cost overruns, with the opening date pushed back from December 2015 to December 2018, and the cost rising from £15 million to £75 million. Despite the fact that the new vehicles could operate from an overhead supply at either 750V DC or 25kV AC, the decision was taken to electrify the National Rail section at 750V DC. There were significant interference issues, which led in part to the cost overrun. In 2019 a Sheffield City Region document outlined plans for an integrated rail network, including the extension of the Rotherham tram-train link to Doncaster and onwards to the Lakeside shopping complex, the Doncaster Sheffield Airport and Bawtry. The timeline that formed part of the report suggested that the section to Doncaster could be completed by 2028.

== Bibliography ==
- Bett; Gillham (1962). Great British Tramway Networks (4th ed.). London: The Light Railway Transport League.
- Buckley, Richard (2003). Trams and Trolleybuses in Doncaster. Barnsley, South Yorkshire, UK: Wharncliffe. ISBN 978-1-903425-29-9.
- Dyson, Andrew (7 December 2018). "Tram-train open for traffic". railfuture. Archived from the original on 27 July 2020.
- Jarvis, Dan (July 2019). "Integrated Rail Plan" (PDF). Sheffield City Region. Archived (PDF) from the original on 1 November 2019.
- Joyce, J.; King, J. S.; Newman, A. G. (1986). British Trolleybus Systems. London: Ian Allan Publishing. ISBN 978-0-7110-1647-7.
- LTHL, anonymous (2017). "Doncaster Corporation Transport 1902–1974" (PDF). Local Transport History Library. Archived (PDF) from the original on 3 April 2020.
- Prior, Gareth (19 July 2019). "Sheffield City Region look for tram-train extensions as part of rail plan". British Trams Online. Archived from the original on 27 July 2020.
- Turner, Keith (1996). The Directory of British Tramways. Patrick Stephens. ISBN 978-1-85260-549-0.
