= Kinver Light Railway =

Railway in South Staffordshire, England (1901-1930)

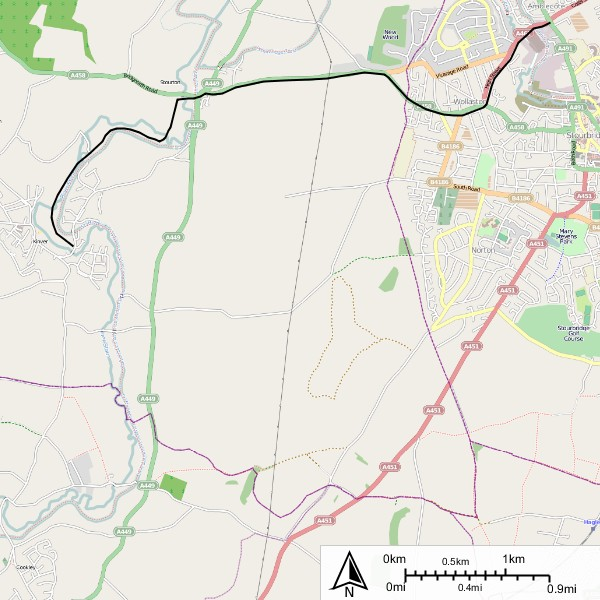
- Map of the Kinver Light Railway

Operation
- Locale: Kinver, Amblecote
- Open: 4 April 1901
- Close: 1 March 1930
- Status: Closed

Infrastructure
- Track gauge: 3 ft 6 in (1,067 mm)
- Propulsion system: Electric
- Depots: Hyde Meadow, Kinver

Statistics
- Route length: 4.19 miles (6.74 km)

The Kinver Light Railway operated a passenger and freight tramway service between Amblecote and Kinver, in South Staffordshire, between 1901 and 1930.

== History ==
The Kinver Light Railway was a subsidiary of British Electric Traction. They acquired the Dudley and Stourbridge Steam Tramways Company in April 1898 and applied to the Light Railway Commissioners (in preference to the Tramways Act 1870 (33 & 34 Vict. c. 78)) for permission to build a tramway from Amblecote to Kinver. The proposal was given the go ahead in the Kinver Light Railway Order 1898 on 7 March 1899.

The tramway was a single track of 3 ft 6 in (1,067 mm) gauge with passing places. The route ran hourly and half-hourly from outside the Fish Inn at Amblecote where it had a connection with the Dudley, Stourbridge and District Electric Traction Company tracks. After passing through Wollaston and Stourton, it arrived in Kinver. From Amblecote to Wollaston Ridge it ran on the streets using conventional grooved rail. From there the line used Vignoles rail (non-grooved bullhead rail). The use of Vignoles rail in conjunction with the tramway's tight curves led to the Board of Trade Inspector imposing a 10 mph speed limit and recommending the use of single-deck tram cars only, while the lack of signalling at passing loops prevented operation at night.

Passenger services started on 4 April 1901. The fare was one penny for each of its four stages and a whole line fare of three pence. The company was taken over by the Dudley, Stourbridge and District Electric Traction Company in 1902 for the sum of £60,000 (equivalent to £6,380,000 in 2025). On 13 December 1902 a single track branch line was laid along Enville street to connect Wollaston to Stourbridge. A shuttle service was operated to the original line at Wollaston Junction, and by 1904 some cars ran through to The Ridge at the western end of the village. Although parcels had been carried on passenger services from the outset, goods trailer vehicles were attached behind service cars for freight from September 1903. The company made significant money from this operation. Substantial quantities of milk were carried, such that occasionally passenger vehicles were commandeered for freight use.

The Sheffield Photo Company produced a film in 1904 entitled A Ride on the Kinver Light Railway. It was directed by Frank Mottershaw, a pioneer film maker.

Passenger numbers began to decline in the mid-1920s as other connecting tramlines originating in the Black Country closed. The Enville Street line between Stourbridge and Wollaston closed on 16 November 1926 and service frequency on the original line was much reduced. Services finished on 8 February 1930, a victim of competition from motorbus traffic, and the final closure took place on 1 March 1930. Almost nothing remains of the tramlines except an outline of where the line was from bird's-eye view, and a few pieces of discarded rail in the more wooded areas of the line.

== See also ==
- Kidderminster and Stourport Electric Tramway Company (1898–1929) another contemporary local route operated by British Electric Traction group
