= Sand Hutton Miniature Railway =

Former railway in North Yorkshire, England

Coordinates: 54.015°N 0.937°W

Overview
- Headquarters: Sand Hutton
- Locale: England
- Dates of operation: 1912–1922
- Successor: Sand Hutton Light Railway

Technical
- Track gauge: 15 in (381 mm)
- Length: 1.207 miles (1.942 km)

The Sand Hutton Miniature Railway was a miniature gauge estate railway serving the estate of Sir Robert Walker, the Fourth Baronet of Sand Hutton, Yorkshire, England.

== History ==
Walker began experimenting with a 15 in (381 mm) gauge miniature railway in 1910. In 1912 he decided to build a miniature railway of that gauge in the grounds of Sand Hutton hall. By the end of the year, 350 yards of track had been laid and the locomotive Synolda had been acquired. By the end of 1913 the railway had been extended to 1,245 yards (1,138 m), and was extended again by 1/2 mile (805 m) in 1914.

At the outbreak of the First World War in 1914, the railway went into hiatus. Most of the local men joined the war effort and the Hall and grounds largely closed. After the war, Walker returned to the Hall and re-opened it. He planned to extend the miniature railway to connect with the nearby North Eastern Railway station at Warthill, a total distance of 7 1/4 miles (11.7 km). This longer line was intended to serve as the main transportation system for the estate. A light railway order was applied for and granted, in January 1920.

Work on the extension started in May 1920 with the trackbed being constructed near Warthill station. By the end of the year the trackbed was complete as far as Sand Hutton, and work was underway on the 3-mile (4.8 km) long branch to the brickworks at Claxton. However much of the new line was steeply graded and it became obvious that a miniature locomotive like Synolda would not be capable of working the new line efficiently. Walker began searching for a more powerful solution to his transportation needs.

In December 1920 the Government announced the sale of the equipment from the 18 in (457 mm) gauge railway at the Deptford Meat Depot. This included track and rolling stock of a much more substantial nature. Walker purchased most of the Deptford equipment and set about converting the miniature railway into the Sand Hutton Light Railway. By 1922 the last remains of the miniature railway were gone and the remaining rolling stock was up for sale.

== Rolling stock ==
Name	Builder	Builder's type	Whyte Type	Built	Notes
Synolda	Bassett-Lowke	Class 30	4-4-2	1912	Named after Sir Robert's first wife. Originally built for the Miniature Railway Company of Great Britain. She was sold to Belle Vue Miniature Railway around 1925. Now preserved at the Ravenglass and Eskdale Railway.

The railway used four 4-wheel open carriages built by Basset-Lowke, each seating up to eight passengers. Walker also had two vehicles built at Sand Hutton: a closed bogie salon carriage and a 4-wheel closed brake van. The salon carriage survived the line and passed to the Ravenglass and Eskdale Railway.
