= Nelson power station =

Former power station in England

- Country: England
- Location: Nelson, Lancashire
- Coordinates: 53°50′48″N 02°12′28″W
- Status: Decommissioned and demolished
- Construction began: 1890
- Commission date: 1892
- Decommission date: 1960
- Owners: Nelson Corporation (1883–1948); British Electricity Authority (1948–1955); Central Electricity Authority (1955–1957); Central Electricity Generating Board (1958–1960)
- Operator: As owner

Thermal power station
- Primary fuel: Coal
- Turbine technology: Steam turbines
- Cooling source: Canal water

Power generation
- Units operational: 1 × 3 MW, 1 × 3.3 MW, 1 × 6.45 MW
- Make and model: Brush-Ljungstrom
- Nameplate capacity: 12.75 MW
- Annual net output: 8,079 MWh (1946)

Nelson power station supplied electricity to the town of Nelson, Lancashire and the surrounding area from 1892 to 1960. The power station was owned and operated by Nelson Corporation prior to the nationalisation of the British electricity supply industry in 1948. It was redeveloped in 1922 to 1925 to meet the increased demand for electricity.

== History ==
In 1883 Nelson Corporation applied for a provisional order under the Electric Lighting Acts to generate and supply electricity to the town. The Nelson Electric Lighting Order 1883 was granted by the Board of Trade and was confirmed by Parliament through the Electric Lighting Orders Confirmation (No. 4) Act 1883 (46 & 47 Vict. c. ccxvi). The power station was built in Charles Street, Nelson (53°50′48″N 2°12′28″W) and it first supplied electricity in 1892. Further equipment was added to meet the rising demand for electricity; by the 1920s it had a generating capacity of 6,400 kW.

In 1900 a system was inaugurated by Nelson Corporation to generate electricity from domestic refuse.

From the system's establishment in February 1903 the power station supplied electric current to Nelson Corporation Tramways. The tram system was decommissioned in January 1934.

Nelson Corporation charged more for electricity than any other electricity undertaking in the North West. In 1913 Nelson Corporation charged 2.42 d./kWh, compared to Manchester Corporation which charge 1.02 d./kWh.

In 1928 Nelson power station became a 'selected' station in the North West England and North Wales Electricity Scheme. The Central Electricity Board imposed restrictions on the working and use of the station.

The British electricity supply industry was nationalised in 1948 under the provisions of the Electricity Act 1947 (10 & 11 Geo. 6. c. 54). The Nelson electricity undertaking was abolished, ownership of Nelson power station was vested in the British Electricity Authority, and subsequently the Central Electricity Authority and the Central Electricity Generating Board (CEGB). At the same time the electricity distribution and sales responsibilities of the Nelson electricity undertaking were transferred to the North Western Electricity Board (NORWEB).

Nelson power station was decommissioned in about 1960. There is a 132 kV electricity sub-station on the site.

== Equipment specification ==
In 1895 the plant comprised Willans engines coupled directly to Holmes and Siemens dynamos. The plant had a maximum load of 89 kW.

By 1922 the plant comprised boilers delivering 75,000 lb/h (9.44 kg/s) of steam to:

- 2 × 3,000 kW steam turbo-alternators AC
- 1 × 400 kW reciprocating engine with DC generator

These machines gave a total generating capacity of 6,400 kW comprising 6,000 kW of alternating current (AC) plus 400 kW of direct current (DC).

Electricity supplies available to consumers were:

- 400 & 230 Volts, 3-phase, 50 Hz AC
- 460 & 230 Volts DC
- 300 V DC Traction current

=== Plant in 1922–25 ===
New plant was commissioned in 1922 to 1925. This comprised:

- Boilers:
  - 3 × Babcock & Wilcox 13,000 lb/h (1.64 kg/s) water tube boilers, steam conditions were 200 psi and 600 °F (13.8 bar, 315 °C)
  - 1 × Babcock & Wilcox 20,000 lb/h (2.52 kg/s) water tube boiler, steam conditions as above,
  - There was therefore a total steam raising capability of 59,000 lb/h (7.43 kg/s), steam was supplied to:
- Generators:
  - 1 × 3 MW Brush-Ljungstrom turbo-alternator
  - 1 × 3.3 MW Brush-Ljungstrom turbo-alternator
  - 1 × 6.45 MW Brush-Ljungstrom turbo-alternator

The total generating capacity was 12.75 MW at 6.6 kV.

Condenser cooling water was drawn from the nearby Leeds and Liverpool canal.

== Operations ==
=== Operating data 1898 ===
Electricity sold: to consumers 68,768 kWh.

No. of lamps on circuits: 5,108

Revenue from sales of electricity was £1,345; the cost of generation was £324.

=== Operating data 1921–23 ===
The electricity supply data for the period 1921–23 was:

Nelson power station supply data 1921–23
Electricity Use	Units	Year		
Electricity Use	Units	1921	1922	1923
Lighting and domestic	MWh	591.8	725.4	790.0
Public lighting	MWh	0	0	0
Traction	MWh	302.2	62.1	554.0
Power	MWh	639.6	627.7	1,111.6
Bulk supply	MWh	108.2	106.5	1,484.9
Total use	MWh	1,641.8	1,521.8	3,940.5

Electricity Loads on the system were:

Year		1921	1922	1923
Maximum load	kW	826	980	2,800
Total connections	kW	5,200	5,713	5,975
Load factor	Per cent	25.3	20.0	22.9

Revenue from sales of current (in 1923) was £44,060; the surplus of revenue over expenses (1923) was £22,737.

=== Operating data 1946 ===
In 1946 Nelson power station supplied 8,079 MWh of electricity, the maximum output load was 6,600 MW.

=== Operating data 1954–58 ===
Operating data for the period 1954–58 was:

Nelson power station operating data, 1954–58
Year	Running hours or load factor (per cent)	Max output capacity MW	Electricity supplied MWh	Thermal efficiency per cent
1954	763	6	2,795	11.29
1955	581	6	2,173	10.54
1956	277	5	955	9.57
1957	497	4	1,441	9.18
1958	136	4	222	4.22

== See also ==
- Timeline of the UK electricity supply industry
- List of power stations in England
