= North Staffordshire Tramways Company =

Tramway operator in England

North Staffordshire Tramways

Operation
- Locale: Staffordshire Potteries
- Open: 22 April 1881
- Close: 27 June 1898
- Status: Closed

Infrastructure
- Track gauge: 4 ft (1,219 mm)
- Propulsion system: Steam

Statistics
- Route length: 5.75 miles (9.25 km)

The North Staffordshire Tramways operated a steam tramway service from 1881 to 1898 in the Staffordshire Potteries area.

== History ==
The North Staffordshire Tramways Company Limited was formed on 4 December 1878. The Stoke-upon-Trent, Fenton, Longton and District Tramways Order 1879 was confirmed by the Tramways Order Confirmation Act 1879 of 11 August 1879 and sanctioned the building of four tramway routes. The company acquired the assets of the Staffordshire Potteries Street Railway Company on 2 March 1880 and continued to operate it between Hanley and Burslem until it rebuilt it in 1882.

The North Staffordshire Tramways Order 1880, confirmed by the Tramways Order Confirmation (No. 2) Act 1880 (43 & 44 Vict. c. clxxiii), sanctioned the building of five additional routes. Both acts of Parliament sanctioned the use of steam engines, and this was the company's selected method of motive power.

The first routes to be constructed ran from the centre of Stoke-upon-Trent to Longton Market Place via Fenton, with branches along Longton High Street and Trentham Road. These were inspected by Major General Charles Scrope Hutchinson of the Board of Trade on 4 January 1881. However some issues must have been found as it required a further inspection which happened on 22 April 1881. The company did not have authority under the act of Parliament to operate steam engines on the branch lines and the approved Longton terminus of the Stoke route at Bank House was not even at the Market Place.

The company was also in dispute with the North Staffordshire Railway Company in relation to the rebuilding of canal bridges in Hanley and Stoke. The tramway company had provided the girders, but an impasse was reached. It was only with the intervention of Major General Charles Scrope Hutchinson in August 1881 who found in favour of the tramway company that the deadlock was broken.

The line from Stoke to Hanley was inspected by Major-General Hutchinson of the Board of Trade on 19 December 1881 and opened for public service on 21 December 1881. It closed a few days later for work required at Hanley, and opened again at the end of January 1882.

From Hanley to Burslem the change of gauge from 1,435 mm (4 ft 8 1/2 in) standard gauge to 4 ft (1,219 mm) meant that for a short while in 1882 the horse tram line ran at the side of the road whilst the steam tram line was in the middle of the road waiting for Board of Trade sanction. Horse drawn tramcars were replaced by steam around June 1882.

The company obtained a number of steam engines by Merryweather and also Manning Wardle. However, these proved to heavy for the rails, weighing in around 13 to 15 tons each. They were also costly to operate at around 14d per mile, with a daily working of 67½ miles per engine. At the company's annual meeting for the 31 December 1882, the shareholders agreed to obtain 15 Wilkinson type engines which weighed in at 8 tons with an operating cost of 8d per mile.

By 1892 the company was running over 5¾ route miles comprising one main route from Longton-Fenton-Stoke-Hanley-Burslem with a one-mile cross-town route in Stoke.

== Fleet ==
The original list of locomotives is recorded by H.A. Whitcombe.

No	Date	Manufacturer	Notes
1-2	1880	Manning, Wardle and Co, Leeds	
3-4	1881	Merryweather & Sons, London	
5	1881	Beyer, Peacock and Company, Manchester	Combined steam car
6-9	1881	Manning, Wardle and Co, Leeds	
10-11	1882	Merryweather & Sons, London	
12-13	1882	Manning, Wardle and Co, Leeds	

== Closure ==
In 1895 the licence to operate steam engines expired, and the Board of Trade inspection recommended conversion to another method of propulsion. The Potteries Electric Traction Company was formed by British Electric Traction to take over the assets of the North Staffordshire Tramways Company. The company was acquired on 27 June 1898 and conversion to overhead electric followed shortly afterwards.

== Sources ==
- Dibdin, H.G. (1959). "Tramways in the Potteries and North Staffordshire". The Tramway Review. 4 (26).
