= Avonmouth Light Railway =

Railway company in Bristol, England

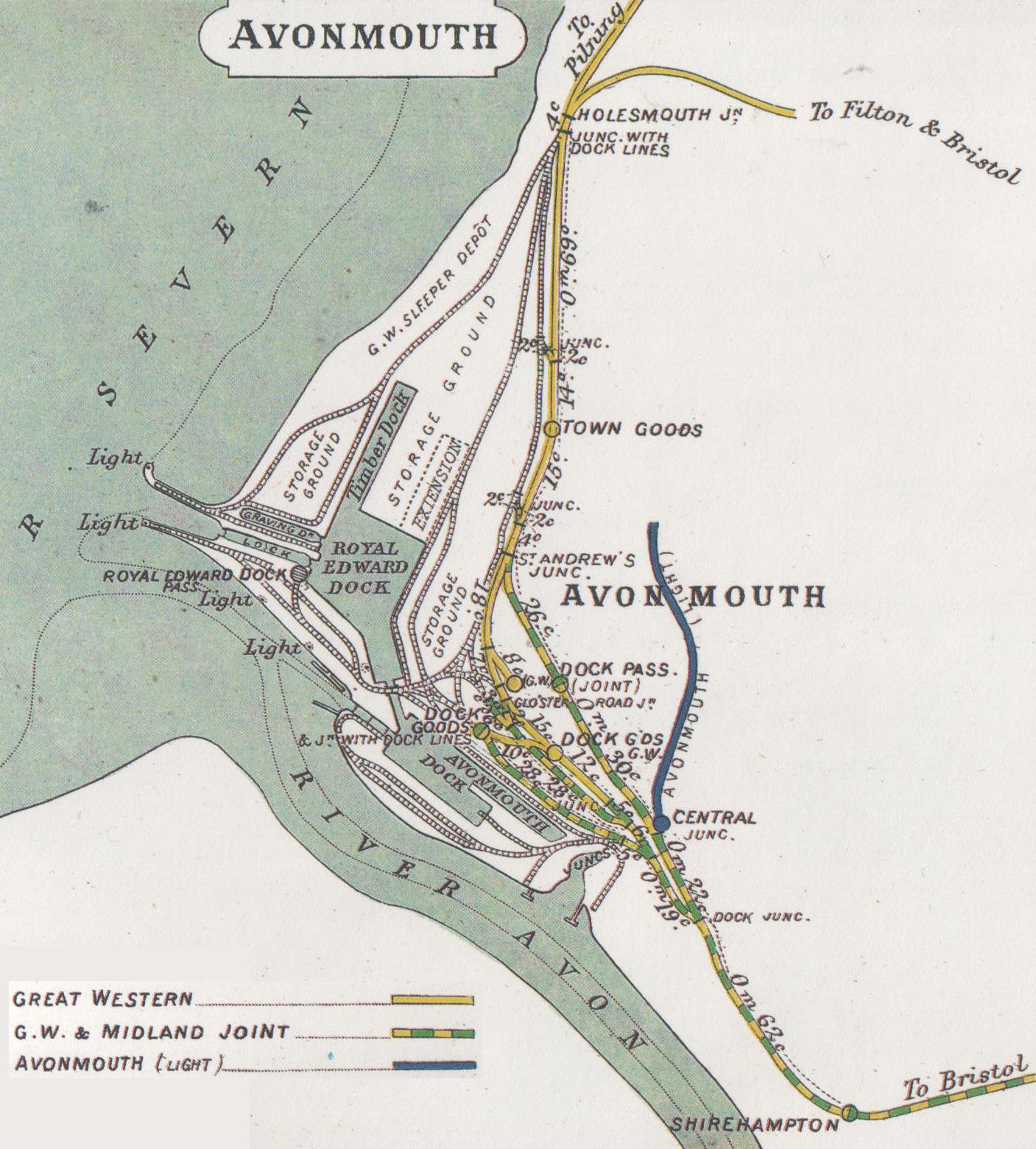
Railways around Avonmouth in 1914. Avonmouth Light Railway in blue

The Avonmouth Light Railway (ALR) was a nominally independent railway company operating a short standard-gauge branch line from a point on what is now the Severn Beach Line near Avonmouth Docks station in Bristol to a Bristol Corporation electricity installation east of the main entrance to Avonmouth Docks. Its promoters had aspirations which were never fulfilled.

== History ==
The ALR was a project of the Kingsweston estate owned by the squire of Kingsweston, Dr Philip Napier Miles, and its headquarters were in the Kingsweston estate office in High Street, Shirehampton. This estate had owned much of the land in the area; Dr Miles' father, Philip William Skynner Miles MP, had been responsible for promoting Avonmouth Docks, opened in 1877 on a large tract of his marshland.

=== Authorisation ===
The plan for the line was deposited in November 1902, and the Avonmouth Light Railway Order 1903 authorising its construction was obtained under the Light Railways Act 1896 (59 & 60 Vict. c. 48); but with the task threatening not to be completed before the period specified in the act expired, renewal was sought several times and obtained from 1909 to 1912, finally through the Avonmouth Light Railway (Revival and Extension of Time) Order 1912, again under the Light Railways Act 1896. The line was nevertheless not completed to the full original specification.

=== Relation to other railway systems ===
The ALR was planned to meet up with other industrial railways developing to serve enterprises further north in the Avonmouth area, but the intended contact never took place. The book of reference of the line specifies that it was to run from Shirehampton (of which Avonmouth was a part at the time) to Henbury, but it never crossed the parish boundary into Henbury.

== Construction ==
The ALR's consulting engineers were Kirkland and Capper of Westminster.

== Operation ==
The line eventually opened in 1908, probably on 1 April, and was closed on an unknown date but probably about 1931.

The line was operated from the start by the Great Western and Midland Joint Railway Committee and transferred by the London Midland and Scottish and Great Western Companies (Avonmouth Light Railway Transfer and Amendment) Order 1927 (SR&O 1927/388) to the ownership of the joint committee's successor companies, the London, Midland and Scottish Railway and the (post-Grouping) Great Western Railway.

The ALR never carried paying passengers, and must have been intended solely to transport coal from the joint committee's sidings to the electricity installation, if this was indeed a generating station.

Little is known about the locomotives and rolling stock, operational history or personnel of the line. There are occasional mentions of it in oral history memoirs, but nothing that illuminates its business with precision. It appears that the Great Western Railway kept an engine in a shed by Portview Road to share the duties of servicing a coal yard and taking trucks along the ALR. It was distinguished by the fact that 100% of its staff were called up in the First World War – that is, both of them.

=== Route ===
The line started from a Bristol-facing junction with sidings on the Clifton Extension Railway (which ran from Narroways Hill Junction and Kingswood Junction in north Bristol to the port of Avonmouth). This junction was located 30 chains (600 m) east of Avonmouth Docks joint station. The stub of the line at its southern end appears as a siding on an Ordnance Survey map of 1949. It crossed several streets on the level in the expanding suburb before setting out across the fields of Avonmouth farm in the direction of a facility variously described as a Bristol Corporation electricity sub-station and as a generating station, and terminating on the western side of this facility in what is now a widened St Andrew's Road. It was about 58 chains (1,200 m) long. There is some doubt about whether it was ever extended further. Almost no trace of the line remains in 2015. Gaps between buildings in Portview Road, Davis Street and Avonmouth Road could be discerned by the knowledgeable and interpreted as the course of the line, but building has taken place in some gaps, and the only ones remaining are on both sides of Davis Street (west of numbers 28 and 31) and opposite the Miles Arms hotel in Avonmouth Road. The fields north of the village across which it went have all been built over with warehousing and other commercial development as Avonmouth has expanded, but the disturbed ground marking its course can clearly be followed in post-WW2 aerial photography, cutting across fields still showing the ridge-and-furrow pattern of pre-modern arable farming. The electricity station or sub-station which was its destination is still in existence but derelict.
