= Kidderminster and Stourport Electric Tramway Company =

Tramway operator in England

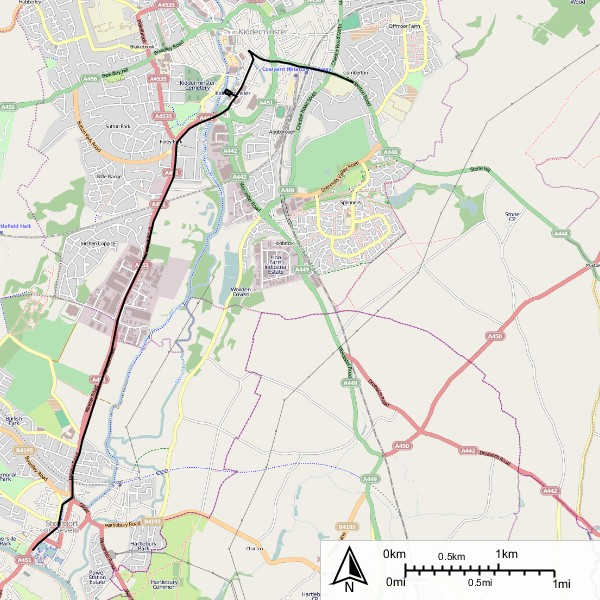
- Map of the Kidderminster and Stourport Electric Tramway

Operation
- Locale: Kidderminster, Stourport-on-Severn
- Open: 28 May 1898
- Close: 2 April 1929
- Status: Closed

Infrastructure
- Track gauge: 3 ft 6 in (1,067 mm)
- Propulsion system: Electric

Statistics
- Route length: 4.6 miles (7.4 km)

The Kidderminster and Stourport Electric Tramway Company operated an electric tramway service between Kidderminster and Stourport-on-Severn between 1898 and 1929.

== History ==
The tramway was authorised by the Kidderminster and Stourport Electric Tramway Act 1896. The company was established as a subsidiary of the British Electric Traction group.

A Kidderminster company George Law was responsible for the construction at a cost of £23,314 (equivalent to £2,620,000 in 2025). The depot and generating station were constructed off New Road, Kidderminster; a single track laid along two routes; and four bridges were widened.

The system was notable at the start for having vestibuled cars with windscreens to protect the driver, whereas most other systems, the driver was exposed to the elements.

== Closure ==
The system closed on 2 April 1929.

== See also ==
- Kinver Light Railway (1901–1930) another contemporary local route operated by British Electric Traction group
