= Middleton Electric Traction Company =

Defunct tramway service company

The Middleton Electric Traction Company Ltd. operated an electric tramway service in Middleton, England between 1902 and 1925. It was a subsidiary company of the British Electric Traction group.

== History ==
Powers to build were obtained under the Middleton Light Railways Order 1898 and the Middleton Light Railways (Deviation, &c.) Order 1902, for 8 miles 1397 yards of light railways. Building of the lines commenced in March 1900 and was completed by 1902 when the official inspection took place on 10 March. Track miles as built totalled 8 miles 1005 yards (the discrepancy between the lines as-built and the original light railways order being: a portion of line within Oldham Borough which Oldham built to its own standards as per a clause within the original order). Standard gauge (4 foot 8.5 inches) was used throughout. Power for the lines was supplied by Middleton Corporation from its electricity works in Townley Street, Middleton.

=== The routes as built ===
The lines as built constituted the two routes operated by the company. The first route – described on running boards and fare tables as "Rhodes and Oldham" – running from Rhodes, a village south-west of Middleton via Middleton Town Centre to the Chadderton boundary with Oldham, east of Middleton. At Rhodes, the trams met those of Salford Corporation who ran a service from Rhodes to Eccles from 1902 until 1925. The lines were not connected – indeed there was a 50-yard gap.

The second route running from Middleton town centre to Sudden (approximately one mile from the centre of Rochdale). The route from Middleton to Sudden was built by G. Freeman and Sons contractors at a price of £38,781 (about £12m in 2016). At Sudden, the trams met those of Rochdale Corporation on the Heywood service. Again, the lines were not connected and there was no through running.

In April 1923, Middleton, Chadderton and Rochdale councils decided to appoint J. B. Hamilton (the then manager of Leeds Corporation Tramways) as technical adviser and Arthur Collins as financial adviser to conduct a feasibility study as to the purchase of the company's system.

== Fleet ==
The fleet was housed at the company depot situated on Hilton Fold Lane, Middleton. Throughout its existence, the company owned a total of 38 tramway vehicles. From May 1920, the company also owned four chars-a-banc and three motor buses. Although most of the tramway fleet was single-deck owing to the presence of a low bridge at Mills Hill, single-deck tramway vehicles ran on both of the company's lines. Open top double-deck trams ran on the Middleton to Sudden section only.

=== Electric tramcars ===
Cars 1 – 10 single-deck combination cars built 1901 – 44 seats

Cars 11 – 20 single-deck combination cars built 1901 – 42 seats – sold in 1904-5 (four to Oldham Ashton and Hyde Company and six to Swansea Tramways and Improvements Co.)

Cars 22 – 25 single-deck combination cars built 1902 – 40 seats – sold in 1907 to the Potteries Electric Traction Company

Cars 27 – 34 single-deck built 1899 – 28 seats – originally trailers for the Oldham Ashton and Hyde Electric Tramways Ltd; purchased and motorised by Middleton in 1903

Cars 11 – 15 Double deck open top built 1903 – 48 (22/26) seats

Car 21 – Water car and snow plough built 1901

=== Motor vehicles ===
Four chars-a-banc - 28 seats

Motor bus – AEC chassis – Tylor Engine – registration BU 1412 – to Manchester Corporation; converted to lorry 1926

Motor bus – AEC chassis – Tylor engine – registration BU 1413 – to Manchester Corporation; converted to lorry 1926

Motor bus – Daimler chassis and engine – registration HO 5506 – to Manchester Corporation; converted to lorry 1927, scrapped 1936

=== Ancillaries ===
Overhead tower wagon – horse-drawn by company horse, Merriman

== Purchase by Middleton, Chadderton and Rochdale councils; lease to Manchester Corporation ==
The Middleton Electric Traction Company was purchased by the councils of Middleton, Rochdale and Chadderton in 1925. The purchase price was set at £79,000 (£4.1m in 2016) and was completed at the London headquarters of the British Electric Traction Company on 15/06/1925. Middleton paid £40,835 (£2.12m in 2016); Chadderton paid £27,690 (£1.4m in 2016); Rochdale paid £10,475 (£0.54m in 2016). Oldham Corporation purchased the Chadderton council's share of the undertaking for £27,690 (£1.4m in 2016) on 16/06/1925. Manchester Corporation took a 30 years lease from Middleton Corporation from the date of purchase by Middleton Corporation. This lease included an undertaking to run all services, re-lay and re-set all permanent way and overhead as appropriate.

== Track reconstruction and dispersal of vehicles ==
The lines at Rhodes and at Middleton Fountain were connected end-on during the next two months. Between April and July 1925, the tracks at Sudden (at a position in Manchester Road west of Silk Street) were reconstructed and connected to the Rochdale Corporation system by Rochdale Corporation at a cost of £2,519 (c. £128,300 in 2016). Similarly, Oldham Corporation joined the two systems together at the municipal boundary between Chadderton and Oldham (approximately 25 yards east of Lansdowne Road). Manchester Corporation bought the buses for £250 (approx £12,700 in 2016) each. The water car and snow plough (number 21) was sold to the South Lancashire Tramways Company for £40. The depot at Hilton Fold Lane was retained by Middleton Corporation, eventually demolished and houses were built on the site.

== Extensions by Manchester Corporation; joint operation of services; Rochdale, Salford and Bury ==
From January 1926, the track from Rhodes (Junction of Heywood Old Road and Manchester Old Road) to Hollin Lane was relaid and doubled. In 1927 a double track connection was provided at the connection of Manchester New Road and Long Street, Middleton. The 17 route to Rochdale was also relaid as double track. However, both north of Middleton (beyond Vincent Street and as far as Gipsy Lane, Castleton) and the Mills Hill route in its entirety remained single track with passing loops. Manchester New Road lines were connected to Manchester Old Road lines by means of a new double track in Mill Street. The Mill Street track also incorporated a crossover for the 17A trams to return to Manchester.

In 1928, a new line was opened to Heywood by means of a junction with the Rochdale route at Hollin Lane/Rochdale Road, Middleton. The new route was allocated the number 18 and service commenced 19 May 1928. Journey time to Manchester was 49 minutes. As both Bury and Rochdale corporations operated the Heywood Corporation tramways, this route was run as a joint service with Bury Corporation although its participation was restricted to only one tram, usually car 30, fitted with high speed motors and air brakes.

== Routes with opening and closing dates ==
=== Middleton Electric Traction Company ===
Middleton (Fountain) to Sudden - 28/03/1902 - taken over 15/06/1925 by Middleton and Rochdale Corporations

Rhodes to Oldham - 27/03/1902 - taken over 15/06/1925 by Middleton Corporation and Chadderton Urban District Council

Middleton (via Hopwood) - Heywood (St. Luke's Church) - 25/03/1920 - taken over by Manchester Corporation (Motor bus service)

==== Manchester Corporation Tramways ====
Manchester (High Street) to Middleton - 24/12/1902 (from 1914, route number 17); from 09/08/1925, route number 17A; closed 24/03/1935

Manchester (High Street) to Rochdale (Esplanade) - 09/08/1925 (route number 17) - closed 13/11/1932

Manchester (High Street) to Heywood - 19/05/1928 (route number 18) - closed 02/05/1934

Manchester (Albert Square) to Mills Hill Bridge (route number 59) - 24/03/1930 - closed 20/03/1932

Middleton (Fountain) to Middleton Junction (from 1914, route number 16) - 31/03/1903 - closed 31/03/1935

===== Oldham Corporation Tramways =====
Oldham (Market Place) - Middleton (Market Place) - 09/08/1925 (route number 3) - 11/06/1935

===== Rochdale Corporation Tramways =====
Rochdale (Esplanade) to Manchester (High Street) - 09/08/1925 - closed 13/11/1932

====== Salford Corporation Tramways ======
Victoria Bridge (Salford) - Middleton (various termini) - 09/08/1925 (route number 77) - closed 20/03/1932

All services were replaced by buses, run by Manchester, Rochdale, Salford and Oldham Corporations.

== Summary of closure of the Middleton Tramways; general conclusions ==
The closure of the Middleton tramways was a complicated and protracted affair which took place in stages over three years.

- The through service to Rochdale ended on 13 November 1932 and the section of track from Hollin Lane to the Rochdale boundary was abandoned from this date.
- Although the main services along Manchester Old Road to Manchester (59) and Salford (77) had already ceased in 1932, Manchester provided short workings between Mills Hill and Rhodes until March 1933. Accordingly, the Rhodes section along Manchester Old Road closed on 27 March 1933.
- The through service to Heywood ended on 2 May 1934. The track was lifted along Hollin Lane, Middleton and was sold to Stockport Corporation who used it to re-lay their route to Edgeley.
- The final Manchester Corporation routes to Middleton closed on 24 March 1935; from that date, trams ceased to run along Manchester New Road.
- The final Middleton tramways closure took place on 11 June 1935 with the cessation of trams on the number 3 (Oldham to Middleton) route.

Middleton had been quite unique in the United Kingdom in that it had had its tramways operated and run jointly by five corporations and a private company without ever owning a vehicle of its own.
