= Cheltenham and District Light Railway =

Former rail company in Gloucestershire, England

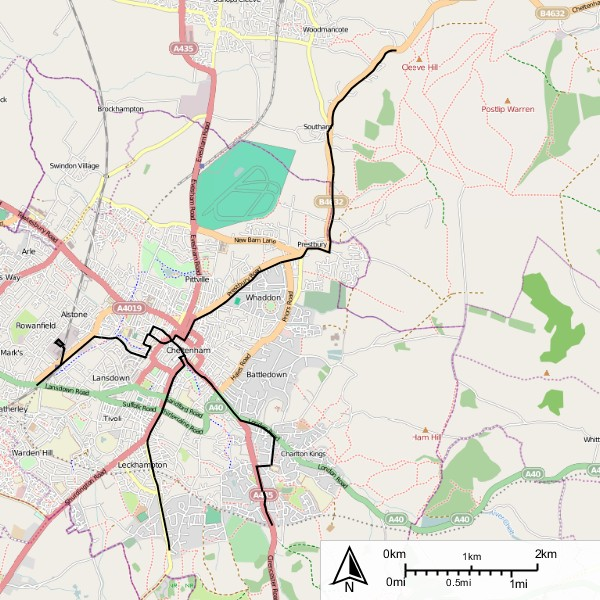
- Map of the Cheltenham and District Light Railway

Operation
- Locale: Cheltenham
- Open: 22 August 1901
- Close: 31 December 1930
- Status: Closed

Infrastructure
- Track gauge: 3 ft 6 in (1,067 mm)
- Propulsion system: Electric

Statistics
- Route length: 10.44 miles (16.80 km)

The Cheltenham and District Light Railway operated an electric tramway service in Cheltenham between 1901 and 1930.

== History ==
Construction began in February 1901 promoted by Nevins and Son. The work of construction involved around 120 men and a steam 'devil' was used to break up the road surface. Track was laid from Lansdown Castle to the south west of Cheltenham along Gloucester Road to the Calcutta Inn, St George's Rd, St. George's Place, St. James’ Square to the Great Western Railway station, Clarence Street, North Street, Albion Street, Winchcombe Street, Prestbury Road then through Prestbury and Southam to the top of Cleeve Hill, a route of 5.5 miles (8.9 km). Electricity was drawn from the Cheltenham Corporation Electricity Department's Manchester Street sub-station.

During construction two employees, Mr. Jackson and Mr. Wells, were killed on a test run when the brakes failed on Cleeve Hill. The initial line on the tramway was inspected by Colonel von Donop R.E on 15 August 1901. Services started on the initial route from Lansdown to Cleeve Hill on 22 August 1901.

The extension works to Charlton Kings and Leckhampton started on 28 September 1904 and were completed in April 1905 when they were inspected by Major J. W. Pringle of the Board of Trade. The construction had involved 1,600 tons of granite setts from Scotland, up to 1,000 tons of rails from Leeds, electrification poles from Wednesbury, 15,500 yards of copper wire and 50 tons of fish-plates, tiebars and bolts. This produced 4.5 route miles of tramway of mixed single and double tracks. Eight new cars were obtained from the British Thomson-Houston Co of Rugby. The extension cost around £60,000,equivalent to £6,307,600 in 2025) of which £5,000 was the eight new tramcars.

The last surviving Cheltenham tram (No 21) is conserved by The Cheltenham Trust but not on public display. It was built by English Electric in Preston in 1921 but withdrawn from service in 1931 when the tram system was abandoned.

Routes were operated from Cheltenham Spa railway station to Cleeve Hill, Prestbury, Charlton Kings and Leckhampton.

The depot was located 300m north of Cheltenham Spa railway station at SO 9327 2239. The site is now occupied by the Stagecoach bus depot.

== Closure ==
As part of a programme of replacing the tramway services with buses, the final trams ran on 31 December 1930.
