= York Corporation Tramways =

Tramway and trolleybus service in York, England

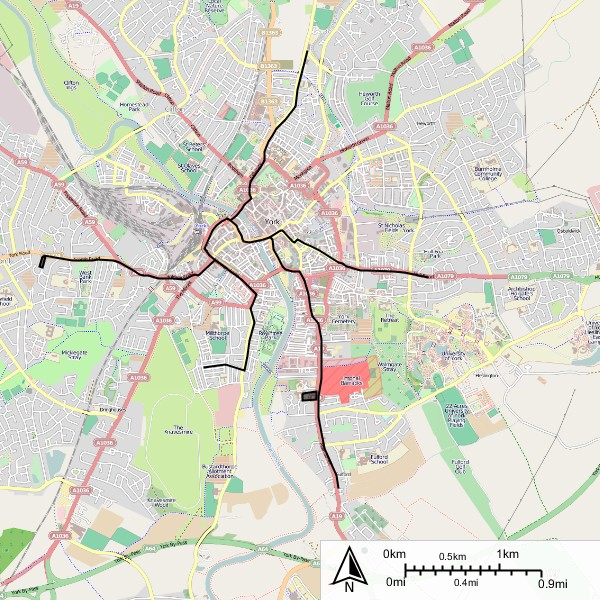
- Map of York Corporation Tramways

Operation
- Locale: York
- Open: 20 January 1910
- Close: 16 November 1935
- Status: Closed
- Routes: 6
- Owner: York-West Yorkshire

Infrastructure
- Track gauge: 3 ft 6 in (1,067 mm)
- Propulsion system: Electric
- Depot: Fulford Cross

Statistics
- Route length: 8.49 miles (13.66 km)

The York Corporation Tramways (YCT) provided an electric tramway and trolleybus service in York between 1910 and 1935.

== Trams ==
=== History ===
In 1909, the City of York Corporation purchased the assets of the York Tramways Company. Initially it took over the operation of the horse-drawn tramway, but put into effect immediate plans for its electrification and extension. The system eventually expanded to six main routes out from the city centre to Acomb, Dringhouses, Fulford, Haxby Road, Hull Road and South Bank. Unlike most other systems in England, it was built to 3 ft 6 in (1,067 mm) gauge.

On 1 April 1934, the network became part of York-West Yorkshire when the YCT merged its operations with those of the West Yorkshire Road Car Company. Following a decision to abandon electric traction, the route to Dringhouses closed on 5 January 1935, the other five on 16 November 1935.

=== Fleet ===
The YCT operated a fleet of 45 trams.

- 1–18 Eighteen cars 1910 from British Thomson-Houston
- 19 Water car 1910 from British Thomson-Houston
- 20–23 Four additional cars 1912 from British Thomson-Houston
- 24–27 Four additional cars 1912 from British Thomson-Houston
- 28–31 Four additional cars 1913 from Brush Traction
- 32–35 Four trailer cars 1914 from Brush Traction
- 36–41 Six additional cars 1915 from Brush Traction

Before 1925, the fleet was renumbered and new cars were delivered:

- 1–26 (Original 1–18 and 20–27)
- 27–30 (Original 28–31)
- 31–36 (Original 36–41)
- 37 English Electric Company 1925 single man operated (damaged in a collision in 1925), converted to a sand and salt carrier
- 37–38 Two cars built by the YCT in 1929 using the trucks from the water car, a set of spare trucks and two of the trailer bodies
- 39–41 Three second-hand cars from the Wolverhampton Corporation Tramways (Wolverhampton numbers 46, 50 and 56)
- 42–45 Four second-hand cars from the Burton upon Trent Corporation Tramways (Burton number 21-24)

== Trolleybuses ==
In 1915 YCT purchased four 24-seat battery buses from the Edison and Swan Electric Light Company on services to Clifton and Heworth. They operated from a small depot on Foss Islands Road. Charging points were located at each of the termini. In December 1920, four Railless trolleybuses replaced them on route 4 from the foot of Parliament Street to Heworth. In 1921 all were transferred to YCT's new Piccadilly depot. All were replaced by motor buses in 1929.

With a view to resuming trolleybus operation, in January 1931 a double-deck Charles H. Roe bodied Karrier was borrowed from Doncaster Corporation for evaluation, but it was deemed that double-deckers were not suitable and thus three 32-seat single deck Charles H. Roe bodied Karrier-Cloughs were purchased, resuming trolleybus operation on route 4 in October 1931.

On 1 April 1934, all passed to the York-West Yorkshire when the YCT merged its operations with those of the West Yorkshire Road Car Company. Following a decision to abandon electric traction, the trolleybuses were withdrawn on 5 January 1935.
