= Potteries Electric Traction Company =

Tramway operator in England

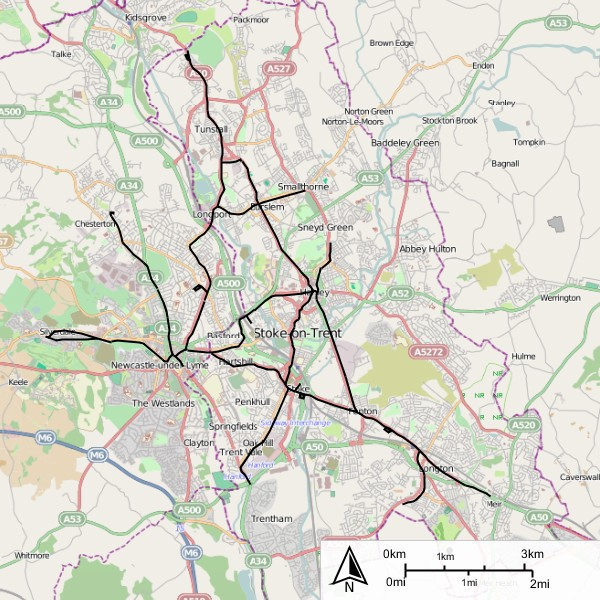
- Map of the routes of the Potteries Electric Traction Company

Operation
- Locale: The Potteries, north Staffordshire
- Open: 16 May 1899
- Close: 11 July 1928
- Status: Closed

Infrastructure
- Track gauge: 4 ft (1,219 mm)
- Propulsion system: Electric
- Depot: see main body for info.

Statistics
- Route length: 32 miles (51 km)

The Potteries Electric Traction Company operated a tramway service in The Potteries between 1899 and 1928.

== History ==
British Electric Traction incorporated a new company on 27 June 1898, called the Potteries Electric Traction Company. Its purpose was to extend the existing tramway through the towns of the Potteries. In payment of £152,410 to British Electric Traction the Potteries Electric Traction Company acquired four separate companies:

- North Staffordshire Tramways Company Limited - 6¾ route miles
- Longton Corporation Tramways - 1½ route miles
- Potteries Extension Tramways - 12 route miles
- Potteries Light Railways - 12 route miles

The contract for construction of 28 miles of permanent way was awarded to Dick, Kerr & Co. and the overhead work was awarded to R. W Blackwell and Company.

A coal-fired power station was constructed by Brush Electrical Engineering Company at the depot at Woodhouse Street, Stoke and opened in 1899. It contained four Lancashire boilers with three Mackintosh & Seymour 330 h.p. compound engines driving three 200 kW dynamos. Later an additional engine drove a fourth dynamo.

In 1902 a second station was opened at Lunt Street, between May Bank and Wolstanton. It housed four Lancashire boilers, four engines coupled to two 200 kW and two 440 kW dynamos, with a 20 kW emergency set.

The 4 ft (1,219 mm) gauge track was laid with 30 feet (9.1 m) lengths weighing 87 lbs per yard paved with stone setts. The steepest gradient was 1 in 8½, and the tightest curve had a radius of 26 feet (7.9 m).

The Board of Trade inspected the newly re-constructed routes on 18 April 1899. The first section from Hanley via Cobridge, Burslem and Tunstall to Goldenhill was opened with due ceremony on 15 May 1899, with regular services commencing on the following day. The remainder of the line from Hanley through Stoke to Longton opened shortly afterwards followed quickly by the Longton to Dresden and Meir.

The steam trams were disposed of with Blackburn Corporation obtaining seven, The Bradford Tramways and Omnibus Company taking four, and the Bradford and Shelf Tramway Company taking one. The tramway trailers were sold for garden sheds.

The construction of the extensions was also underway at this time. On 13 September 1899 the Board of Trade inspected the line from Burslem to Smallthorne, and Burslem to Longport and these were approved for service. Services started as soon as new rolling stock became available. Services to Newcastle were inaugurated on 17 March 1900.

In January 1901 the tram lines from Newcastle to Chesterton and from Newcastle to Silverdale were opened.

By 1902, the company had a fleet of 105 trams and carried 14,438,048 passengers.

Further extensions were completed as follows which brought the total route length to 31 miles 58 chains (51.1 km).:

- Stoke to Newcastle, 23 February 1904
- Hanley to Sneyd Green, November 1905
- Longton to Adderley Green (Sandford Hill), November 1905
- Stoke to Trent Vale, November 1905

== Fleet ==
- 1-17 Brush single deck cars 1898
- 18-27 Brush single deck trailers 1898
- 28-40 Brush single deck cars 1899
- 41-70 Electric Railway and Tramway Carriage Works 1900.
- 71-85 Midland Railway Carriage and Wagon Company 1900.
- 86-106 Brush 1901 (99, 100 and 106 transferred to Barrow in Furness Tramways 1904/05)
- 99-100 Second-hand cars from Middleton Electric Traction Company
- 107 Works car
- 108 Open railway type car
- 109-112 Parcels trailers
- 113-117 Brush 1906
- 118-119 Second hand cars from Middleton Electric Traction Company
- 120
- 121-123 Three second hand cars 1920 from Sheffield Corporation Tramways (Sheffield 58, 122 and 123)
- 124 Modified iron tip wagon 1922.
- 125 Second-hand car from the Dudley, Stourbridge and District Electric Traction Company

== Accidents ==
Trams were relatively safe, although there were accidents.

On 18 February 1924 at 7.30pm car number 122 was approaching Stoke from Newcastle with around 14 passengers when it suffered a failure of the braking system and lost control descending Hartshill bank. When it passed Shelton Old Road it left the lines on a curve and crashed into the wall adjoining some houses. It came to rest in front of St Andrew's Church. It was reported that it was beyond the driver's control for around 300 yards before it left the lines and reached speeds of up to 40 mph.

On 7 March 1924 an accident occurred at 8.45pm at the level-crossing in Waterloo Road, Cobridge, known as the Granvile crossing. A tramcar stopped as the gates were closed, but then crept forwards and collided with a passing goods train. The tram driver, John Steventon of Tunstall, died of his injuries shortly afterwards and the crossing keeper was badly injured.

== Depot ==
As with all tram systems, the PET Company had a number of tram depots located at the end of each line. PET had depots located at Chesterton, Fenton, Goldenhill, Stoke, May Bank.

== Closure ==
The system closed in 1928 with the last tram running on 11 July 1928, and in May 1933 the company was renamed Potteries Motor Traction.

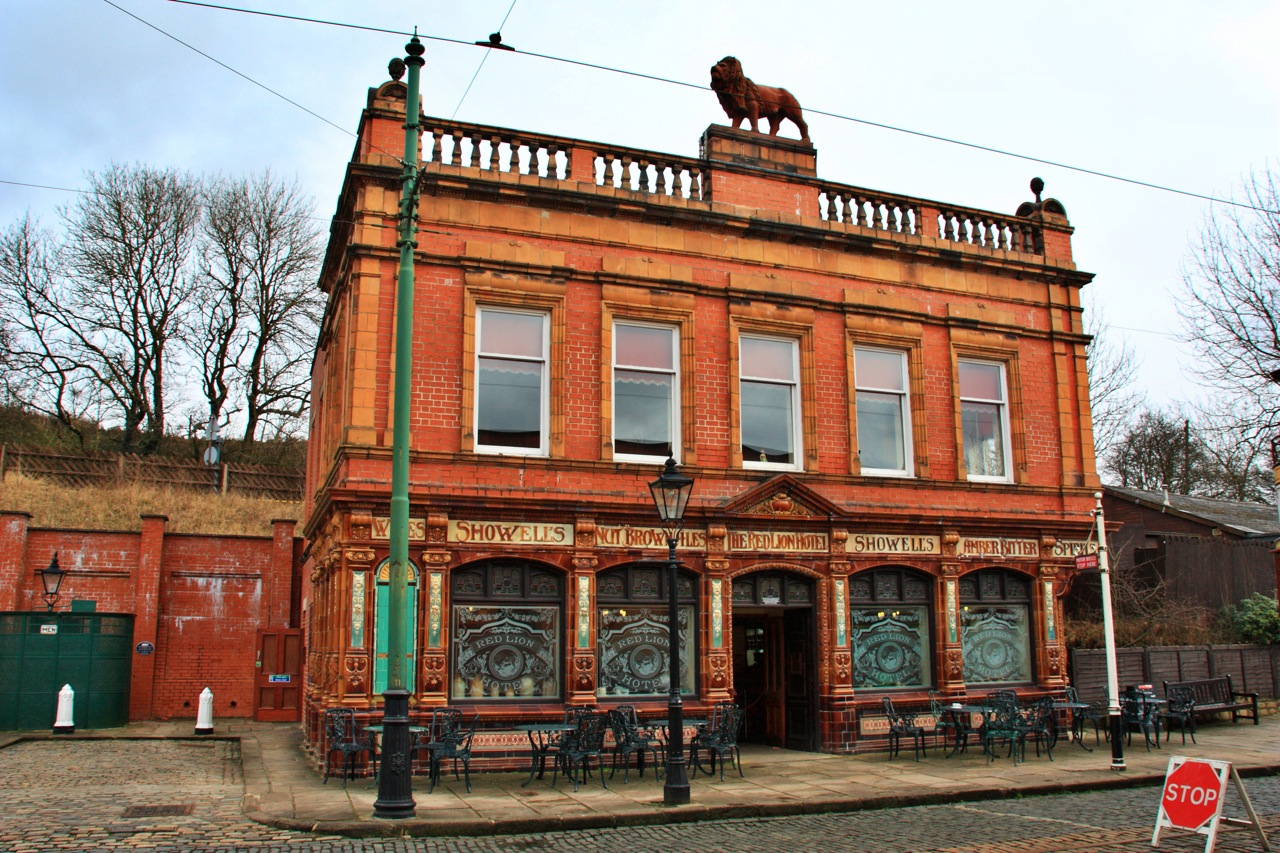
The Red Lion Hotel, National Tramway Museum

The Red Lion public house which for years stood outside the tramway depot in Stoke-on-Trent, is now relocated to the National Tramway Museum.

== Possible reintroduction ==
It has been proposed as part of the Transforming Cities Fund that Stoke-on-Trent could get a tramway once again for the first time in 90 years.

== Sources ==
Works cited

- Dibdin, H.G. (1959). "Tramways in the Potteries and North Staffordshire". The Tramway Review. 4 (26).
- Dibdin, H.G. (1960). "Tramways in the Potteries and North Staffordshire". The Tramway Review. 4 (27).
