= Nelson Corporation Tramways =

Lancashire tramway service

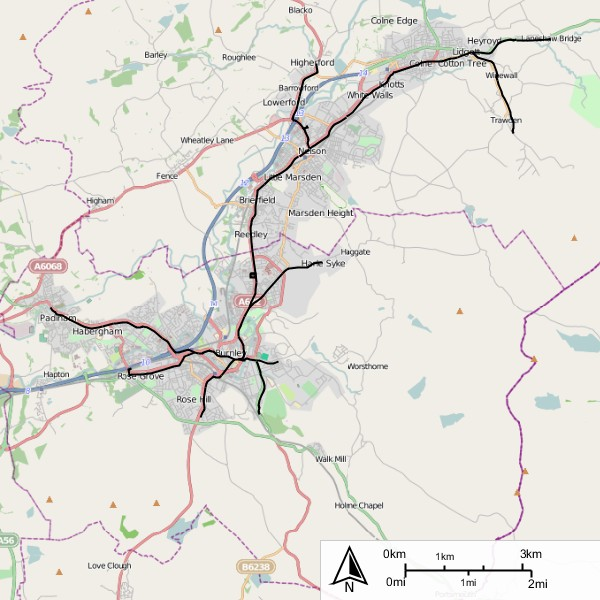
- Map of the tramways of Burnley, Padiham, Nelson and Colne

Operation
- Locale: Nelson, Lancashire
- Open: 23 February 1903
- Close: 6 January 1934
- Status: Closed

Infrastructure
- Track gauge: 4 ft (1,219 mm)
- Propulsion system: Electric
- Depot: Charles Street

Statistics
- Route length: 2.74 miles (4.41 km)

Nelson Corporation Tramways operated a tramway service in Nelson, Lancashire between 1903 and 1934.

== History ==
The tramway was authorised by the Nelson Light Railway Order 1901.

The tramway route ran along the Leeds Road from the town centre to the boundary with Colne (to connect with the Colne and Trawden Light Railway. It also connected with the Burnley Corporation Tramways network. There was also a branch line, from Scotland Road to Higherford Bridge.

Electricity was supplied from Nelson power station.

In 1912, the company obtained two low height tramcars which could pass underneath the low bridge carrying the railway in Colne, and through services to Colne were initiated.

In 1924, the Barrowford section of the tramway was relaid after a proposal to substitute with buses was rejected.

== Fleet ==
The company livery was red and white. Eight vehicles were purchased as follows:

- 1-6 Brush Electrical Machines, Loughborough1903. Double deck trams.
- 7-8 Electric Railway and Tramway Carriage Works, Preston 1903. Single deck trams.
- 9 Electric Railway and Tramway Carriage Works, Preston 1904 Single deck tram.
- 10-11 United Electric Car Company, Preston, 1912. Double deck low height trams.

== Closure ==
The system closed on 6 January 1934.
