= Peterborough Tramways =

Tramway operator in England

Coordinates: 52.5886°N 0.2474°W

Peterborough Electric Traction Company

Operation
- Locale: Peterborough
- Open: 24 January 1903
- Close: 15 November 1930
- Status: Closed

Infrastructure
- Track gauge: 3 ft 6 in (1,067 mm)
- Propulsion system: Electric
- Depots: Lincoln Road, Peterborough

Statistics
- Route length: 5.31 miles (8.55 km)

Peterborough Tramways served the city of Peterborough from 24 January 1903 until 15 November 1930.

== Infrastructure ==
From its southmost limit, the Market Place (grid reference TL 19208 98667), the network had three routes:

- along Westgate and Lincoln Road to a terminus at the junction with Sage's Lane at grid reference TF 17224 02114 (Walton)
- along Westgate, Lincoln Road and Dogsthorpe Road to a terminus at the junction with St Pauls Road at grid reference TF 19186 01249 (Dogsthorpe)
- along Midgate, New Road and Eastfield Road to a terminus at the junction with Eye Road at grid reference TF 20878 00536 (Newark)

The depot was located on the east side of Lincoln Road at grid reference TF 18827 00418. Millfield Bus Depot now occupies the site.

== Tramcars ==
The fleet, in a livery of lake-brown and cream (later holly green and cream), consisted of:

- 14 Brush Electrical Machines open top double deck tramcars

== Closure ==
The system's owners started to introduce motorbuses in 1913 to supplement the trams. Ultimately Peterborough's electric tram system was superseded by a motorbus system which was an original component of the Eastern Counties Omnibus Company.

== See also ==
List of town tramway systems in the United Kingdom
