= Dudley and Stourbridge Steam Tramways Company =

British steam tram company, 1884–1899

Operation
- Locale: Dudley, Stourbridge
- Open: 21 May 1884
- Close: 25 July 1899
- Status: Closed

Infrastructure
- Track gauge: 3 ft 6 in (1,067 mm)
- Propulsion system: Steam

Statistics
- Route length: 5.6 miles (9.0 km)

The Dudley and Stourbridge Steam Tramways Company operated a steam tramway service between Dudley and Stourbridge between 1884 and 1899.

== History ==
The tramway was authorised by the Dudley, Stourbridge and Kingswinford Tramways Order 1881. The line to Kingswinford was not approved.

It opened on 21 May 1884 running from the London and North Western Railway Dudley railway station through Brierley Hill and Amblecote to Stourbridge.

== Fleet ==
Locomotives:

- 1-8 Kitson and Company 1884
- 9 Kitson and Company 1885
- 10 Kitson and Company 1891
- 11 Kitson and Company 1895
- 12 Kitson and Company 1896

Eight passenger vehicles were ordered from the Starbuck Car and Wagon Company in 1884. On closure, five of these were transferred to the Birmingham and Midland Tramways Company.

== Closure ==
The company was purchased by British Electric Traction on 2 April 1898, and converted to electric traction. The last steam tram ran on 25 July 1899 and the operation was taken over by a new company, the Dudley, Stourbridge and District Electric Traction Company.
