= Poole and District Electric Tramways =

Tramway operator in England

Operation
- Locale: Poole
- Open: 6 April 1901; 125 years ago
- Close: 15 June 1905; 121 years ago
- Status: Closed

Infrastructure
- Track gauge: 3 ft 6 in (1,067 mm)
- Propulsion system: Electric
- Depots: Ashley Road, Upper Parkstone

Statistics
- Route length: 3.76 miles (6.05 km)

The Poole and District Electric Tramways operated an electric tramway service in Poole between 1901 and 1905.

== History ==
The Poole and District Electric Traction Company was a subsidiary of British Electric Traction. A single line was built from Poole railway station through Upper Parkstone to County Gates. The fare for the journey was 3d.

The company operated a fleet of 17 tramcars from a depot at Ashley Road in Upper Parkstone.

== Closure ==
The system was bought by Poole Corporation in 1905 and leased for thirty years to Bournemouth Corporation Tramways from June 1905, and this line was subsumed into their system.
