= Walthamstow Urban District Council Light Railways =

UK tramway operator

Coordinates: 51.5937°N 0.0191°W

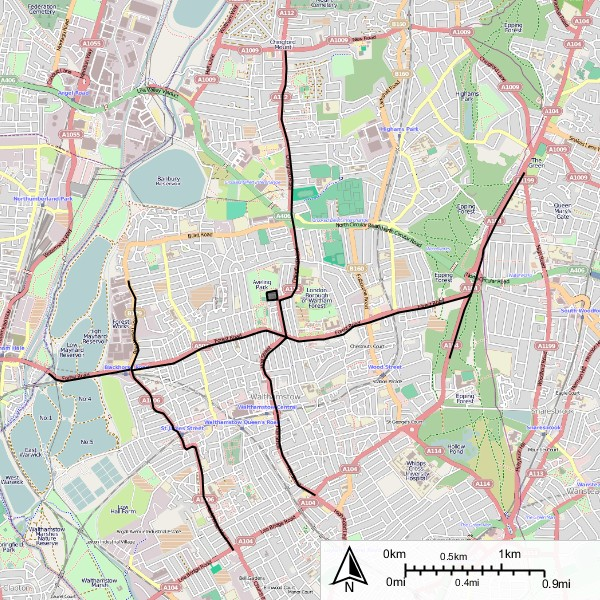
- Map of the routes of Walthamstow Urban District Council Light Railways

Operation
- Locale: Walthamstow
- Open: 3 June 1905
- Close: 1 July 1933
- Status: Closed

Infrastructure
- Track gauge: 1,435 mm (4 ft 8 1/2 in)
- Propulsion system: Electric

Statistics
- Route length: 9.14 miles (14.71 km)

Walthamstow Urban District Council Light Railways operated a tramway service in Walthamstow between 1905 and 1933.

== History ==
The Walthamstow and District Light Railway Order 1903 authorised Walthamstow Urban District Council to start electric tramway services on 3 June 1905. The "and district" referred to the lines beyond the Walthamstow boundary into Chingford, where the terminus was just short of the Prince Albert public house, and Leyton, where the line ended at the Bakers' Arms public house.

The depot and offices were located in Chingford Road at TQ 3731 9018.

The tramways became immortalised in January 1909, in national newspapers. The incident was known as the Walthamstow Tram Chase or Tottenham Outrage. Two Latvian revolutionaries attacked a clerk in Tottenham and stole a large amount of money. Pursued by the police and the public there was shooting and some people were killed. The thieves commandeered a tram towards Highams Park. Both men eventually killed themselves and the money was never found. The incident later became the subject of a silent film.

== Closure ==
The services were taken over by London Passenger Transport Board on 1 July 1933.
