= York Tramways Company =

Tramway operator in England

City of York Tramways Company

Operation
- Locale: York
- Open: April 1881
- Close: 27 February 1909
- Status: Closed

Infrastructure
- Track gauge: 4 ft (1,219 mm)
- Propulsion system: Horse
- Depot: Fulford Cross

Statistics
- Route length: 3.1 miles (5.0 km)

The York Tramways Company and its successor the City of York Tramways Company provided a horse-drawn tramway service in York between 1881 and 1909.

== History ==
The York Tramways Company was incorporated by the York Tramways Order 1879, confirmed by the Tramways Orders Confirmation Act 1879. Construction started in July 1880 with a route to Fulford Village. The engineer was Joseph Kincaid.

Initially the company hoped to operate a steam tramway and Major General Charles Scrope Hutchinson from the Board of Trade approved the use of steam power. However, the steam experiment must have been unsuccessful as the company eventually gave up and maintained the service with horse cars.

Three routes were constructed from the city centre to Fulford Village, York railway station and Knavesmire.

A new company, the City of York Tramways Company was formed in 1886. It was a subsidiary of the Imperial Tramways Company based in Bristol. It acquired the assets of the York Tramways Company for £14,500 (equivalent to £1,629,472 in 2025).

By 1891 the company operated 10 tramcars with a stable of 37 horses.

== Closure ==
The system was taken over by York Corporation Tramways on 27 February 1909.
