= Colne and Trawden Light Railway Company =

Tramway in Lancashire from 1903 to 1934

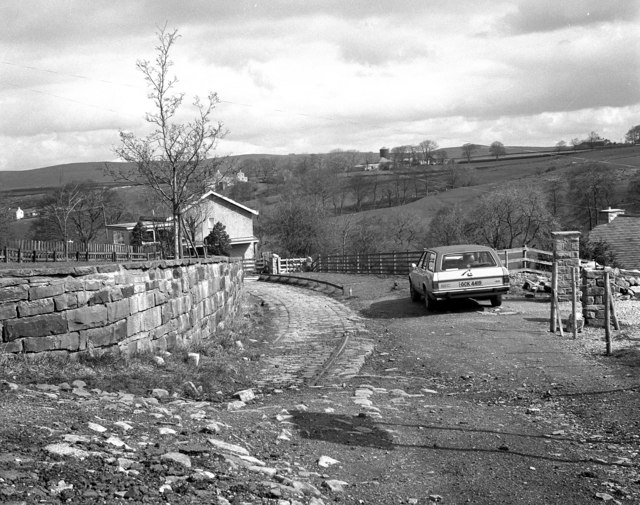
- Remains of the terminus at Trawden

Operation
- Locale: Colne, Trawden
- Open: 20 November 1903
- Close: 6 January 1934
- Status: Closed

Infrastructure
- Track gauge: 4 ft (1,219 mm)
- Propulsion system: Electric
- Depot: Heifer Lane

Statistics
- Route length: 7 miles (11 km)

The Colne and Trawden Light Railway Company operated a tramway service in Colne and Trawden between 1903 and 1934.

== History ==
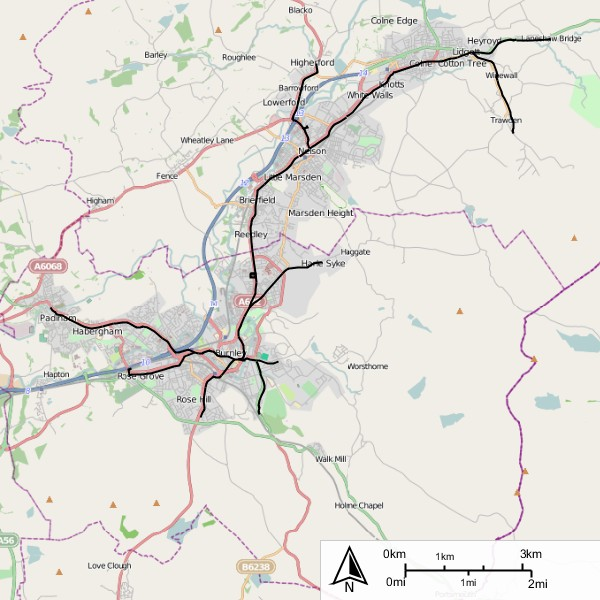
Map of the Tramways of Burnley, Nelson and Colne

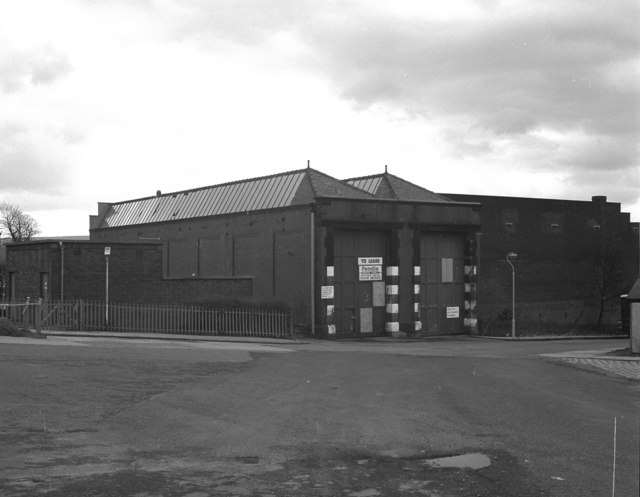
Heifer Lane Tram Depot, Colne. When buses replaced the trams in 1926-28, the buses used the same depot. By the time of this photograph (23 April 1983), it was no longer needed for bus operation, and was leased for other uses, but has now been demolished.

The tramway was authorised by the Colne and Trawden Light Railways Order 1901. It was built and operated by Greenwood & Batley of Leeds. Nuttal and Co were contractors for the permanent way, and R. W. Blackwell for the overhead wiring.

Construction started on 19 May 1903 when the Mayor of Colne, Alderman Varley, cut the first sod. Services started on the first section on 28 November 1903, and other sections opened in stages until the line reached Zion Chapel on Lane House Lane, Trawden by December 1905. A branch to Laneshawbridge opened by the end of December 1904. The system connected with Nelson Corporation Tramways.

Colne Corporation purchased the entire system on 24 March 1914 and the name was changed to Colne Corporation Light Railways.

== Fleet ==
The company purchased vehicles as follows:

- 1-6 G.F. Milnes & Co. 1903
- 7-9 Brush Electrical Machines, Loughborough 1903
- 10-12 Milnes Voss, 1906
- 13 United Electric Car Company 1914
- 14-16 Brush Electrical Machines, Loughborough 1926

== Closure ==
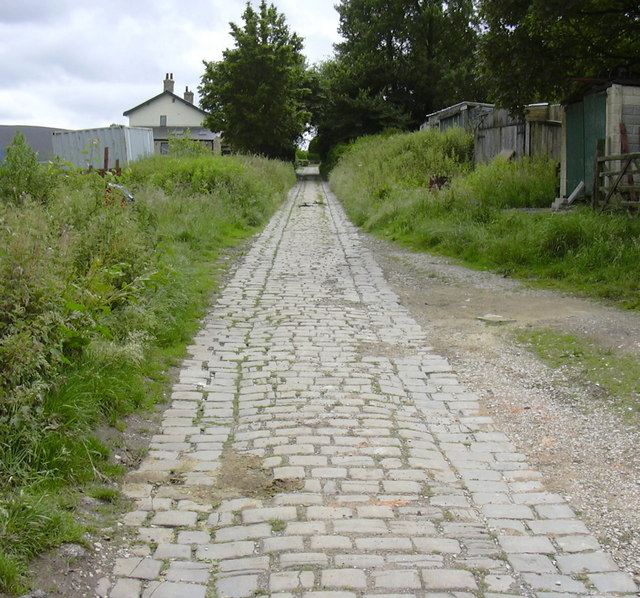
Route of the track on the private right of way in Trawden

The system closed on 6 January 1934. It was estimated that the tramcars had travelled over 4,582,000 miles and carried 57.5 million passengers during the years of operation.
