= Command paper =

British government document

The Interim Taylor Report into the Hillsborough disaster is an example of a command paper.

A command paper is an official document in the United Kingdom which is issued by His Majesty's Government (HMG) and presented to Parliament.

White papers, green papers, treaties, government responses, draft bills, reports from royal commissions, reports from independent inquiries and various government organisations can be released as command papers, so called because they are presented to Parliament formally "By His Majesty's Command".

== Dissemination ==
Command papers are:

- produced by government departments
- printed on behalf of His Majesty's Stationery Office (HMSO)
- presented to Parliament "by Command of His Majesty" by the appropriate government minister
- recorded by the House of Commons and the House of Lords
- published by government departments on gov.uk
- subject to statutory legal deposit

== Numbering ==
Command papers are numbered. Since 1870 they have been prefixed with an abbreviation of "command" which has changed over time to allow for new sequences.

Prefix	Dates	Numbers
	1833–1869	1 to 4222
C.	1870–1899	C. 1 to C. 9550
Cd.	1900–1918	Cd. 1 to Cd. 9239
Cmd.	1919–1956	Cmd. 1 to Cmd. 9889
Cmnd.	1956–1986	Cmnd. 1 to Cmnd. 9927
Cm.	1986–2018	Cm. 1 to Cm. 9756
CP	2019–	CP 1 upwards

== See also ==
- Office of Public Sector Information (OPSI)
- Treaty series
