= Dudley, Stourbridge and District Electric Traction Company =

Tramway operator in England

Dudley, Stourbridge and District Electric Tramways Company
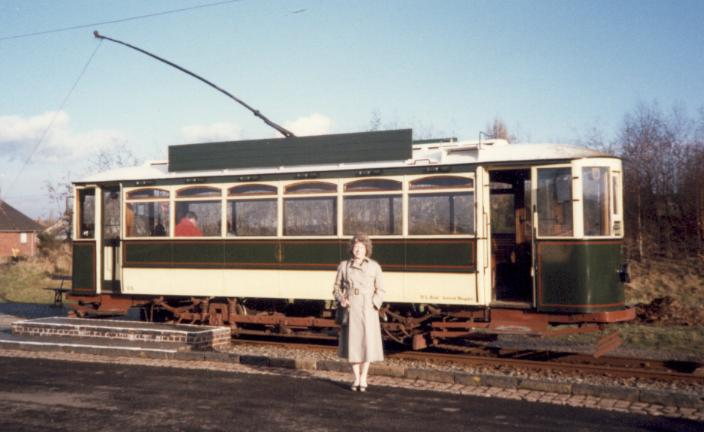
- Preserved tramcar No 5 at the Black Country Living Museum

Operation
- Locale: Dudley, Stourbridge
- Open: 26 July 1899
- Close: 1 March 1930
- Status: Closed

Infrastructure
- Track gauge: 3 ft 6 in (1,067 mm)
- Propulsion system: Electric
- Depots: Stourbridge Road, Amblecote

Statistics
- Route length: 21.24 miles (34.18 km)

The Dudley, Stourbridge and District Electric Tramways Company operated an electric tramway service between Dudley and Stourbridge and also other lines in the neighbourhood between 1899 and 1930.

== History ==
On 2 April 1898 the Dudley and Stourbridge Steam Tramways Company was purchased by British Electric Traction.

A programme of modernisation was undertaken and the service was converted for electric traction. The first electric service ran on 26 July 1899.

In April 1900 the company declared a net profit amount of £4,309 10s (equivalent to £458,000 in 2025) for the year ending December 1899. The share capital of the company was £200,000 (equivalent to £21,254,000 in 2025) divided into 20,000 5% cumulative preference shares of £5 each, and 20,000 ordinary shares of £5 each. By mid 1900 the British Electric Traction Company held 19,707 ordinary shares, of which 11,496 were purchased and the remainder allocated in part payment for the electrical conversion.

Extensions were opened as follows:

- 19 October 1900 from Queen's Cross in Dudley to Five Ways at the end of Cradley Heath High Street
- 7 December 1900 the Kingswinford branch
- 1 November 1902 Stourbridge to Lye and The Hayes
- 13 December 1902 Stourbridge to Wollaston Junction
- 19 December 1904 Old Hill to Blackheath

On 29 September 1902, the company took over ownership of the Kinver Light Railway for the sum of £60,000 (equivalent to £6,376,195 in 2025).

For the Whitsun weekend in 1904, the tramway saw impressive passenger numbers. The total for the four days commencing Saturday was over 185,000 which at fares of no more than 3d per journey (equivalent to £1.31 in 2025) represented an income of £1,100 (equivalent to £115,600 in 2025). The Dudley to Stourbridge section was the most popular. Of the 64,073 passengers carried on the Monday, 31,000 travelled between Dudley and Stourbridge with trams running every 5 minutes.

On 1 July 1904 ownership was transferred to the Birmingham and Midland Tramways Joint Committee, a subsidiary of British Electric Traction.

On 1 April 1924 the company took over some of the routes of the South Staffordshire Tramways Company.

The depot was situated in Amblecote on corner of Stourbridge Road and Collis Street. It was four track shed opened in October 1905. It was expanded with an additional two tracks in 1908, and a further track was added around 1914. It closed in May 1926 and used as a tram store until 1930.

== Closure ==
Route closures occurred on the following dates:

- 1926 Dudley to Kingswinford, Stourbridge to Kingswinford, and Stourbridge to Wollaston
- 1927 Stourbridge to Lye, and Old Hill to Blackheath
- 1929 Dudley to Cradley Heath
- 1 March 1930 Dudley to Stourbridge, and Dudley to Wednesbury.

== Survivals ==
Four vehicles are known to have survived:

- 5 (built 1920) Tram 5 entered service in 1920 with the Dudley, Stourbridge and District Company. At just over 32 feet long it accommodates 34 seated passengers and has two manually operated doors at each end. Withdrawn in 1930, it was sold for secondary use as a summer house before eventually being preserved in 1973. Restored by the Llangollen Railway in 2015–2016, Tram 5 is in the final commissioning stages and is expected back in operation in Summer 2017 at Black Country Living Museum.
- 36 (built 1901) Information
- 75 (built 1919) Information
- 102 (built 1920) Information
