= List of town tramway systems in the United Kingdom =

This is a list of town tramway systems in the United Kingdom divided by constituent country and by regions of England. It includes all tram systems, past and present. Most of the tram systems operated on 4 ft 8 1/2 in (1,435 mm) standard gauge (SG) or 3 ft 6 in (1,067 mm) track, although there were a small number of other gauges used. Where known, the track gauge is indicated in the 'Notes' column.

Most of these systems have closed, but a list of the remaining systems can be found at List of modern tramway and light rail systems in the United Kingdom. At the peak of Britain’s first-generation tramways, it was possible to travel all the way from Pier Head at Liverpool to the Pennines in Rochdale by tram.

== England, by region ==
=== East Midlands ===
Location	Name of system	Traction type	Date (from)	Date (to)	Notes
Alford	Alford and Sutton Tramway	Steam	2 April 1884	December 1889	2 ft 6 in (762 mm)
Burton upon Trent	Burton upon Trent Corporation Tramways	Electric	3 August 1903	31 December 1929	3 ft 6 in (1,067 mm)
Burton upon Trent	Burton and Ashby Light Railways	Electric	13 June 1906	19 February 1927	3 ft 6 in (1,067 mm)
Chesterfield	Chesterfield and District Tramways	Horse	8 November 1882	end of 1904	SG
Chesterfield	Chesterfield Corporation Tramways	Electric	20 December 1904	23 May 1927	SG
Derby	Derby Tramways Company	Horse	6 March 1880	1 June 1907	4 ft (1,219 mm)
Derby	Derby Corporation Tramways	Electric	27 July 1904	29 June 1934	4 ft (1,219 mm)
Ilkeston	Ilkeston Corporation Tramways	Electric	16 May 1903	15 January 1931	3 ft 6 in (1,067 mm)
Leicester	Leicester Tramways Company	Horse	24 December 1874	31 October 1904	SG
Leicester	Leicester Corporation Tramways	Electric	18 May 1904	9 November 1949	SG
Lincoln	Lincoln Tramways Company	Horse	8 September 1882	22 July 1905	SG
Lincoln	Lincoln Corporation Tramways	Electric	23 November 1905	4 March 1929	SG
Mansfield	Mansfield & District Light Railways.	Electric	16 July 1905	9 October 1932	SG
Matlock	Matlock Cable Tramway	Cable	28 March 1893	30 September 1927	SG
Northampton	Northampton Street Tramways	Horse	4 June 1881	18 August 1904	3 ft 6 in (1,067 mm)
Northampton	Northampton Corporation Tramways	Electric	21 July 1904	15 December 1934	3 ft 6 in (1,067 mm)
Nottingham	Nottingham and District Tramways Company Limited	Horse	17 September 1878	30 April 1902	SG
Nottingham	Nottingham and District Tramways Company Limited	Steam	1885	1889	SG
Nottingham	Nottingham Corporation Tramways	Electric	1 January 1901	5 September 1936	SG
Nottingham	Nottinghamshire and Derbyshire Tramways Company	Electric	4 July 1913	5 October 1932	SG
Nottingham	Nottingham Express Transit	Electric	9 March 2004		SG

=== East of England ===
Location	Name of system	Traction type	Date (from)	Date (to)	Notes
Cambridge	Cambridge Street Tramways	Horse	28 October 1880	18 February 1914	SG
Canvey Island	Canvey Island Tramways	Horse	1901	c.1904	Monorail.
Colchester	Colchester Corporation Tramways	Electric	28 July 1904	8 December 1929	3 ft 6 in (1,067 mm)
Ipswich	Ipswich Tramway	Horse	13 October 1880	6 June 1903	3 ft 6 in (1,067 mm)
Ipswich	Ipswich Corporation Tramways	Electric	23 November 1903	26 July 1926	3 ft 6 in (1,067 mm)
Lowestoft	Lowestoft Corporation Tramways	Electric	22 July 1903	8 May 1931	3 ft 6 in (1,067 mm)
Luton	Luton Corporation Tramways	Electric	21 February 1908	16 April 1932	SG
Norwich	Norwich Electric Tramways	Electric	30 July 1900	10 December 1935	3 ft 6 in (1,067 mm)
Peterborough	Peterborough Tramways	Electric	24 January 1903	15 November 1930	3 ft 6 in (1,067 mm)
Southend-on-Sea	Southend-on-Sea Corporation Tramways	Electric	19 July 1901	8 April 1942	3 ft 6 in (1,067 mm)
Wisbech	Wisbech and Upwell Tramway	Steam/Diesel	20 August 1883	31 December 1927	SG
Great Yarmouth	Yarmouth and Gorleston Tramways	Horse	25 March 1875	4 July 1905	4 ft 8 in (1,422 mm) then 3 ft 6 in (1,067 mm)
Great Yarmouth	Great Yarmouth Corporation Tramways	Electric	19 June 1902	14 December 1933	3 ft 6 in (1,067 mm)

=== Greater London ===
Location	Name of system	Traction type	Date (from)	Date (to)	Notes
London		Horse	23 March 1861; 2 May 1870	1861; 30 April 1915	SG
London		Cable	1884	1909	. SG.
London		Accumulator (storage battery)	1889	1892	SG
London		Electric	4 April 1901	5 July 1952	SG. see Trams in London. Tram tunnel (Kingsway tramway subway), 24 February 1906 – 5 April 1952.

Note: Horse tramways existed as several unconnected systems north of the Thames, a system (owned and operated by several undertakings) south of the River Thames, and two unconnected systems at Croydon.

Location	Name of system	Traction type	Date (from)	Date (to)	Notes
Kew Bridge–Richmond	West Metropolitan Tramways Company	Horse	1883	1912	SG. Not electrified.

==== Electric tramways – Inner London ====
Location	Name of system	Traction type	Date (from)	Date (to)	Notes
	London County Council		15 May 1903	5 July 1952	To London Passenger Transport Board (LPTB) from 1 July 1933. Nationalised on 1 January 1948 as the London Transport Executive.

Note: The LCC tramway system was assembled from predecessors including fourteen municipal and three company undertakings. Tramways were not built in the City of London and the West End of London because of local opposition. The South London system had segments north of the Thames, notably the Victoria Embankment. However, this system was not connected to the North London system until construction of the Kingsway tramway subway. Reintroduction planned: (Cross River Tram scheme), Camden Town / Kings Cross–Euston–Waterloo–Brixton / Peckham .

==== Other electric tramway operators ====
Location	Name of system	Traction type	Date (from)	Date (to)	Notes
Tramways absorbed by the London Passenger Transport Board (LPTB), or closed previously. Clockwise from north:
Walthamstow	Walthamstow Urban District Council Light Railways	Electric	3 June 1905	1939	SG. To LPTB from 1 July 1933.
Leyton	Leyton Urban District Council Tramways	Electric	1 June 1905	1939	SG
West Ham	West Ham Corporation Tramways	Electric	27 February 1904	1940	SG
East Ham	East Ham Corporation Tramways	Electric	22 June 1901	1940	SG
Ilford	Ilford Urban District Council Tramways	Electric	14 March 1903	1938	SG
Barking (Town)	Barking Town Urban District Council Light Railways	Electric	1 December 1903	16 February 1929	SG. (Last tramway line in Barking closed prior to creation of LPTB.)
Bexley	Bexley Urban District Council Tramways	Electric	3 October 1903	24 November 1935	SG
Erith	Erith Urban District Council Tramways	Electric	26 August 1905	9 November 1935	SG
Dartford	Dartford Urban District Council Light Railways	Electric	14 February 1906	23 November 1935	SG. Taken over by London Transport on 1 July 1933 and closed 23 November 1935
Croydon	Croydon Tramways Company	Horse	9 October 1879	3 January 1902	SG
Croydon	Croydon Corporation Tramways	Electric	26 September 1901	7 April 1951	SG
Croydon	South Metropolitan Electric Tramways	Electric	14 February 1906	September 1937	
West and South London	London United Tramways	Electric	4 April 1901	1931	SG
Middlesex, Hertfordshire	Metropolitan Electric Tramways	Horse	2 May 1870	1904 (?)	SG
Middlesex, Hertfordshire	Metropolitan Electric Tramways	Electric	22 July 1904	1939	SG
Currently operating or proposed:
Croydon/South London	Tramlink	Electric	10 May 2000		SG.
Camden–Peckham/Brixton	Cross River Tram	Electric	Proposal shelved since 2008		SG
Uxbridge–Shepherd's Bush	West London Tram	Electric	Proposal shelved since 2007		SG

=== North East England ===
Location	Name of system	Traction type	Date (from)	Date (to)	Notes
Darlington	Darlington Street Railroad Company	Horse	1 January 1862	1 January 1865	SG
Darlington	Stockton and Darlington Steam Tramway Company	Horse	1880	1904	3 ft (914 mm). Horse operated despite the company title. Not connected to the Stockton system operated by this company.
Darlington	Darlington Corporation Light Railways	Electric	2 June 1904	10 April 1926	3 ft 6 in (1,067 mm)..
Teesside	Middlesbrough and Stockton Tramways Company	Horse	20 January 1875	1898	SG. Sold out to Imperial Tramways Company in 1878
Teesside	Stockton and Darlington Steam Tramway Company	Steam	17 November 1881	1893	4 ft (1,219 mm). Not connected to the Darlington system operated by this company. Sold to the Stockton and District Tramways Company in 1893
Teesside	Stockton and District Tramways Company	Steam	1893	1896	4 ft (1,219 mm). Sold out to Imperial Tramways Company
Teesside	Middlesbrough, Stockton and Thornaby Electric Tramways Company	Electric	21 May 1898	2 April 1921	3 ft 7 in (1,093 mm). Operated by Imperial Tramways Company
Teesside	Middlesbrough Corporation Tramways	Electric	3 April 1921	9 June 1934	3 ft 7 in (1,093 mm). Middlesbrough, Stockton and Thornaby Electric Tramways Company until 1921
Teesside	Stockton-on-Tees Corporation Tramways	Electric	3 April 1921	9 June 1934	3 ft 7 in (1,093 mm). Middlesbrough, Stockton and Thornaby Electric Tramways Company until 1921
Teesside	Thornaby on Tees Corporation Tramways	Electric	3 April 1921	1 August 1930	3 ft 7 in (1,093 mm). Middlesbrough, Stockton and Thornaby Electric Tramways Company until 1921
Newcastle-upon-Tyne	Newcastle and Gosforth Tramways and Carriage Company	Horse	5 December 1878	13 April 1901	SG
Newcastle-upon-Tyne	Newcastle and Gosforth Tramways and Carriage Company	Steam	1882	1897	SG
Newcastle-upon-Tyne	Newcastle Corporation Tramways	Electric	16 December 1901	4 March 1950	SG. . Through workings to Gateshead from 1923. Newcastle served by Gateshead tramway system to 4 August 1951.
Gosforth–Wallsend–North Shields (Tyneside)	Tyneside Tramways and Tramroads Company	Electric	22 September 1902	6 April 1930	SG
North Shields–Tynemouth–Whitley Bay (Tynemouth)	Tynemouth and District Tramways	Horse	1883	1884	3 ft (914 mm). Taken over by North Shields and District Tramways Company in 1884 and North Shields and Tynemouth District Tramways in 1897
North Shields–Tynemouth–Whitley Bay (Tynemouth)	Tynemouth and District Tramways	Steam	1884	1900	3 ft (914 mm). Taken over by North Shields and District Tramways Company in 1884 and North Shields and Tynemouth District Tramways in 1897
North Shields–Tynemouth–Whitley Bay (Tynemouth)	Tynemouth and District Electric Traction Company	Electric	18 March 1901	4 August 1931	3 ft 6 in (1,067 mm)
Gateshead	Gateshead and District Tramways Company	Steam	October 1883	8 May 1901	SG
Gateshead	Gateshead and District Tramways Company	Electric	8 May 1901	4 August 1951	SG. . Through working to Newcastle from 1923.
South Shields	South Shields Tramways	Horse	1 August 1883 Mar 1887	1885 31 January 1906	3 ft 6 in (1,067 mm)
South Shields	South Shields Corporation Tramways	Electric	30 March 1906	31 March 1946	SG. .
Jarrow	Jarrow and District Electric Tramway	Electric	9 November 1906	30 June 1929	SG. .
Sunderland	Sunderland Tramways Company	Horse	28 April 1879	19 February 1901	SG
Sunderland	Sunderland Tramways Company	Steam	1880	1880	
Sunderland	Sunderland Corporation Tramways	Electric	15 August 1900	1 October 1954	SG. .
Grangetown–Ryhope–Philadelphia–Hetton-le-Hole (Sunderland District)	Sunderland District Electric Tramways	Electric	10 June 1905	12 July 1925	SG.
West Hartlepool	Hartlepools Steam Tramways Company	Steam	2 August 1884	21 February 1891	3 ft 6 in (1,067 mm)
West Hartlepool	Hartlepool Electric Tramways	Electric	19 May 1896	25 March 1927	3 ft 6 in (1,067 mm)

=== North West England ===
Location	Name of system	Traction type	Date (from)	Date (to)	Notes
Accrington	Accrington Corporation Steam Tramways Company	Steam	5 April 1886	31 December 1907	4 ft (1,219 mm)
Accrington	Accrington Corporation Tramways	Electric	1 January 1908	31 March 1932	4 ft (1,219 mm)
Ashton-under-Lyne	Ashton-Under-Lyne Corporation Tramways	Electric	19 August 1902	28 February 1938	SG
Ashton-under-Lyne	Oldham, Ashton and Hyde Electric Tramway	Electric	12 June 1899	1947	SG
Ashton-under-Lyne	Manchester Metrolink	Electric	11 February 2013		SG
Atherton	South Lancashire Tramways	Electric	20 October 1902	16 December 1933	SG
Barrow-in-Furness	Barrow-in-Furness Tramways Company	Steam	11 July 1885	13 July 1903	4 ft (1,219 mm)
Barrow-in-Furness	Barrow-in-Furness Tramways Company	Electric	6 February 1904	5 April 1932	SG
Birkenhead	Birkenhead Tramways Company	Horse	30 August 1860	8 November 1901	5 ft 2 in (1,575 mm) then SG
Birkenhead	Hoylake and Birkenhead Tramways	Horse	6 September 1873	12 October 1879	SG. Taken over by the Birkenhead Tramways Company
Birkenhead	Wirral Tramways Company	Horse	23 July 1877	22 January 1901	SG. Taken over by the Birkenhead Tramways Company
Birkenhead	Birkenhead Corporation Tramways	Electric	4 February 1901	17 July 1937	SG
Birkenhead	Wirral Tramway	Electric	14 April 1995	–	SG
Blackburn	Blackburn and Over Darwen Tramways Company	Steam	16 April 1881	9 July 1901	3 ft 6 in (1,067 mm)
Blackburn	Blackburn Corporation Tramways	Horse	28 May 1887	1901	SG
Blackburn	Blackburn Corporation Tramways	Electric	20 March 1899	3 September 1949	SG
Blackpool	Blackpool and Fleetwood Tramroad	Electric	14 July 1898	1 January 1920	SG. Taken over by Blackpool Corporation Tramways
Blackpool	Blackpool Electric Tramway Company	Electric	12 September 1885	10 September 1892	SG. Taken over by Blackpool Corporation Tramways
Blackpool	Blackpool Corporation Tramways	Horse, Conduit Electric and Overhead Electric	10 September 1892		SG
Bolton	Bolton Corporation Tramways	Horse	1 September 1880	1 January 1899	
Bolton	Bolton Corporation Tramways	Electric	9 December 1899	1947	SG
Burnley	Burnley & District Tramways Company	Steam	August 1881	1 March 1900	SG
Burnley	Burnley Corporation Tramways	Electric	16 December 1901	7 May 1935	4 ft (1,219 mm)
Bury		Horse	?	?	
Bury	Manchester, Bury, Rochdale and Oldham Tramways	Steam	1886	April 1904	SG and 3 ft 6 in (1,067 mm)
Bury	Bury Corporation Tramways	Electric	3 June 1903	13 February 1949	SG
Bury	Manchester Metrolink	Electric	6 April 1992		SG
Carlisle	City of Carlisle Electric Tramways	Electric	30 June 1900	21 November 1931	3 ft 6 in (1,067 mm)
Chester	Chester Tramways Company	Horse	10 June 1879	27 December 1902	SG
Chester	Chester Corporation Tramways	Electric	6 April 1903	15 February 1930	3 ft 6 in (1,067 mm)
Colne	Colne and Trawden Light Railway Company	Electric	28 November 1903	6 January 1934	4 ft (1,219 mm)
Darwen	Blackburn and Over Darwen Tramways Company	Steam	16 April 1881	16 October 1900	3 ft 6 in (1,067 mm)
Darwen	Darwen Corporation Tramways	Electric	16 October 1900	5 October 1946	4 ft (1,219 mm)
Farnworth	Farnworth Council Tramways	Horse, then electric	9 January 1902	1 April 1906	Taken over by South Lancashire Tramways
Glossop	Glossop Tramway	Electric	21 August 1903	24 December 1927	
Haslingden	Haslingden Corporation Tramways	Electric	1 January 1908	30 April 1930	Nominally independent, in practice part of Accrington Corporation Tramways
Heywood	Heywood Corporation Tramways	Steam	10 December 1904	20 September 1905	Taken over by Rochdale Corporation Tramways
Lancaster	Lancaster Corporation Tramways	Electric	14 January 1903	4 April 1930	SG
Lancaster	Lancaster and District Tramways	Horse	2 August 1890	31 December 1921	
Liverpool	Old Swan Tramway	Horse	1861	1862	
Liverpool	Liverpool Tramways Company	Horse	1 November 1869	25 August 1903	SG
Liverpool	Liverpool Corporation Tramways	Electric	16 November 1898	14 September 1957	SG
Liverpool	Great Crosby Tramway	Electric	19 June 1900	31 December 1925	
Waterloo & Great Crosby	Waterloo and Great Crosby Tramways Company	Electric	19 June 1900	31 December 1925	
Lytham St Annes		Town Gas	11 July 1896	1903	
Lytham St Annes	Lytham St. Annes Corporation Tramways	Electric	28 May 1903	28 April 1937	SG
Manchester	Manchester and Salford Tramways	Horse	17 May 1877	31 March 1903	
Manchester	Manchester Corporation Tramways	Electric	6 June 1901	10 January 1949	SG
Manchester	Manchester Metrolink	Electric	6 April 1992		SG
Middleton	Middleton Electric Traction Company	Electric	27 March 1902	1935	
Morecambe	Morecambe Tramways Company	Horse	3 June 1887	15 January 1912	
Morecambe	Morecambe Tramways Company	Petrol	15 January 1912	24 October 1924	
Morecambe	Morecambe Corporation Tramways	Horse	26 July 1909	6 October 1926	
Nelson	Nelson Corporation Tramways	Electric	23 February 1903	6 January 1934	4 ft (1,219 mm)
Oldham		Horse	16 September 1880	1 November 1901	
Oldham		Steam	November 1885	19 November 1901	
Oldham	Oldham Corporation Tramways	Electric	15 December 1900	3 August 1946	SG
Oldham	Manchester Metrolink	Electric	13 June 2012		SG
Preston	Preston Tramways Company	Horse	20 March 1879	31 December 1903	SG
Preston	Preston Corporation Tramways	Electric	7 June 1904	15 December 1934	SG
Radcliffe		Electric	4 January 1905	8 October 1938	
Rawtenstall	Rossendale Valley Tramways	Steam	10 November 1887	23 July 1909	
Rawtenstall	Rawtenstall Corporation Tramways	Electric	15 May 1909	31 March 1932	4 ft (1,219 mm)
Rawtenstall	Rawtenstall–Bacup	Steam	1889	?	
Rawtenstall	Rawtenstall–Bacup	Electric	1909	1932	
Rochdale	Manchester, Bury, Rochdale and Oldham Steam Tramways Company	Steam	7 March 1883	8 May 1905	
Rochdale	Rochdale Corporation Tramways	Electric	22 May 1902	3 July 1932	SG
Rochdale	Manchester Metrolink	Electric	28 February 2013		SG
St. Helens	St Helens and District Tramways Company	Horse	5 November 1881	May 1890	
St. Helens	St Helens and District Tramways Company	Steam	24 May 1890	7 April 1900	
St. Helens	New St Helens and District Tramways	Electric	20 July 1899	1 October 1919	SG
St. Helens	St Helens Corporation Tramways	Electric	1 October 1919	31 March 1936	SG
Salford	Salford Tramway	Horse	1861	1872	
Salford		Horse	30 July 1877	by October 1903	
Salford	Salford Corporation Tramways	Electric	4 October 1901	31 March 1947	
Salford	Manchester Metrolink	Electric	21 July 2000		SG
Southport	Southport Tramways Company	Electric	18 July 1900	31 December 1934	
Southport	Southport Corporation Tramways	Electric	18 July 1900	31 December 1934	SG
Southport	Southport Pier Tramway	Various	1862	June 2015	3 ft 6 in (1,067 mm). Replaced by land train.
Birkdale	Birkdale and Southport Tramways Company	Horse	12 May 1883	1896	
Stalybridge		Horse	14 June 1881	14 October 1903	
Stalybridge	Stalybridge, Hyde, Mossley and Dukinfield Tramways	Electric	12 June 1899	21 May 1945	
Stockport	Stockport and Hazel Grove Tramway	Horse	7 May 1880	24 January 1905	
Stockport	Stockport Corporation Tramways	Electric	26 August 1901	25 August 1951	
Trafford	Trafford Park Tramways	Gas, electric	23 July 1897	1 May 1908	
Trafford	Manchester Metrolink	Electric	6 April 1992		SG
Wallasey	Wallasey United Tramway and Omnibus Company	Horse	30 June 1879	19 March 1902	
Wallasey	Wallasey Corporation Tramways	Electric	17 March 1902	30 November 1933	SG
Warrington	Warrington Corporation Tramways	Electric	21 April 1902	28 August 1935	SG
Wigan	Wigan and District Tramways	Horse	2 August 1880	1882	
Wigan	Wigan and District Tramways	Steam	8 August 1882	26 September 1904	
Wigan	Wigan Corporation Tramways	Electric	25 January 1901	28 March 1931	3 ft 6 in (1,067 mm) and SG

=== South East England ===
Location	Name of system	Traction type	Date (from)	Date (to)	Notes
Aldershot and Farnborough	Aldershot and Farnborough Tramways Company	Horse		1906	
Brighton	Brighton Corporation Tramways	Electric	25 November 1901	31 August 1939	3 ft 6 in (1,067 mm)
Chatham	Chatham and District Light Railways Company	Electric	17 June 1902	30 September 1930	3 ft 6 in (1,067 mm). Served Chatham, Rochester and Gillingham.
Dover	Dover Corporation Tramways	Electric	6 September 1897	31 December 1936	3 ft 6 in (1,067 mm). .
Folkestone (Sandgate)–Hythe	Folkestone, Hythe and Sandgate Tramways	Horse	18 May 1891	30 September 1921	SG. Operation suspended 7 August 1914 – May 1919, operated only during summer season 1919–1921.
Gravesend	Gravesend, Rosherville and Northfleet Tramways	Horse	15 June 1883	30 June 1901	3 ft 6 in (1,067 mm)
Gravesend	Gravesend and Northfleet Electric Tramways	Electric	2 August 1902	28 February 1929	SG
Hastings	Hastings and District Electric Tramways	Electric	31 July 1905	15 May 1929	3 ft 6 in (1,067 mm)
Maidstone	Maidstone Corporation Tramways	Electric	14 July 1904	11 February 1930	3 ft 6 in (1,067 mm)
Margate–Ramsgate (Isle of Thanet)	Isle of Thanet Electric Tramways and Lighting Company	Electric	4 April 1901	24 March 1937	3 ft 6 in (1,067 mm)
Oxford	City of Oxford Tramways Company	Horse	1 December 1881	7 August 1914	4 ft (1,219 mm)
Portsmouth	Portsmouth Street Tramways	Horse	15 May 1865	1 January 1901	
Portsmouth	Portsmouth Corporation Transport	Electric	24 September 1901	10 October 1936	4 ft 7 3/4 in (1,416 mm). .
Cosham–Horndean	Portsdown and Horndean Light Railway	Electric	3 March 1903	9 January 1935	4 ft 7 3/4 in (1,416 mm)
Gosport–Fareham	Gosport and Fareham Tramways	Electric	20 December 1905	31 December 1929	
Reading	Reading Tramways Company	Horse	1879	21 July 1903	4 ft (1,219 mm)
Reading	Reading Corporation Tramways	Electric	22 July 1903	20 May 1939	4 ft (1,219 mm)
Rye–Camber	Rye and Camber Tramway	Steam	1895	?	3 ft (914 mm)
Rye–Camber	Rye and Camber Tramway	?	Petrol (gasoline)	4 September 1939	.
Sheerness	Sheerness and District Tramways	Electric	9 April 1903	7 July 1917	3 ft 6 in (1,067 mm)..
Shoreham-by-Sea	Brighton and Shoreham Tramways	Steam, then horse	3 July 1884	6 June 1913	3 ft 6 in (1,067 mm). Despite the company name, it never ran into Brighton.
Southampton	Southampton Tramways Company	Horse	5 May 1879	1 July 1898	SG
Southampton	Southampton Corporation Tramways	Electric	1 July 1898	31 December 1949	SG
Wantage	Wantage Tramway	Horse	11 October 1875	188_	SG
Wantage	Wantage Tramway	Steam	1 August 1876	31 July 1925	SG
Wolverton–Stony Stratford	Wolverton and Stony Stratford Tramway	Steam	27 May 1887	4 May 1926	3 ft 6 in (1,067 mm). .

=== South West England ===
Location	Name of system	Traction type	Date (from)	Date (to)	Notes
Bath	Bath Tramways Company	Horse	24 December 1880	25 July 1902	4 ft (1,219 mm)
Bath	Bath Electric Tramways Company	Electric	2 January 1904	6 May 1939	SG There is currently a proposal to re-instate the tram system.
Bristol	Bristol Tramways and Carriage Co Ltd	Horse	9 August 1875	1900	
Bristol	Bristol Tramways and Carriage Co Ltd	Steam	1880	1881	
Bristol	Bristol Tramways and Carriage Co Ltd	Electric	14 October 1895	11 April 1941	Closed because of bomb damage
Bournemouth	Bournemouth Corporation Tramways	Electric	23 July 1902	8 April 1936	3 ft 6 in (1,067 mm)
Camborne	Camborne and Redruth Tramways	Electric	7 November 1902	29 September 1927	3 ft 6 in (1,067 mm)
Cheltenham	Cheltenham and District Light Railway	Electric	17 August 1901	31 December 1930	3 ft 6 in (1,067 mm)
Devonport	Devonport and District Tramways	Electric	26 June 1901	20 October 1915	3 ft 6 in (1,067 mm). Taken over by Plymouth Corporation Tramways
Exeter	Exeter Tramway Company	Horse	6 April 1882	4 April 1905	3 ft 6 in (1,067 mm)
Exeter	Exeter Corporation Tramways	Electric	4 April 1905	19 August 1931	3 ft 6 in (1,067 mm)
Gloucester	Gloucester Tramways Company	Horse	26 May 1879	17 March 1904	4 ft (1,219 mm)
Gloucester	Gloucester Corporation Tramways	Electric	7 May 1904	12 January 1933	3 ft 6 in (1,067 mm)
Poole	Poole and District Electric Tramways	Electric	6 April 1901	8 June 1935	3 ft 6 in (1,067 mm). A British Electric Traction company; sold to Poole Corporation and leased to Bournemouth Corporation Tramways from June 1905.
Plymouth	Plymouth, Devonport and District Tramways	Steam	4 November 1884	14 November 1885	SG, then converted to 3 ft 6 in (1,067 mm)
Plymouth	Plymouth, Stonehouse and Devonport Tramways	Horse, then electric	18 March 1872	1 July 1922	3 ft 6 in (1,067 mm). Taken over by Plymouth Corporation Tramways.
Plymouth	Plymouth Corporation Tramways	Electric	22 September 1899	29 September 1945	3 ft 6 in (1,067 mm)
Seaton, Devon	Seaton Tramway	Electric	28 August 1970	operational	2 ft 9 in (838 mm)
Swindon	Swindon Corporation Tramways	Electric	22 September 1904	11 July 1929	3 ft 6 in (1,067 mm)
Taunton	Taunton Electric Traction Co Ltd	Electric	21 August 1901	28 May 1921	3 ft 6 in (1,067 mm)
Torquay	Torquay Tramways Co Ltd	Electric	4 April 1907	31 January 1934	3 ft 6 in (1,067 mm)
Weston-super-Mare	Weston-super-Mare & District Electric Supply Co Ltd	Electric	13 May 1902	17 April 1937	SG
Weymouth	Weymouth Harbour Tramway	Steam, then diesel	1865	2 May 1999	SG

=== West Midlands ===
Location	Name of system	Traction type	Date (from)	Date (to)	Notes
Birmingham	Birmingham and District Tramways Company	Horse	20 May 1872	24 May 1876	3 ft 6 in (1,067 mm). Sold to the Birmingham Tramways and Omnibus Company
Birmingham	Birmingham Tramways and Omnibus Company	Horse	24 May 1876	January 1886	3 ft 6 in (1,067 mm). Sold to the Birmingham Central Tramway Company
Birmingham	Birmingham and Aston Tramways Company	Steam	26 December 1882	30 June 1902	3 ft 6 in (1,067 mm). Sold to Aston Manor Urban District Council and leased to the City of Birmingham Tramways Company
Birmingham	Birmingham Central Tramway Company	Horse, steam, cable and accumulator	25 November 1884	29 September 1896	3 ft 6 in (1,067 mm). Sold to the City of Birmingham Tramways Company
Birmingham	Birmingham and Midland Tramways	Steam, horse and electric	6 July 1885	1 April 1928	From 13 August 1912 the company name was changed to the Birmingham District Power and Traction Company
Birmingham	Birmingham and Western Districts Tramways Company	Steam	August 1885	1899	Sold to British Electric Traction
Birmingham	City of Birmingham Tramways Company	Horse, steam, cable and accumulator	29 September 1896	31 December 1911	3 ft 6 in (1,067 mm). Sold to Birmingham Corporation Tramways
Birmingham	Birmingham Corporation Tramways	Electric	14 May 1901	4 July 1953	3 ft 6 in (1,067 mm)
Birmingham	West Midlands Metro	Electric	30 May 1999		SG
Stourbridge	Dudley and Stourbridge Steam Tramways Company	Steam	21 May 1884	25 July 1899	3 ft 6 in (1,067 mm)
Stourbridge	Dudley, Stourbridge and District Electric Traction Company	Electric	26 July 1899	1 March 1930	3 ft 6 in (1,067 mm). Part of "Black Country Tramway System".
Stourbridge	Kinver Light Railway	Electric	4 April 1901	8 February 1930	3 ft 6 in (1,067 mm). Part of "Black Country Tramway System".
Wednesbury	South Staffordshire and Birmingham District Steam Tramways Company	Steam	1883	1893	3 ft 6 in (1,067 mm)
Wednesbury	South Staffordshire Tramways Company	Electric	1 January 1893	1 April 1924	3 ft 6 in (1,067 mm). Part of "Black Country Tramway System". To Dudley, Stourbridge and District undertaking from 17 December 1930.
Wednesbury	West Midlands Metro	Electric	30 May 1999		SG
Walsall	South Staffordshire and Birmingham District Steam Tramways Company	Steam	1883	1901	3 ft 6 in (1,067 mm)
Walsall	Walsall Corporation Tramways	Electric	1 January 1901	30 September 1933	3 ft 6 in (1,067 mm)
Wolverhampton	Wolverhampton Tramways Company	Horse	1 May 1878	1 May 1900	SG. Purchased by Wolverhampton Corporation and converted to 3 ft 6 in (1,067 mm)
Wolverhampton	Wolverhampton Corporation Tramways	Electric	6 February 1902	11 July 1928	3 ft 6 in (1,067 mm).
Wolverhampton	West Midlands Metro	Electric	30 May 1999		SG
Wolverhampton–Dudley	Dudley, Sedgley and Wolverhampton Tramways Company	Horse	1 May 1878	18 October 1888	
Wolverhampton–Dudley	Midland Tramways Company	Horse	18 October 1888	1893	
Wolverhampton–Dudley	Dudley and Wolverhampton Tramways Company	Horse	1893	1899	
Wolverhampton–Dudley	Wolverhampton District Electric Tramways Company	Electric	9 January 1902	1929	3 ft 6 in (1,067 mm). Part of "Black Country Tramway System". To Wolverhampton Corporation Tramways from 1 September 1928.
Coventry	Coventry and District Tramways Company	Steam	1884	1893	3 ft 6 in (1,067 mm)
Coventry	Coventry Electric Tramways Company	Electric	5 December 1895	1 January 1912	3 ft 6 in (1,067 mm)
Coventry	Coventry Corporation Tramways	Electric	1 January 1912	14 November 1940	3 ft 6 in (1,067 mm). Closed because of bomb damage.
Coventry	Coventry Very Light Rail	Battery powered	Under construction (TBC 2024)		SG
Kidderminster–Stourport (-on-Severn)	Kidderminster and Stourport Electric Tramway Company	Electric	25 May 1898	2 April 1929.	3 ft 6 in (1,067 mm). Unconnected part of "Black Country Tramway System".
(Royal) Leamington (Spa)–Warwick	Leamington & Warwick Tramways & Omnibus Company	Horse	21 November 1881	15 March 1905	SG
(Royal) Leamington (Spa)–Warwick	Leamington & Warwick Tramways & Omnibus Company	Electric	15 July 1905	16 August 1930	SG
Stoke-on-Trent (The Potteries)	Staffordshire Potteries Street Railway Company	Horse	13 January 1862	2 March 1880	1,435 mm (4 ft 8 1/2 in) standard gauge
Stoke-on-Trent (The Potteries)	North Staffordshire Tramways Company	Steam	22 April 1881	27 June 1898	4 ft (1,219 mm)
Stoke-on-Trent (The Potteries)	Potteries Electric Traction Company	Electric	16 May 1899	1928	4 ft (1,219 mm). Also served Newcastle-under-Lyme.
Worcester	Tramways Trust Company	Horse	1881	1885	3 ft (914 mm)
Worcester	City of Worcester Tramways Company	Horse	1889	1894	3 ft (914 mm)
Worcester	Worcester Tramways Company	Horse	1894	25 June 1903	3 ft (914 mm)
Worcester	Worcester Electric Traction Company	Electric	6 February 1904	31 May 1928	3 ft 6 in (1,067 mm)

=== Yorkshire and the Humber ===
Location	Name of system	Traction type	Date (from)	Date (to)	Notes
Cleethorpes	Great Grimsby Street Tramways Company	Horse	1881	1901	SG
Cleethorpes	Great Grimsby Street Tramways Company	Electric	1 January 1902	November 1936	SG
Cleethorpes	Cleethorpes Corporation Tramways	Electric	15 July 1936	17 July 1937	SG. Cleethorpes took over the Great Grimsby Street Tramways lines within their boundary, the remainder going to Grimsby
Doncaster	Doncaster Corporation Tramways	Electric	2 June 1902	8 June 1935	SG
(Great) Grimsby	Great Grimsby Street Tramways Company	Horse	1881	1901	SG
(Great) Grimsby	Great Grimsby Street Tramways Company	Electric	1 January 1902	15 July 1936	SG
(Great) Grimsby	Grimsby Corporation Tramways	Electric	6 April 1925	31 March 1937	SG
Grimsby–Immingham	Grimsby and Immingham Electric Railway	Steam	3 January 1901	14 May 1912	SG
Grimsby–Immingham	Grimsby and Immingham Electric Railway	Electric	15 May 1912	1 July 1961	SG.
(Kingston upon) Hull	Hull Street Tramways Company	Horse	9 January 1875	1899	SG. Company in liquidation 1889, acquired by Hull Corporation 1895, last horse tram in city 1899
(Kingston upon) Hull	Drypool and Marfleet Steam Tramways Company	Steam	22 May 1889	1899	SG. Acquired by Hull Corporation 1899, last steam tram operated 1901
(Kingston upon) Hull	City of Hull Tramways	Electric	5 July 1899	30 June 1945	SG. Formed from the acquisition of Hull Street Tramways and Drypool and Marfleet Steam Tramways Company, system electrified 1899–1901; Trams replaced by trolleybuses in late 1930s and 1940s.
Leeds	Leeds Tramways Company	Horse	16 September 1871	13 October 1901	SG
Leeds	Leeds Tramways Company	Steam	17 June 1880	1 April 1902	SG
Leeds	Leeds Corporation Tramways	Electric	11 November 1891	7 November 1959	SG
Bradford	Bradford Tramways Company	Horse	1 February 1882	by 1903	4 ft (1,219 mm)
Bradford	Bradford Tramways Company and Bradford and Shelf Tramway Company	Steam	8 August 1882	by 1903	4 ft (1,219 mm)
Bradford	Bradford Corporation Tramways	Electric	March 1892 30 June 1898	March 1892 6 May 1950	4 ft (1,219 mm)
Keighley	Keighley Tramways Company	Horse	8 May 1889	28 May 1904	4 ft (1,219 mm)
Keighley	Keighley Corporation Tramways	Electric	12 October 1904	17 December 1924	SG
Shipley	Shipley Tramways Company	Horse	3 August 1882	9 October 1891	
Shipley	Mid-Yorkshire Tramways	Electric	23 July 1903	30 April 1904	Taken over by Bradford Corporation Tramways
Halifax	Halifax Corporation Tramways	Electric	9 June 1898	14 February 1939	3 ft 6 in (1,067 mm)
Huddersfield	Huddersfield Corporation Tramways	Horse	16 November 1882	1 April 1888	4 ft 7 3/4 in (1,416 mm)
Huddersfield	Huddersfield Corporation Tramways	Steam	11 January 1883	21 June 1902	4 ft 7 3/4 in (1,416 mm)
Huddersfield	Huddersfield Corporation Tramways	Electric	14 February 1901	29 June 1940	4 ft 7 3/4 in (1,416 mm)
Dewsbury	Yorkshire (Woollen District) Electric Tramways	Electric	18 February 1903	31 October 1934	SG. Also includes Batley Corporation Tramways
Dewsbury–Batley–Birstall	Dewsbury, Batley and Birstall Tramways Company	Horse and steam	25 July 1874	26 September 1905	
Dewsbury–Ossett	Dewsbury, Ossett and Soothill Nether Tramways	Electric	11 November 1908	19 October 1933	
Wakefield	Wakefield and District Light Railway	Electric	15 August 1904	25 July 1932	SG
Castleford	Yorkshire (West Riding) Electric Tramways	Electric	29 October 1906	1 November 1925	SG
Scarborough	Scarborough Tramways Company	Electric	6 May 1904	30 September 1931	3 ft 6 in (1,067 mm)
Sheffield	Sheffield Tramways Company	Horse	6 October 1873	11 November 1902	SG
Sheffield	Sheffield Corporation Tramways	Electric	5 September 1899	8 October 1960	SG
Sheffield	South Yorkshire Supertram	Electric	21 March 1994	in operation	SG.
Rotherham	Rotherham Tramway	Electric	31 January 1903	13 November 1949	SG
Rotherham	South Yorkshire Supertram	Electric	28 October 2018	in operation	SG Tram-train
Mexborough–Swinton	Mexborough and Swinton Tramways Company	Electric	16 February 1907	19 March 1929	SG
(Wath-upon-) Dearne (Dearne District)	Dearne District Light Railways	Electric	14 July 1924	30 September 1933	"Last" tramway system opened in the UK (until Manchester Metrolink).
Barnsley	Barnsley and District Tramway	Electric	31 October 1902	31 August 1930	SG
York	York Tramways Company and City of York Tramways Company	Horse	1880	27 February 1909	4 ft (1,219 mm)
York	York Corporation Tramways	Electric	20 January 1910	16 November 1935	3 ft 6 in (1,067 mm)

== Scotland ==
Location	Name of system	Traction type	Date (from)	Date (to)	Notes
Aberdeen	Aberdeen District Tramways	Horse	1874	1900	SG
Aberdeen	Aberdeen Corporation Tramways	Electric	23 December 1899	3 May 1958	SG. Replaced by motor buses.
Aberdeen–Bankhead and Aberdeen–Bieldside	Aberdeen Suburban Tramways	Electric	23 June 1904	9 June 1927	SG. Replaced by Aberdeen Corporation motor buses.
Ayr	Ayr Corporation Tramways	Electric	26 September 1901	31 December 1931	SG. Replaced by Western SMT motor buses.
Carstairs West	Carstairs House Tramway	Electric	6 February 1886	1905	2 ft 6 in (762 mm). First permanent electric railway in Scotland.
Carstairs West	Carstairs House Tramway	Horse	1905	1935	2 ft 6 in (762 mm)
Cruden Bay	Cruden Bay Hotel Tramway	Electric	1899	31 October 1932	3 ft 6 in (1,067 mm). Great North of Scotland Railway tramway linking Cruden Bay Hotel to railway station, replaced by a Rolls-Royce car.
Dumbarton	Dumbarton Burgh and County Tramways	Electric	20 February 1907	3 March 1928	4 ft 7 3/4 in (1,416 mm). Defunct, replaced by competitors' motor buses.
Dundee	Dundee and District Tramways	Horse	30 August 1877	12 July 1900	SG
Dundee	Dundee and District Tramways	Steam	1885	15 May 1902	SG
Dundee	Dundee Corporation Tramways	Electric	13 July 1900	20 October 1956	SG. Replaced by motor buses.
Dundee–Broughty Ferry	Dundee, Broughty Ferry and District Tramways	Electric	27 October 1905	16 May 1931	SG. Replaced by Dundee Corporation motor buses. Acquired by Dundee Corporation Tramways in 1931.
Dunfermline	Dunfermline and District Tramways	Electric	2 November 1909	15 July 1937	3 ft 6 in (1,067 mm). Replaced by Walter Alexander & Sons buses.
Edinburgh	Edinburgh Street Tramways	Horse	6 November 1871	23 October 1904	SG
Edinburgh	Edinburgh Street Tramways	Steam	23 April 1881	27 October 1882	SG. Previous operations in 1876, 1877 and 1880.
Edinburgh	Edinburgh Northern Tramways	Cable	28 January 1888	23 June 1923	SG
Edinburgh	Edinburgh Corporation Tramways	Electric	8 June 1910	16 November 1956	SG. Replaced by buses. For new tramway see Edinburgh Trams.
Edinburgh	Edinburgh Trams	Electric	31 May 2014	in operation	SG
Leith	Leith Corporation Tramways	Horse	16 November 1871	24 August 1907	SG. Incorporated into Edinburgh Corporation Tramways in 1922.
Leith	Leith Corporation Tramways	Electric	18 May 1905	20 November 1920	SG. Absorbed by Edinburgh Corporation Tramways 1920, last trams ran in Leith 11 March 1956.
Leith	Edinburgh Trams	Electric	7 June 2023	in operation	SG
Musselburgh	Musselburgh and District Electric Light and Traction Company	Electric	12 December 1904	15 February 1928	SG. Absorbed by Edinburgh Corporation Tramways 1928, last trams ran in Musselburgh 1954.
Falkirk	Falkirk and District Tramways	Electric	21 October 1905	21 July 1936	4 ft (1,219 mm). Replaced by Walter Alexander & Sons motor buses.
Glasgow	Glasgow Tramway and Omnibus Company	Horse	19 August 1872	1898	4 ft 7 3/4 in (1,416 mm)
Glasgow	Glasgow Tramway and Omnibus Company	Steam	1877	?	4 ft 7 3/4 in (1,416 mm)
Glasgow	Glasgow Corporation Tramways	Electric	13 October 1898	31 August 1962	4 ft 7 3/4 in (1,416 mm). Replaced by motor buses and trolleybuses.
Govan		Horse	1873	1877	
Govan		Steam	August 1877	1901	
Govan		Electric	10 August 1901	1912	operated by Glasgow Corporation, Burgh of Govan amalgamated with Glasgow in 1912
Airdrie and Coatbridge	Airdrie and Coatbridge Tramways	Electric	18 February 1904	31 December 1921.	4 ft 7 3/4 in (1,416 mm). Absorbed by Glasgow Corporation Tramways 1921, last trams ran in Coatbridge 3 November 1956.
Paisley	Paisley Tramways Company	Horse	30 December 1885	21 November 1903	4 ft 7 3/4 in (1,416 mm)
Paisley	Paisley District Tramways Company	Electric	13 June 1904	1 August 1923	4 ft 7 3/4 in (1,416 mm). Absorbed by Glasgow Corporation Tramways 1923, last trams ran in Paisley 11 May 1957
Greenock	Greenock & Port Glasgow Tramway Co.	Horse	7 June 1873	1901	
Greenock	Greenock & Port Glasgow Tramway Co.	Electric	1901	15 July 1929	replaced by motor buses
Inchture	Inchture Village Tram	Horse	1895	1916	SG. Caledonian Railway horse tramway linking village to railway station
Kilmarnock	Kilmarnock Corporation Tramways	Electric	10 December 1904	3 May 1926	SG. Replaced by motor buses
Kirkcaldy	Kirkcaldy Corporation Tramways	Electric	28 February 1903	15 May 1931	3 ft 6 in (1,067 mm). Replaced by Walter Alexander & Sons motor buses
Kirkcaldy to Leven	Wemyss and District Tramways Company	Electric	25 August 1906	30 January 1932	3 ft 6 in (1,067 mm). Replaced by motor buses
Motherwell and Hamilton area	Lanarkshire Tramways	Electric	22 July 1903	14 February 1931	4 ft 7 3/4 in (1,416 mm). Replaced by motor buses
Perth	Perth and District Tramways	Horse	17 September 1895	7 October 1903	3 ft 6 in (1,067 mm)
Perth	Perth Corporation Tramways	Electric	31 October 1905	19 January 1929	3 ft 6 in (1,067 mm). Replaced by Walter Alexander & Sons motor buses
Rothesay	Rothesay and Ettrick Bay Light Railway	Horse	1 June 1882	2 March 1902	4 ft (1,219 mm)
Rothesay	Rothesay and Ettrick Bay Light Railway	Electric	19 August 1902	30 September 1936	3 ft 6 in (1,067 mm). Replaced by motor buses
Stirling	Stirling and Bridge of Allan Tramways	Horse	27 July 1874	20 May 1920	SG. Replaced by Scottish General Omnibus Co. motor buses

== Wales ==
=== North Wales ===
Location	Name of system	Traction type	Date (from)	Date (to)	Notes
Barmouth	Barmouth Junction and Arthog Tramway	Horse	1899	1903	3 ft (914 mm)
Fairbourne	Fairbourne Tramway	Horse	1898	1916	2 ft (610 mm)
Glyn Ceiriog	Glyn Valley Tramway	Horse	1 April 1874	31 March 1886	2 ft 4 1/2 in (724 mm)
Glyn Ceiriog	Glyn Valley Tramway	Steam	15 March 1891	6 April 1933	2 ft 4 1/2 in (724 mm)
Harlech	Harlech Tramway	Horse	1878	1886	
Llandudno	Llandudno and Colwyn Bay Electric Railway Ltd	Electric	19 October 1907	24 March 1956	3 ft 6 in (1,067 mm)
Llandudno	Great Orme Tramway	Cable	31 July 1902	in operation	3 ft 6 in (1,067 mm)
Pwllheli	Pwllheli Corporation Tramways	Horse	24 July 1899	c. September 1920	2 ft 6 in (762 mm)
Pwllheli	Pwllheli and Llanbedrog Tramway	Horse	1 August 1896	28 October 1927	3 ft (914 mm)
Wrexham	Wrexham District Tramways	Horse	1 November 1876	26 April 1901	
Wrexham	Wrexham and District Electric Tramways	Electric	4 April 1903	31 March 1927	3 ft 6 in (1,067 mm)

=== South Wales ===
Location	Name of system	Traction type	Date (from)	Date (to)	Notes
Aberdare	Aberdare Urban District Council Tramways	Electric	9 October 1913	31 March 1935	3 ft 6 in (1,067 mm)
Cardiff	Cardiff Tramways Company	Horse	12 July 1872	17 October 1902	SG
Cardiff	Cardiff District and Penarth Harbour Tramways	Horse	28 November 1881	10 February 1903	SG
Cardiff	Cardiff Corporation Tramways	Electric	2 May 1902	19 February 1950	SG
Llanelly (Llanelli)	Llanelly Tramways	Horse	28 September 1882	31 March 1908	3 ft (914 mm)
Llanelly (Llanelli)	Llanelly and District Electric Tramways	Electric	19 July 1911	16 February 1933	SG
Merthyr Tydfil	Merthyr Tydfil Electric Tramways	Electric	6 April 1901	23 August 1939	3 ft 6 in (1,067 mm)
Neath	Neath and District Tramways Company	Horse	9 November 1875	1899	SG
Neath	Neath Corporation Tramways	Gas	31 August 1899	8 August 1920	SG. "Gas" refers to town gas, not petrol (gasoline). One car is preserved locally at the Cefn Coed Colliery Museum.
Newport	Newport Tramways Company	Horse	1 February 1875; 30 July 1894	28 July 1894; 3 November 1903	
Newport	Newport Corporation Tramways	Electric	9 April 1903	5 September 1937	3 ft 6 in (1,067 mm)
Pontypridd	Pontypridd and Rhondda Valley Tramway	Horse	Mar 1888	July 1903	3 ft 6 in (1,067 mm)
Pontypridd	Pontypridd Urban District Council Tramways	Electric	5 March 1905	30 August 1931	3 ft 6 in (1,067 mm)
Rhondda	Pontypridd and Rhondda Valley Tramway	Horse	Mar 1888	July 1903	3 ft 6 in (1,067 mm)
Rhondda	Rhondda Tramways Company	Electric	11 July 1908	1 February 1934	3 ft 6 in (1,067 mm)
Swansea	Swansea Improvements and Tramway Company	Horse	12 April 1878	1901	SG
Swansea	Swansea Improvements and Tramway Company	Steam	1882	1884	SG
Swansea	Swansea Constitution Hill Incline Tramway	Cable	1898	1902	3 ft 6 in (1,067 mm). Street funicular.
Swansea	Swansea Improvements and Tramway Company	Electric	30 June 1900	29 June 1937	SG
Swansea–Mumbles	Swansea and Mumbles Railway, Mumbles Train	Horse	25 March 1807; 1860	1826; 1877	4 ft (1,219 mm) then SG. Believed to be the world's first public passenger rail service. Early traction experiments included wind (sail mounted on passenger carriage). Passenger service withdrawn 1826, restored 1860 following reconstruction of the line.
Swansea–Mumbles	Swansea and Mumbles Railway, Mumbles Train	Steam	17 August 1877	1929	SG. Two competing undertakings operated service on the line, ca. 1879 – ca. 1898. One used steam traction. The other was compelled (by court order, obtained by its rival) to use horse traction. Traction experiments prior to electrification included accumulator (storage battery), petrol (gasoline) and diesel.
Swansea–Mumbles	Swansea and Mumbles Railway, Mumbles Train	Electric	2 March 1929	5 January 1960	SG. . One car preserved following closure, but scrapped after being vandalised.

== Northern Ireland ==
Location	Name of system	Traction type	Date (from)	Date (to)	Notes
Belfast	Belfast Street Tramways	Horse	28 August 1872	1 January 1905	5 ft 3 in (1,600 mm) then SG
Belfast	Sydenham District, Belfast, Tramway	Horse	1888	1902	Purchased by Belfast Street Tramways in 1902
Belfast	Belfast and Ligoniel Tramway	Horse	24 April 1893	1902	Purchased by Belfast Street Tramways in 1902
Belfast	Belfast and County Down Railway tramway	Horse	1894	1902	Purchased by Belfast Corporation in 1902
Belfast	Belfast Corporation Tramways	Electric	1 January 1905	10 February 1954	4 ft 9 in (1,448 mm)
Cavehill Whitewell	Cavehill and Whitewell Tramway	Steam	1 July 1882	1892	SG. Taken over by Belfast Corporation Tramways
Cavehill Whitewell	Cavehill and Whitewell Tramway	Horse	1892	1906	SG. Taken over by Belfast Corporation Tramways
Cavehill Whitewell	Cavehill and Whitewell Tramway	Electric	12 February 1906	1 July 1911	SG. Taken over by Belfast Corporation Tramways
Derry	City of Derry Tramways	Horse	1 April 1897	1920	SG
Fintona	Londonderry and Enniskillen Railway (1853–83); GNR(I) (1883–1957)	Steam	15 June 1853	16 January 1854	5 ft 3 in (1,600 mm)
Fintona	Londonderry and Enniskillen Railway (1853–83); GNR(I) (1883–1957)	Horse	16 January 1854	30 September 1957	5 ft 3 in (1,600 mm). Railway branch, worked by horse-drawn tram from 1854 to closure in 1957.
Bessbrook–Newry	Bessbrook and Newry Tramway	Electric	1 October 1885	10 January 1948	3 ft (914 mm) , .
Glenanne–Loughgilly	Glenanne Loughgilly Tramway	Horse	1897	1919	1 ft 10 in (559 mm)
Warrenpoint–Rostrevor	Warrenpoint and Rostrevor Tramway	Horse	1 August 1877	February 1915	3 ft (914 mm)
Portrush–Bushmills–Giant's Causeway	Giant's Causeway, Portrush and Bush Valley Railway & Tramway Company, Ltd.	Steam	29 January 1883	1926(?)	3 ft (914 mm)
Portrush–Bushmills–Giant's Causeway	Giant's Causeway, Portrush and Bush Valley Railway & Tramway Company, Ltd.	Electric	15 November 1883	30 September 1949	3 ft (914 mm). . Operation suspended during winter, 1927–1939, 1947–1948.
Portstewart	Portstewart Tramway	Steam	1882	1926	3 ft (914 mm)

Note for Giant's Causeway Tramway: Portrush–Bushmills opened 29 January 1883. Bushmills–Giant's Causeway opened 1 July 1887. World's first use of electric traction with hydroelectric generation. Track built in street in Portrush.

== Isle of Man ==
- List of town tramway systems in Europe – Isle of Man

== See also ==
- List of trolleybus systems in the United Kingdom
- List of modern tramway and light rail systems in the United Kingdom
- List of town tramway systems in Scotland
- List of town tramway systems in Europe
- List of town tramway systems
- List of tram and light rail transit systems
- Lists of rapid transit systems
- List of trolleybus systems
