= Glenanne =

Glenanne may refer to:

- Glenanne Hockey Club, a field hockey club based in Tallaght, South Dublin, Ireland.
- Glenanne Loughgilly Tramway, a defunct tram service in County Armagh, Ireland
- Glenanne, a village near Mountnorris, County Armagh, Northern Ireland
- Glenanne gang, a secret informal alliance of Ulster loyalists
- Glenanne barracks bombing, a large truck bomb attack carried out by the Provisional IRA against a British Army base

== See also ==
- Fiona Glenanne, a fictional character in the TV series Burn Notice
- Glenanna, a historic home located at Floyd, Floyd County, Virginia.
