= Middlesbrough and Stockton Tramways Company =

English tram company, 1875–1898

Operation
- Locale: Middlesbrough
- Open: 20 January 1875
- Close: 1898
- Status: Closed

Infrastructure
- Track gauge: 4 ft 8 1/2 in (1,435 mm)
- Propulsion system: Horse

Statistics
- Route length: 2.59 miles (4.17 km)

The Middlesbrough and Stockton Tramways Company operated a horse-drawn tramway service in Middlesbrough between 1875 and 1898.

== History ==
The Middlesbrough and Stockton Tramways opened for service on 20 January 1875 with horse-drawn cars between Albert Road, Middlesbrough and Newport. The depot and stables were at Newport.

A second line Albert Road to Benson Street in Linthorpe opened on 17 April 1876.

The company sold out in August 1878 to the Imperial Tramways Company but the new company acted as a parent and services were still operated under the name of the Middlesbrough and Stockton Tramways Company.

Further extensions included Calvert Street to the Newport Ferry landing, and from Albert Road, via Albert Bridge to Ferry Road. This last extension opened on 8 February 1882.

== Closure ==
Following the acquisition of the Stockton and District Tramways Company by the Imperial Tramways Company, plans were adopted for a large network comprising all of this company's routes in the area, and the horse lines closed down in 1897 and 1898 for reconstruction as work progressed for the Middlesbrough, Stockton and Thornaby Electric Tramways Company.
