= Ipswich Corporation Tramways =

Tramway operator in England

Coordinates: 52.05526°N 1.14262°E

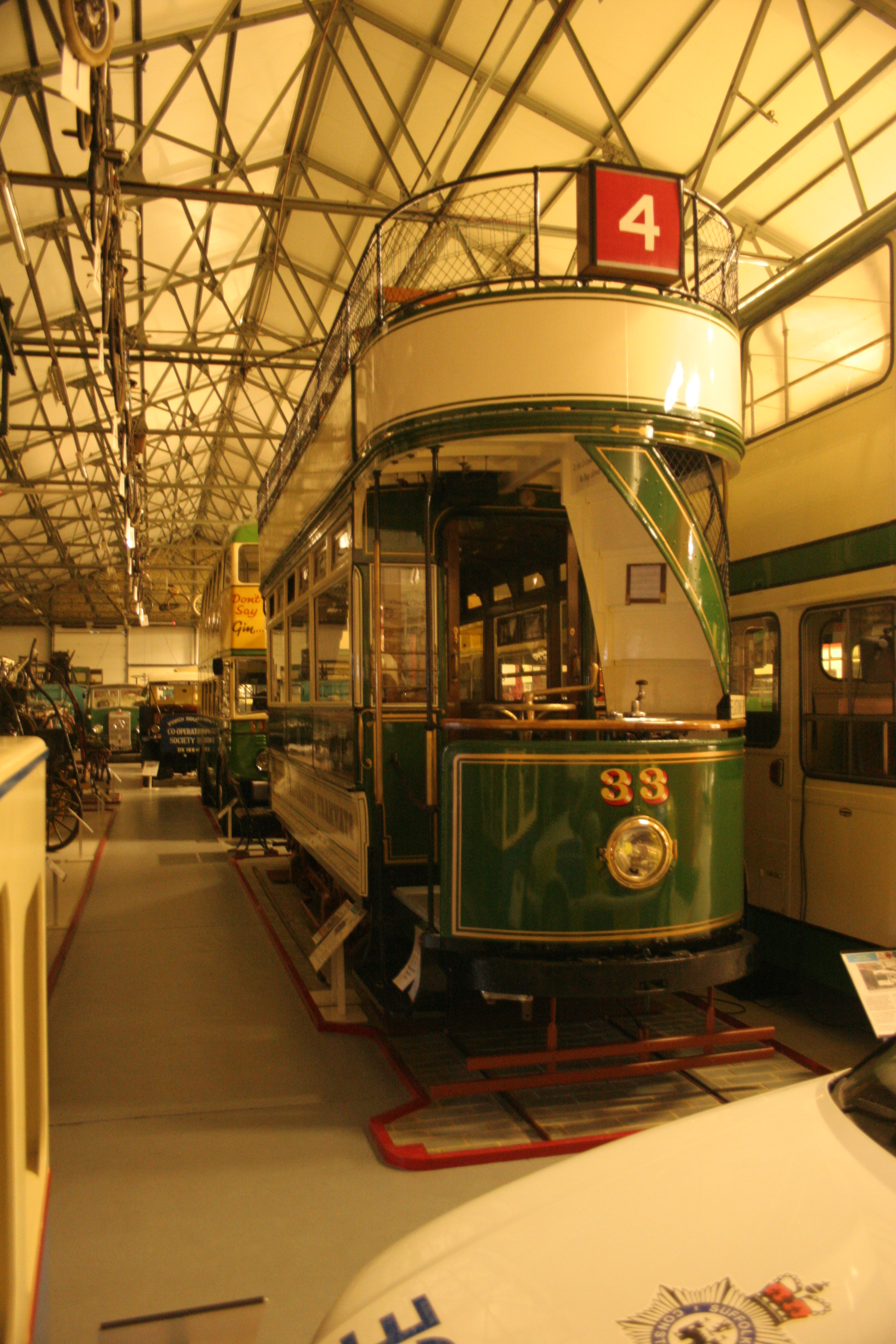
- Car 33 preserved at Ipswich Transport Museum

Operation
- Locale: Ipswich
- Open: 1 November 1901
- Close: 26 July 1926
- Status: Closed

Infrastructure
- Track gauge: 3 ft 6 in (1,067 mm)
- Propulsion system: Electric

Statistics
- Route length: 10.82 miles (17.41 km)

Ipswich Corporation Tramways was an electric tramway system that served the town of Ipswich in Suffolk from 23 November 1903 until 26 July 1926.

== Infrastructure ==
=== Horse tramway ===
Ipswich's horse tramway (Ipswich Tramway) had been operating since 1880 from a depot located at the junction of Quadling Street and New Cardinal Street (TM 15900 44087), and with a total length of 4.25 miles (6.84 km).

=== Electric tramway ===
In 1903 the electric tramway replaced the horse tramway. Extensions to the system increased track length to 10.82 miles (17.41 km) producing a network that centred upon Cornhill (TM 16238 44639). From Cornhill the lines ran along:

- Westgate Street, St Matthew Street, Barracks Corner, Mill Street, Portman Road to junction with Princes Street. Spur along Portman's Walk to the depot at Constantine Road.
- Westgate Street, St Matthew Street, Barracks Corner, Norwich Road to a terminus at TM 14098 47501 (Whitton Maypole)
- Westgate Street, St Matthew Street, Barracks Corner, Norwich Road, Bramford Road to a terminus just east of the railway line at TM 14470 45571
- Tavern Street, Carr Street, Major's Corner, St Helen's Street, Spring Road, St John's Road, Cauldwell Hall Road to a terminus at TM 18339 43944 (Derby Road railway station).
- Tavern Street, Carr Street, Major's Corner, St Helen's Street, Spring Road to a terminus at the junction with Woodbridge Road at TM 18977 44987.
- Princes Street to a terminus at TM 15724 43822(Ipswich railway station).

The depot, consisting of a power station and tram shed, was in Constantine Road (TM 15522 44301). The buildings are still in use by motorbuses.

== Tramcars ==
The fleet, in a livery of dark green and cream, consisted of 36 Brush open top double deck tramcars.

== Closure ==
Line closures started in 1923 and were completed in 1926. Five of the tramcars and one tramcar body were sold to Scarborough Tramways Company. The tramway system was replaced by a trolleybus system.

== See also ==
List of town tramway systems in the United Kingdom
