= Morecambe Tramways =

Tramway in Morecambe, Lancashire

Coordinates: 54.0640°N 2.8786°W

Operation
- Locale: Morecambe
- Open: 3 June 1887
- Close: 24 October 1924
- Status: Closed

Infrastructure
- Track gauge: 4 ft 8 1/2 in (1,435 mm)
- Propulsion system: Horse/Petrol

Statistics
- Route length: 3.59 miles (5.78 km)

Morecambe Tramways served the town of Morecambe in Lancashire from 3 June 1887 until 24 October 1924.

== History ==
Morecambe Tramways Act 1886
- Act of Parliament
- Parliament of the United Kingdom
- Long title: An Act for incorporating and conferring powers on the Morecambe Tramways Company.
- Citation: 49 & 50 Vict. c. xxv

Dates
- Royal assent: 4 June 1886

Text of statute as originally enacted

Morecambe Tramways Company Act 1910
- Act of Parliament
- Parliament of the United Kingdom
- Long title: An Act to authorise the use of mechanical power upon the tramway of the Morecambe Tramways Company to confer powers on the Company with respect to capital and for other purposes.
- Citation: 10 Edw. 7 & 1 Geo. 5. c. xiii

Dates
- Royal assent: 17 June 1910

The first section to open (1869) was from the Central Pier to the Battery Hotel. In 1888 the line was extended from the hotel to Strawberry Gardens in Heysham, and in 1895 an extension was built from the pier to East View. These lines were built and owned by the Morecambe Tramways Company Limited. Finally in 1897 an extension was built to Bare by Morecambe Corporation and leased to the tramways company. In 1909 Morecambe Corporation purchased the section between Battery and Bare, leaving the tramway company to operate the 1.25 mile Battery to Strawberry Gardens section. This section was relaid and operated using petrol mechanical trams from 1912 to 24 October 1924.

== Infrastructure ==
The network was linear, of length 3.59 miles, with a depot on the Heysham Road at SD 4200 6325 between Stanley Road and Cumberland View Road.

== Tramcars ==
The fleet, in a livery of maroon, teak and white, and later green, consisted of:

- 2 single deck tramcars
- 15 double deck horse tramcars
- 4 single deck petrol tramcars

== See also ==
- List of town tramway systems in the United Kingdom
