= Great Yarmouth Corporation Tramways =

Tramway operator in England

Coordinates: 52.621106°N 1.72848°E

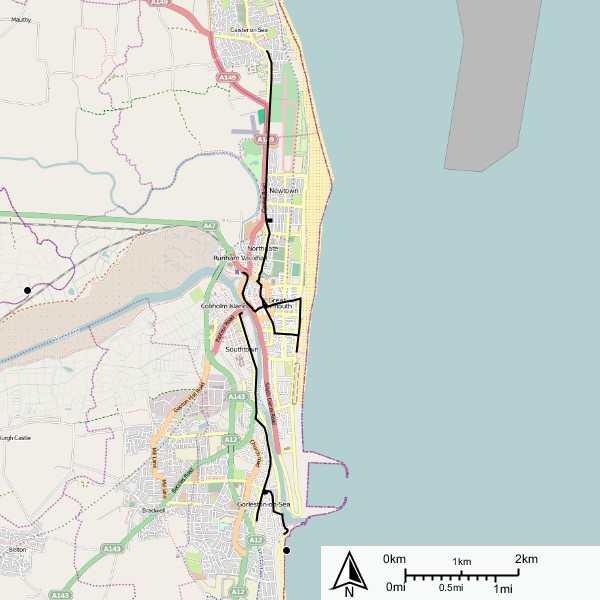
- Map of the routes of Great Yarmouth Corporation Tramways

Operation
- Locale: Great Yarmouth
- Open: 4 July 1905
- Close: 14 December 1933
- Status: Closed

Infrastructure
- Track gauge: 3 ft 6 in (1,067 mm)
- Propulsion system: Electric

Statistics
- Route length: 9.94 miles (16.00 km)

Great Yarmouth Corporation Tramways served the town of Great Yarmouth in Norfolk, England from 19 June 1902 until 14 December 1933.

== History ==
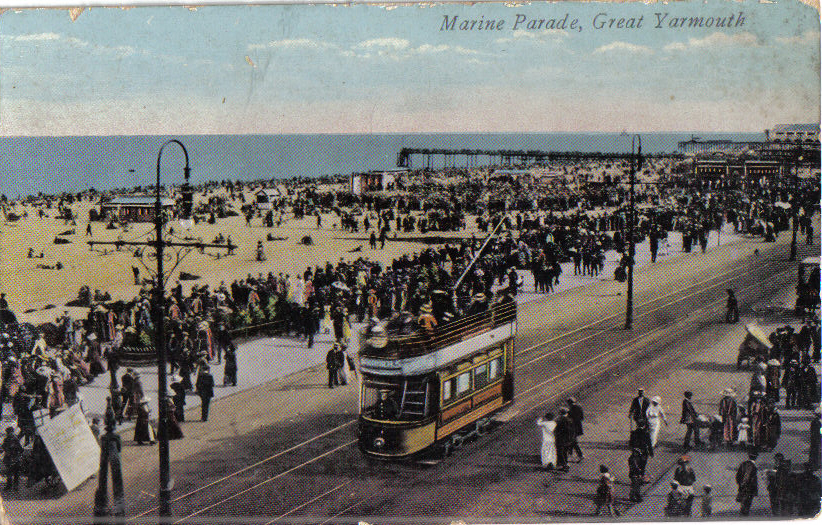
Marine Parade, Great Yarmouth

The tramway system comprised two separate sections divided by the River Yare. The Haven Bridge over the River Yare was a lifting bridge and not suitable for a tramway.

To the east of the river was the larger part which opened on 19 June 1902. It ran from Wellington Pier, along Marine Parade, St Peters Road, King Street, Market Place, Northgate Street and Caister Road, and from Vauxhall station, along North Quay, Hall Quay, Regent Street, Market Place, Regent Street, Marine Parade and to Wellington Pier.
The depot for the eastern section was located on the east side of Caister Road just south of its junction with Hamilton Road at TG 52463 09080. The site is now used as a motorbus depot.

The smaller western section was previously the horse drawn Yarmouth and Gorleston Tramway system. It commenced operation as an electric tramway on 4 July 1905 and ran from Yarmouth South Town railway station, along Southtown Road, Gorleston High Street and Springfield Road, and had a branch from Gorleston High Street, along Pier Plain, England Lane to Brush Quay and the beach at TG 52984 03818. The depot for the western section was located on the east side of Lowestoft Road just south of its junction with Baker Street at TG 52626 04280.

== Fleet ==
- 1-14 Brush Electrical Engineering Company 1905 - allocated to the Eastern section
- 15-26 Brush Electrical Engineering Company 1905 - allocated to the Gorleston section
- 27-35 Brush Electrical Engineering Company 1906, 1907

== Tramcars ==
The fleet, in a livery of maroon and cream, consisted of:

- 35 Brush open top double deck tramcars

== Closure ==
The corporation started to introduce motorbuses in 1920, and tram routes were closed from 1924 onwards. The western section finally closed on 25 September 1930, and the eastern section on 14 December 1933. Some of the tramcar bodies were used as chalets at Caister Holiday Camp.

== See also ==
List of town tramway systems in the United Kingdom
