= Leicester Corporation Tramways =

Tramway operator in England

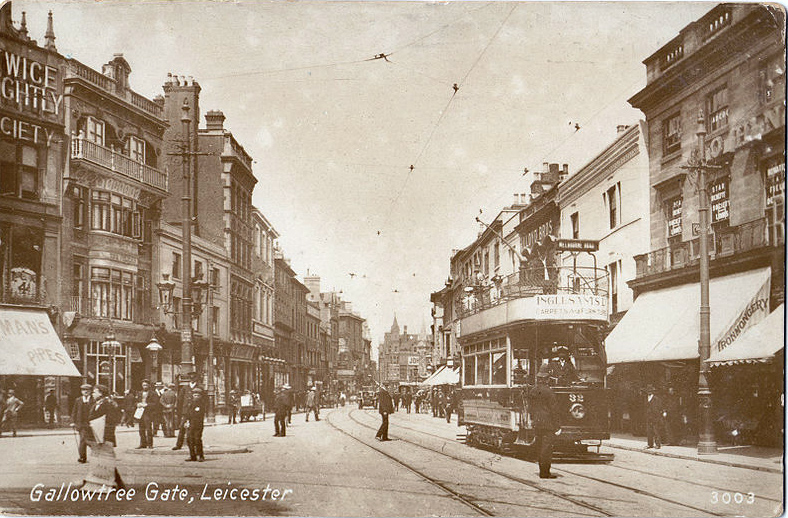
- Tram on Gallowtree Gate, Leicester ca. 1917

Operation
- Locale: Leicester
- Open: 1 July 1901
- Close: 9 November 1949
- Status: Closed

Infrastructure
- Track gauge: 1,435 mm (4 ft 8 1/2 in)
- Propulsion system: Electric
- Depots: Abbey Park Road, Narborough Road, London Road (Electric), Thurcaston Road (horse), Humberstone Gate (electric and horse)

Statistics
- Route length: 22.74 miles (36.60 km)

Leicester Corporation Tramways was a tramway system in Leicester, England from 1901 to 1949.

== History ==
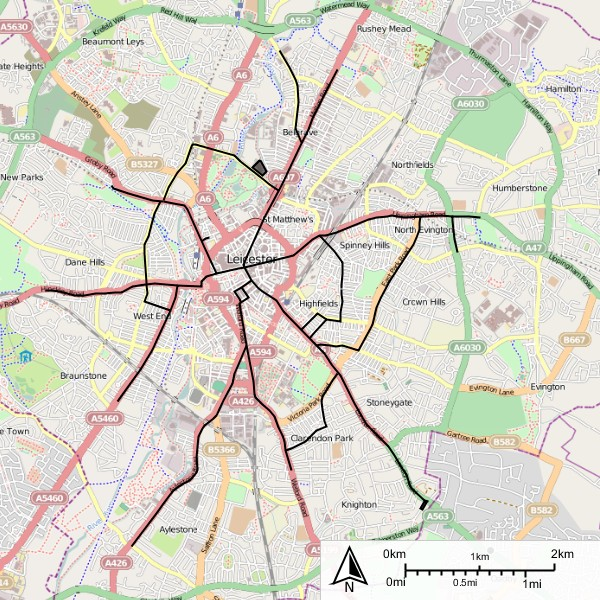
Map of Leicester Corporation Tramways

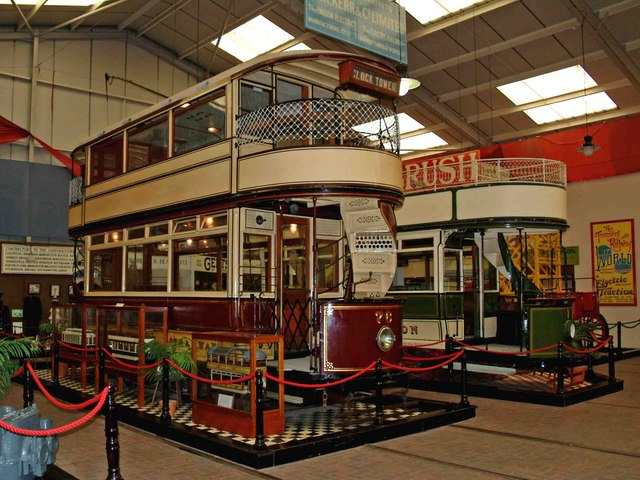
Tram number 76, held at the National Tramway Museum in Crich.

The first tramways in Leicester started horse-pulled operation in 1874, by the Leicester Tramways Company. The first route was from the Clock Tower to Belgrave. This was soon followed by lines to West Humberstone and to Victoria Park, which opened in 1875. 1878 saw further extensions, of the Victoria Park line along London Road to Knighton Road, and new arterial routes along Aylestone Road in the south, and to Woodgate in the north. In 1902 there were 403 horses and 76 vehicles which covered 948,525 miles, and carried 10,743,841 passengers bringing in £47,074 of revenue.

Leicester Corporation took over the tramways in 1901, under the Leicester Corporation Act 1897. The work to convert to electric traction started in April 1903. The work involved lowering the roadway under seven railway bridges by up to 2 feet (0.61 m) The track was relayed with rails from Hadfield’s Steel Foundry of 110 lbs per yard on the straight sections with the steepest gradient being 1 in 16, and the sharpest curve having a radius of 37 feet (11 m). Interlaced track was installed for short lengths on Belgrave Gate, Humberstone Road and Aylestone Road. The track was paved with granite setts from local quarries except in the centre of town where Jarrah and Karri hard wood blocks were used. The relaying cost in the region of £27,000. The first section of newly electrified route opened on 18 May 1904. The power station was erected on Belgrave Road by the canal which along with a tramway laid along Painter Street into the site, provided two options for the delivery of fuel. The main car depot was erected on a 4.5-acre site on Abbey Park Road comprising 3 tracks with accommodation for 56 cars. Altogether the new system cost £650,000 (equivalent to £68,330,000 in 2025).

The expansion in 1904 provided links to Highfields, Clarendon Park, Western Park, and Narborough Road. Further expansions took place from 1915 to 1927.

From the 1920s the Corporation Transport Department had run a motor bus service, and these started to replace trams in 1933. The last tram ran in 1949, on the Humberstone Road line. The main depot, at Abbey Park Road, continued in use as a bus depot by First Leicester, the successor to Leicester Corporation buses, until 2007 when a new depot opened on Abbey Lane. The site is to be redeveloped as flats. Another depot stood next to the Bell Hotel on Humberstone Gate.

== Network and routes ==
Section	Opened	Electrified	Closed
Clock Tower – Folly Inn, Belgrave	1874	1904	
Clock Tower – Humberstone Gate – Humberstone Road (Ash Street)	1875	1904	1949
Clock Tower – London Road – Victoria Park Road	1875	1904	1949
Victoria Park Road – Knighton Drive	1878	1904	
Aylestone Road	1878	1904	1947
Clock Tower – Churchgate – Woodgate	1878	1904	
London Road – Melbourne Road – Humberstone Road	1904		1933
Clock Tower – High Street – Braunston Circle	1904		
Braunston Circle – Hinckley Road – Western Park	1904		
Braunston Circle – Narborough Road	1904		
Hinckley Road – Fosse Road – Woodgate – Great Central Street – High Street	1904		
High Street – Groby Road	1904		
Belgrave Road – Melton Road	1905		
Fosse Road – Braunstone Gate	1915		
Clarendon Park – Welford Road – Aylestone Road	1922		
Groby Road – Blackbird Road – Abbey Park Road – Belgrave Road	1924		
Humberstone Road – Coleman Road	1927		1938
Humberstone Road – Uppingham Road – St Barnabas Road – East Park Road – Evington Road – London Road

Route numbers were introduced in 1932.

== Trams ==
From 1904 the tramway used a fleet of 99 double deck trams, supplemented by an additional 40 in 1905. Twenty new trams arrived in 1913/1914 for an experiment with "pay as you enter" boarding. The last new, numbers 161–178, came into service in 1920.

The National Tramway Museum holds tram No. 76, which was introduced in 1904 with electrification and stayed in use until 1947.

In 1950, twenty of the trams were sold and shipped from Birkenhead to Calcutta for service on the tramways there.

== Future ==
In April 2018, the Conservatives announced a policy proposal to revive the tram system should they win control of the city council at the 2019 local elections, similar to the nearby Nottingham Express Transit system, with work proposed to start in 2020. The proposal was criticised by the current mayor of Leicester, Peter Soulsby, who stated that studies exploring a revival of the tramway indicated that Leicester's geography was "unsuitable" for a modern tram network. In March 2019, plans were revealed for a tram network that would have 40 stops and be built in two phases.
