= City of Birmingham Tramways Company =

Tram operator in Birmingham, England (1896–1911)

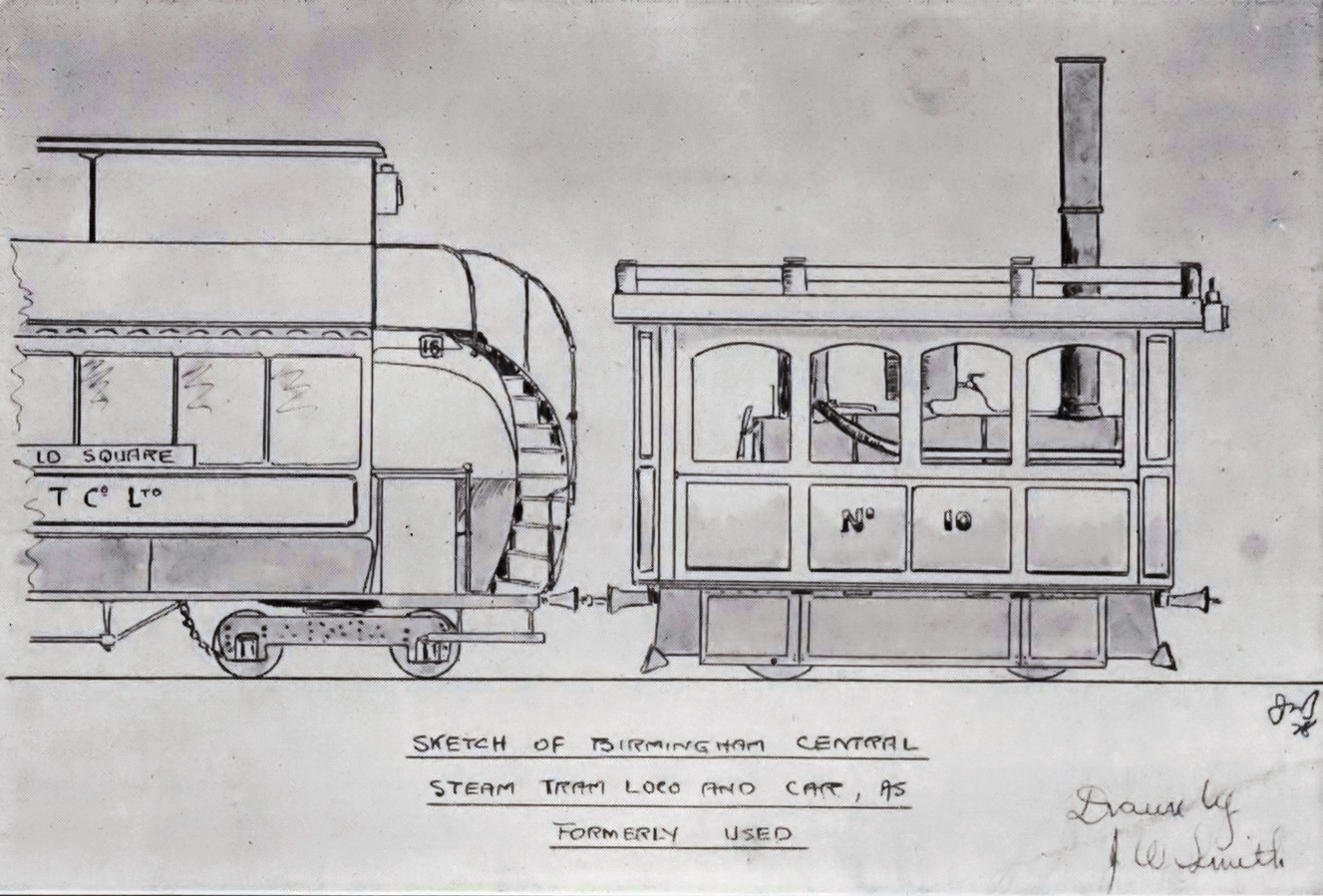
- Sketch of Birmingham Central Steam Tram

Operation
- Locale: Birmingham
- Open: 29 September 1896
- Close: 31 December 1911
- Status: Closed

Infrastructure
- Track gauge: 3 ft 6 in (1,067 mm)

Statistics
Birmingham and District Tramways Company era: 1872–1876
- Track gauge: 1,435 mm (4 ft 8 1/2 in) standard gauge
Birmingham Tramways and Omnibus Company era: 1876–1886
- Track gauge: 1,435 mm (4 ft 8 1/2 in) standard gauge
Birmingham Central Tramways Company era: 1884–1896
- Track gauge: 1,435 mm (4 ft 8 1/2 in) standard gauge
The City of Birmingham Tramways Company era: 1896–1911
- Track gauge: 1,435 mm (4 ft 8 1/2 in) standard gauge and 3 ft 6 in (1,067 mm)

The City of Birmingham Tramways Company Ltd operated trams in Birmingham, England, from 1896 until 1911.

The company was formed on 29 September 1896 by James Ross (President and Vice-President of the Toronto and Montreal Street Railway Co. of Canada) and Sir William Mackenzie to take over the business of the Birmingham Central Tramways Company Ltd.

The last routes in Birmingham closed on 31 December 1911. Most of its services were taken over by Birmingham Corporation Tramways.

== Historical overview ==
City of Birmingham Tramways Company Ltd was the result of a number of changes in ownership of the tramway franchises within the city of Birmingham since its creation in 1872 until 1911.

The Birmingham and District Tramways Company Ltd (BDTC) operated trams in Birmingham from 1872 until 1876. BDTC was acquired by the Birmingham Tramways and Omnibus Company Ltd (BTOC) in 1876.

BTOC in turn was taken over by the Birmingham Central Tramways Company Ltd (BCTC) in 1886. In 1896 the assets of the BCTC were acquired by the CBTC.

On 1 January 1907, some of CBTC’s Birmingham routes were taken over by BCT. On 1 January 1912 BCT took over the remainder of the company's routes, ownership of which had just passed from neighbouring local councils to Birmingham Corporation.

== Detailed history ==
=== Birmingham and District Tramways Company Ltd ===
Birmingham and Staffordshire Tramways Act 1870
- Act of Parliament
- Parliament of the United Kingdom
- Long title: An Act to authorise the Construction of Tramways from Birmingham in the county of Warwick to Handsworth, West Bromwich, and Tipton in the county of Stafford; and for other purposes.
- Citation: 33 & 34 Vict. c. clxviii

Dates
- Royal assent: 10 August 1870

Text of statute as originally enacted

Birmingham Tramways Act 1870
- Act of Parliament
- Parliament of the United Kingdom
- Long title: An Act to authorise the Construction of Street Tramways in certain parts of the Suburbs of Birmingham; and for other purposes.
- Citation: 33 & 34 Vict. c. clxxvii

Dates
- Royal assent: 10 August 1870

Text of statute as originally enacted

Birmingham Tramways Act 1873
- Act of Parliament
- Parliament of the United Kingdom
- Long title: An Act to extend the time for completion of Tramways authorised by "The Birmingham Tramways Act, 1870," to be constructed; and for other purposes.
- Citation: 36 & 37 Vict. c. xciii

Dates
- Royal assent: 7 July 1873

Text of statute as originally enacted

BDTC was the tramway company operating in Birmingham from 1872 until 1876.

The company was formed by William Busby and Daniel Busby in 1871 as an amalgamation of the Birmingham and Staffordshire Tramways Company Ltd and the Birmingham Tramways Company Ltd.

It built a standard gauge tramway line in 1872 from Hockley Brook to Dudley Port operated by horse trams. In 1873 the service was extended to the centre of Birmingham over the Birmingham Corporation tracks which were leased for £910 over seven years. The Birmingham Corporation tracks had cost £15,000 to build.

In 1874 the tramway between West Bromwich and Dudley Port was abandoned as the company was in financial difficulty.

The company was taken over by the Birmingham Tramways and Omnibus Company Ltd in 1876.

=== Birmingham Tramways and Omnibus Company Ltd ===
BTOC operated trams in Birmingham from 1876 until 1886.

It took over the business of the Birmingham and District Tramways Company Ltd and restricted the trams to a service between Birmingham and Handsworth, thus discontinuing the service through West Bromwich.

It was taken over by the BCTC in 1886.

=== Birmingham Central Tramways Company Ltd ===
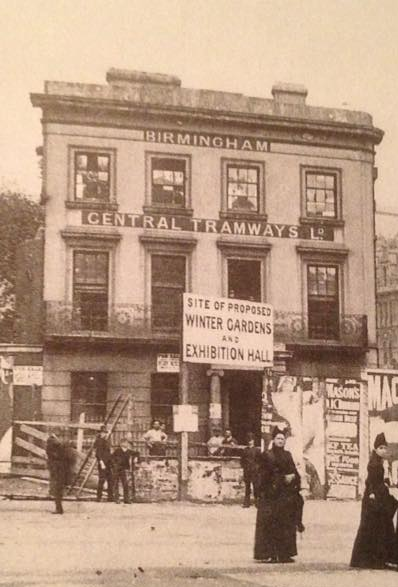
BCT's former office in Old Square, Birmingham, being prepared for demolition in 1891.

The BCTC operated trams in Birmingham from 1884 to 1896.

The company was formed in 1882, initially as the Birmingham Suburban Tramways Company but by the time of the opening of its first line, had been renamed the Birmingham Central Tramways Company Ltd.

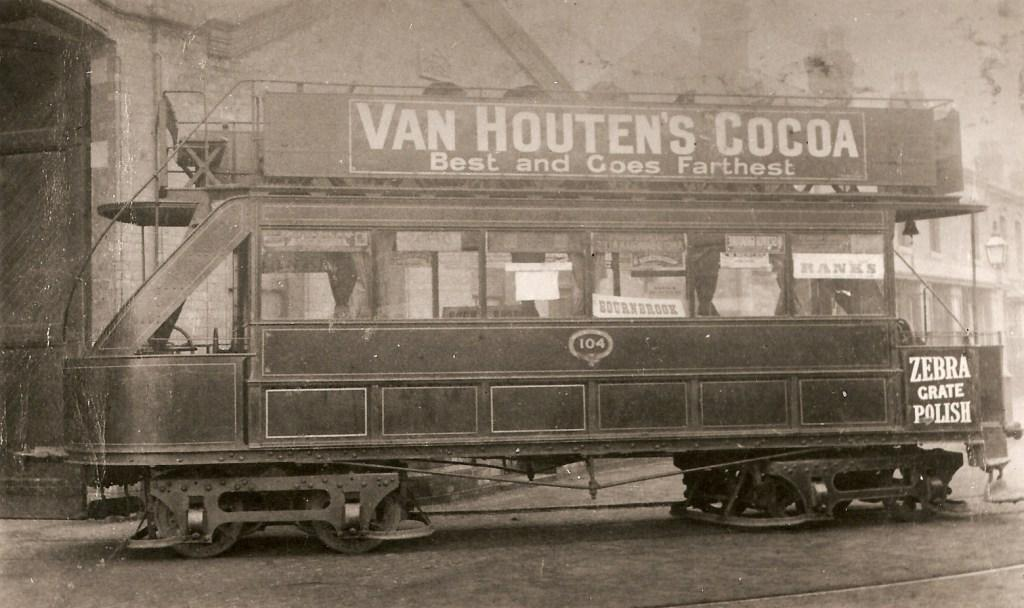
BCTC's Car No. 104 outside the tram shed in Dawlish Road, Bournbrook, in 1891. This vehicle survives, at the Black Country Living Museum.

The initial rolling stock consisted of 10 Falcon horse cars for the Nechells route, 14 Kitson steam tram locos and 13 Falcon trailer cars.

In 1886 they purchased the track of the BTOC, which lay outside the city boundary, and 18 horse cars. At the same time Birmingham Corporation leased the lines within the city to the Company.

Taken over by companies controlled by Scottish-Canadian businessman James Ross, on 24 March 1888, the horse tram route from Colmore Row to Hockley Brook was converted to cable traction by the Patent Cable Tramway Company, and on 20 April 1889, the line was extended to Handsworth (New Inns). The service was operated with open-top double-decker cars.

In October 1889 the portion of the acquired tramway along Bristol Road to Bournbrook was closed for reconstruction. It re-opened on 24 July 1890 and was worked by Nos. 101-112, Falcon battery-electric (accumulator) open-top double-deck cars.

On 29 September 1896 the assets of the BCTC were acquired by the City of Birmingham Tramways Company Ltd.

=== The City of Birmingham Tramways Company Ltd ===
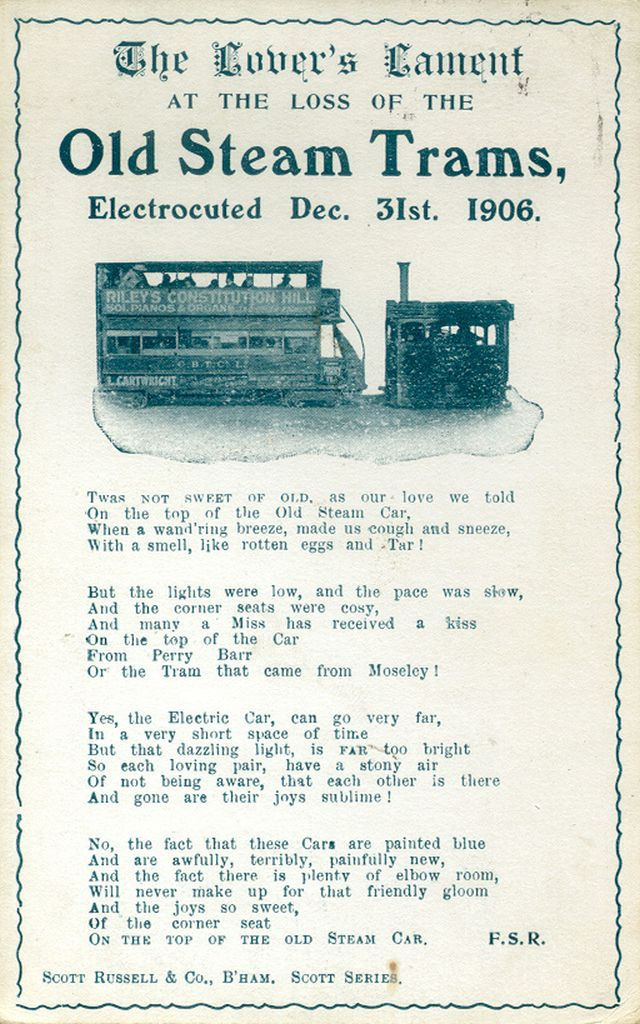
Postcard commemorating the ending of steam tram operations, on the last day of 1906

The CBTC operated trams in Birmingham from 1896 until 1911.

The company was formed on 29 September 1896 by James Ross and William Mackenzie to take over the business of the BCTC.

From 14 May 1901 the route from the city to Bournbrook via Bristol Road (later extended to Selly Oak) was operated by electric cars using overhead current supply. Other routes were soon electrified and the company became a British Electric Traction subsidiary in 1902.

On 30 June 1902 the company took over the routes of the Birmingham and Aston Tramways Company which were now owned by Aston Manor Urban District Council. By this date the CBTC were operating 21 overhead electric trams, 54 cable trams, 89 steam engines, 76 double decker steam trams, 10 horse cars, 45 horse buses and 608 horses on tracks mostly constructed and owned by Birmingham Corporation.

The last routes in Birmingham closed on 31 December 1911. Most of its services were taken over by Birmingham Corporation Tramways.

== See also ==
- 1907 Birmingham Tramway accident
