= Stockton and Darlington Steam Tramway Company =

Tramway operator in England

Stockton and Darlington Steam Tramways Company

Operation
- Locale: Two separate systems one in Stockton-on-Tees and the other in Darlington

Statistics
Stockton and Darlington Steam Tramways Company era: 17 November 1881–1893
- Routes: Stockton-on-Tees
- Track gauge: 4 ft (1,219 mm)
- Propulsion system: Steam
- Route length: 6.28 miles (10.11 km)
Stockton and Darlington Steam Tramways Company era: 10 October 1880
- Routes: Darlington
- Track gauge: 3 ft (914 mm)
- Propulsion system: Horse

The Stockton and Darlington Steam Tramways Company operated two separate tramway concerns in the North East of England. The first was a horse-drawn tramway service in Darlington from 1880 to 1904, and the second was a steam tramway in Stockton-on-Tees between 1881 and 1893.

== Darlington operation ==
The Darlington horse-drawn tramway opened on 10 October 1880. It operated until the Darlington Corporation acquired the concern for modernisation under the control of the Darlington Corporation Light Railways. The price paid for this was £7,600. The lines were leased to C. J. O'Dowd who continued to operate them until 18 August 1903, when the service was withdrawn for reconstruction.

== Stockton on Tees operation ==
The company built a 4 ft (1,219 mm) gauge route around 3.25 miles in length between the village of Norton and the district of South Stockton, via Norton Road, High Street (Stockton), Bridge Road and the Harewood Arms on Mandale Road.

Subsequent extensions were made, one from the south end of Stockton High Street, by the Grey Horse Hotel, along Yarm Lane to St. Peter's Church, Yarm Road, and the second along Bishopton Lane to near Stockton railway station.

Six Merryweather & Sons steam locomotives of 1881 provided the services.

The company was purchased by the Stockton and District Tramways Company in 1893.
