= Stockton and District Tramways Company =

Tramway operator in England

Operation
- Locale: Stockton-on-Tees – Norton
- Open: 1881
- Close: 1896
- Status: Closed

Infrastructure
- Track gauge: 4 ft (1,219 mm)
- Propulsion system: Steam

Statistics
- Route length: 6.28 miles (10.11 km)

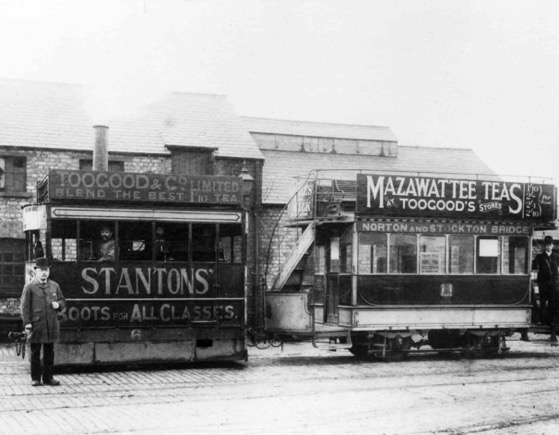
Steam tram No. 6, built by Merryweather in 1881

The Stockton and District Tramways Company operated a steam tramway service between Stockton-on-Tees and Norton between 1881 and 1896.

== History ==
The Stockton and District Tramways Company was a short lived tramway operator, surviving for only three years. In 1893 it took over the services operated by the Stockton and Darlington Steam Tramway Company which had run into financial difficulty.

== Closure ==
It was unable to make the tramway pay and in 1896 it sold out to the Imperial Tramways Company. Steam services continued for a few months until the route was closed for modernisation, to later re-open as the Middlesbrough, Stockton and Thornaby Electric Tramways Company.
