= Dudley, Sedgley and Wolverhampton Tramways Company =

Historic Tram operator

Dudley, Sedgley and Wolverhampton Tramways
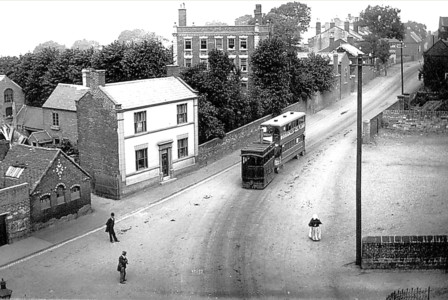
- Steam tram in Sedgley (before 24 August 1901)

Operation
- Locale: Dudley, Sedgley, Wolverhampton
- Open: 7 May 1883
- Close: 1901
- Status: Closed

Infrastructure
- Track gauge: 1,435 mm (4 ft 8 1/2 in) standard gauge
- Propulsion system: Steam
- Depots: The Depot, Sedgley

Statistics
- Route length: 5 miles (8.0 km)
Dudley, Sedgley and Wolverhampton Tramways Company era: 1879–1888
- Track gauge: 1,435 mm (4 ft 8 1/2 in) standard gauge
Midland Tramways Company era: 1888–1893
- Track gauge: 1,435 mm (4 ft 8 1/2 in) standard gauge
Dudley and Wolverhampton Tramways Company era: 1893–1898
- Track gauge: 1,435 mm (4 ft 8 1/2 in) standard gauge
Wolverhampton and District Electric Tramways Limited era: 1898–1901
- Track gauge: 1,435 mm (4 ft 8 1/2 in) standard gauge

The Dudley, Sedgley and Wolverhampton Tramway Company operated a tramway service between Wolverhampton and Dudley from 1883 to 1901.

== History ==
In 1879 the Dudley, Sedgley and Wolverhampton Tramways Company Limited was formed and given powers in the Dudley, Sedgley and Wolverhampton Tramways Order 1880 under the Tramways Confirmation (No. 1) Act 1880 to build and operate the tramway between the places named in its title.

The contractors Green and Burleigh of London were appointed and construction started in Wolverhampton on 23 August 1881 and by July 1882 the line was completed as far as Sedgley. Although steam operation was envisaged from the outset, the company did not receive permission from the Board of Trade.

The company built its offices behind the Public Hall in Sedgley, where they erected a superintendent's office, board room, and shed for housing the tram cars. They also secured stabling on the premises of the late firm of Eliza Tinsley and Co.

A trial trip was taken over the line on 4 December 1882. Major General Charles Scrope Hutchinson inspected the line in December 1882 but improvements were required so services did not start until 7 May 1883. At this point they were horse-drawn, with three horses being required per tramcar to cope with steep gradients. The company was fined £5 in August 1885 for using seven tramcars when it only has a licence to operate four.

The operation was not commercially successful, and in 1884 the company applied to the Board of Trade to operate steam tramway locomotives. The Dudley, Sedgley and Wolverhampton Tramways Order 1884 granted permission but required the widening of the roadway on two narrow sections of route. Modifications to the track were also required so services were suspended from 8 November 1885. The horses were sold at auction on 23 November 1885.

The company purchased steam trams from Kitson and Company with double deck trailers from Starbuck Car and Wagon Company. The livery was maroon, picked out in gold, with yellow window frames.

Major General Charles Scrope Hutchinson inspected the line again on 1 January 1886. It re-opened on 4 January 1886 and although the financial position of the company improved slightly it still was not a viable business, and was sold in March 1888 to Mr. E. D. Oppert and Mr. J. Fell who operated it as the Midland Tramways Company Ltd. The new owners could also not make the business pay, and it was reformed as the Dudley and Wolverhampton Tramways Company Limited in 1893.

This new company passed into the control of the British Electric Traction company in 1898 for less than £20,000. In February 1901 a new company was formed, the Wolverhampton and District Electric Tramways Limited. and the final steam service ran later that month.
