= Birmingham and Aston Tramways Company =

Tramway operator in England

Operation
- Locale: Birmingham, Aston
- Open: 26 December 1882
- Close: 30 June 1902
- Status: Closed

Infrastructure
- Track gauge: 3 ft 6 in (1,067 mm)
- Propulsion system: Steam
- Depot: Witton

Statistics
- Route length: 3.83 miles (6.16 km)

The Birmingham and Aston Tramways Company operated a steam-powered tramway service in Birmingham and Aston between 1882 and 1902.

== History ==
The Birmingham and Aston Tramways Order 1880 approved the construction of the first steam tramway in Birmingham which duly opened on 26 December 1882.

It ran from Aston Street in the centre of Birmingham via Aston Cross and then followed two routes to Witton, one via Park Road and Witton Lane and the other along Lichfield Road and Church Lane.

On 23 February 1885 a branch line to the foot of Gravelly Hill from Lichfield Road was opened.

== Fleet ==
The rolling stock comprised steam locomotive engines in a crimson livery and Starbuck Car and Wagon Company double-deck trailer cars in cream. The locomotive fleet comprised acquisitions as follows:

- 1 Kitson and Company 1882
- 2-6 Kitson and Company 1883
- 7-8 Wilkinson 1883
- 9-12 Kitson and Company 1883
- 13-16 Kitson and Company 1885
- 17-27 Kitson and Company 1886

== Parameters ==
- Gauge: 1,067 mm (3 ft 6 in)
- Voltage:

== Closure ==
Aston Manor Urban District Council purchased the part of the tramway within their boundary on 30 June 1902 with the remaining section going to Birmingham Corporation on 1 January 1904. Aston Manor Urban District Council leased it back to the City of Birmingham Tramways Company.
