= Gloucester Tramways Company =

Tramway in Gloucester, England (1879–1904)

Operation
- Locale: Gloucester
- Open: 26 May 1879
- Close: 17 March 1904
- Status: Closed

Infrastructure
- Track gauge: 4 ft (1,219 mm)
- Propulsion system: Horse

Statistics
- Route length: 3.4 miles (5.5 km)

Gloucester Tramways Company operated a horse-drawn tramway service in Gloucester between 1879 and 1904.

== History ==
In 1877, the Gloucester Tramways Company submitted proposals for a system to the city council. Gloucester Tramways Company was a subsidiary of the Imperial Tramways Company. The company obtained an order under the Tramways Act 1870 on 8 April 1878.

Track laying started on 16 September 1878. By 24 May 1879, the system was ready for inspection by the Railway Inspector, Colonel Hutchinson.

The depots were located off Bristol Road at its junction with Lysons Road at SO 8256 1717, and off India Road at SO 8414 1776.

== Services ==
The company provided services on three routes:

- The Fleece in at Wotton along London Road, Northgate Street to The Cross, then Southgate Street to Theresa Place on Bristol Road.
- St. Nicholas Church in Westgate Street to The Cross, then Eastgate Street, Lower Barton Street to India Road.
- Kingsholm on Denmark Road, via Northgate Street to The Cross, then to The Royal Infirmary on Southgate Street.

== Closure ==
On 30 September 1902 the corporation bought out the tramways company. The purchase price was finally agreed at £26,000 (equivalent to £2,760,000 in 2025).

The sale included the India Road and Bristol Road depots, 100 horses, 14 tram cars, 8 horse buses, and 6 charabancs.

The council established a new company, Gloucester Corporation Tramways, for the purpose of modernising the tramway.
