= Rochdale Corporation Tramways =

Tramway operator in England

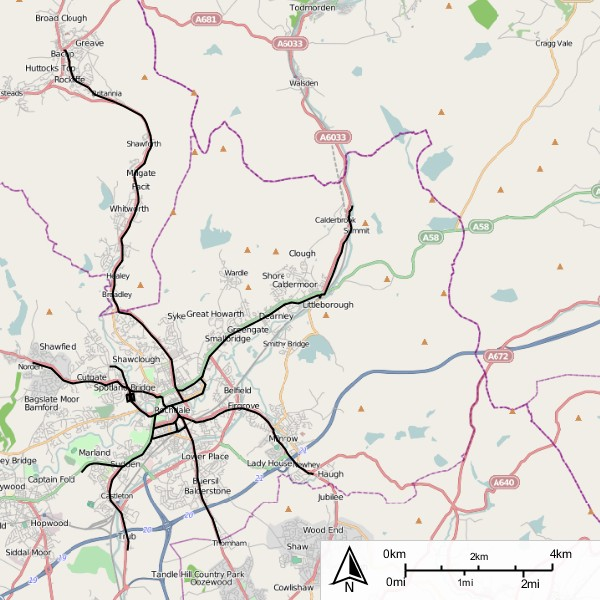
- Map of Rochdale Corporation Tramways

Operation
- Locale: Rochdale
- Open: 22 May 1902
- Close: 12 November 1932
- Status: Closed

Infrastructure
- Track gauge: 4 ft 8 1/2 in (1,435 mm)
- Propulsion system: Electric

Statistics
- Route length: 28.71 miles (46.20 km)

Rochdale Corporation Tramways operated an electric tramway service in Rochdale between 1902 and 1932.

== History ==
In 1898, Rochdale Town Council adopted a resolution in favour of acquiring the steam tramways operated by the Manchester, Bury, Rochdale and Oldham Steam Tramways Company, which had operated services in Rochdale since 1 November 1883.

The Rochdale Corporation Act 1900 included proposals for new tramways. Construction started on 15 June 1901, and the first line was inspected on 15 May 1902 and opened one week later.

Eventually the number of routes expanded, to Bacup, Norden, Castleton, Newhey and Todmorden.

In 1925 the corporation bought the Middleton Electric Tramways Company for £79,000. The line was shared between Manchester Corporation and Oldham Corporation. The tram routes merged into Rochdale Corporation's network of services which offered the capability of through services to Manchester.

== Fleet ==
The company bought 94 passenger cars, and a water car. Five further cars were obtained second hand from the Middleton Company.

== Closure ==
The whole system was closed on 12 November 1932.
