= Preston Corporation Tramways =

Former tramway in Lancashire, England

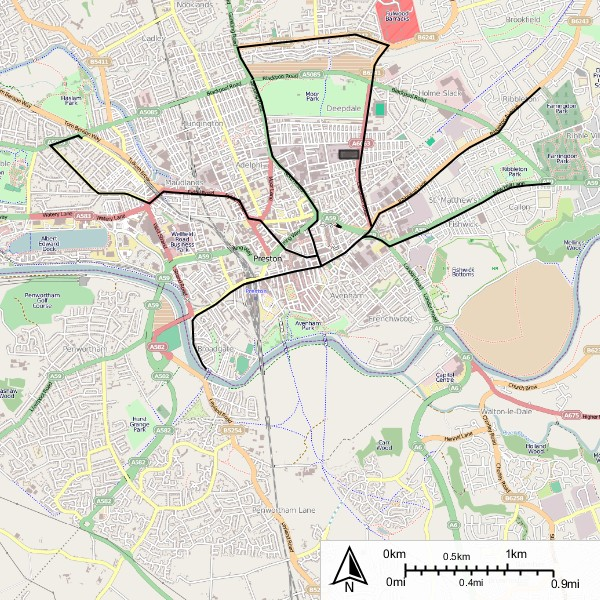
- Map of Preston Corporation Tramways

Operation
- Locale: Preston, Lancashire
- Open: 31 December 1886
- Close: 15 December 1935
- Status: Closed

Infrastructure
- Track gauge: 1,435 mm (4 ft 8 1/2 in)
- Propulsion system: Electric

Statistics
- Route length: 10.53 miles (16.95 km)

Preston Corporation Tramways operated a tramway service in Preston, Lancashire, between 1886 and 1934.

== History ==
Preston Council bought out the operation of the horse drawn Preston Tramways Company on 31 December 1886.

Electrification resulted in the first modernised route opening on 7 June 1904. Routes extended to Penwortham Bridge, Ashton-on-Ribble, Ribbleton and Farringdon Park, and there was also a circular route via Fulwood.

== Closure ==
The system closed on 15 December 1935.

== Reinstatement ==
In 2010, Preston Trampower proposed to reinstate trams in Preston by building a new tramline from Preston railway station to Redscar Business Park. The scheme, known as the Guild Line, was planned for opening in 2019.
