= Chester Tramways Company =

Horse-drawn tramway service in England

Operation
- Locale: Chester
- Open: 10 June 1878
- Close: 1 January 1902
- Status: Closed

Infrastructure
- Track gauge: 1,435 mm (4 ft 8 1/2 in)
- Propulsion system: Horse

Statistics
- Route length: 2.38 miles (3.83 km)

Chester Tramways Company operated a horse-drawn tramway service in Chester between 1878 and 1901.

== History ==
Chester Tramways Act 1878
- Act of Parliament
- Parliament of the United Kingdom
- Long title: An Act incorporation the Chester Tramways Company, and for empowering them to construct Tramways in the city of Chester; and for other purposes.
- Citation: 41 & 42 Vict. c. clxxiv

Dates
- Royal assent: 22 July 1878

Other legislation
- Repealed by: Cheshire County Council Act 1980

Status: Repealed

Text of statute as originally enacted

The Chester Tramways Company was incorporated by the Chester Tramways Act 1878 (41 & 42 Vict. c. clxxiv) with powers to construct a standard-gauge 2 miles 30 chains (3.8 km) tramway from the General Station to Curzon Street in Saltney. Construction started in 1878 and on 28 May 1879 the route was inspected by Major General Charles Scrope Hutchinson R.E. of the Board of Trade and declared fit for operation.

Services started on 10 June 1878 with a route from Chester railway station and the Castle. This was extended to Curzon Street, Saltney on 21 June 1879. The initial purchase of 8 Eades Patent Reversible tramcars was soon found unsatisfactory, and these were replaced by eight cars constructed locally by Mr Kerneen. The fleet increased slightly over the years, and eventually numbered eleven tramcars.

The company was required by the Chester Tramways Act 1878 (41 & 42 Vict. c. clxxiv), to pay to the Dee Bridge Commissioners an annual sum for the use of Grosvenor Bridge. The Chester Improvement Act 1884 gave the company the option of either contributing £1,000 towards freeing the tolls, or paying £85 per annum to Chester Corporation until 1899 The fares were set at 3d (equivalent to £1.29 in 2025) inside or 2d outside irrespective of distance, but the inside fare was reduced to 2d (equivalent to £0.93 in 2025) once the bridge toll was abolished on 1 January 1885.

The tramway company sold car number 5 to Hughes & Lancaster who converted it to run on compressed air and tested it on the streets of Chester, but it did not prove satisfactory.

The operation of the tramway was not initially an overwhelming commercial success. In addition to the tramway it also operated a fleet of 19 horse buses. This required the company to maintain a stable of 76 horses, each with an average life of around 6 years. The average price of a horse was £33 (equivalent to £3,700 in 2025). A permanent staff of six men and a boy were employed just to look after the horses. The financial position changed around 1885 when John Gardner was appointed manager and the company managed to pay a dividend to the shareholders.

== Notable people ==
=== General Managers ===
- T.E.J. Lloyd 1878 - 1885
- John Gardner 1885 (formerly employed by Liverpool United Tramways) - 1901

== Closure ==
Under the Chester Corporation Act 1901, the council took up its option to purchase the assets of the company. It did this for a cost of £18,000 (equivalent to £1,912,859 in 2025), and services continued as Chester Corporation Tramways.
