= Ipswich Tramways =

Tramway operator in England

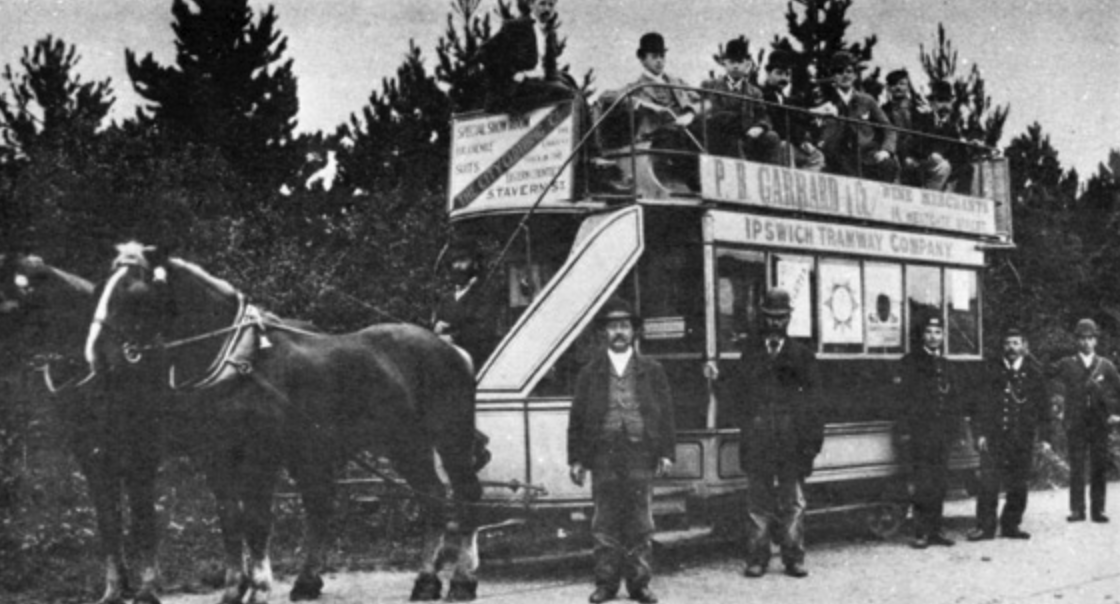
- Horsecar No. 3 outside Derby Road Station

Operation
- Locale: Ipswich
- Open: 13 October 1880
- Close: 6 June 1903
- Status: Closed

Infrastructure
- Track gauge: 3 ft 6 in (1,067 mm)
- Propulsion system: Horse

Statistics
- Route length: 4.25 miles (6.84 km)

Ipswich Tramways operated a horse-drawn tramway service in Ipswich between 1880 and 1903.

== History ==
Ipswich's horse tramway started services on 13 October 1880 from a depot located at the junction of Quadling Street and New Cardinal Street. It was operated and owned by Simon Armstrong Graham. The line ran from Cornhill in the town centre, via Princes Street, to Ipswich railway station. There was a branch line to Brooks Hall, via Portman Road and Norwich Road.

Ipswich Tramways Act 1881
- Act of Parliament
- Parliament of the United Kingdom
- Long title: An Act to incorporate the Ipswich Tramways Company, and to authorise the acquisition by them of Tramways in the borough of Ipswich, and to empower them to construct new Tramways; and for other purposes.
- Citation: 44 & 45 Vict. c. cix

Dates
- Royal assent: 18 July 1881

Text of statute as originally enacted

The Ipswich Tramways Company took ownership in 1881, under the Ipswich Tramways Act 1881 (44 & 45 Vict. c. cix). An extension to the system was constructed between Cornhill and Brooks Hall, via Westgate Street and St Matthews Street. In 1884 there was a further extension from Cornhill to Derby Road railway station.

== Closure ==
The company was bought by Ipswich Corporation on 1 November 1901 who modernised and electrified the service and it restructured the organisation as Ipswich Corporation Tramways on 23 November 1903.
