= Neath and District Tramways Company =

Tramway operator in Wales

Neath Corporation Tramways

Operation
- Locale: Neath
- Open: 1875
- Close: 1897
- Status: Closed

Infrastructure
- Track gauge: 1,435 mm (4 ft 8 1/2 in)
- Propulsion system: Horse

Statistics
- Route length: 4.03 miles (6.49 km)

Neath and District Tramways Company operated a tramway service in Neath between 1875 and 1897.

== History ==
Neath and District Tramways Company began operating horse-drawn tramway services in Neath in 1875.

== Closure ==
Neath Corporation took over the tramway in 1897 and formed Neath Corporation Tramways to modernise the service.
