= Leicester Tramways Company =

English transport company

Operation
- Locale: Leicester
- Open: 1874
- Close: 1901
- Status: Closed

Infrastructure
- Track gauge: 1,435 mm (4 ft 8 1/2 in)
- Propulsion system: Horse-drawn
- Depot: 178 Belgrave Gate

Statistics
- Route length: 12.06 miles (19.41 km)

The Leicester Tramways Company operated a horse-drawn tramway service in Leicester from 1874 to 1901.

== History ==
The Leicester Tramways Company was incorporated by the Leicester Tramways Order 1873 under the Tramways Act 1870 (33 & 34 Vict. c. 78) with power to raise capital of £40,000. The company employed the well-regarded engineer Joseph Kincaid and entered into an agreement with William Turton to construct the tramways at a cost of £32,500 (equivalent to £4,240,000 in 2025).

Construction was slower than expected and once the directors had received 3 of their cars, a trial trip was carried out on the first line on 23 December 1874 from the Clock Tower to the Folly Inn in Belgrave. Public services started the following day, 24 December 1874 with a flat fare of 2d.

The line to Humberstone opened on 22 March 1875 and the London Road section was opened on 13 August 1875. This completed the network that the company was originally authorised to construct.

In 1876 the company attempted a trial of a Hughes steam locomotive built at the Falcon works at Loughborough. However, the company did not progress with this beyond the trial and retained horse power for the rest of the life of the company.

In 1878 there were further extensions of the Victoria Park line for 1 mile along London Road to Knighton Lane, and new arterial routes along Welford Road and Aylestone Road to Grace Road on 7 June 1878, and along Church Gate, Sanvey Gate and Woodgate to Groby Road on 20 August 1878.

The company was purchased on 31 December 1901 by Leicester Corporation for the sum of £134,110 (equivalent to £14,250,000 in 2025) and they set up Leicester Corporation Tramways to electrify and extend the system.
