= Scarborough Tramways Company =

Defunct electric tramway company

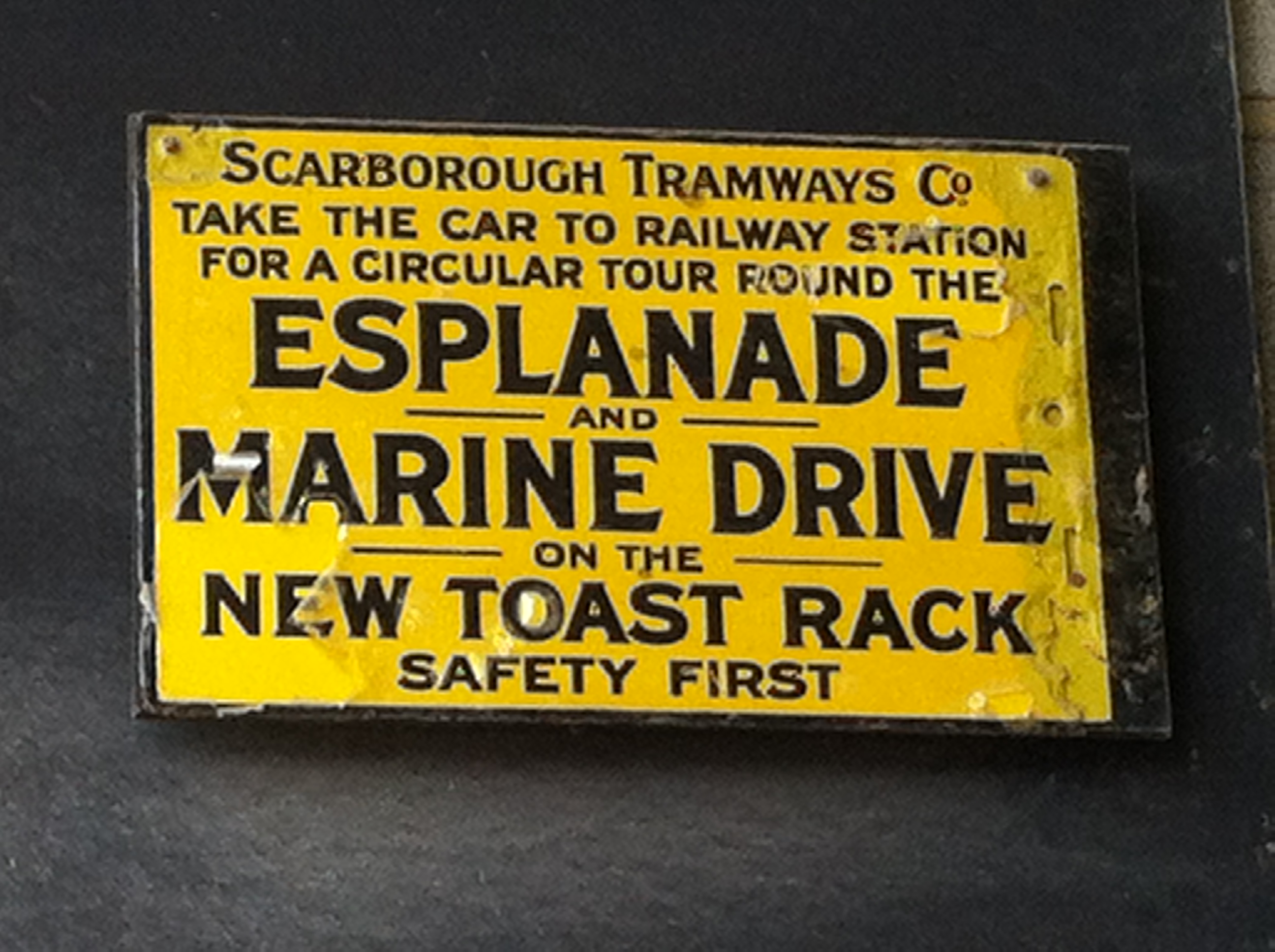
- Scarborough Tramways Company sign at the National Tramway Museum

Operation
- Locale: Scarborough, North Yorkshire
- Open: 6 May 1904
- Close: 30 September 1931
- Status: Closed

Infrastructure
- Track gauge: 3 ft 6 in (1,067 mm)
- Propulsion system: Electric
- Depot: Scalby Road

Statistics
- Route length: 4.59 miles (7.39 km)

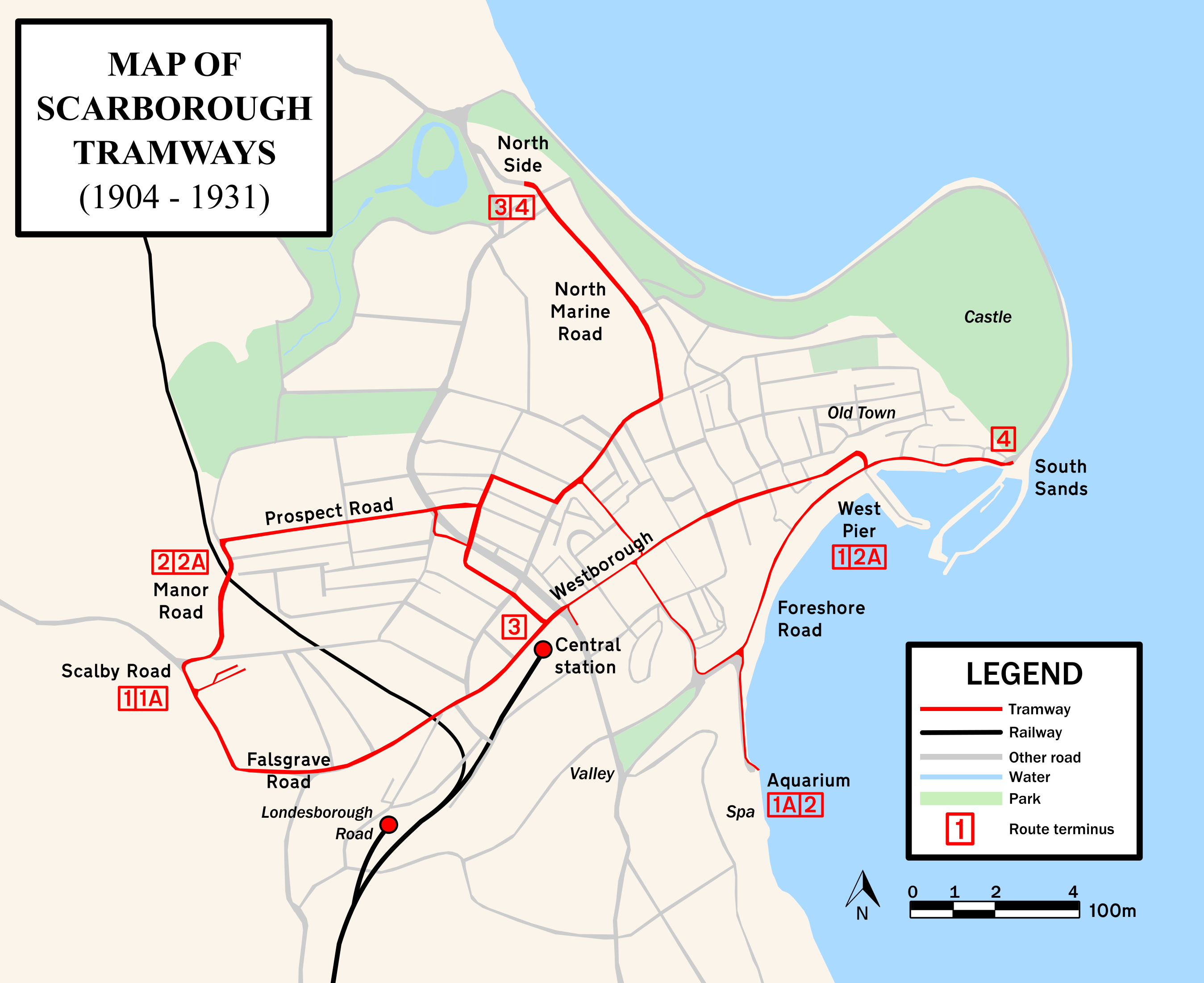
System map

The Scarborough Tramways Company was a transport company that provided an electric tramway service in Scarborough, North Yorkshire, England, between 1904 and 1931.

== History ==
Scarborough Tramways Act 1902
- Act of Parliament
- Parliament of the United Kingdom
- Long title: An Act to incorporate the Scarborough Tramways Company and to empower that Company to make and maintain tramways and to execute certain street works in the borough of Scarborough and for other purposes.
- Citation: 2 Edw. 7. c. lx

Dates
- Royal assent: 28 April 1902

Scarborough Corporation obtained legal powers under the Scarborough Tramways Act 1902 (2 Edw. 7. c. lx) to operate tramways in the town. The Scarborough Tramways Company was formed under this act to build and work the tramways.

The main contractor for construction was the parent company, Edmundsons Electricity Corporation, and the general layout of the system was to the design of Mr. Swinton, with Mr. Waler as consultant engineer. The tramways were laid with 6 inch grooved 45 foot girder rails weighing 90 pounds per yard, supplied by the North Eastern Steel Company of Middlesbrough, with points and crossings manufactured by Hadfields Limited of Sheffield. The contract for the overhead work was awarded to Robert W. Blackwell and Company of London.

The power for the system was obtained from Edmundsons Electricity Corporation from their town power station off Seamer Road.

The car depot was located off Scalby Road at TA 0308 8820.

Construction began on 12 October 1903 and was complete by the following May. After an inspection by Colonel Pelham von Donop on 4 May 1904, the system was opened to the public on 6 May 1904.

The costs of construction, including an extension to the power station, was £96,000 (equivalent to £10,100,000 in 2025).

== Fleet ==
The initial 22 tramcars were built by Brush Electrical Machines.

- 1–15 delivered in May 1904
- 16–18 delivered later in 1904
- 19–22 delivered in 1905

Five further cars and one spare car body were obtained second hand from Ipswich Corporation Tramways. One was numbered 21, to replace the original 21 destroyed in the accident on 16 September 1925. The remaining cars were numbered 23 – 25

== Routes ==
After a rationalisation in 1906, the company operated 6 routes as follows:

- Route 1 – West Pier to Scalby Road via Foreshore Road, Vernon Place, and Falsgrave Road (returning via Prospect Road, Hanover Road, Westborough and Eastborough). 1.9 miles.
- Route 1A – Aquarium to Scalby Road via Eastborough, Newborough, Westborough and Falsgrave Road (returning via Prospect Road, Hanover Road and Vernon Place). 1.7 miles.
- Route 2 – Aquarium to Manor Road via Eastborough, Newborough, Westborough, Hanover Road, and Prospect Road (returning via Scalby Road, Falsgrave Road and Vernon Place). 2.25 miles.
- Route 2A – West Pier to Manor Road via Foreshore Road, Vernon Place, Hanover Road, and Prospect Road (returning via Scalby Road, Falsgrave Road, Westborough, Newborough and Eastborough). 2.12 miles
- Route 3 – Railway Station and North Side via Westborough, Aberdeen Walk, Castle Road and North Marine Road. 1.2 miles
- Route 4 – South Sands (Marine Drive South Toll House) and North Side via Sandside, Foreshore Road, Vernon Place, Aberdeen Walk, Castle Road, and North Marine Road. 1.9 miles.

== Closure ==
The system was bought by Scarborough Corporation and closed on 30 September 1931, to be replaced by omnibuses.
