= Middlesbrough Corporation Tramways =

English tram company, 1921–1934

Operation
- Locale: Middlesbrough
- Open: 3 April 1921
- Close: 9 June 1934
- Status: Closed

Infrastructure
- Track gauge: 3 ft 7 in (1,093 mm)
- Propulsion system: Electric
- Depot: Parliament Road

Statistics
- Route length: 5.49 miles (8.84 km)

Middlesbrough Corporation Tramways operated an electric tramway service in Middlesbrough between 1921 and 1934.

== History ==
On 4 April 1921 Middlesbrough Corporation Tramways took over operation of the Middlesbrough, Stockton and Thornaby Electric Tramways Company services provided by the Imperial Tramways Company.

The fleet comprised 31 tramcars operated jointly with Stockton and Thornaby Corporations between North Ormesby and Norton Green, and between the Middlesbrough Transporter Bridge and Linthorpe.

In the first two years of operation, 9 new double-deck tramcars were purchased, the single deck trams were re-equipped, and there was a programme of track doubling and renewals.

A depot of 14,250 sq yds was built in Parliament Road, and formally opened on 19 July 1921 by the chairman of the council Tramways Committee, Councillor Edwin Turner.

== Closure ==
Bus services gradually replaced tram service from around 1926. In 1933 the company name changed to Middlesbrough Corporation Transport and the last tram ran on 9 June 1934. Following closure, four of the double decked vehicles built by Hurst Nelson in 1921 were sold to Southend-on-Sea Corporation Tramways, where they had to be regauged to run on the 3 ft 6 in (1,067 mm) gauge tracks. They only lasted for another 5 years, being scrapped in 1939.

== Bibliography ==
- Harley, Robert J (1994). Southend-on-Sea Tramways. Middleton Press. ISBN 978-1-873793-28-2.
