= Neath Corporation Tramways =

Tramway operator in Wales

Operation
- Locale: Neath
- Open: 1897
- Close: 8 August 1920
- Status: Closed

Infrastructure
- Track gauge: 1,435 mm (4 ft 8 1/2 in)
- Propulsion system: Gas

Statistics
- Route length: 4.03 miles (6.49 km)

Neath Corporation Tramways operated a tramway service in Neath between 1897 and 1920.

== History ==
Neath Corporation took over the tramway services previously provided by the Neath and District Tramways Company. Unlike other local authority tramway modernisation programmes, Neath Corporation opted for town gas powered tramcars, the British Gas Traction Company supplied the tramcars, which stored town gas under compression in cylinders.

British Gas Traction Company was a subsidiary of Luhrig Company, and obtained the gas engines from Gasmotoren-Fabrik Deutz of Köln. The tramcars were manufactured under licence by the Lancaster Railway Carriage and Wagon Company.

The track was relayed by Krauss of Bristol, starting in March 1898.

On 29 August 1899 the inspector from the Board of Trade, Colonel Sir Francis Marindin passed the system for public usage.

After encountering financial difficulties, the line was leased to the Neath Gas Traction Company, which changed its name in 1902 to the Provincial Gas Traction Company.

== Closure ==
Further financial difficulties in the First World War resulted in the corporation taking direct control, and it was closed in the face of motor bus competition in 1920.

Tramcar number 1 is preserved at the Cefn Coed Colliery Museum.
