= Paisley District Tramways Company =

Tramway operator in Scotland

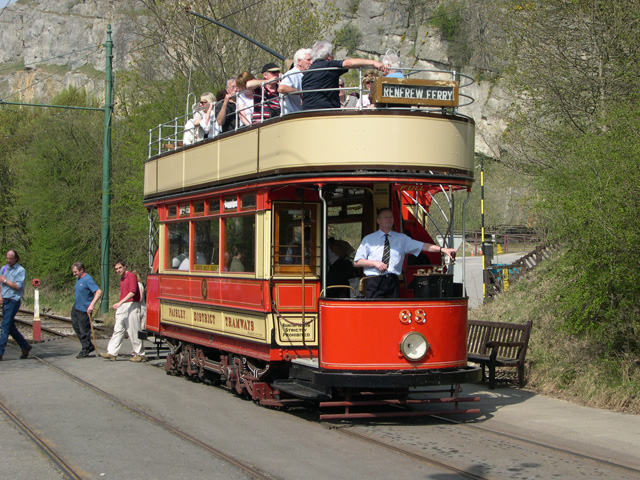
- Tramcar 68 from 1919 at the National Tramway Museum

Operation
- Locale: Paisley
- Open: 17 September 1903
- Close: 1 August 1924
- Status: Closed

Infrastructure
- Track gauge: 4 ft 7 3/4 in (1,416 mm)
- Propulsion system: Electric

Statistics
- Route length: 18.75 miles (30.18 km)

Paisley District Tramways Company operated a tramway service in Paisley between 1903 and 1923.

== History ==
Paisley District Tramways Company took over the Paisley Tramways Company on 17 September 1903 and undertook a programme of modernisation and electrification. The first electric tramway services started on 13 June 1904.

There were depots at:

- Aurs Road, Barrhead
- Main Road, Elderslie
- Paisley Road, Renfrew

== Takeover ==
The company was taken over by Glasgow Corporation Tramways on 1 August 1923, which continued to operate trams in Paisley until the late 1950s.

Paisley 68 survived and became Glasgow 1068; it is preserved at the National Tramway Museum in Crich, Derbyshire. Paisley 17 (Glasgow 1017) also survived and runs at the Summerlee Museum of Scottish Industrial Life in Coatbridge, North Lanarkshire.
