= Paisley Tramways Company =

Transport company in Paisley, Scotland

Operation
- Locale: Paisley
- Open: 30 December 1885
- Close: 17 September 1903
- Status: Closed

Infrastructure
- Track gauge: 4 ft 7 3/4 in (1,416 mm)
- Propulsion system: Horse

Statistics
- Route length: 2.44 miles (3.93 km)

Paisley Tramways Company operated a tramway service in Paisley, Scotland between 1885 and 1903.

== History ==
The Paisley Tramways Order 1885, which was ratified by the Tramways Orders Confirmation (No. 2) Act 1885 (48 & 49 Vict. c. cii), authorised construction of this tramway in Paisley, and the Paisley Tramways Company started a horse-drawn tramway service on 30 December 1885.

== Closure ==
The company was taken over by Paisley District Tramways Company on 17 September 1903.
