= Chester Corporation Tramways =

English tramway service operator

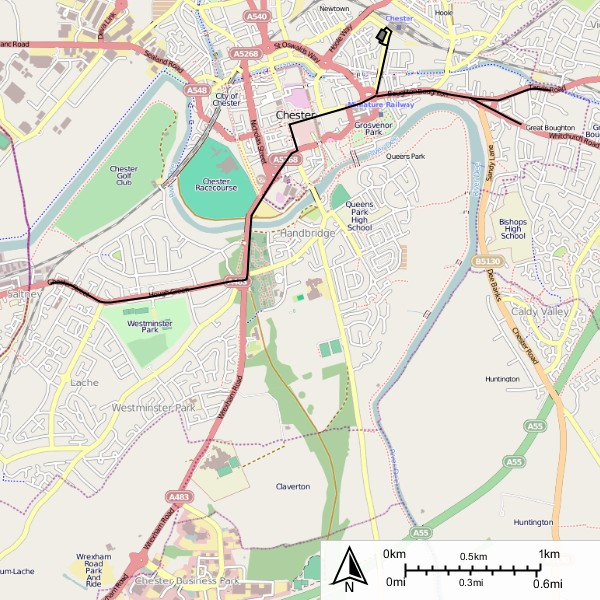
- Map of Chester Corporation Tramways

Operation
- Locale: Chester
- Open: 6 April 1903
- Close: 15 February 1930
- Status: Closed

Infrastructure
- Track gauge: 3 ft 6 in (1,067 mm)
- Propulsion system: Electric
- Depot: Car Street

Statistics
- Route length: 3.58 miles (5.76 km)

Chester Corporation Tramways operated a tramway service in Chester between 1903 and 1930.

== History ==
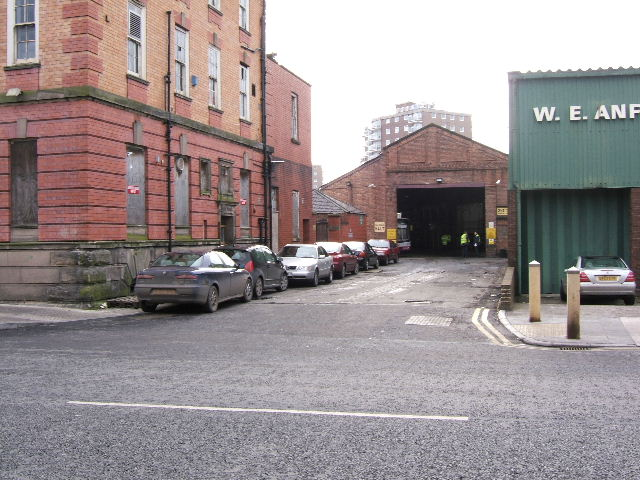
Depot on Car Street

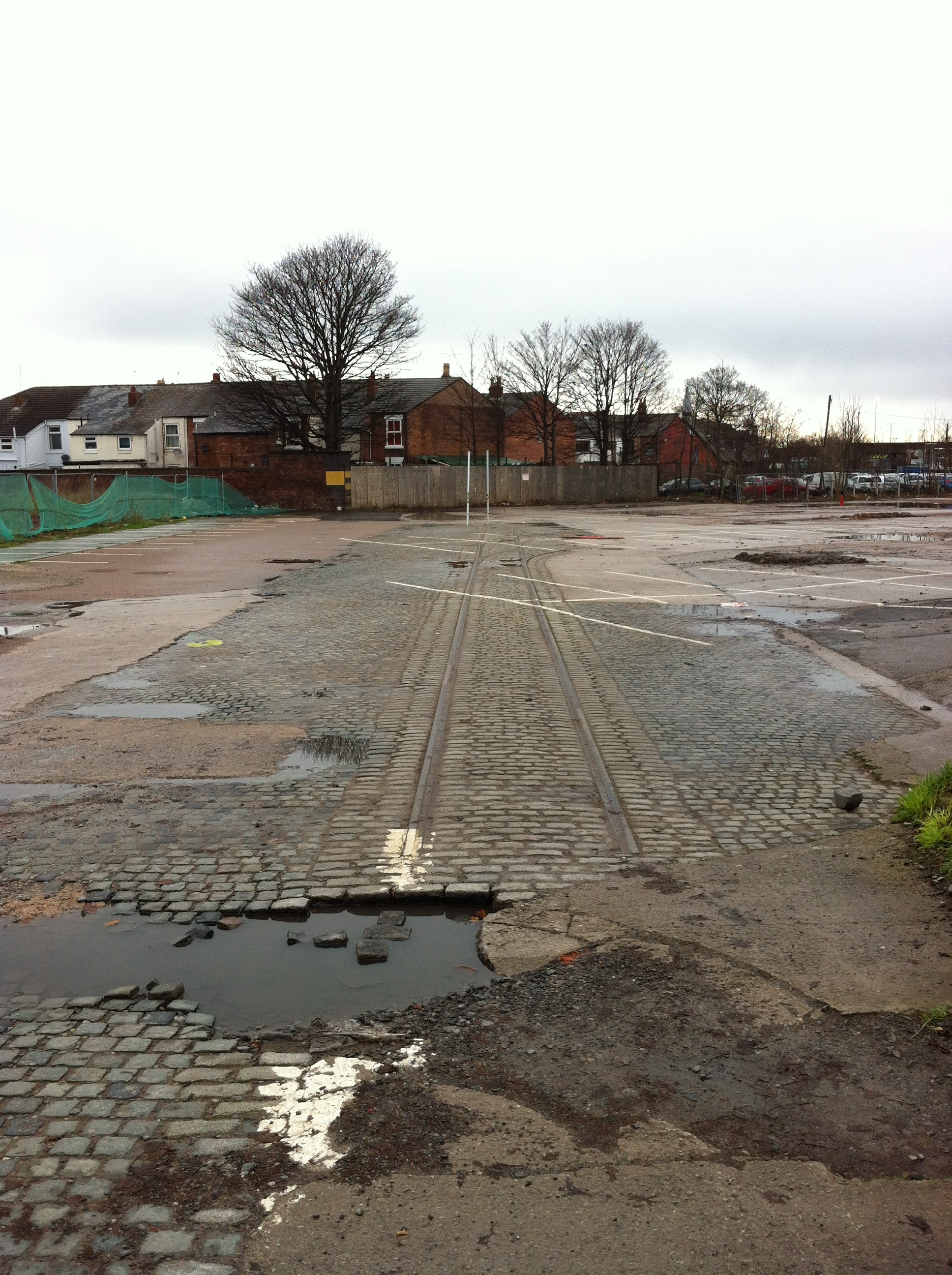
Remains of track just off Crewe Street

Chester Town Council seemed less than enthusiastic to purchase the assets of the Chester Tramways Company which had been providing horse drawn tramcar services since 1879. In September 1899 it had been offered to them by the company for the sum of £36,320 but then in early October they applied to the council for a seven year extension. At the end of October the council finally agreed to their purchase.

In 1900 Chester Corporation applied for an act of Parliament to rebuild and operate the tramways.

Under the Chester Corporation Act 1901, the council took up its option to purchase for a cost of £18,000. Reconstruction work started in 1902 and by 27 December 1902 had shortened the routes which were used by the horse trams to such a significant amount, that the final horse tram service on Grosvenor Road was withdrawn. The horses, 12 trams and effects were disposed of by auction on 31 December 1902. The 32 remaining horses fetched an average of £21 13s each. The system was rebuilt to the narrow gauge of 3'6", and 12 new tramcars were ordered from G. F. Milnes & Co.

Colonel Yorke of the Board of Trade arrived on Saturday 4 April 1903 and inspected the new tramway. The inspection was satisfactory and the service was opened to the public on Monday 6 April 1903 with eight services per hour on the 45 minute journey between Chester railway station and Saltney. On the first day of operation the trams carried 5,290 passengers with receipts of £26 11s 9d. This compared with an average daily taking of between £14 and £15 on the horse tram service.

The residents of Boughton campaigned for an extension to their district and in March 1906 the council approved the plans. Two new routes were provided to Tarvin Bridge and Cherry Orchard which opened on 21 November 1906.

In 1907 the service was enhanced with five new tramcars from the United Electric Car Company of Preston.

== Closure ==
The final public service trams ran on the Saltney route on 12 February 1930 and on the Tarvin and Christleton road routes up to 15 February 1930. As a send off, Alderman Dutton ran a “last tram” to and from Saltney on 15 February 1930. On arrival back at the depot, the tram was broken up within 30 minutes of arrival.

== Preservation ==
Chester Corporation Tramways electric tram number 4, built by G.F. Milnes & Co. in 1903, has been preserved by Hooton Park Trust and is currently undergoing restoration.
