= Gloucester Corporation Tramways =

Tram service in Gloucester, England (1904–1933)

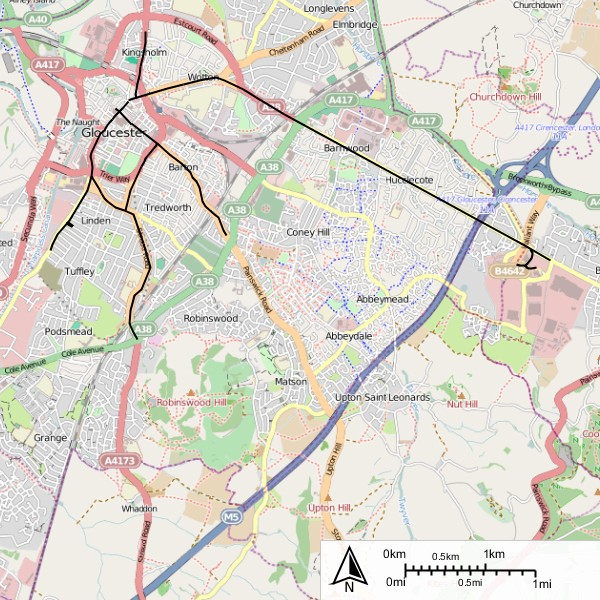
- Map of the Gloucester Corporation Tramways

Operation
- Locale: Gloucester
- Open: 7 May 1904
- Close: 12 January 1933
- Status: Closed

Infrastructure
- Track gauge: 3 ft 6 in (1,067 mm)
- Propulsion system: ???v DC Electric

Statistics
- Route length: 9.75 miles (15.69 km)

Gloucester Corporation Tramways operated an electric tramway service in Gloucester between 1904 and 1933.

== History ==
Gloucester City Council purchased the assets of the horse-drawn Gloucester Tramways Company in 1902, with the intention of electrifying and extending the service. The horse tramway had been built to the 4' gauge, but the replacement electric service was built to the 3'6" gauge.

The contractor for the rebuilding was George Law of Kidderminster. Edgar Allen and Company of the Imperial Steelworks and Yorkshire Steel and Engineering Works, Sheffield, provided the tramlines.

The electric service opened on 7 May 1904. Thirty tramcars were delivered in two batches from Brush Electrical Machines of Loughborough. The livery was crimson lake and cream, but, during World War I, the livery changed to all-grey. This all-grey livery lasted until the system's closure.

The tram depot was located off Bristol Road at its junction with Lysons Road at SO 8256 1717.

== Routes ==
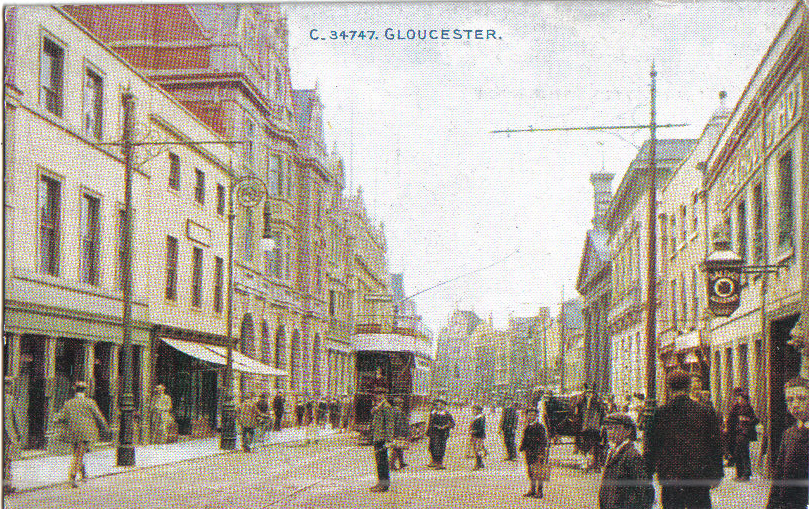
Gloucester Corporation Tramway in Eastgate Street.

The company operated tramways along the six main roads leading out of Gloucester. A portion of the Brockworth via Hucclecote route was owned by Gloucestershire County Council.

An extension from Churchdown Lane, Hucclecote, to the Victoria Inn, Brockworth, and into the new Brockworth Aerodrome took place during 1917, using recovered track from the little-used Westgate Street line. More track was laid into the Great Western Railway (GWR) sidings at Gloucester Docks, where much of the material was unloaded. Some of the trams were fitted out so that they acted as locomotives pulling several railway trucks, taking materials to the aerodrome. In the summers of 1922 to 1924, a passenger service ran to the Victoria Inn, transporting passengers to. what was then, the countryside. After this, the track extension, from Brockworth back to Churchdown Lane, was lifted.

== Closure ==
As part of a programme of replacing the tramway services with buses, which had started in 1929, the final trams ran on 12 January 1933. In 1935, Gloucester City Council entered into an agreement with the Bristol Omnibus Co. to lease out its bus services. A joint committee administered these services. Bristol Omnibus and Gloucester Corporation both held their own road service licences for the city (joint) routes. Until Stagecoach West took over the services in 1993, 25 Bristol/NBC/Western Travel buses always showed “(City of) Gloucester” on their sides, along with the city's coat of arms.

In Bristol days, the 1930s bus depot was, and still is, in London Road, almost opposite Great Western Road.
