= Glenanne Loughgilly Tramway =

Tramway operator in Ireland

Operation
- Locale: Glenanne, Loughgilly
- Open: 1897
- Close: 1919
- Status: Closed

Infrastructure
- Track gauge: 1 ft 10 in (559 mm)
- Propulsion system: Horse

Statistics
- Route length: 3 miles (4.8 km)

The Glenanne Loughgilly Tramway operated a tramway service from Glenanne to Loughgilly in Ireland between 1897 and 1919.

== History ==
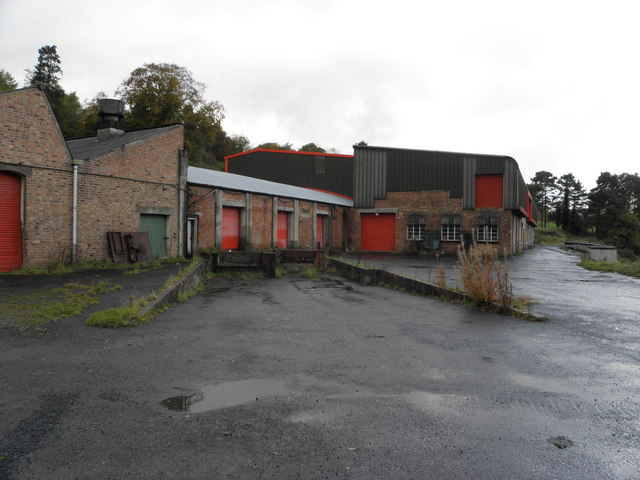
Glenanne Mill

George Gray and Sons, owners of Glenanne Mill, had the track laid out along the two and a half miles stretch to Loughgilly railway station. It was built to transport coal to the mill at Glenanne and finished linen products to the Great Northern Railway station at Loughgilly on the Newry-Armagh railway line.

Work on laying the track was completed in 1897 and the first tram ran later that year. The decision to provide a passenger service was to ease the lives of the local residents.

A return fare cost 3d and a single journey cost 2d.

== Closure ==
The last tram ran in 1919 and the track was lifted the same year.
