= Middlesbrough, Stockton and Thornaby Electric Tramways Company =

English tram company, 1898–1921

Operation
- Locale: Middlesbrough, Thornaby-on-Tees, Stockton-on-Tees, Norton
- Open: 21 May 1898
- Close: 2 April 1921
- Status: Closed

Infrastructure
- Track gauge: 3 ft 7 in (1,093 mm)
- Propulsion system: Electric
- Depot: Boathouse Lane

The Middlesbrough, Stockton and Thornaby Electric Tramways Company was a transport company that operated an electric tramway service between Middlesbrough, Thornaby-on-Tees, Stockton-on-Tees and Norton between 1898 and 1921.

== History ==
The Imperial Tramways Company had been acquiring local tramway companies in the area, and once these were all under its control, it rebuilt these as a unified system to connect Middlesbrough and Stockton. From Norton Green, the former steam route was extended beyond Thornaby to Newport, and the former horse route was extended beyond Middlesbrough Town Hall to Borough Road East. From Middlesbrough railway station the line extended beyond Benson Street, to Roman Road. Services started on 16 July 1898. One further extension from Middlesbrough railway station to the ferry opened on 16 August 1901.

The depot was located off Boathouse Lane at grid reference NZ 44769 18289.

== Closure ==
On 2 April 1921, the Middlesbrough, Stockton and Thornaby corporations exercised their rights to purchase the tramway company assets within their own districts and set up their own tramway operations as Middlesbrough Corporation Tramways. The transfer of this Imperial Tramways Company concern brought to an end to Imperial's tramway interests, although the company continued in existence until it sold the Corris Railway in 1930.
