= List of acts of the Parliament of the United Kingdom from 1934 =

This is a complete list of acts of the Parliament of the United Kingdom for the year 1934.

Note that the first parliament of the United Kingdom was held in 1801; parliaments between 1707 and 1800 were either parliaments of Great Britain or of Ireland). For acts passed up until 1707, see the list of acts of the Parliament of England and the list of acts of the Parliament of Scotland. For acts passed from 1707 to 1800, see the list of acts of the Parliament of Great Britain. See also the list of acts of the Parliament of Ireland.

For acts of the devolved parliaments and assemblies in the United Kingdom, see the list of acts of the Scottish Parliament, the list of acts of the Northern Ireland Assembly, and the list of acts and measures of Senedd Cymru; see also the list of acts of the Parliament of Northern Ireland.

The number shown after each act's title is its chapter number. Acts passed before 1963 are cited using this number, preceded by the year(s) of the reign during which the relevant parliamentary session was held; thus the Union with Ireland Act 1800 is cited as "39 & 40 Geo. 3 c. 67", meaning the 67th act passed during the session that started in the 39th year of the reign of George III and which finished in the 40th year of that reign. Note that the modern convention is to use Arabic numerals in citations (thus "41 Geo. 3" rather than "41 Geo. III"). Acts of the last session of the Parliament of Great Britain and the first session of the Parliament of the United Kingdom are both cited as "41 Geo. 3". Acts passed from 1963 onwards are simply cited by calendar year and chapter number.

== 24 & 25 Geo. 5 ==
Continuing the third session of the 36th Parliament of the United Kingdom, which met from 21 November 1933 until 16 November 1934.

This session was also traditionally cited as 24 & 25 G. 5.

=== Public general acts ===
Short title	Citation	Royal assent
Long title
Consolidated Fund (No. 1) Act 1934 (repealed)	24 & 25 Geo. 5. c. 3	28 March 1934
An Act to apply certain sums out of the Consolidated Fund to the service of the years ending on the thirty-first day of March, one thousand nine hundred and thirty-three, one thousand nine hundred and thirty-four and one thousand nine hundred and thirty-five. (Repealed by Statute Law Revision Act 1950 (14 Geo. 6. c. 6))
British Hydrocarbon Oils Production Act 1934 (repealed)	24 & 25 Geo. 5. c. 4	28 March 1934
An Act to provide for a preference in respect of light hydrocarbon oils manufactured in the United Kingdom from coal, shale, or peat, indigenous to the United Kingdom or from products produced from those substances; and to provide for the collection of information as to the production of such oils. (Repealed by Finance Act 1938 (1 & 2 Geo. 6. c. 46))
Air Force Reserve (Pilots and Observers) Act 1934 (repealed)	24 & 25 Geo. 5. c. 5	28 March 1934
An Act to extend the maximum period of annual training in the case of men of the air force reserve who are serving as pilots or observers, or are qualifying for service as such. (Repealed by Statute Law (Repeals) Act 1976 (c. 16))
Dyestuffs (Import Regulation) Act 1934 (repealed)	24 & 25 Geo. 5. c. 6	28 March 1934
An Act to amend and make permanent the Dyestuffs (Import Regulation) Act, 1920. (Note: Dyestuffs (Import Regulations) Act 1920 (10 & 11 Geo. 5. c. 77)) (Repealed by European Free Trade Association Act 1960 (8 & 9 Eliz. 2. c. 19))
Rural Water Supplies Act 1934 (repealed)	24 & 25 Geo. 5. c. 7	28 March 1934
An Act to empower the Minister of Health and the Department of Health for Scotland to make contributions towards expenses to be incurred by local authorities in providing or improving supplies of water in rural localities. (Repealed by Rural Water Supplies and Sewerage Act 1944 (7 & 8 Geo. 6. c. 26) and Statute Law (Repeals) Act 1975 (c. 10))
Indian Pay (Temporary Abatements) Act 1934 (repealed)	24 & 25 Geo. 5. c. 8	28 March 1934
An Act to extend the period in respect of which abatements from pay may be made under the Indian Pay (Temporary Abatements) Act, 1931, (Note: Indian Pay (Temporary Abatements) Act 1931 (22 & 23 Geo. 5. c. 7)) subject to a reduction in the percentage to which such abatements are limited. (Repealed by Statute Law Revision Act 1950 (14 Geo. 6. c. 6))
Mining Industry (Welfare Fund) Act 1934 (repealed)	24 & 25 Geo. 5. c. 9	28 March 1934
An Act to amend section twenty of the Mining Industry Act, 1920, (Note: Mining Industry Act 1920 (10 & 11 Geo. 5. c. 50)) and the enactments amending that section. (Repealed by Miners' Welfare Act 1952 (15 & 16 Geo. 6 & 1 Eliz. 2. c. 23))
North Atlantic Shipping Act 1934 (repealed)	24 & 25 Geo. 5. c. 10	28 March 1934
An Act to provide financial facilities in connection with the construction of large vessels for the North Atlantic shipping trade, and in connection with the merger of certain shipping companies in respect of their interests in that trade; and for purposes connected with the matters aforesaid. (Repealed by National Loans Act 1968 (c. 13))
Army and Air Force (Annual) Act 1934 (repealed)	24 & 25 Geo. 5. c. 11	26 April 1934
An Act to provide, during Twelve Months, for the Discipline and Regulation of the Army and the Air Force. (Repealed by Statute Law Revision Act 1950 (14 Geo. 6. c. 6), Statute Law Revision Act 1953 (2 & 3 Eliz. 2. c. 5) and Revision of the Army and Air Force Acts (Transitional Provisions) Act 1955 (3 & 4 Eliz. 2. c. 20))
Overseas Trade Act 1934 (repealed)	24 & 25 Geo. 5. c. 12	26 April 1934
An Act to extend the period during which guarantees may respectively be given and remain in force under the Overseas Trade Acts, 1920 to 1930. (Repealed by Export Guarantees Act 1937 (1 Edw. 8 & 1 Geo. 6. c. 61))
Marriage (Extension of Hours) Act 1934 (repealed)	24 & 25 Geo. 5. c. 13	17 May 1934
An Act to allow marriages to be solemnized at any time between 8 a.m. and 6 p.m. (Repealed by Foreign Marriage (Amendment) Act 1988 (c. 44))
Arbitration Act 1934 (repealed)	24 & 25 Geo. 5. c. 14	17 May 1934
An Act to mend the law relating to arbitrations and to make provision for other matters connected therewith. (Repealed by Arbitration Act 1950 (14 Geo. 6. c. 27))
Supply of Water in Bulk Act 1934 (repealed)	24 & 25 Geo. 5. c. 15	17 May 1934
An Act to empower statutory water undertakers to give and to take supplies of water in bulk. (Repealed by Water Act 1945 (8 & 9 Geo. 6. c. 42))
Firearms Act 1934 (repealed)	24 & 25 Geo. 5. c. 16	17 May 1934
An Act to amend the Firearms Act, 1920, (Note: Firearms Act 1920 (10 & 11 Geo. 5. c. 43)) as to the age of persons who may purchase firearms or to whom firearms may be sold; and to alter the definition of firearms in the said Act. (Repealed by Firearms Act 1937 (1 Edw. 8 & 1 Geo. 6. c. 12))
County Courts (Amendment) Act 1934 (repealed)	24 & 25 Geo. 5. c. 17	17 May 1934
An Act to amend the County Courts Acts, 1888 to 1924, and certain other enactments relating to county courts. (Repealed by County Courts Act 1934 (24 & 25 Geo. 5. c. 53))
Illegal Trawling (Scotland) Act 1934	24 & 25 Geo. 5. c. 18	17 May 1934
An Act to amend the law with regard to the enforcement of enactments prohibiting the use in Scotland of the methods of fishing known as beam and otter trawling, and to the penalties that may be imposed in Scotland for other offences in connection with sea fisheries; and for purposes connected therewith.
Registration of Births, Deaths, and Marriages (Scotland) (Amendment) Act 1934 (repealed)	24 & 25 Geo. 5. c. 19	17 May 1934
An Act to amend the enactments relating to the registration of births, deaths, and marriages in Scotland with respect to the matters which are required to be inserted in the register of corrected entries; to make provision for the re-registration of births in certain cases and for the issue of abbreviated certificates of birth; to repeal in part section twenty-six of the Registration of Births, Deaths, and Marriages (Scotland) Act, 1854; (Note: Registration of Births, Deaths, and Marriages (Scotland) Act 1854 (17 & 18 Vict. c. 80)) and for purposes connected with the matters aforesaid. (Repealed by Registration of Births, Deaths and Marriages (Scotland) Act 1965 (c. 49))
Water Supplies (Exceptional Shortage Orders) Act 1934 (repealed)	24 & 25 Geo. 5. c. 20	17 May 1934
An Act to authorise the Minister of Health, and the Secretary of State and the Department of Health for Scotland, to make orders, and to give directions, with a view to meeting deficiencies in water supplies due to exceptional shortage of rain, and for purposes connected with the matters aforesaid. (Repealed for England and Wales by Water Consolidation (Consequential Provisions) Act 1991 (c. 60) and for Scotland by Statute Law (Repeals) Act 1993 (c. 50))
Protection of Animals Act 1934 (repealed)	24 & 25 Geo. 5. c. 21	17 May 1934
An Act to provide further protection to certain animals. (Repealed for England and Wales by Animal Welfare Act 2006 (c. 45) and for Scotland by Animal Health and Welfare (Scotland) Act 2006 (asp 11))
Assessor of Public Undertakings (Scotland) Act 1934 (repealed)	24 & 25 Geo. 5. c. 22	22 June 1934
An Act to amend the designation of the Assessor of Railways and Canals in Scotland and the law relating to the appointment of the said assessor and the provision of superannuation allowances for the said assessor and the clerks and other officers employed by him. (Repealed by Local Government and Rating Act 1997 (c. 29))
Workmen's Compensation (Coal Mines) Act 1934 (repealed)	24 & 25 Geo. 5. c. 23	22 June 1934
An Act to provide that the owners of coal mines in Great Britain shall insure against, or otherwise ensure the discharge of, their liabilities under the Workmen's Compensation Act, 1925; (Note: Workmen's Compensation Act 1925 (15 & 16 Geo. 5. c. 84)) to enable certain mutual indemnity associations to make deposits with the Accountant General of the Supreme Court; and for purposes incidental to, and connected with, the matters aforesaid. (Repealed by National Insurance (Industrial Injuries) Act 1946 (9 & 10 Geo. 6. c. 62))
Statutory Salaries (Restoration) Act 1934 (repealed)	24 & 25 Geo. 5. c. 24	22 June 1934
An Act to empower His Majesty to revoke the National Economy (Statutory Salaries) Order, 1931, (Note: National Economy (Statutory Salaries) Order 1931 (SR&O 1931/810)) and to provide that while the said Order remains in force the abatement to be made thereunder from any salary shall be reduced by one-half, and for purposes connected with the matters aforesaid. (Repealed by Statute Law Revision Act 1953 (2 & 3 Eliz. 2. c. 5))
Protection of Animals (Cruelty to Dogs) (Scotland) Act 1934 (repealed)	24 & 25 Geo. 5. c. 25	22 June 1934
An Act to enable courts in Scotland to disqualify for keeping dogs persons convicted of cruelty to them. (Repealed by Protection of Animals (Amendment) Act 1988 (c. 29))
Licensing (Permitted Hours) Act 1934 (repealed)	24 & 25 Geo. 5. c. 26	22 June 1934
An Act to make provision with regard to the power to make, and the validity of, directions under paragraph (b) (i) of the proviso to subsection (1) of section one of the Licensing Act, 1921, (Note: Licensing Act 1921 (11 & 12 Geo. 5. c. 42)) as respects a part of the year only, and to the power to fix, and the validity of decisions fixing, the permitted hours on week-days where such directions are so made. (Repealed for England and Wales by Licensing Act 1953 (1 & 2 Eliz. 2. c. 46) and for Scotland by Licensing (Scotland) Act 1959 (7 & 8 Eliz. 2. c. 51))
Mines (Working Facilities) Act 1934 (repealed)	24 & 25 Geo. 5. c. 27	28 June 1934
An Act to extend to certain other minerals the provisions of Part II of the Mining Industry Act, 1926, (Note: Mining Industry Act 1926 (16 & 17 Geo. 5. c. 28)) relating to the grant of facilities for searching for and working coal. (Repealed by Mines (Working Facilities and Support) Act 1966 (c. 4))
Gas Undertakings Act 1934 (repealed)	24 & 25 Geo. 5. c. 28	28 June 1934
An Act to amend the law with respect to gas undertakings. (Repealed by Gas Act 1948 (11 & 12 Geo. 6. c. 67))
Unemployment Act 1934 or the Unemployment Insurance Act 1934 (part 1 of the act) or the Unemployment Assistance Act 1934 (part 2 of the act) (repealed)	24 & 25 Geo. 5. c. 29	28 June 1934
An Act to amend the Unemployment Insurance Acts, 1920 to 1933, and to make further provision for the training and assistance of persons who are capable of, and available for, work but have no work or only part-time or intermittent work; and for purposes connected with the matters aforesaid. (Repealed by National Assistance Act 1948 (11 & 12 Geo. 6. c. 29))
Cotton Manufacturing Industry (Temporary Provisions) Act 1934 (repealed)	24 & 25 Geo. 5. c. 30	28 June 1934
An Act to make temporary provision for enabling statutory effect to be given to rates of wages agreed between representative organisations in the cotton manufacturing industry; and for purposes connected with the matter aforesaid. (Repealed by Statute Law (Repeals) Act 1981 (c. 19))
Debts Clearing Offices and Import Restrictions Act 1934 (repealed)	24 & 25 Geo. 5. c. 31	28 June 1934
An Act to authorise the setting up of Clearing Offices for collecting and dealing with certain debts; to authorise the imposition of restrictions on imports from certain foreign countries, and for purposes connected with the matters aforesaid. (Repealed by Customs and Excise Act 1952 (15 & 16 Geo. 6 & 1 Eliz. 2. c. 44) and Statute Law Revision Act 1953 (2 & 3 Eliz. 2. c. 5))
Finance Act 1934	24 & 25 Geo. 5. c. 32	12 July 1934
An Act to grant certain duties of Customs and Inland Revenue (including Excise), to alter other duties, and to amend the law relating to Customs and Inland Revenue (including Excise) and the National Debt, and to make further provision in connection with Finance.
Palestine Loan Act 1934 (repealed)	24 & 25 Geo. 5. c. 33	12 July 1934
An Act to authorise the Treasury to guarantee a loan to be raised by the Government of Palestine. (Repealed by Palestine Act 1948 (11 & 12 Geo. 6. c. 27))
Adoption of Children (Workmen's Compensation) Act 1934 (repealed)	24 & 25 Geo. 5. c. 34	12 July 1934
An Act to make further and better provision as to the status of adopted children and of their relatives by adoption, for the purposes of the enactments relating to workmen's compensation. (Repealed by National Insurance (Industrial Injuries) Act 1946 (9 & 10 Geo. 6. c. 62))
Land Settlement (Scotland) Act 1934 (repealed)	24 & 25 Geo. 5. c. 35	12 July 1934
An Act to authorise during the period of three years commencing on the first day of April, nineteen hundred and thirty-four, in lieu of sums payable to the Agriculture (Scotland) Fund under section five of the Small Landholders (Scotland) Act, 1911, (Note: Small Landholders (Scotland) Act 1911 (1 & 2 Geo. 5. c. 49)) and the Sixth Schedule to the Local Government (Scotland) Act, 1929, (Note: Local Government (Scotland) Act 1929 (19 & 20 Geo. 5. c. 25)) the placing at the disposal of the Department of Agriculture for Scotland, of a sum not exceeding two hundred and seventy-five thousand pounds annually out of moneys voted by Parliament. (Repealed by Statute Law Revision Act 1950 (14 Geo. 6. c. 6))
Petroleum (Production) Act 1934 (repealed)	24 & 25 Geo. 5. c. 36	12 July 1934
An Act to vest in the Crown the property in petroleum and natural gas within Great Britain and to make provision with respect to the searching and boring for and getting of petroleum and natural gas, and for purposes connected with the matters aforesaid. (Repealed by Petroleum Act 1998 (c. 17))
Trustee Savings Banks (Special Investments) Act 1934 (repealed)	24 & 25 Geo. 5. c. 37	25 July 1934
An Act to amend the law with respect to the investment of moneys received by the trustees of trustee savings banks in respect of special investments. (Repealed by Trustee Savings Banks Act 1954 (2 & 3 Eliz. 2. c. 63))
Architects (Registration) Act 1934 (repealed)	24 & 25 Geo. 5. c. 38	25 July 1934
An Act to amend the Architects (Registration) Act, 1931. (Note: Architects (Registration) Act 1931 (21 & 22 Geo. 5. c. 33)) (Repealed by Architects Registration (Amendment) Act 1969 (c. 42))
British Sugar (Subsidy) Act 1934 (repealed)	24 & 25 Geo. 5. c. 39	25 July 1934
An Act to extend by eleven months the period in respect; of which subsidies are payable under the British Sugar (Subsidy) Act, 1925, (Note: British Sugar (Subsidy) Act 1925 (15 & 16 Geo. 5. c. 12)) and to make further provision as to the rates of subsidy payable under the said Act, as so amended, and the administration thereof. (Repealed by Statute Law Revision Act 1950 (14 Geo. 6. c. 6))
Administration of Justice (Appeals) Act 1934 (repealed)	24 & 25 Geo. 5. c. 40	25 July 1934
An Act to provide that no appeal shall lie from the Court of Appeal to the House of Lords except with the leave of that Court or the House of lords, to make further provision as respects appeals from County courts, and for purposes connected with the matters aforesaid. (Repealed by Crime and Courts Act 2013 (c. 22))
Law Reform (Miscellaneous Provisions) Act 1934	24 & 25 Geo. 5. c. 41	25 July 1934
An Act to amend the law as to the effect of death in relation to causes of action and as to the awarding of interest in civil proceedings.
Shops Act 1934 (repealed)	24 & 25 Geo. 5. c. 42	25 July 1934
An Act to regulate the hours of employment of persons under the age of eighteen years who are employed about the business of wholesale or retail shops or employed elsewhere in connection with wholesale or retail trade or business, and to make provision as to the arrangements in shops and warehouses for the health and comfort of workers, and for purposes connected with the matters aforesaid. (Repealed by Shops Act 1950 (14 Geo. 6. c. 28))
National Maritime Museum Act 1934	24 & 25 Geo. 5. c. 43	25 July 1934
An Act to make provision for the establishment of National Maritime museum and for the addition of certain lands to Greenwich Park, and for purposes connected with the matters aforesaid.
Appropriation Act 1934 (repealed)	24 & 25 Geo. 5. c. 44	31 July 1934
An Act to apply a sum out of the Consolidated Fund to the service of the year ending on the thirty-first day of March, one thousand nine hundred and thirty-five, and to appropriate the Supplies granted in this Session of Parliament. (Repealed by Statute Law Revision Act 1950 (14 Geo. 6. c. 6))
Solicitors Act 1934 (repealed)	24 & 25 Geo. 5. c. 45	31 July 1934
An Act to prohibit bodies corporate from purporting to act as solicitors. (Repealed for Scotland by Solicitors (Scotland) Act 1980 (c. 46) and for England and Wales by Statute Law (Repeals) Act 1986 (c. 12))
Isle of Man (Customs) Act 1934 (repealed)	24 & 25 Geo. 5. c. 46	31 July 1934
An Act to amend the law with respect to customs in the Isle of Man. (Repealed for the Isle of Man by Customs and Excise etc. Order 1976 (GC No 1/76))
Colonial Stock Act 1934 (repealed)	24 & 25 Geo. 5. c. 47	31 July 1934
An Act to provide as respects Dominion Stocks an alternative to the third of the conditions prescribed by the Treasury under section two of the Colonial Stock Act, 1900. (Note: Colonial Stock Act 1900 (63 & 64 Vict. c. 62)) (Repealed by Trustee Investments Act 1961 (9 & 10 Eliz. 2. c. 62))
Public Works Loans Act 1934 (repealed)	24 & 25 Geo. 5. c. 48	31 July 1934
An Act to grant money for the purpose of certain local loans out of the Local Loans Fund, and for other purposes relating to local loans. (Repealed by Statute Law Revision Act 1950 (14 Geo. 6. c. 6))
Whaling Industry (Regulation) Act 1934	24 & 25 Geo. 5. c. 49	31 July 1934
An Act to enable effect to be given to a Convention for the Regulation of Whaling, signed at Geneva on behalf of His Majesty on the twenty-fourth day of September, nineteen hundred and thirty-one; to prohibit the taking or treating of whales within the coastal waters of the United Kingdom; and for purposes connected with the matters aforesaid.
Road Traffic Act 1934 (repealed)	24 & 25 Geo. 5. c. 50	31 July 1934
An Act to amend the Road Traffic Act, 1930, (Note: Road Traffic Act 1930 (20 & 21 Geo. 5. c. 43)) and section thirty-four of the Road and Rail Traffic Act, 1933, (Note: Road and Rail Traffic Act 1933 (23 & 24 Geo. 5. c. 53)) and for purposes incidental thereto. (Repealed by Statute Law (Repeals) Act 1989 (c. 43))
Milk Act 1934 (repealed)	24 & 25 Geo. 5. c. 51	31 July 1934
An Act to provide for temporarily securing to producers of milk, by means of payments out of moneys provided by Parliament, a minimum return in respect of milk used in the manufacture of milk products; for conditionally requiring repayment to the Exchequer of the amount of such payments; for making, out of moneys so provided, payments for the purposes of improving the quality of the milk supply and increasing the demand for milk; for regulating the manner in which milk is described for the purposes of advertisement and sale; for imposing and conferring certain duties and powers on boards administering milk marketing schemes; and for purposes connected with the matters aforesaid. (Repealed by Food Safety Act 1990 (c. 16))
Poor Law (Scotland) Act 1934 (repealed)	24 & 25 Geo. 5. c. 52	31 July 1934
An Act to make permanent certain temporary enactments relating to the relief of the poor in Scotland; and to make further provision with regard to such relief. (Repealed by National Assistance Act 1948 (11 & 12 Geo. 6. c. 29))
County Courts Act 1934 (repealed)	24 & 25 Geo. 5. c. 53	31 July 1934
An Act to consolidate certain enactments relating to County Courts. (Repealed by Judicial Pensions Act 1981 (c. 20))
Cattle Industry (Emergency Provisions) Act 1934 (repealed)	24 & 25 Geo. 5. c. 54	31 July 1934
An Act to provide for the establishment of a Cattle Fund; for the making of payments and advances to the said fund out of moneys provided by Parliament and out of the Consolidated Fund of the United Kingdom; for the making of payments out of the Cattle Fund to producers of cattle in respect of the sale by them, during a limited period, of certain cattle or carcases of certain cattle; for the marking of imported cattle; for the appointment of a Cattle Committee; and for purposes connected with the matters aforesaid. (Repealed by National Loans Act 1968 (c. 13))
Dindings Agreement (Approval) Act 1934 (repealed)	24 & 25 Geo. 5. c. 55	16 November 1934
An Act to approve an agreement made on behalf of His Majesty with the Sultan of Perak. (Repealed by Statute Law (Repeals) Act 1973 (c. 39))
Incitement to Disaffection Act 1934	24 & 25 Geo. 5. c. 56	16 November 1934
An Act to make better provision for the prevention and punishment of endeavours to seduce members of His Majesty's forces from their duty or allegiance.
Expiring Laws Continuance Act 1934 (repealed)	24 & 25 Geo. 5. c. 57	16 November 1934
An Act to continue certain expiring laws. (Repealed by Statute Law Revision Act 1950 (14 Geo. 6. c. 6))
Betting and Lotteries Act 1934 (repealed)	24 & 25 Geo. 5. c. 58	16 November 1934
An Act to amend the law with respect to betting on tracks where sporting events take place, including the law with respect to totalisators on horse racecourses; to authorise, subject to restrictions, the establishment of totalisators on dog racecourses; to prohibit betting on tracks with young persons and pari mutuel betting except by authorised totalisators; to amend the law with respect to lotteries and certain prize competitions; and for purposes connected with the matters aforesaid. (Repealed by Statute Law (Repeals) Act 2004 (c. 14))
Poor Law Act 1934 (repealed)	24 & 25 Geo. 5. c. 59	16 November 1934
An Act to amend the enactments relating to the relief of the poor in England and Wales so as to secure uniformity throughout Great Britain in the provisions relating to the disregarding of sick pay, maternity benefit, and wounds or disability pensions. (Repealed by National Assistance Act 1948 (11 & 12 Geo. 6. c. 29))

=== Local acts ===
Short title	Citation	Royal assent
Long title
Public Works Facilities Scheme (Huddersfield Corporation) Confirmation Act 1934 (repealed)	24 & 25 Geo. 5. c. vii	28 March 1934
An Act to confirm a Scheme made by the Minister of Transport under the Public Works Facilities Act, 1930, (Note: Public Works Facilities Act 1930 (20 & 21 Geo. 5. c. 50)) relating to the Huddersfield Corporation. (Repealed by West Yorkshire County Council Act 1980 (c. xiv))
	Huddersfield Corporation Scheme.	
Public Works Facilities Scheme (Boston Corporation) Confirmation Act 1934	24 & 25 Geo. 5. c. viii	28 March 1934
An Act to confirm a Scheme made by the Minister of Health under the Public Works Facilities Act, 1930, relating to the Boston Corporation.
	Boston Corporation (Water) Scheme.	
Ministry of Health Provisional Order Confirmation (Belper) Act 1934	24 & 25 Geo. 5. c. ix	28 March 1934
An Act to confirm a Provisional Order of the Minister of Health relating to the Rural District of Belper.
	Belper Order 1934	
Ministry of Health Provisional Order Confirmation (North Buckinghamshire Joint Hospital District) Act 1934	24 & 25 Geo. 5. c. x	28 March 1934
An Act to confirm a Provisional Order of the Minister of Health relating to the North Buckinghamshire Joint Hospital District.
	North Buckinghamshire Joint Hospital Order 1934	
Ministry of Health Provisional Order Confirmation (Crosby, Litherland and Waterloo Joint Cemetery District) Act 1934	24 & 25 Geo. 5. c. xi	28 March 1934
An Act to confirm a Provisional Order of the Minister of Health relating to the Crosby, Litherland and Waterloo Joint Cemetery District,
	Crosby, Litherland and Waterloo Joint Cemetery Order 1934	
Ministry of Health Provisional Order Confirmation (Rochester, Chatham and Gillingham Joint Sewerage District) Act 1934 (repealed)	24 & 25 Geo. 5. c. xii	28 March 1934
An Act to confirm a Provisional Order of the Minister of Health relating to the Rochester, Chatham and Gillingham Joint Sewerage District. (Repealed by County of Kent Act 1981 (c. xviii))
	Rochester, Chatham and Gillingham Joint Sewerage District Order 1934	
Ministry of Health Provisional Order Confirmation (Wirral Joint Hospital District) Act 1934	24 & 25 Geo. 5. c. xiii	28 March 1934
An Act to confirm a Provisional Order of the Minister of Health relating to the Wirral Joint Hospital District.
	Wirral Joint Hospital Order 1934	
Aire and Calder Navigation Act 1934	24 & 25 Geo. 5. c. xiv	28 March 1934
An Act to extend the time for the completion of certain works authorised by the Acts relating to the undertakers of the Aire and Calder Navigation; to increase the borrowing powers of the undertakers; to authorise a further payment by the Humber Conservancy Board towards the cost of constructing certain training walls, and for other purposes.
Somersham Rectory Act 1934	24 & 25 Geo. 5. c. xv	28 March 1934
An Act to make better provision with respect to the Rectory of Somersham and the possessions and emoluments thereof, and for other purposes.
South Metropolitan Gas (No. 1) Act 1934 (repealed)	24 & 25 Geo. 5. c. xvi	26 April 1934
An Act to prohibit the making by housing authorities of conditions as to the form of light, heat, power, or energy to be supplied or used in certain cases in the limits of supply of the South Metropolitan Gas Company, and for other purposes. (Repealed by Gas Act 1948 (11 & 12 Geo. 6. c. 67))
Brighton, Hove and Worthing Gas Act 1934 (repealed)	24 & 25 Geo. 5. c. xvii	26 April 1934
An Act to prohibit the making by housing authorities of conditions as to the form of light, heat, power, or energy to be supplied or used in certain cases in the limits of supply of the Brighton, Hove and Worthing Gas Company, and for other purposes. (Repealed by Gas Act 1948 (11 & 12 Geo. 6. c. 67))
East Worcestershire Water Act 1934	24 & 25 Geo. 5. c. xviii	26 April 1934
An Act to empower the East Worcestershire East Waterworks Company to extend their limits for the supply of water; to authorise them to raise further capital; to confer additional powers upon the Company, and for other purposes.
Ministry of Health Provisional Order Confirmation (Accrington) Act 1934	24 & 25 Geo. 5. c. xix	17 May 1934
An Act to confirm a Provisional Order of the Minister of Health relating to the Borough of Accrington.
	Accrington Order 1934	
Ministry of Health Provisional Order Confirmation (Watford) Act 1934	24 & 25 Geo. 5. c. xx	17 May 1934
An Act to confirm a Provisional Order of the Minister of Health relating to the Borough of Watford.
	Watford Order 1934	
Ministry of Health Provisional Order Confirmation (Blackburn) Act 1934 (repealed)	24 & 25 Geo. 5. c. xxi	17 May 1934
An Act to confirm a Provisional Order of the Minister of Health relating to the Borough of Blackburn. (Repealed by County of Lancashire Act 1984 (c. xxi))
	Blackburn Order 1934	
Ministry of Health Provisional Order Confirmation (Shipley) Act 1934 (repealed)	24 & 25 Geo. 5. c. xxii	17 May 1934
An Act to confirm a Provisional Order of the Minister of Health relating to the Urban District of Shipley. (Repealed by West Yorkshire Act 1980 (c. xiv))
	Shipley Order 1934	
South Metropolitan Gas (No. 2) Act 1934	24 & 25 Geo. 5. c. xxiii	17 May 1934
An Act to amend the enactments relating to prepayment meters of the South Metropolitan Gas Company, and for other purposes.
Church House (Westminster) Act 1934	24 & 25 Geo. 5. c. xxiv	17 May 1934
An Act to confirm and to enable effect to be given to an agreement for exchanging and otherwise dealing with certain properties in Dean's Yard, Westminster, for the purpose of enlarging and rebuilding the Church House, and for purposes connected therewith.
Cambridge University and Town Waterworks Act 1934	24 & 25 Geo. 5. c. xxv	17 May 1934
An Act to confer further powers on the Cambridge University and Town Waterworks Company, and for other purposes.
Workington Corporation Act 1934	24 & 25 Geo. 5. c. xxvi	17 May 1934
An Act to make provision for the abolition of certain differential rating in the Borough of Workington; to confer powers upon the Mayor, Aldermen, and Burgesses of the borough with reference to their water undertaking; to make further and better provision for the improvement, health, and local government of the borough, and for other purposes.
Post Office Sites Act 1934 (repealed)	24 & 25 Geo. 5. c. xxvii	22 June 1934
An Act to enable the Postmaster-General, for the purpose of the Post Office, to acquire lands in London; and for purposes connected therewith. (Repealed by Postal Services Act 2000 (Consequential Modifications to Local Enactments) Order 2003 (SI 2003/1542))
Clydebank and District Water Order Confirmation Act 1934	24 & 25 Geo. 5. c. xxviii	22 June 1934
An Act to conform a Provisional Order under the Private Legislation Procedure (Scotland) Acts, 1899 (Note: Private Legislation Procedure (Scotland) Act 1899 (62 & 63 Vict. c. 47)) and 1933, (Note: Private Legislation Procedure (Scotland) Act 1933 (23 & 24 Geo. 5. c. 37)) relating to Clydebank and District Water.
	Clydebank and District Water Order 1934	
Irvine and District Water Board Order Confirmation Act 1934 (repealed)	24 & 25 Geo. 5. c. xxix	22 June 1934
An Act to conform a Provisional Order under the Private Legislation Procedure (Scotland) Acts, 1899 and 1933, relating to Irvine and District Water Board. (Repealed by Irvine and District Water Board Order 1961 (SI 1961/872))
	Irvine and District Water Board Order 1934	
Edinburgh Corporation Order Confirmation Act 1934 (repealed)	24 & 25 Geo. 5. c. xxx	22 June 1934
An Act to conform a Provisional Order under the Private Legislation Procedure (Scotland) Acts, 1899 and 1933, relating to Edinburgh Corporation. (Repealed by Edinburgh Corporation Order Confirmation Act 1962 (c.ii))
	Edinburgh Corporation Order 1934	
Birmingham United Hospital Act 1934	24 & 25 Geo. 5. c. xxxi	22 June 1934
An Act to unite the General Hospital, Birmingham, and the Queen's Hospital, at Birmingham, in one corporation, to be called the "Birmingham United Hospital," and for other purposes.
Watchet Urban District Water Act 1934	24 & 25 Geo. 5. c. xxxii	22 June 1934
An Act to make provision in regard to the finances of the harbour undertaking of the urban district council of Watchet; and for other purposes.
Corby (Northants) and District Water Act 1934	24 & 25 Geo. 5. c. xxxiii	22 June 1934
An Act to extend the periods limited by the Corby (Northants) and District Water Act, 1931, (Note: Corby (Northants) and District Water Act 1931 (21 & 22 Geo. 5. c. civ)) for the construction of works and the acquisition of lands, and for other purposes.
Wandsworth Borough Council Act 1934 (repealed)	24 & 25 Geo. 5. c. xxxiv	22 June 1934
An Act to empower the Mayor, Aldermen, and Councillors of the metropolitan borough of Wandsworth to erect municipal buildings and other buildings and premises and to acquire land, and for other purposes. (Repealed by Local Law (Greater London Council and Inner London Boroughs) Order 1965 (SI 1965/540))
Southern Railway Act 1934	24 & 25 Geo. 5. c. xxxv	22 June 1934
An Act to empower the Southern Railway Company to construct works and acquire lands; to extend the time for the compulsory purchase of certain lands; to confer further powers upon the West London Extension Railway Company, and for other purposes.
South West Suburban Water Act 1934	24 & 25 Geo. 5. c. xxxvi	22 June 1934
An Act to authorise the South West Suburban Water Company to construct new works; to take additional water from the River Thames and to raise additional capital; to confer further powers upon the Company, and for other purposes.
West Gloucestershire Water Act 1934	24 & 25 Geo. 5. c. xxxvii	22 June 1934
An Act to authorise the West Gloucestershire Water Company to construct new waterworks; to extend the limits of supply of the company; to enlarge their powers in relation to the raising of money, and for other purposes.
Darlington Corporation Act 1934	24 & 25 Geo. 5. c. xxxviii	28 June 1934
An Act to extend the boundaries of the County Borough of Darlington; to confer further powers upon the Corporation of Darlington with regard to their gas and water undertakings; to make better provision for the health, local government, and finance of the borough, and for other purposes.
London, Midland and Scottish Railway Act 1934	24 & 25 Geo. 5. c. xxxix	28 June 1934
An Act to empower the London Midland and Scottish Railway Company to construct a railway and to acquire lands, and for other purposes.
London County Council (General Powers) Act 1934	24 & 25 Geo. 5. c. xl	28 June 1934
An Act to confer further powers upon the London County Council and other authorities, and for other purposes.
Renfrewshire County Council (Eastwood and Mearns) Water Order Confirmation Act 1934	24 & 25 Geo. 5. c. xli	12 July 1934
An Act to conform a Provisional Order under the Private Legislation Procedure (Scotland) Acts, 1899 and 1933, relating to Renfrewshire County Council (Eastwood and Mearns) Water.
	Renfrewshire County Council (Eastwood and Mearns) Water Order 1934	
Dundee Corporation Order Confirmation Act 1934 (repealed)	24 & 25 Geo. 5. c. xlii	12 July 1934
An Act to conform a Provisional Order under the Private Legislation Procedure (Scotland) Acts, 1899 and 1933, relating to Dundee Corporation. (Repealed by Dundee Corporation (Water, Transport, Finance, &c.) Order Confirmation Act 1954 (2 & 3 Eliz. 2. c.ix))
	Dundee Corporation Order 1934	
Ministry of Health Provisional Order Confirmation (Morley) Act 1934 (repealed)	24 & 25 Geo. 5. c. xliii	12 July 1934
An Act to confirm a Provisional Order of the Minister of Health relating to the borough of Morley. (Repealed by West Yorkshire Act 1980 (c. xiv))
	Morley Order 1934 Provisional order altering a local Act (Note: Morley Corporation Act 1923 (13 & 14 Geo. 5. c. cv)) and a provisional order.	
Ministry of Health Provisional Order Confirmation (Steyning and District Water) Act 1934	24 & 25 Geo. 5. c. xliv	12 July 1934
An Act to confirm a Provisional Order of the Minister of Health relating to the Steyning and District Waterworks Company Limited.
	Steyning and District Water Order 1934 Provisional order under the Gas and Water Works Facilities Act 1870 (Note: Gas and Water Works Facilities Act 1870 (33 & 34 Vict. c. 70)) and the Gas and Water Works Facilities Act 1870 Amendment Act 1873 (Note: Gas and Water Works Facilities Act 1870 Amendment Act 1873 (36 & 37 Vict. c. 89)) empowering the Steyning and District Waterworks Company Limited to maintain and continue certain existing waterworks and to construct additional waterworks to make further provision as to the capital and borrowing powers of the Company and for other purposes.	
Ministry of Health Provisional Order Confirmation (Milford Haven) Act 1934 (repealed)	24 & 25 Geo. 5. c. xlv	12 July 1934
An Act to confirm a Provisional Order of the Minister of Health relating to the urban district of Milford Haven. (Repealed by Pembrokeshire Water Board Order 1962 (SI 1962/389))
	Milford Haven Order 1934 Provisional order partially repealing and amending local Act (Note: Milford Improvement Act 1857 (20 & 21 Vict. c. lxxiv)) and a provisional order.	
Ministry of Health Provisional Order Confirmation (Burnham and District Water) Act 1934	24 & 25 Geo. 5. c. xlvi	12 July 1934
An Act to confirm a Provisional Order of the Minister of Health relating to the Burnham Dorney and Hitcham Waterworks Company Limited.
	Burnham and District Order 1934 Provisional order under the Gas and Water Works Facilities Act 1870 and the Gas and Water Works Facilities Act 1870 Amendment Act 1873 empowering the Burnham Dorney and Hitcham Waterworks Company Limited to increase their capital and for other purposes.	
Provisional Orders (Marriages) Confirmation Act 1934 (repealed)	24 & 25 Geo. 5. c. xlvii	12 July 1934
An Act to confirm certain Provisional Orders made by one of His Majesty's Principal Secretaries of State under the Marriages Validity (Provisional Orders) Acts 1905 (Note: Provisional Order (Marriages) Act 1905 (5 Edw. 7. c. 23)) and 1924. (Note: Marriages Validity (Provisional Orders) Act 1924 (14 & 15 Geo. 5. c. 20)) (Repealed by Statute Law (Repeals) Act 1977 (c. 18))
	Wesleyan Chapel Millbrook Order.	
	Saint George the Martyr Hindolvestone Order.	
	Chapel of Ease of St. James Barnoldswick Order.	
Mexborough and Swinton Traction (Trolley Vehicles) Order Confirmation Act 1934	24 & 25 Geo. 5. c. xlviii	12 July 1934
An Act to confirm a Provisional Order made by the Minister of Transport under the Mexborough and Swinton Tramways Act 1926 (Note: Mexborough and Swinton Tramways Act 1926 (16 & 17 Geo. 5. c. lxxvi)) relating to Mexborough and Swinton Traction Company's trolley vehicles.
	Mexborough and Swinton Traction (Trolley Vehicles) Order 1934 Order authorising the Mexborough and Swinton Traction Company to use trolley vehicles upon certain routes in the urban districts of Mexborough and Rawmarsh in the west riding of the county of York.	
St. Helens Corporation (Trolley Vehicles) Order Confirmation Act 1934	24 & 25 Geo. 5. c. xlix	12 July 1934
An Act to confirm a Provisional Order made by the Minister of Transport under the St. Helens Corporation Act 1921 (Note: St. Helens Corporation Act 1921 (11 & 12 Geo. 5. c. lxxiii)) relating to St. Helens Corporation trolley vehicles.
	St. Helens Corporation (Trolley Vehicles) Order 1934 Order authorising the mayor aldermen and burgesses of the borough of St. Helens to provide maintain and use trolley vehicles upon certain routes in the borough of St. Helens the urban district of Prescot and the township of Eccleston in the rural district of Whiston.	
Southend-on-Sea Corporation (Trolley Vehicles) Order Confirmation Act 1934 (repealed)	24 & 25 Geo. 5. c. l	12 July 1934
An Act to confirm a Provisional Order made by the Minister of Transport under the Southend-on-Sea Corporation Act 1926 (Note: Southend-on-Sea Corporation Act 1926 (16 & 17 Geo. 5. c. civ)) relating to Southend-on-Sea Corporation trolley vehicles. (Repealed by Essex Act 1987 (c. xx))
	Southend-on-Sea Corporation (Trolley Vehicles) Order 1934 Order authorising the mayor aldermen and burgesses of the borough of Southend-on-Sea to use trolley vehicles upon a route in the borough of Southend-on-Sea.	
Nottingham Corporation (Trolley Vehicles) Order Confirmation Act 1934 (repealed)	24 & 25 Geo. 5. c. li	12 July 1934
An Act to confirm a Provisional Order made by the Minister of Transport under the Nottingham Corporation Act 1913 (Note: Nottingham Corporation Act 1913 (3 & 4 Geo. 5. c. cxiii)) relating to the Nottingham Corporation Trolley Vehicles. (Repealed by Statute Law (Repeals) Act 1995 (c. 44))
	Nottingham Corporation (Trolley Vehicles) Order 1934 Order authorising the lord mayor aldermen and citizens of the city of Nottingham and county of the same city to use trolley vehicles upon a route in the city of Nottingham.	
Prince of Wales's Hospital Plymouth Act 1934 (repealed)	24 & 25 Geo. 5. c. lii	12 July 1934
An Act to amalgamate the South Devon and East Cornwall Hospital Plymouth the Royal Albert Hospital Devonport and the Central Hospital Plymouth to make provision with respect to the property and funds of the said Hospitals to provide for the incorporation of the governing body of the amalgamated hospitals and for other purposes. (Repealed by Statute Law (Repeals) Act 2013 (c. 2))
Walthamstow Corporation Act 1934	24 & 25 Geo. 5. c. liii	12 July 1934
An Act to empower the mayor aldermen and burgesses of the borough of Walthamstow to acquire lands in the borough to extinguish certain reputed lammas rights in or over such lands and for other purposes.
Maidstone Waterworks Act 1934	24 & 25 Geo. 5. c. liv	12 July 1934
An Act to extend the limits of supply of the Maidstone Waterworks Company to consolidate with amendments the provisions of the Maidstone Water Acts and Order 1860 to 1927 relating to the capital and borrowing powers of the Company to authorise the Company to construct new works and to raise additional money to confer further powers upon the Company and for other purposes.
Stockport Corporation Act 1934	24 & 25 Geo. 5. c. lv	12 July 1934
An Act to empower the mayor aldermen and burgesses of the county borough of Stockport to construct additional waterworks to confer further powers in connection with their water gas and electricity undertakings and in regard to the finance and local government of the borough and for other purposes.
Stockport Extension Act 1934	24 & 25 Geo. 5. c. lvi	12 July 1934
An Act to extend the boundaries of the county borough of Stockport and for purposes incidental thereto.
Newport Extension Act 1934	24 & 25 Geo. 5. c. lvii	12 July 1934
An Act to extend the boundaries of the borough of Newport and for purposes incidental thereto.
London County Council (Money) Act 1934 (repealed)	24 & 25 Geo. 5. c. lviii	12 July 1934
An Act to regulate the expenditure on capital account and lending of money by the London County Council during the financial period from the first day of April one thousand nine hundred and thirty-four to the thirtieth day of September one thousand nine hundred and thirty-five and for other purposes. (Repealed by London County Council (Loans) Act 1955 (4 & 5 Eliz. 2. c. xxvi))
London Passenger Transport (Interim Financial Arrangements) Act 1934	24 & 25 Geo. 5. c. lix	12 July 1934
An Act to make provision regulating the financial arrangements of the London Passenger Transport Board pending the confirmation or settlement of a pooling scheme under the London Passenger Transport Act 1933 (Note: London Passenger Transport Act 1933 (23 & 24 Geo. 5. c. 14)) and the determination of the amounts and classes of transport stock to be issued as consideration for the transfer to the Board of certain undertakings and parts of undertakings and for other purposes.
Newport Corporation (General Powers) Act 1934	24 & 25 Geo. 5. c. lx	12 July 1934
An Act to remove certain restrictions against the erection of buildings applicable to the Old Cemetery Newport to confer further powers upon the Newport Corporation in relation to their water and electricity undertakings and other matters to make better provision for the health local government improvement and finance of the borough and for other purposes.
Ministry of Health Provisional Order Confirmation (Leek) Act 1934	24 & 25 Geo. 5. c. lxi	25 July 1934
An Act to confirm a Provisional Order of the Minister of Health relating to the urban district of Leek.
	Leek Order 1934 Provisional order partially repealing and amending certain local Acts and provisional orders.	
Ministry of Health Provisional Order Confirmation (Sheppey Water) Act 1934 (repealed)	24 & 25 Geo. 5. c. lxii	25 July 1934
An Act to confirm a Provisional Order of the Minister of Health relating to the Sheppey Water and Lighting Company Limited. (Repealed by Kent Water Act 1955 (4 & 5 Eliz. 2. c. xi))
	Sheppey Water Order 1934 Provisional order under the Gas and Water Works Facilities Act 1870 and the Gas and Water Works Facilities Act 1870 Amendment Act 1873 confirming the construction of waterworks by the Sheppey Water and Lighting Company Limited and for other purposes.	
Ministry of Health Provisional Order Confirmation (Stoke-on-Trent) Act 1934 (repealed)	24 & 25 Geo. 5. c. lxiii	25 July 1934
An Act to confirm a Provisional Order of the Minister of Health relating to the city of Stoke-on-Trent. (Repealed by Staffordshire Act 1983 (c. xviii))
	Stoke-on-Trent Order 1934 Provisional Order to enable the Stoke-on-Trent Corporation to put in force the compulsory clauses of the Lands Clauses Acts.	
Ministry of Health Provisional Order Confirmation (Weymouth and Portland Joint Hospital District) Act 1934	24 & 25 Geo. 5. c. lxiv	25 July 1934
An Act to confirm a Provisional Order of the Minister of Health relating to the Weymouth and Portland Joint Hospital District.
	Weymouth and Portland Joint Hospital Order 1934 Provisional order forming a united district under section 279 of the Public Health Act 1875. (Note: Public Health Act 1875 (38 & 39 Vict. c. 55))	
Ministry of Health Provisional Order Confirmation (Wey Valley Water) Act 1934	24 & 25 Geo. 5. c. lxv	25 July 1934
An Act to confirm a Provisional Order of the Minister of Health relating to the Wey Valley Water Company.
	Wey Valley Water Order 1934 Provisional order under the Gas and Water Works Facilities Act 1870 and the Gas and Water Works Facilities Act 1870 Amendment Act 1873 empowering the Wey Valley Water Company to raise additional capital and for other purposes.	
Ministry of Health Provisional Order Confirmation (Wycombe and District Joint Hospital) Act 1934	24 & 25 Geo. 5. c. lxvi	25 July 1934
An Act to confirm a Provisional Order of the Minister of Health relating to the Wycombe and District Joint Hospital District.
	Wycombe and District Joint Hospital Order 1934 Provisional order forming a united district under section 279 of the Public Health Act 1875.	
Ministry of Health Provisional Order Confirmation (South Middlesex and Richmond Joint Hospital District) Act 1934	24 & 25 Geo. 5. c. lxvii	25 July 1934
An Act to confirm a Provisional Order of the Minister of Health relating to the South Middlesex and Richmond Joint Hospital District.
	South Middlesex and Richmond Joint Hospital Order 1934 Provisional Order forming a united district under section 279 of the Public Health Act 1875.	
Ministry of Health Provisional Order Confirmation (Herriard and District Water) Act 1934	24 & 25 Geo. 5. c. lxviii	25 July 1934
An Act to confirm a Provisional Order of the Minister of Health relating to the Herriard and Lasham Water Company Limited.
	Herriard and District Water Order 1934 Provisional Order under the Gas and Water Works Facilities Act 1870 and the Gas and Water Works Facilities Act 1870 Amendment Act 1873 for empowering the Herriard and Lasham Water Company Limited to maintain Waterworks and to supply Water in parts of the Rural Districts of Alton and Basingstoke in the County of Southampton.	
Glasgow Corporation Order Confirmation Act 1934	24 & 25 Geo. 5. c. lxix	25 July 1934
An Act to confirm a Provisional Order under the Private Legislation Procedure (Scotland) Acts 1899 and 1933 relating to Glasgow Corporation
	Glasgow Corporation Order 1934 Provisional Order to authorise the Corporation of the city of Glasgow to provide and work trolley vehicles to make further provision with respect to the removal and disposal of refuse and the licensing of buildings used for entertainments to empower the Corporation to borrow further money for police purposes and for their tramway undertaking and for other purposes.	
London, Midland and Scottish Railway Order Confirmation Act 1934	24 & 25 Geo. 5. c. lxx	25 July 1934
An Act to confirm a Provisional Order under the Private Legislation Procedure (Scotland) Acts 1899 and 1933 relating to the London Midland and Scottish Railway.
	London, Midland and Scottish Railway Order 1934 Provisional Order to authorise the London Midland and Scottish Railway Company to acquire lands in Scotland to extend the time for the completion of certain authorised railways and works and for the purchase of lands and for other purposes.	
Rotherham Corporation (Trolley Vehicles) Order Confirmation Act 1934 (repealed)	24 & 25 Geo. 5. c. lxxi	25 July 1934
An Act to confirm a Provisional Order made by the Minister of Transport under the Rotherham Corporation Act 1928 (Note: Rotherham Corporation Act 1928 (18 & 19 Geo. 5. c. cxi)) relating to Rotherham Corporation trolley vehicles. (Repealed by Statute Law (Repeals) Act 1989 (c. 43))
	Rotherham Corporation (Trolley Vehicles) Order 1934 Order authorising the mayor aldermen and burgesses of the county borough of Rotherham to use trolley vehicles upon additional routes in the borough of Rotherham and in the urban district of Greasbrough and the rural districts of Rotherham and Wortley in the West Riding of the county of York.	
Torquay Corporation Act 1934	24 & 25 Geo. 5. c. lxxii	25 July 1934
An Act to empower the Corporation of Torquay to construct additional waterworks to execute street improvements and to acquire lands to authorise the acquisition by the Corporation of certain lands and to make special provision with regard to the use management control and development of the said lands and certain other lands belonging to the Corporation to confer further powers upon the Corporation with respect to their water harbour and electricity undertakings to make further and better provision in relation to the improvement health local government and finance of the borough and for other purposes.
Chailey Rural District Council Act 1934	24 & 25 Geo. 5. c. lxxiii	25 July 1934
An Act to confer powers on the Chailey Rural District Council with reference to the construction of waterworks and the supply of water and for other purposes.
Sunderland and South Shields Water Act 1934	24 & 25 Geo. 5. c. lxxiv	25 July 1934
An Act to extend the periods for the completion of certain works to confer additional powers on the Sunderland and South Shields Water Company and for other purposes.
Lowestoft Corporation Act 1934	24 & 25 Geo. 5. c. lxxv	25 July 1934
An Act to define the seaward boundary of the borough of Lowestoft to provide for the leasing of part of the pier known as the South Pier by the London and North Eastern Railway Company to the mayor aldermen and burgesses of the said borough and to empower the said mayor aldermen and burgesses to maintain and manage the premises so leased to them to confer further powers upon the said mayor aldermen and burgesses with regard to the supply of electricity and the health local government and improvement of the borough and for other purposes.
Tynemouth Corporation Act 1934	24 & 25 Geo. 5. c. lxxvi	25 July 1934
An Act to empower the mayor aldermen and burgesses of the borough of Tynemouth to construct additional waterworks and a street improvement to confer further powers upon them and make further provision with respect to their water and electricity undertakings to make further provision for the health local government improvement and finance of the borough and for other purposes.
North Wales Electric Power Act 1934	24 & 25 Geo. 5. c. lxxvii	25 July 1934
An Act to confer further powers on the North Wales Power Company Limited and for other purposes.
Tyne Improvement Act 1934	24 & 25 Geo. 5. c. lxxviii	25 July 1934
An Act to alter the constitution of the Tyne Improvement Commission to consolidate with amendments the enactments relating to the appointment and election of the Tyne Improvement Commissioners and the auditors of their accounts to confer further powers on and to amend the Acts relating to the Commissioners and for other purposes.
Wantage Urban District Council Act 1934	24 & 25 Geo. 5. c. lxxix	25 July 1934
An Act to transfer to the Urban District Council of Wantage the undertaking of the Wantage and District Water Company, Limited; to authorise the Council to supply water, and for other purposes.
Public Works Facilities Scheme (Penicuik Water) Confirmation Act 1934 (repealed)	24 & 25 Geo. 5. c. lxxx	31 July 1934
An Act to confirm a Scheme under the Public Works Facilities Act, 1930, relating to Penicuik Water. (Repealed by Edinburgh Corporation Order Confirmation Act 1958 (7 & 8 Eliz. 2. c. v))
	Penicuik Water Scheme.	
Public Works Facilities Scheme (Kingston-upon-Hull Corporation Sutton Road Bridge) Confirmation Act 1934 (repealed)	24 & 25 Geo. 5. c. lxxxi	31 July 1934
An Act to confirm a Scheme made by the Minister of Transport under the Public Works Facilities Act, 1930, relating to the Kingston-upon-Hull Corporation. (Repealed by Humberside Act 1982 (c. iii))
	Kingston-upon-Hull Corporation Sutton Road Bridge Scheme.	
Public Works Facilities Scheme (Kingston-upon-Hull Corporation Victoria Pier) Confirmation Act 1934	24 & 25 Geo. 5. c. lxxxii	31 July 1934
An Act to confirm a Scheme made by the Minister of Transport under the Public Works Facilities Act, 1930, relating to the Kingston-upon-Hull Corporation.
	Kingston-upon-Hull Corporation (Victoria Pier) Scheme.	
Clyde Valley Electricity Power Order Confirmation Act 1934 (repealed)	24 & 25 Geo. 5. c. lxxxiii	31 July 1934
An Act to confirm a Provisional Order under the Private Legislation Procedure (Scotland) Acts, 1899 and 1933, relating to Clyde Valley Electricity Power. (Repealed by South of Scotland Electricity Order Confirmation Act 1956 (4 & 5 Eliz. 2. c. xciv))
	Clyde Valley Electricity Power Order 1934	
Alloa and District Gas Order Confirmation Act 1934	24 & 25 Geo. 5. c. lxxxiv	31 July 1934
An Act to confirm a Provisional Order under the Private Legislation Procedure (Scotland) Acts, 1899 and 1933, relating to Alloa and District Gas.
	Alloa and District Gas Order 1934	
Falkirk Electricity Order Confirmation Act 1934 (repealed)	24 & 25 Geo. 5. c. lxxxv	31 July 1934
An Act to confirm a Provisional Order under the Private Legislation Procedure (Scotland) Acts, 1899 and 1933, relating to Falkirk Electricity. (Repealed by South of Scotland Electricity Order Confirmation Act 1956 (4 & 5 Eliz. 2. c. xciv))
	Falkirk Electricity Order 1934	
Stirlingshire and Falkirk Water Order Confirmation Act 1934	24 & 25 Geo. 5. c. lxxxvi	31 July 1934
An Act to confirm a Provisional Order under the Private Legislation Procedure (Scotland) Acts, 1899 and 1933, relating to Stirlingshire and Falkirk Water.
	Stirlingshire and Falkirk Water Order 1934	
Pier and Harbour Orders (Clacton-on-Sea and Saint Mawes) Confirmation Act 1934	24 & 25 Geo. 5. c. lxxxvii	31 July 1934
An Act to confirm certain Provisional orders made by the Minister of Transport under the General Pier and Harbour Act, 1861, (Note: General Pier and Harbour Act 1861 (24 & 25 Vict. c. 45)) relating to Clacton-on-Sea and Saint Mawes.
	Clacton-on-Sea Pier Order 1934	
	Saint Mawes Pier and Harbour Order 1934	
Durham County Water Board Act 1934	24 & 25 Geo. 5. c. lxxxviii	31 July 1934
An Act to extend the time for the construction of the Burnhope Reservoir and other works; to authorise the Durham County Water Board to continue to take water temporarily from the Burnhope Burn; to empower the Water Board to purchase further lands and construct a gauge-weir; to extend the limits of supply of the Water Board and to transfer part of the area within those limits to the limits of supply of the Newcastle and Gateshead Water Company; to make further provision with regard to the payments to be made to the Water Board by the Sunderland and South Shields Water Company in respect of the Burnhope Reservoir, and for other purposes.
Middlesex County Council Act 1934 (repealed)	24 & 25 Geo. 5. c. lxxxix	31 July 1934
An Act to confer further powers on the Middlesex County Council with reference to the acquisition of lands, the protection of streams and other matters, and upon local authority undertakers in the county in regard to the supply of electricity, to consolidate with amendments the provisions relating to the superannuation of the Council's officers and servants, and to make further provision in relation to the preservation of amenities, town planning, the improvement of highways, and the health and local government of the county, and for other purposes. (Repealed by Middlesex County Council Act 1944 (7 & 8 Geo. 6. c.xxi))
Newcastle-upon-Tyne Corporation Act 1934 (repealed)	24 & 25 Geo. 5. c. xc	31 July 1934
An Act to empower the Lord Mayor, Aldermen, and Citizens of the City and County of Newcastle-upon-Tyne to provide trolley vehicle services in the said City and the Borough of Wallsend; and for other purposes. (Repealed by Newcastle-upon-Tyne Corporation (General Powers) Act 1935 (25 & 26 Geo. 5. c. cxxiv))
North Lindsey Water Act 1934	24 & 25 Geo. 5. c. xci	31 July 1934
An Act to constitute and incorporate a joint board consisting of representatives of the county council of Parts of Lindsey, Lincolnshire, the urban district councils of Brigg and Scunthorpe and Frodingham, and the rural district council of Glanford Brigg; to empower the urban district council of Scunthorpe and Frodingham to construct waterworks and to transfer those and other waterworks to the said board; to confer upon the board powers of supplying water, and for other purposes.
Ramsgate Corporation Act 1934	24 & 25 Geo. 5. c. xcii	31 July 1934
An Act to authorise the transfer of the Ramsgate Harbour and harbour undertaking to the Mayor, Aldermen, and Burgesses of the Borough of Ramsgate, and to confer upon them all necessary powers for carrying on the said harbour and harbour undertaking, and for other purposes.
Sheffield Gas Act 1934	24 & 25 Geo. 5. c. xciii	31 July 1934
An Act to make provision with respect to the supply of gas within the limits of supply of the Sheffield Gas Company.
Weston-super-Mare Urban District Act 1934	24 & 25 Geo. 5. c. xciv	31 July 1934
An Act to empower the Urban District Council of Weston-super-Mare to construct waterworks and execute street improvements, and to acquire lands for those and other purposes; to confer upon them further powers with respect to their water undertaking; to make further provision for the improvement, health, good government, and finance of their district, and for other purposes.
Cardiff Corporation Act 1934	24 & 25 Geo. 5. c. xcv	31 July 1934
An Act to empower the Lord Mayor, Aldermen and Citizens of the City of Cardiff to acquire and develop certain lands, and to provide trolley vehicle services in the city; to confer upon them further powers with reference to their water undertaking; to make further provision for the health and good government, and with regard to the finance of the city, and for other purposes.
London Passenger Transport Act 1934	24 & 25 Geo. 5. c. xcvi	31 July 1934
An Act to empower the London Passenger Transport Board to provide certain services of trolley vehicles; to work certain tramways by electrical power on the overhead system; to construct new works and to acquire lands; to revive the powers and extend the time for the compulsory purchase of certain lands and the completion of certain works and to extend the time for the compulsory purchase of certain other lands and the completion of certain other works; to confer further powers on the Board, and for other purposes.
Manchester Corporation Act 1934	24 & 25 Geo. 5. c. xcvii	31 July 1934
An Act to empower the Lord Mayor, Aldermen, and Citizens of the City of Manchester to construct street improvements and waterworks; to make further provision in reference to their several undertakings; the granting of superannuation allowances; and the health, local government, and improvement of the city, and for other purposes.
Land Drainage Provisional Order Confirmation Act 1934	24 & 25 Geo. 5. c. xcviii	16 November 1934
An Act to confirm a Provisional Order made by the Minister of Agriculture and Fisheries relating to a scheme submitted by the Rother and Jury's Gut Catchment Board under section four (1) (b) of the Land Drainage Act, 1930. (Note: Land Drainage Act 1930 (20 & 21 Geo. 5. c. 44))
	Rother and Jury's Gut Catchment Board Drainage Order 1934	

== 25 & 26 Geo. 5 ==
The fourth session of the 36th Parliament of the United Kingdom, which met from 20 November 1934 until 25 October 1935.

This session was also traditionally cited as 25 & 26 G. 5.

=== Public general acts ===
Short title	Citation	Royal assent
Long title
Special Areas (Development and Improvement) Act 1934 (repealed)	25 & 26 Geo. 5. c. 1	21 December 1934
An Act to provide for the initiation, organisation, prosecution and assistance of measures designed to facilitate the economic development and social improvement of certain areas which have been specially affected by industrial depression; for the appointment of Commissioners for those purposes; and for purposes connected with the matters aforesaid. (Repealed by Distribution of Industry Act 1945 (8 & 9 Geo. 6. c. 36))

=== Local acts ===
Short title	Citation	Royal assent
Long title
Hamilton Burgh Order Confirmation Act 1934	25 & 26 Geo. 5. c. i	21 December 1934
An Act to confirm a Provisional Order under the Private Legislation Procedure (Scotland) Acts, 1899 (Note: Private Legislation Procedure (Scotland) Act 1899 (62 & 63 Vict. c. 47)) and 1933, (Note: Private Legislation Procedure (Scotland) Act 1933 (23 & 24 Geo. 5. c. 37)) relating to Hamilton Burgh.
	Hamilton Burgh Order 1934	
Aberdeen Corporation Order Confirmation Act 1934 (repealed)	25 & 26 Geo. 5. c. ii	21 December 1934
An Act to confirm a Provisional Order under the Private Legislation Procedure (Scotland) Acts, 1899 and 1933, relating to Aberdeen Corporation. (Repealed by Aberdeen Corporation (Administration Finance, &c.) Order Confirmation Act 1940 (3 & 4 Geo. 6. c. iii))
	Aberdeen Corporation Order 1934	

== See also ==
- List of acts of the Parliament of the United Kingdom
