= Trolleybuses in Doncaster =

Historical trolleybus system in Doncaster (1928–1963)

Doncaster trolleybus system
- Doncaster trolleybus in Sandtoft Trolleybus Museum

Operation
- Locale: Doncaster, South Yorkshire, England
- Open: 22 August 1928; 98 years ago
- Close: 14 December 1963; 62 years ago
- Status: Closed
- Routes: 6
- Operator: Doncaster Corporation Transport

Infrastructure
- Stock: 47 (maximum)

The Doncaster trolleybus system once served the town of Doncaster, South Yorkshire, England. Opened on 22 August 1928, it gradually replaced the Doncaster Corporation Tramways. By the standards of the various now-defunct trolleybus systems in the United Kingdom, the Doncaster system was a moderately sized one, with a total of 6 routes, all radiating out from the town centre, and a maximum fleet of 47 trolleybuses. The Bentley route was the first to close, on 12 February 1956, and the Beckett Road route was the last to go, on 14 December 1963.

== History ==
Faced with an ageing tramway network, which had suffered from a lack of maintenance during World War I, and from competition by private motor buses afterwards, Doncaster Corporation took the decision to phase out their tramways in 1922, and applied for powers to operate their own motor buses. However, despite running buses on the Wheatley Hills route from 1925, which replaced the trams on the shorter Avenue route, they decided in 1926 that trolleybuses would be more economical, and applied for powers to run them on all of the tram routes, including that to Wheatley Hills, but excluding that to Brodsworth, to the north-west of the town. The powers required were enshrined in the Doncaster Corporation Act 1926, and Clough, Smith & Co. were contracted to modify the overhead wiring. Driver training started in the spring of 1928, using the Race Course route. The overhead wiring was not complete, and for parts of the route, power for the vehicles was obtained by using one trolley boom and a skate running on the tram tracks.

The first trolleybuses began running in public service on 19 August 1928, when they replaced the trams running between North Bridge and Bentley. The new route was longer than the tram route, as it followed a circular course around the New Village. To provide the service, ten trolleybuses were purchased, each with three axles, seating for 60 people, and electrical equipment by British Thomson-Houston. Four were manufactured by Richard Garrett & Sons of Leiston, Suffolk, and six by Karrier-Clough. Karrier had entered into an agreement with Clough, Smith in 1926, and Clough, Smith marketed Karrier-Clough trolleybuses until the agreement was terminated in 1933. The conversion of the Bentley route was an economic success, with revenue from the trolleybuses some 50 per cent higher than it had been on the trams. For subsequent routes, the increase would be about 38 per cent.

Over the next three years, the system expanded to almost its full extent. Routes to Hexthorpe to the south-west and Beckett Road to the north-east were completed in July 1929, while a circular route serving Hyde Park and the racecourse opened in January and March 1930. Motorbuses had replaced trams on the route heading north-east to Wheatley Hills in the 1920s, and were in turn replaced by trolleybuses in March 1931, while in July 1931, the final route heading to the south-west reached Balby. A further 20 Karrier-Clough vehicles were purchased to maintain the services, as well as one of only two vehicles built by the Bristol Tramways and Carriage Company.

37 additional vehicles were purchased from Karrier, who were now selling their own vehicles, during the 1930s. They had three axles and bodywork by Charles H. Roe of Leeds. Such was the profitability of the new system that the Transport Department was able to buy new vehicles out of revenue, without going through the normal channels of obtaining a loan sanction from the Council and the Borough Treasurer, which caused some consternation in the corridors of power. Two small extensions to the system were made during the Second World War. The first was to the Beckett Road route, which was lengthened by about 0.5 miles (0.8 km) in April 1941. Operation was made easier by the provision of a turning circle, rather than the reversing triangle which had served the former terminus. The Balby route was lengthened by a smaller amount in July 1942, and again a turning circle replaced a reversing triangle. Three utility-bodied Karriers were obtained in 1943, which were the first two-axle vehicles to run on the system. They were painted in austerity grey, while a further six similar vehicles obtained in 1945 were painted brown.

By the early 1950s, many of the three-axle pre-war Karriers were showing their age, and consideration was given to abandoning the trolleybus system. But when Mr T Bamford became the new general manager in 1953, he sought instead to upgrade the system. Six of the three-axle vehicles had been replaced in 1952, when an equal number of second-hand vehicles manufactured by British United Traction were bought from Darlington. Bamford sent eight of the utility-bodied vehicles to Leeds, to be fitted with new 62-seat bodies by Charles H. Roe. He then bought vehicles from three other systems, enabling all of the pre-war vehicles to be withdrawn by 1957. Nine Karriers were bought from Southend-on-Sea, and although they were rebodied by 1959, they ran for some time with their original utility bodywork. Eight single-deck vehicles came from the Mexborough and Swinton Traction Company, to be fitted with new double-deck bodywork, and finally, two utility Karriers from Pontypridd were rebodied, completing the transformation of Doncaster's fleet.

=== Demise ===
The nationalisation of the electricity industry after the end of World War II meant that Doncaster could no longer supply power to their own undertaking, and electricity costs rose significantly. The demise of the trolleybus system began in 1956, when extensive roadworks were carried out near to North Bridge, the terminus of the Bentley route. Faced with the need to make significant modifications to the overhead wiring, the decision was taken to replace the service with motor buses, and the changeover took place on 12 February. Similar issues were faced in other parts of Doncaster, and it became increasingly difficult to obtain the spares needed to maintain the vehicles. However, the changeover was rather more gradual, with motor buses appearing on the routes as they became available, resulting in both types of vehicle servicing the same routes. Perhaps most unusual was the Hyde Park and Racecourse loop, where motor buses replaced the Hyde Park service on 10 December 1961, but trolleybuses continued to run one way around the loop until 13 October 1963. The next route to be converted was that to Hexthorpe, where the changeover was completed on 17 March 1962, followed by the Balby route on 8 September, and the Wheatley Hills route on 30 December. After the withdrawal of the Racecourse service, only the Beckett Road route remained, and this continued until 14 December 1963, when the only trolleybus in service, No. 375, ran the final runs.

This was not quite the end for 20 of the vehicles, as the relatively new Roe bodywork was removed, and refitted to motor bus chassis. Some were fitted to new Daimler CVG6 chassis, while others enabled older vehicles to be upgraded. Some structural alteration was made, as a half-cab layout provided easier access to the engines. Additionally, the final trolleybus to run found new life in preservation.

=== Depots ===
The trolleybuses were stabled in a depot on Greyfriars Road, close to the eastern end of North Bridge. This had previously been the tram depot, and the site had originally been chosen as the power station which supplied power for the municipal street lighting scheme and the trams was also located on Greyfriars Road. The main depot building was on the south side of Greyfriars Road, sandwiched between Church View to the east and the public swimming baths to the west. There was a second stabling building on the north side of the road, opposite the baths, which had also been a tram depot. Access for the trams was from Frenchgate, to the west, but trolleybuses could access the depot from either direction, as wiring ran along Fisher Gate to meet the Beckett Road route at Market Place.

=== Preservation ===
One of the former Doncaster trolleybuses, a Charles H. Roe-bodied Karrier W4, is now preserved, at the Trolleybus Museum at Sandtoft, Lincolnshire. The vehicle was one of the final batch of new trolleybuses bought in 1945, and was originally fitted with utility bodywork by Park Royal Vehicles. It carried the number 75 until 1948, becoming 375 as part of a general renumbering scheme. Park Royal's subsidiary, Charles H Roe, fitted new bodywork in 1955. The trolleybus had been adopted by the Doncaster Omnibus and Light Railway Society while still in service, and was loaned to them after it was withdrawn, and formally donated to them in 2005. It became one of the first batch of eight vehicles to be moved to the Sandtoft site in November 1969, and was repainted by Doncaster Corporation in 1971. In remained in store for a long time, but a programme of refurbishment began in 2013, and it was first used to give public rides at the museum in May 2014, although the restoration of the interior was not quite completed at that time. Also at the museum are some contemporary Doncaster motorbuses, single deck Associated Equipment Company Regal III No. 22, Leyland Motors PD2 No.98, and Daimler CVD6 No. 112, which is fitted with Roe lowbridge bodywork. With a sunken upstairs gangway on the offside, it is the only Doncaster lowbridge vehicle to survive, and the only lowbridge bus owned by the museum.

Two of the Darlington vehicles, which were bought in 1952 and operated until 1959, when they were sold to Bradford, have also been preserved. No.834 is at Sandtoft, while No.835 is in private ownership and is stored at the North East Aircraft Museum at Washington, Sunderland. At Bradford they were fitted with new forward-entrance bodywork by East Lancashire Coachbuilders. Sandtoft's vehicle was withdrawn in 1971, but held in reserve until the Bradford system closed in 1972, after which it was preserved by the BUT834 Group, which eventually became the British Trolleybus Association. It has since passed into the ownership of the Sandtoft Museum.

== Doncaster Racecourse experiment ==
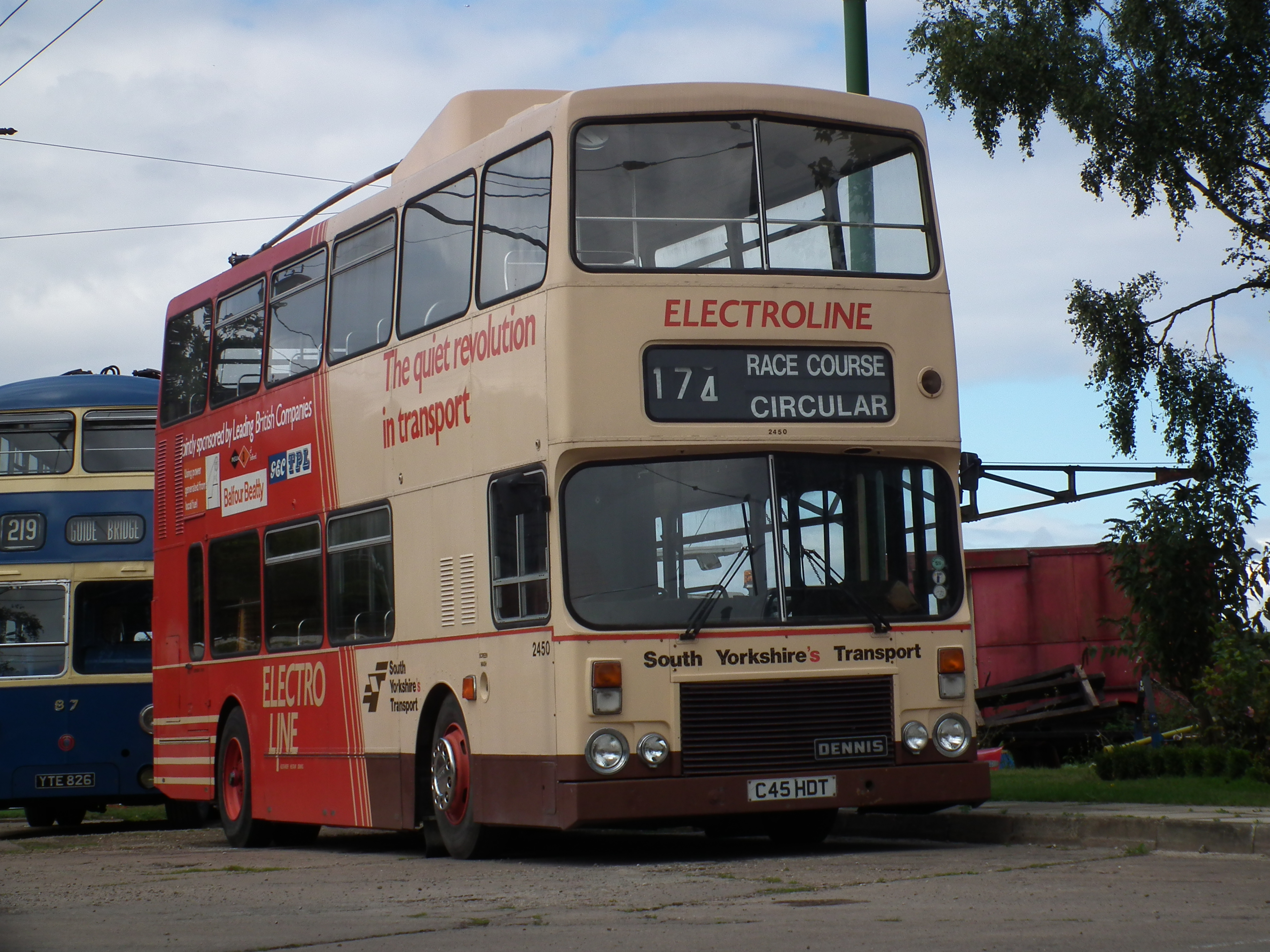
A view of the experimental trolleybus at Sandtoft Trolleybus Museum

In 1984, the South Yorkshire Passenger Transport Executive (SYPTE) sponsored the building of an experimental trolleybus, in connection with plans to reintroduce trolleybuses on four bus routes in Doncaster and two in Rotherham. This vehicle had a chassis built by Hestair Dennis, adapted from the standard Dennis Dominator chassis. The body was based on the Alexander 80 seat body, adapted with trolleybooms. Unusually for a British trolleybus, it included an auxiliary Diesel engine (a 48 hp 3DA Dorman) for moving away from traction wires. It had a GEC Traction traction motor and was capable of running at 40 miles per hour (64 km/h).

Balfour Beatty were employed to erect the overhead wiring, which was supplied with power at 600 V DC from a substation at the nearby SYPTE Leicester Avenue depot. Testing began in August 1985, on a mile-long test route alongside Doncaster Racecourse. This went from a turning circle at the end of the (private) Sandall Beat Road, alongside the racecourse, and then across Leger Way into the SYPTE bus depot. On 8 September 1985 it operated its only revenue-earning passenger service, and the vehicle is reported to have proved satisfactory in operation.

The project was shelved in 1986 due to bus deregulation as this would mean any trolleybuses would have no protection from competing operators, and the wiring was removed in September 1993. After the experiment finished, the vehicle was preserved, and as of 2016 is at the Trolleybus Museum at Sandtoft awaiting electrical repairs.

== Fleet ==
The fleet began with the purchase of four 3-axle vehicles from Richard Garrett & Sons and six similar Karrier-Clough vehicles from Clough, Smith in 1928. All were fitted with H32/28R bodywork by Charles H. Roe and electrical equipment by British Thomson-Houston. The Karrier-Clough trolleybuses were the first batch of model E6 chassis produced by the joint venture between Karrier and Clough, Smith. This led to a further 21 similar Karrier-Clough vehicles being purchased, a batch of six in 1929, seven in 1930, seven in 1931 and one in 1933. The chassis of this last vehicle was chromium plated, as it had been exhibited at the 1933 Commercial Motor Show before Charles Roe built the bodywork, and it became No.32 in the fleet. The early vehicles all had the front of the upper deck set back behind the driver's cab, and the ventilation louvre for the upper deck was protected from rain by the roof projecting forwards to form a hood. No.32 was the first Doncaster vehicle to have a more modern design, where the upper deck extended the full length of the vehicle, following technical input from Mr T Potts, the general manager since 1920.

The only exception to this policy of buying from Karrier was the purchase of one vehicle built by Bristol Tramways and Carriage Company. Doncaster Corporation had been a customer of Bristol since 1922, when they had obtained powers to run motor buses, and had purchased their first six vehicles from the company. Doncaster encouraged Bristol to offer a 3-axle trolleybus as part of their range, and Bristol exhibited two 6W chassis at the 1929 Commercial Vehicle Show, one with a petrol engine, and the second with an electric motor. Subsequently, an H32/28 body was fitted by Charles Roe of Leeds, and after this work was completed on 21 August 1930, it was moved to Doncaster for extended trials later that month. It remained on loan until 11 February 1932, when it was purchased, becoming No.31. A second trolleybus chassis was built by Bristol in 1930, moved to Pontypridd for testing in 1931, and became their No.9 in 1932, but no further trolleybuses were built by the company.

In early 1935, a Leyland Motors demonstrator was tried out on the system. It carried a white livery, but there were consistent reliability problems with it. Buckley suggests that there were similar problems with the Bristol experiment, but whereas Bristol gave up, Leyland persisted and supplied trolleybuses to a number of operators once the issues had been resolved. Doncaster however stuck with what they knew, and another four batches of Karrier E6 vehicles were purchased in the 1930s, comprising numbers 33 to 68. Karrier were by this time marketing their own vehicles, the agreement with Clough, Smith having formally ended in March 1933, but despite plenty of orders, they appointed a receiver in June 1934, and were taken over by Humber Ltd, part of Rootes Securities. Trolleybus manufacture had moved from Huddersfield to the Sunbeam factory in Wolverhampton by July 1935, and most of Doncaster's vehicles were built there. The vehicles were similar to previous models purchased, apart from the fact that the electrical equipment was supplied by Metropolitan-Vickers (Metrovick). Four vehicles arrived in 1935, six in 1936, six in 1937, and the final batch of 20 in 1939. No.37, part of the batch supplied in 1936, had been built in time for the 1935 Commercial Motor Show, and was part of the last batch built in Huddersfield. There was a brief lull in purchasing at the start of the Second World War, but three more batches of three Karriers, this time the model W, were obtained in the latter stages. Nos.69 to 71 arrived in 1943, with utility bodywork by Park Royal Vehicles, Nos.72 to 74 dating from 1945 had utility bodywork by Brush, and Park Royal again supplied utility bodywork for Nos.75 to 77, also in 1945. These purchases allowed Nos.1 to 32 to be withdrawn, leaving a fleet of 45 fairly new vehicles.

The final batch of Karriers from 1945 were the last new vehicles bought by the Corporation. British United Traction had built six trolleybuses for the Darlington system in 1949, despite the fact that they had decided to replace their trolleybuses in 1947, and these were sold on to Doncaster in 1952. They became Nos.378 to 383 in the fleet, since vehicles 32 to 77 had been renumbered 332 to 377 in 1948. When T Bamford took over as general manager in 1953, he still saw a future for the trolleybuses, and Charles Roe rebodied eight of the nine wartime utility Karriers with new 62-seat bodies. Next, Bamford embarked on purchasing a total of 19 second hand vehicles from other operators, in four batches. Nine vehicles came from Southend-on-Sea in 1954, and were rebodied between 1956 and 1959 with seating for an extra four passengers. They were Sunbeam model W vehicles with UH30/26R utility bodywork, one by Brush and the other eight by Park Royal.

Next to arrive were six single deck Sunbeam W vehicles from the Mexborough and Swinton Traction Company. These had been built in 1943 with 32-seat centre entrance bodywork by Brush, and were sold to Doncaster in 1954, although they did not enter service until 1955, as new double deck 62-seat bodies were fitted by Charles Roe. Two vehicles were obtained from Pontypridd in 1957. They had been supplied as Karrier W chassis with Roe 56-seat utility bodywork in 1946, where they ran as Nos.10 and 11, but were listed as Sunbeam W vehicles at Doncaster, where they became Nos.351 and 352, earlier vehicles with those fleet numbers having been withdrawn. Sunbeam was the logical successor to Karrier, since Karriers had been made in the Sunbeam factory since 1935, and Sunbeam was sold on to the Brockhouse Group in 1946, with Rootes retaining the rights to the Karrier name, for use on vehicles for local authorities. The final two vehicles were again from Mexborough and Swinton and were similar to those purchased in 1954, but were from a batch built in 1947. They had been Nos.14 and 18 at Mexborough and Swinton, but were given fleet numbers 353 and 354 after the single deck bodies had been replaced by double deck structures by Charles Roe in 1958.

A number of vehicles operated briefly on other systems. On 19 June 1955, No.362 was driven to Balby, and then towed by a Corporation breakdown truck to Thrybergh, where it was connected to the Rotherham system. Rotherham at the time only ran single deck trolleybuses, and wanted to check whether there was enough clearance for double deck vehicles. Following the trials, twenty vehicles were rebuilt with double deck bodywork, and continued running until 1965. Some 25 years earlier, Karrier had borrowed two trolleybuses in 1930/31 to demonstrate them in Mexborough, Nottingham, York and Johannesburg.

As the service contracted, some vehicles saw further service elsewhere. The six Darlington vehicles, bought second-hand in 1952, were sold to Bradford in 1959, where five of them were fitted with H37/29R bodywork by East Lancashire Coachbuilders in 1962. They were finally withdrawn in 1972. The sixth vehicle, No.378, was used as a source of spares, and did not operate at Bradford.

List of vehicles
Fleet numbers	Type	In service	Withdrawn	Chassis	Electrical equipment	Bodywork
1-4	3-axle	1928	1943-45	Garrett	BTH	Roe H32/28R
5-30	3-axle	1928-31	1943-45	Karrier-Clough E6	BTH	Roe H32/28R
31	3-axle	1931	1945	Bristol 6W	BTH	B/Roe H32/28R
32	3-axle	1933	1945	Karrier E6	BTH	Roe H32/28R
33-68	3-axle	1935-1939	1952-57	Karrier E6	Metrovick	Roe H32/28R
69-71	2-axle	1943	1961-63	Karrier W	Metrovick	Park Royal UH30/26R
72-74	2-axle	1943	1961-63	Karrier W	Metrovick	Brush UH30/26R
75-77	2-axle	1943	1961-63	Karrier W	Metrovick	Park Royal UH30/26R
378-83	2-axle	1952	1961-63	British United Traction 9611T	English Electric	East Lancs H30/26R
384-92	2-axle	1954	1961-63	Sunbeam W	BTH	Roe H34/28R
393-98	2-axle	1955	1961-63	Sunbeam W	Metrovick	Roe H34/28R
351-52	2-axle	1957	1961-63	Sunbeam W	English Electric	Roe H34/28R
353-54	2-axle	1958	1961-63	Sunbeam W	Metrovick	Roe H34/28R

Bus bodywork designations: key
Prefixes

U	Wartime utility bodywork
B	Bus body single deck
C	Coach body single deck
D	Dual purpose single deck
H	Highbridge body, central upper gangway
L	Lowbridge body, offset sunken upper gangway

Numbers

n	Single deck or total seating
x / y	Upper deck followed by lower deck seating

Suffixes

C	Centre entrance
F	Front entrance
R	Rear entrance
D	Dual entrance

== See also ==
- Transport in Doncaster
- List of trolleybus systems in the United Kingdom
