= Mexborough and Swinton Traction Company =

Transport company in England

Mexborough and Swinton Trolleybuses

Operation
- Locale: Mexborough and Swinton, West Riding of Yorkshire, England
- Open: 3 October 1912
- Close: 2 October 1965
- Status: Closed
- Operators: Mexborough and Swinton Traction Co

Infrastructure
- Electrification: Nominal 600 V DC parallel overhead lines
- Stock: 39 (maximum)

Statistics
- Route length: 11 mi (18 km)

The Mexborough and Swinton Traction Company was the name adopted by the Mexborough & Swinton Tramways Company in 1929 following the introduction of trolleybuses on all its routes. It operated in the West Riding of Yorkshire, England, over routes serving Manvers Main Colliery, Wath upon Dearne and the towns of Rotherham, Rawmarsh, Swinton, Mexborough, Conisbrough and the estate at Conanby.

The first opening took place in 1907 and was owned by the National Electric Construction Co., becoming part of the British Electric Traction Group in 1931.

== History ==
Mexborough and Swinton Tramways Act 1902
- Act of Parliament
- Parliament of the United Kingdom
- Long title: An Act to incorporate the Mexborough and Swinton Tramways Company and to empower that Company to make and maintain tramways and other works and for other purposes.
- Citation: 2 Edw. 7. c. ccxxx

Dates
- Royal assent: 8 August 1902

Mexborough and Swinton Tramways Act 1905
- Act of Parliament
- Parliament of the United Kingdom
- Long title: An Act to extend the time for the compulsory purchase of lands and for the construction of the tramways and works authorised by the Mexborough and Swinton Tramways Act 1902 and the Rawmarsh Urban District Council (Tramways) Act 1900 and for other purposes.
- Citation: 5 Edw. 7. c. xxix

Dates
- Royal assent: 30 June 1905

Text of statute as originally enacted

A tramway connecting Rotherham, Mexborough, Swinton and Denaby had been authorised by an act of Parliament, the Mexborough and Swinton Tramways Act 1902 (2 Edw. 7. c. ccxxx). It was constructed by the National Electric Construction Co Ltd, and operated by its subsidiary, the Mexborough and Swinton Tramways Company, from its opening in 1907, with the private company running its trams over Rotherham Corporation's tracks at the Rotherham end. The company's first attempt at rail-less operation was in 1910 when a Thornycroft charabanc, hired from the Musselburgh Tramways Company, was tried for a short period, operating between the Old Toll Bar at Mexborough and Denaby Main Colliery Village, and also from Mexborough to Wath via Manvers Main Colliery. Objections from Mexborough Council caused the withdrawal of the service.

Mexborough and Swinton Tramways (Railless Traction) Act 1913
- Act of Parliament
- Parliament of the United Kingdom
- Long title: An Act to authorise the Mexborough and Swinton Tramways Company to provide and work trolley vehicles in connection with their tramways and for other purposes.
- Citation: 3 & 4 Geo. 5. c. lxvii

Dates
- Royal assent: 15 August 1913

Text of statute as originally enacted

In 1912, the company turned its attention to "rail-less traction" and set a bill before Parliament to authorise five trolleybus routes. These were to run from an interchange with the tramway near the Woodman Inn at Swinton north-westwards to Wath-upon-Dearne; westwards from Wath to West Melton; northwards from Wath to Goldthorpe; from the Denaby tram terminus eastwards to Conisbrough; and from Mexborough westwards to Manvers Main. At the time, local councils were considering constructing their own tramway or trolleybus system, and so opposed the scheme. When the Mexborough and Swinton Tramways (Railless Traction) Act 1913 (3 & 4 Geo. 5. c. lxvii) received royal assent, it only included authority to build the last two of the five routes. Construction began, and both routes opened on 31 August 1915, although they were physically isolated from each other. The three single-deck vehicles obtained for the opening and a few trams were stored in a new depot at Old Toll Bar, but there were only tram wires from the depot to the start of the Manvers Main route at Mexborough. The trolleybuses reached there with one trolley boom on the overhead wire and a skate running along the tram tracks to complete the circuit. They also used this method to reach the main depot at Rawmarsh, when they were in need of maintenance.

The first route from Mexborough town centre to Manvers failed to reach the main gates of the colliery due to a low bridge below the Midland Railway line, while the second ran from the Old Toll Bar to Conisbrough. Manvers is the only locality in England to have had a trolleybus before a tramway. The system was known as the "Trackless" to the locals.

The system did not operate for very long, closing after a few months, largely because so many of the staff were called up to fight in the First World War. The company tried hard to maintain the route to Manvers Main, since colliery working was deemed to be an essential occupation, but the service was at best sporadic, although a second-hand vehicle was purchased in 1917 from the Stockport system to augment the fleet. Conditions did not immediately improve when the war ended, and services only resumed properly on the Manvers route in 1921, with the Conisbrough route following in 1922. Two new vehicles with upholstered seats were obtained in 1922 and another one in 1924. The company also began running motor buses in 1922, and considered whether to convert the trolleybus routes to tramways. They wanted to link their tramway to the Doncaster Corporation system and the Dearne District Light Railway, a street tramway linking Barnsley with the towns of Wombwell, Wath, Bolton on Dearne and Thurnscoe.

Mexborough and Swinton Tramways Company (Trolley Vehicles) Order Confirmation Act 1927
- Act of Parliament
- Parliament of the United Kingdom
- Long title: An Act to confirm a Provisional Order made by the Minister of Transport under the Mexborough and Swinton Tramways Act 1926 relating to Mexborough and Swinton Tramways Company's trolley vehicles.
- Citation: 17 & 18 Geo. 5. c. liii

Dates
- Royal assent: 29 July 1927

Other legislation
- Repealed by: Mexborough and Swinton Traction Act 1960

Status: Repealed

Text of statute as originally enacted

The company's visions for such an extended network of trams were not to be, and they looked instead to convert their tramways to trolleybus routes. To assess what was available, a demonstrator from Richard Garrett & Sons was tried out in December 1925, and another from Ransomes in November 1926. Rotherham Corporation has been running trolleybuses since 1912, but were reluctant to allow Mexborough and Swinton vehicles into the town. However, the two sides reached an agreement in 1926, under which Rotherham would convert its section of tramway ready for trolleybus operation and allow Mexborough trolleybuses to reach the town centre, while Rotherham vehicles could run over Mexborough's routes to various termini. The necessary powers were granted by the Mexborough and Swinton Tramways Company (Trolley Vehicles) Order Confirmation Act 1927 (17 & 18 Geo. 5. c. liii), which also allowed them to extend the system. At the eastern end, the wires were extended from the Dale Road terminus along Low Road to Brook Square. This was known as Conisbrough Low, and the Company were hopeful that Doncaster wiring would eventually extend to that point, enabling the two trolleybus systems to connect. Another route from Dale Road ran up a hill to Conanby, where there was a new housing estate. This was known as Conisbrough High. The Company were also talking to the Dearne District Light Railway about the possibility of them constructing a new route from Bolton on Dearne to Manvers Lane.

The trolleybus service to Conisbrough was withdrawn on 1 January 1928, to allow alterations to the overhead wiring to be made. In just two months, the wiring was ready for testing and they borrowed a Doncaster double-deck vehicle to allow this to take place. The routes to Manvers and Conisbrough were now connected, and services ran from Manvers to Conisbrough Low, and from Mexborough to Conisbrough High. The next section to be converted was the route southwards to the Woodman Inn at Swinton, which opened on 11 November 1928, following a Ministry of Transport inspection two days earlier. Services were re-routed, with trolleybuses from Manvers now running to Conisbrough High, and those from Conisbrough Low running to Swinton. That left the trams running between Swinton and Rotherham, and they were finally withdrawn on 9 March 1929, with trolleybuses running through to Rottherham from the following day. There was a branch along Kilnhurst Road, near the Rawmarsh depot, that allowed short working to be operated to Ryecroft. The Company bought a fleet of new vehicles from Garretts to operate the services, and changed its name to the Mexborough & Swinton Traction Co in 1929, reflecting the fact that they no longer ran trams. They added a turning circle at Conisbrough High in February 1931, to replace a longer loop around a crescent, and opened a branch along Adwick Road, Mexborough on 28 June 1931. This was intended to be the start of a northern extension, but no further progress was made with this. The wires were diverted along a new section of wider and straighter road to the north of Rawmarsh on 28 February 1932, and the final addition to the network saw the Kilnhurst Road branch turned into a loop on 15 October 1934, which was used by services from Rotherham, but operated by vehicles owned by the Company.

As part of the deal that allowed the Company's trolleybuses to run into the centre of Rotherham, Rotherham Corporation vehicles ran out to Kilnhurst, to Conisbrough Low, and to the Adwick Road terminus. Mexborough & Swinton used letters to identify their services, while Rotherham used numbers, apart from their un-numbered service to Templeborough. In some cases, both companies ran vehicles over the same route, which were identified differently depending on who owned the particular vehicle. Thus Mexborough vehicles running between Conisbrough Low and Rotherham were running service "B", while Rotherham vehicles plying the same route were running service "9". The fleet was augmented in 1937, when six second-hand vehicles manufactured by English Electric were purchased from the Notts and Derby Traction Co, and again in 1942 when six 3-axle vehicles made by Guy Motors arrived from Hastings, although not all of this last batch entered service. During the Second World War, the Company bought six utility-bodied Sunbeams in 1943, and after hostilities had ended, bought 33 more Sunbeams in three batches, allowing all of the pre-war fleet to be withdrawn.

=== Demise ===
Following the end of the Second World War a new livery was introduced, starting with the company's six austerity Sunbeam trolleybuses. The red/brown livery which had been carried since the early days was replaced by a brighter green and cream livery. It was well received and the rest of the fleet followed. The first new vehicles to carry the livery were delivered in 1947. Route changes were proposed and first was an application to extend from the Adwick Road terminus in Mexborough to the newly built Windhill estate. It never happened and Windhill was not directly served until the coming of the motor bus route, itself short-lived (December 1948 to June 1953) as the route was unprofitable. The second application was to ease the traffic problems in the narrow streets of Conisbrough and in this respect a new link along Station Road to allow one-way working was proposed, which was in use by March 1948.

The beginning of the end of the trolleybus system started in 1953 when an order was placed for ten Leyland Tiger Cub motor buses with Weymann 44-seat bodywork and front entrances, which arrived the following year. Three other changes took place around that time. To house miners who were moving into the area, particularly from Scotland, the National Coal Board built a new estate, known as "The Concrete Canyon" at Sandhill, Rawmarsh, and, to serve this, a new route between Parkgate and Kilnhurst was developed. This was then extended to the Woodman Inn, Swinton and subsequently to the Cresswell Arms, Swinton. Secondly, a new route was introduced running from Rotherham to the newly built Monkwood estate in Rawmarsh, which joined the main road at the top of Blythe Avenue.

Mexborough and Swinton Traction Act 1960
- Act of Parliament
- Parliament of the United Kingdom
- Long title: An Act to authorise the Mexborough and Swinton Traction Company Limited to discontinue the services of trolley vehicles authorised by the Mexborough and Swinton Traction Acts and Orders 1902 to 1947 and for other purposes.
- Citation: 8 & 9 Eliz. 2. c. xxiv

Dates
- Royal assent: 29 July 1960

Other legislation
- Amends: Rawmarsh Urban District Council (Tramways) Act 1900
- Repeals/revokes: Mexborough and Swinton Tramways Act 1902; Mexborough and Swinton Tramways Act 1905; Mexborough and Swinton Tramways (Railless Traction) Act 1913; Mexborough and Swinton Tramways Act 1926; Mexborough and Swinton Tramways Company (Trolley Vehicles) Order Confirmation Act 1927; Mexborough and Swinton Traction Act 1929; Mexborough and Swinton Traction (Trolley Vehicles) Order Confirmation Act 1934; Mexborough and Swinton Traction (Trolley Vehicles) Order Confirmation Act 1937

Text of statute as originally enacted

The third change, which took place on 27 September 1954, was the replacement of the trolleybuses from Rotherham to Kilnhurst via the Green Lane loop by motorbuses. Bus services expanded rapidly to serve new communities which were developing, and in 1960 the company obtained powers in the Mexborough and Swinton Traction Act 1960 (8 & 9 Eliz. 2. c. xxiv) to cease running trolleybuses and to run motor bus services instead. The Manvers to Conisbrough High route was the first to go, on 1 January 1961, but the rest did not last much longer, and the final trolleybus service ran on 26 March 1961 on the Conisbrough Low to Rotherham route. The following day, four trolleybuses ran in procession to mark the passing of an era. The leading vehicle, No.29, had part of its roof removed to allow a brass band, the Rawmarsh Prize Band, to provide music for the occasion. The Leyland Atlantean buses ordered as replacements were the first double-deck vehicles in the fleet, and the economics of the move can be seen in that they had 72 seats, as opposed to the single deck trolleybuses with 32 seats. The company had been the first private company to operate trolleybuses in Britain, and were also the last to do so.

The Mexborough & Swinton Traction Company Limited developed closer ties with Yorkshire Traction in the late 1960s, as both companies were controlled by British Electric Traction, although British Rail held some of Yorkshire Traction's shares. On 1 January 1969, both companies became part of the National Bus Company, and the Mexborough & Swinton Traction Company was absorbed into Yorkshire Traction on 1 October 1969. Thus ended more than sixty years of service to the Don Valley communities. Upon deregulation in 1986, Yorkshire Traction revived the Mexborough & District name and a YTC style livery (albeit in Green) was applied to a number of vehicles at Yorkshire Traction's Rawmarsh depot. Though, the services were still legally operated by Yorkshire Traction, the M&D livery was seen on services across the Dearne Valley and into Rotherham and Barnsley. Yorkshire Traction did a similar thing with the 'County' name out of its Waterloo depot in Huddersfield. "County' was another bus company that was acquired by YTC in the 60's. The reason for reviving the historic names was to prevent any new operator reviving them when the bus industry was de-regulated.

=== Preservation ===
The end of service was not quite the end for all of the vehicles. The six Sunbeams from 1943 had been sold to Doncaster in 1954, where they had been fitted with double-deck bodies. Twelve of the final vehicles were sold to Bradford, where seven of them received new double-deck bodies in 1963 and were placed in service, and two may have been sold to Teesside, but the records are unclear.

No.34, one of the Garrett single-deck vehicles delivered in 1927, saw further use following withdrawal after the end of the Second World War, first as a caravan, and then as a hay store on a farm. Enthusiasts found it in 1974, and bought it for £35. It is now stored at The Trolleybus Museum at Sandtoft, though in 2014 it was still in its "as-found" condition. It is hoped that it can be restored, although that will involve substantial rebuilding of the bodywork, and none of the electrical equipment remains. Of the vehicles that were sold to Bradford, four have been preserved. No.39 became No.847 in the Bradford fleet, after it had been rebodied, and entered service on 1 March 1963. It was withdrawn in February 1972, but Nos.37 and 38, which became Nos.845 and 846, were used on the final day of operation at Bradford, on 26 March 1972. These three are all at the Sandtoft Trolleybus Museum, and No.845 became the first vehicle to operate from Sandtoft's newly installed overhead wiring in 1972. All three vehicles were awaiting restoration in 2014. The fourth vehicle is No.30, subsequently No.844 at Bradford, which is part of the collection at the Keighley Bus Museum Trust. It carried dignitaries on the final run on the Bradford system, thus becoming the very last trolleybus to operate in Britain. It carries decals to indicate that it was Bradford's and Britain's last trolleybus, and was initially preserved at Sandtoft. In May 1975 it was bought by the West Yorkshire Passenger Transport Executive, and was on loan to the West Yorkshire Transport Museum from 1984. It moved to Keighley when that museum closed.

== Fleet ==
For the opening of the system, the Company bought three single-deck trolleybuses. These were manufactured by Brush, and were built around a model CC 3–4 ton chassis supplied by Daimler, with electrical equipment and bodywork by Brush. They were part of the second order received by Brush for trolleybuses, consisting of six for Phondda and three for Mexborough. Both were subsidiary companies of National Electric Construction Co, and both wanted to run the trolleybuses along sections of tramway, with a skate running along the tram tracks, which posed a problem for Brush, as the patent for under-running trolleys was held by RET Construction Co. Their first order had been for Stockport, which was the only British installation to use the Lloyd-Kohler method of current collection, consisting of two wires arranged vertically and suspended from ornate brackets, which Stockport's Tramway manager had seen in Bremen. A trolley ran along the top wire, and was connected to the vehicle by a flexible cable. This was obviously not suitable for the application, so they used two under-running trolley poles mounted one above the other on the vehicle, an arrangement that had been patented by Estler in 1912. The Stockport system was not a success, and their No. 1 was bought by Mexborough in 1917, but had to be reconfigured before it run on their system.

Only single deck vehicles were used in service, as there were a number of low bridges, and the service to Manvers initially stopped short of the Manvers Main colliery, until the road under the railway bridge could be lowered sufficiently. The four vehicles saw little use, as they were withdrawn in 1922, after the arrival of two vehicles made by Associated Equipment Company (AEC) and another of the same make in 1924. This was another pioneering move for the manufacturer, as AEC were the first company with experience at manufacturing petrol chassis rather than tramway equipment to supply trolleybuses. Their first model was the 602, which was deliberately kept simple to aid maintenance, and had a single 33.5 hp (25.0 kW) motor made by British Thomson-Houston and rheostatic control. Six were manufactured, with three going to Mexborough. Richard Garrett & Sons were a brief player in trolleybus manufacturing, starting in 1925 and folding in 1931. Following their appearance at the Commercial Motor Show in November 1927, they had received an order from Doncaster Corporation for four three-axle 60-seat vehicles. The first one to be completed was tested on the Mexborough system in March 1928, although it was unregistered at the time, and ran using trade plates. As the system expanded in the late 1920s, 30 Garrett type O vehicles were purchased between 1928 and 1930. Electrical equipment was by British Thomson-Houston with bodywork by Garrett. They had a centre entrance for the passengers, and like all subsequent vehicles, 32 seats. The six English Electric vehicles purchased second-hand from Notts and Derby in 1937 departed from the standard layout by having front entrances. Six more second-hand vehicles came from Hastings in 1943, and although they were given fleet numbers from 70 to 75, only Nos. 71, 74 and 75 were actually used in public service, and then only until the end of the Second World War. They were the only three-axle vehicles that the company ran, all the rest having two axles.

A batch of six utility-bodied Sunbeams were delivered in 1943, but were sold on to Doncaster in 1954, where they ran until 1961–63 after they had been fitted with new double-deck H34/28R bodywork by Charles H. Roe. Between 1948 and 1950, all of the pre-war vehicles were withdrawn following the purchase of 33 Sunbeams, 12 of which were sold to Bradford when the system closed, where seven were fitted with H37/29B bodywork by East Lancashire Coachbuilders, and the rest used for spares. Joyce et.al. also state that two vehicles, Nos. 38 and 39, were sold to Teesside, but they do not appear in the Teesside fleet listing, so they may also have been bought for spares.

List of vehicles
| Fleet numbers | Type | In service | Withdrawn | Chassis | Electrical equipment | Bodywork |
|---|---|---|---|---|---|---|
| 21–23 | 2-axle | 1915 | 1922 | Daimler/Brush | Brush | Brush B28R |
| 24 | 2-axle | 1917 | 1922 | Daimler/Brush | Brush | Brush B28R |
| 25–26 | 2-axle | 1922 | 1929 | AEC 602 | Brush | Brush B36R |
| 31 | 2-axle | 1924 | 1929 | AEC 602 | Brush | Brush B36R |
| 34–39 | 2-axle | 1928 | 1945–50 | Garrett O | BTH | Garrett B32C |
| 40–48 | 2-axle | 1928 | 1945–50 | Garrett O | BTH | Garrett B32C |
| 49–60 | 2-axle | 1929 | 1945–50 | Garrett O | BTH | Garrett B32C |
| 61–63 | 2-axle | 1930 | 1945–50 | Garrett O | BTH | Garrett B32C |
| 64–69 | 2-axle | 1937 | 1945–50 | English Electric | English Electric | English Electric B32F |
| 70–75 | 3-axle | 1942 | 1945 | Guy BTX | Rees Stevens | Ransomes B32C |
| 1–6 | 2-axle | 1943 | 1954 | Sunbeam W | BTH | Brush B32C |
| 7–24 | 2-axle | 1947 | 1960 | Sunbeam W | BTH | Brush B32C |
| 25–36 | 2-axle | 1947–48 | 1961 | Sunbeam F4 | BTH | Brush B32C |
| 37–39 | 2-axle | 1950 | 1961 | Sunbeam F4 | BTH | Brush B32C |

Bus bodywork designations: key
Prefixes

| U | Wartime utility bodywork |
| B | Bus body single deck |
| C | Coach body single deck |
| D | Dual purpose single deck |
| H | Highbridge body, central upper gangway |
| L | Lowbridge body, offset sunken upper gangway |

Numbers

| n | Single deck or total seating |
| x / y | Upper deck followed by lower deck seating |

Suffixes

| C | Centre entrance |
| F | Front entrance |
| R | Rear entrance |
| D | Dual entrance |

== Bibliography ==
- Official company 60th anniversary handbook, (1962).
- The Mexborough & Swinton Traction Co., by Chas C. Hall, "Buses Illustrated", (Nov.61-Jan.62).
- PSV Circle Fleet History (1984).
- Joyce, J; King, J S; Newman, A G (1986). British Trolleybus Systems. London: Ian Allan Publishing. ISBN 978-0-7110-1647-7.
- Lockwood, Stephen (2011). Trackless to Trolleybus: Trolleybuses in Britain. Adam Gordon. ISBN 978-1-874422-86-0.
- LTHL (2016). "Mexborough & Swinton Traction Co. Ltd. 1907 – 1969" (PDF) (2nd ed.). Local Transport History Library. Archived (PDF) from the original on 4 May 2020.
- Lumb, Geoff (1995). British Trolleybues, 1911–1972. Ian Allan. ISBN 978-0-7110-2347-5.
- Rowe, Bob; Stubbs, Ian (2014). Museum Fleet Handbook. Venture Publications. ISBN 978-1-905304-63-9.
- Turner, Keith (1996). The Directory of British Tramways. Patrick Stephens. ISBN 978-1-85260-549-0.
