= Trolleybuses in Rotherham =

Rotherham trolleybus system
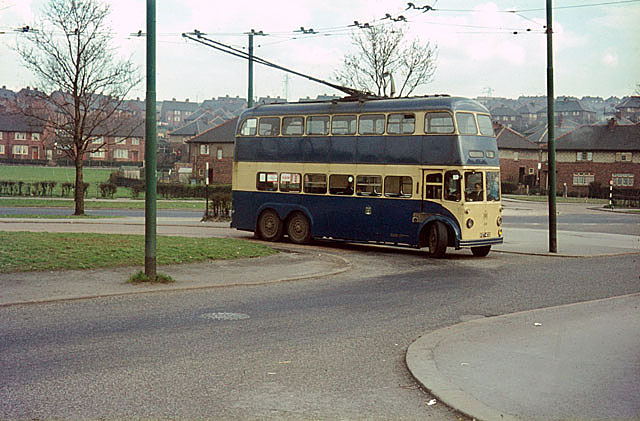
- Trolleybus at the Rotherham Pumping Station turnback, April 1965

Operation
- Locale: Rotherham, West Riding of Yorkshire, England
- Open: 3 October 1912
- Close: 2 October 1965
- Status: Closed
- Routes: 10
- Operator: Rotherham Corporation

Infrastructure
- Electrification: Nominal 600 V DC parallel overhead lines
- Stock: 59 (maximum) in 1950

Statistics
- Route length: 21 mi (34 km)

The Rotherham trolleybus system once served the town of Rotherham, West Riding of Yorkshire, England. Opened on 3 October 1912, it was the fourth trolleybus system to be established in the United Kingdom, after the systems in nearby Bradford and Leeds, which had opened simultaneously in 1911, and Dundee earlier in 1912. Between 1912 and 1949, the Rotherham system gradually replaced the Rotherham Tramway.

By the standards of the various now-defunct trolleybus systems in the United Kingdom, the Rotherham system was a medium-sized one, with a total of 10 routes, and a maximum fleet of 59 trolleybuses. It was closed on 2 October 1965.

The first route to open ran for 4.75 miles (7.6 km) from the Broom Road tram terminus to Maltby. It was Britain's first rural trolleybus route, and most of it was constructed outside of the municipal boundary. It was ranked the fastest trolleybus route in the country in 1927. The next route to open was a joint working with Mexborough and Swinton and was the first joint working between a Corporation and a private company. When it closed, it was the last such joint venture in the country. Trolleybuses replaced the trams relatively slowly and, in two cases, the tramway overhead wiring was altered to allow trolleybuses to run along the same route, with the trams continuing to operate. The final trams were withdrawn, from the joint service with Sheffield, in 1949, and the trolleybuses might well have ceased soon afterwards, but twenty of the Daimler single-deck vehicles were rebuilt with double-deck bodywork, and the extra capacity made them profitable for another ten years. The final trolleybus ran on the day before the 53rd anniversary of the opening.

The Corporation ran an eclectic mix of single-deck vehicles, purchased from seven different manufacturers, and comprising two-axle and three-axle models. The workshops were able to carry out heavy maintenance, in several cases rebuilding rear or front entrance vehicles with a centre entrance, and in one case building a completely new body. Prior to the system closing, four vehicles were sold on to Darlington in 1937, and seventeen of the single-deck vehicles were sold for further use in Spain in the 1950s. Four of the former Rotherham trolleybuses are now preserved, two of the converted double-deck Daimlers at the Trolleybus Museum at Sandtoft, Lincolnshire, a single-deck Sunbeam by the Rotherham Trolleybus Group at Burton upon Trent, Staffordshire, and one of the single-deck Daimlers in northern Spain.

== History ==
Rotherham Corporation had obtained an act of Parliament in 1900 that authorised them to build electric tramways within the borough, and the first routes opened on 31 January 1903. Seven years later, they sent "a small deputation" to view trolleybus systems in Europe, and applied to Parliament for powers to run trolleybuses over a wide area, specifically mentioning six routes. When the act of Parliament was granted, two of the routes, one to Thorpe Hesley, and the other to Brinsworth, Tinsley, Catcliffe and Treeton, were authorised in full, as well as part of a third route, to Wickersley, Bramley and Maltby, but not the continuation from Maltby to Tickhill. Construction of the route to Maltby, starting from the tram terminus at Broom Road, began in 1911, and was ready for inspection by the Board of Trade on 30 September 1912. The installation work was carried out by RET Construction Company, and a formal opening ceremony was held on 3 October, led by the chairman of the Tramways Committee. He was joined by the Mayor and around 180 guests, including the chairman of Leeds Corporation Tramways, who said that the new system was "far and away better" than the one that Leeds had installed in 1911. The route ran for some 4.75 miles (7.6 km), of which over 4 miles (6.4 km) were outside the Rotherham municipal boundary. They thus became the operators of the fourth trolleybus system in Britain, the first rural system, and the first to operate outside of its area.

To run the service, three single-deck vehicles with 28 seats and rear entrances were obtained from Railless in 1912, and another three in the following year. They ran well, despite the rough roads of the rural section, and could maintain speeds of 12 mph (19 km/h) even on the hills. There were difficulties maintaining the vehicles during the First World War, and times when the service had to be withdrawn, so when the Corporation obtained another act of Parliament in 1915, it included powers to convert the trolleybus route into a tramway. After hostilities ended, the Corporation decided that converting at least part of the route from Broom Road to Wickersley was a priority, but this did not take place, and instead, the trolleybus wires were extended from Broom Road to College Square in the town centre, with trolleybuses running over the 7-mile (11 km) route from January 1924. In December 1924, the wires at the Maltby end were altered, extending the service from Hall Estate to the Queen's Head Hotel. In order that the trolleybuses could get to the Rawmarsh Road depot from the Rotherham terminus at Herringthorpe Lane, the tramway manager invented a device that included a steering arm so that the vehicles were guided by the tram tracks. The Rotherham end of the route was unusual, in that trams continued to operate between the town centre and Broom Road for another five and a half years, until they were withdrawn on 10 June 1929.

The Railless trolleybuses had box-like bodywork with open platforms at the rear, but in the early 1920s, they were replaced by six vehicles obtained from Straker-Clough. Although they had similar bodywork, based on tram designs rather than road vehicles, they had enclosed rear platforms. Three more vehicles followed, this time with improved windows and rounded roofs. A number of vehicles had their bodywork altered at Rawmarsh Road depot, when the rear entrances were replaced by centre entrances, an arrangement that became standard for all single-deck vehicles operated by the corporation.

=== Extensions ===
The next extension to the system was influenced more by external factors than internal policies. Rotherham Corporation and Mexborough and Swinton Tramway Company had joined up their tram tracks and operated joint services from 6 February 1907. Mexborough and Swinton had grand designs in the early 1920s, hoping to convert some of their trolleybus routes to tramways, and to connect their system to the Doncaster Tramway and the newly opened Dearne District Light Railway. As the likelihood of this happening faded, they decided to convert their tramways to trolleybus routes, and as a major part of their operation was the joint route into Rotherham Town Centre, they approached the Corporation about their plans. Rotherham were initially opposed to the idea, but consensus was reached in 1926, and Rotherham agreed to replace the overhead wiring on their part of the route, and in return, would be able to operate trolleybuses to termini in Mexborough. An Act of Parliament was obtained by Mexborough to authorise the changes in 1927. Through working began on 10 March 1929, with some new three-axle trolleybuses purchased from Guy Motors operating the routes for the corporation, and Mexborough's Richard Garrett & Sons vehicles becoming a common sight in Rotherham. A formal commemoration ceremony was held on 12 March to celebrate the event. One quirk of the system was that Rotherham used numbers for their routes, while Mexborough used letters, and so vehicles running between Rotherham and Conisbrough Low were operating route "9" if they were owned by the corporation, and route "B" if they were owned by Mexborough.

The next extension to the system was triggered by proposals for major reconstruction of the roads on the route to Thrybergh. Rather than relay the tram tracks in the new road, the Corporation decided to convert the route to trolleybus operation, and to replace the trams on the Kimberworth route at the same time. The work was completed in time for an opening on 17 May 1931, with trolleybuses running through the town centre between Thrybergh in the east and Kimberworth to the west. A batch of 22 new vehicles were ordered from Ransomes, Sims & Jefferies, making this the largest single order that the corporation had ever placed. At Kimberworth, the route was extended from the original tram terminus to the Colin Campbell Inn, while at Thrybergh, the new route left the course of the tramway at Whinney Hill to continue along Old Gate Lane and Park Lane. Shortly after operation began, a new branch was added, enabling trolleybuses to serve Silverwood Colliery. This was about 1 mile (1.6 km) in length, and the idea of running a service to the colliery was not new, as there had been earlier proposals to extend the tramway to its gates. There had also been proposals in 1928 to extend the wires from Thrybergh along the Doncaster Road to Conisbrough, where they could join up with Mexborough's wiring to create a large loop. Other proposals included extending the wires from Conisbrough to join the Doncaster system, so that through services from Rotherham to Doncaster could be operated, but neither of these two proposals ever became more than plans.

Trams on the route to Canklow were withdrawn on 10 July 1934, but were replaced by motor buses, rather than trolleybuses. On the Maltby route, a branch to Worry Goose Lane was created, with a connecting link back to the Maltby route at Brecks Lane. This opened on 28 March 1935, but was not particularly successful, and Worry Goose Lane became a terminus when the route onwards to Brecks Lane was closed in 1939. A new route to Greasbrough, to the north west of the town centre, fared rather better, when it opened on 1 July 1936. It followed the planned route of a tramway extension that had been proposed some years earlier, but never built. Purchasing of new trolleybuses continued, all of them single-deck vehicles with centre entrances, but a mixture of two-axle and three-axle types. 44 three-axle trolleybuses were obtained between 1936 and 1942, from three separate manufacturers, Guy Motors, Associated Equipment Company, more commonly known as AEC, and Sunbeam Commercial Vehicles.

Since 1934, only one tram route had been operating, but this was the route to Templeborough and onwards to Sheffield, worked as a joint service by the two Corporations. Rotherham used single-ended trams for their part of the service, looking similar to double-deck trolleybuses, which they had bought in 1934–35. Although its conversion to trolleybus operation had been actively considered, Sheffield was not keen to introduce trolleybuses, and so the trams remained. Traffic levels increased considerably with the onset of the Second World War, and so the trolleybus wiring was extended along the tram route as far as the boundary at Templeborough. This enabled several cross-town routes to be introduced, with trolleybuses from Maltby, Thrybergh and Kilnhurst Road on the Mexborough system running through to Templeborough. This was particularly useful for those working in the steel industry. Subsequently, trolleybuses ran rather erratically on the route, although the through service of trams continued until 1948, after which they worked to Templeborough for another year, until they were withdrawn on 13 November 1949.

=== Demise ===
One further extension to the system took place on 2 May 1948, when the Kimberworth route was extended to the Toll Bar, but this was relatively short-lived, as the service was cut back to Ewers Road in September 1953. Rising costs and the low capacities of the single-deck vehicles meant that the trolleybuses were becoming uneconomic, and services to Greasbrough ceased in May 1951, with those to Broom Lane following shortly afterwards. The route to Maltby was cut back to Wickersley on 2 May 1954. This had been Rotherham's pioneering route, and had a reputation for speed. A comparison of 16 systems in 1927 showed that Rotherham's was the fastest, and the Maltby route was the only one operating at the time. In 1931, the Ministry of Transport had authorised vehicles to run at up to 30 miles per hour (48 km/h) on the rural route, the first time that such a speed had been permitted. The round trip covered 14 miles (23 km) and was timetabled to take 58 minutes, including a rest period for the crew, and trolleybuses ran every 6 minutes at peak periods. Two batches of new vehicles were purchased from Daimler between 1949 and 1951, based on a three-axle chassis with 38-seat bodywork by East Lancashire Coachbuilders. Comprising 44 vehicles, the orders accounted for almost half of Daimler's post-war production of trolleybuses.

Faced with staff shortages and the poor economics of single-deck vehicles, the new general manager, I O Fisher, decided that larger capacity double-deck vehicles would be more suitable. A double-deck Karrier trolleybus was borrowed from Doncaster, and as the trials proved successful and the Daimlers were comparatively new, some of them were sent to Charles H Roe where new 70-seat double-deck bodywork was fitted to the chassis. The first one was completed in 1956, and the original plan to rebody 14 vehicles was extended, resulting in 20 being converted. Eight single-deck vehicles were retained, for use on the Mexborough services, and the rest were sold for further use in Spain. The extra capacity of the new bodies meant that they were more profitable to operate, but closure was only delayed, rather than prevented. The new vehicles worked on the Kimberworth to Thrybergh service from 7 May 1956, and the Wickersley service from 1 February 1957. The neighbouring Mexborough and Swinton system closed four years later, with the final joint workings taking place on 26 March 1961. This was the last instance in Britain of a joint working between a Corporation and a private company, and had been the first when it was introduced. The demise of the Brecks and Wickersley service took place on 14 January 1963, and the final route from Kimberworth to Thrybergh, with its peak-time branch to Silverwood Colliery and short workings to the Pumping Station survived until 2 October 1965. The system had lasted for 53 years, with its life extended for almost 10 years by the introduction of double-deck vehicles.

=== Preservation ===
Sixteen of the Daimler single-deck vehicles were sold for further use in Spain, fifteen of them going to Cadiz, and one, together with one of the AEC vehicles, going to Tolosa. Of those fitted with double-deck bodywork, the first and the last to be converted are preserved at The Trolleybus Museum at Sandtoft. Both remained in service until the final day of operation. No.37, the first to be converted, was registered as FET 617, has been fully restored, and was running regularly at the museum in 2014. It is owned and maintained by the Rotherham Trolleybus Group, but in 2020 needed some remedial work before it could re-enter service. Following withdrawal, No. 44 was used to provide tours for enthusiasts on the systems at Manchester, Wolverhampton and Bournemouth. It is owned by the museum, and is not normally on display, as although its bodywork is in good condition, it requires a lot of work on its electrical equipment. It was registered as FET 618.

A third vehicle, No. 73, with registration number CET 613, is owned by the Rotherham Trolleybus Group, and is kept at Burton upon Trent. It was originally numbered 88, and was part of a batch of eight Sunbeams with bodywork by East Lancashire Coachbuilders purchased in 1942. It became No.73 in the late 1940s, and in 1950 the bodywork was rebuilt and it became No.74. When it was withdrawn in 1954, many major components were removed, and the shell became a meeting room for the Rotherham Chantry Pistol and Rifle Club. It was rescued in the late 1970s, and stored at Sandtoft, but was transferred to the Rotherham Trolleybus Group in 2001. The group are reconstructing it as it was prior to 1950, and have managed to find many of the missing components, although the trolley gantry, the trolleygear, the roof mounted resistor-case and the contactor panels have had to be built from scratch. They hope to return it to operational condition.

One of the Spanish trolleybuses has also been preserved. It was originally No.84 and carried the registration number FET 344. It was renumbered to become No.2 in 1956, and was the sole Daimler sold to Tolosa. On arrival in Spain, it was rebuilt with a front and rear entrance on the right hand side, although the position of the steering wheel was not changed. When it was withdrawn, it was sold for scrap, and a private collector in northern Spain succeeded in buying it from the scrapyard. It is the subject of a restoration project to return it to operational condition.

== Fleet ==
The first six vehicles obtained by the corporation were from Railless of Hunslet, Leeds, although the company was called RET Construction Co Ltd at the time, after the original Railless Electric Traction Co Ltd overstretched itself and faced financial collapse in 1911. The chassis were made by David Brown, they were fitted with two 20 hp (15 kW) Siemens motors and bodywork by Milnes Voss of Birkenhead. They were renumbered in 1916, becoming T1 to T6 when new trams were acquired, and the original numbers were used for those. No.38 was rebuilt in 1923 with a forward entrance, and ran until 1928, while Nos.42 and 43 were fitted with new centre-entrance 32-seat bodies, built in the Corporation workshops. The rest were replaced in the early 1920s by Straker Clough vehicles. This was a collaboration between Clough, Smith, who worked closely with RET Construction, and Straker-Squire of Edmonton, London. Clough, Smith obtained the chassis from Straker-Squire and fitted electrical equipment by British Thomson-Houston (BTH). Bodywork was then fitted by Charles H Roe, who had taken over RET Construction's works when they had experienced further financial difficulties in 1916. Two Straker Clough vehicles supplied in 1925 were supplied with front entrance bodywork, but these were later altered to centre entrances at Rotherham. Details for this period are a little hazy, as Lumb lists a total of nine vehicles supplied by Clough, Smith between 1922 and 1927, whereas Joyce et al. list eleven, supplied between 1920 and 1925, and the fleet numbers do not match up between the sources. A single trolleybus built by Ransomes, Sims & Jefferies was borrowed from St Helens in 1929 for six days, and four of the Straker Clough vehicles, Nos.39 and 46 to 48, were sold to Darlington in 1937.

For the start of the joint working to Mexborough and Swinton, four three-axle vehicles were obtained from Guy Motors of Wolverhampton in 1928. These were fitted with Rees-Stevens electrical equipment, which consisted of a 60 hp (45 kW) motor mounted at the front of the chassis and a regenerative control system manufactured by Rees Rotubo Co Ltd. A fifth vehicle was delivered in 1930. The trial of the St Helens trolleybus must have been successful, for a batch of 22 new vehicles were ordered from Ransomes, with bodywork by Cravens, for the opening of the routes to Thrybergh and Kimberworth. The Corporation continued their mix-and-match policy, when they bought 10 Guy BT models in 1933–34, of which five had bodywork by Cravens and five by Charles Roberts. Four more Cravens-bodied Guys followed in 1935, and were the last fitted with 32-seat bodies. For the next two batches of six each, obtained in 1936 and 1937, they reverted to the longer Guy BTX three-axle vehicles, fitted with 39-seat bodywork. Similar vehicles were obtained from Associated Equipment Company (AEC) in 1937.

The final trolleybuses purchased before the Second World War were Guy BTX and AEC 664T models, both of which had bodywork by East Lancashire Coachbuilders. During the war years, there was little choice, and two batches of Sunbeams were obtained in 1940 and 1942, with bodywork again by East Lancashire Coachworks. All of these vehicles had 39 seats when built, but were subsequently reseated, reducing the capacity to 38. After the war, the system was re-equipped with Daimlers. These were models CTC6 or CTE6, where the "CT" stood for "commercial trolleybus", the next "C" or "E" indicated that the electrical equipment was by Crompton Parkinson or English Electric and the "6" indicated that they had 6 wheels. A total of 44 entered service between 1949 and 1951, 18 of the CTC6 model and 26 of the CTE6 model. It was these vehicles that were later rebuilt with H40/30R bodywork by Charles Roe, to prolong the life of the system. All of the vehicles chosen for conversion were CTE6 models, and all of the vehicles sold for further duties in Cadiz were CTC6 models. The Daimler sold to Tolosa was the only CTE6 model sold for further use.

The table shows the vehicles operated by the corporation, according to LTHL and Joyce et al. The information is often in conflict, and is not always consistent in a single document. Fleet numbers are those applied when new, but are less useful than for many operators, as most vehicles were renumbered, and some were renumbered two or three times.

List of vehicles
Fleet numbers	Type	In service	Withdrawn	Chassis	Electrical equipment	Bodywork	Notes
38	2-axle	1912	1928	Railless	Siemens	Milnes Voss B26R	rebuilt B26F
39–40	2-axle	1912	1922	Railless	Siemens	Milnes Voss B26R	
41	2-axle	1913	1923	Railless	Siemens	Milnes Voss B26R	
42-43	2-axle	1913	1931	Railless	Siemens	Milnes Voss B26R	rebuilt B32C
38–40	2-axle	1920–22	1933–36	Straker-Clough	BTH	Roe B26C	
44–45	2-axle	1923	1933	Straker-Clough	BTH	Roe B26C	
41–43, 46–48	2-axle	1924–25	1933–36	Straker-Clough		Roe B32C	
49	2-axle	1925	?	Railless		Roe B32C	
50	2-axle	1929	1929	Ransomes, Sims & Jefferies	RS&J/English Electric	RS&J B35C	
43–46	3-axle	1929	1939–40	Guy BTX	Rees Stevens	Roe B32C	
51	2-axle	1930	1942?	Guy BT	Rees Stevens	Roe B32C	ex-demonstrator
55–56, 19–38	2-axle	1931	1939–50	Ransomes, Sims & Jefferies	RS&J	Craven B32C	
52–54, 57–58	2-axle	1933–34	1949–50	Guy BT32	English Electric	Craven B32C	
39–42, 59	2-axle	1933–34	1949–50	Guy BT32	English Electric	Roberts B32C	
15–18	2-axle	1935	1951	Guy BT32	English Electric	Cravens B32C	
60–65	3-axle	1936	1956	Guy BTX	English Electric	Cravens B40C	rebuilt B39C
14, 47–50, 66	3-axle	1937	1950–56	Guy BTX	English Electric	Craven B39C	rebuilt B38C
67–69, 58–60	3-axle	1937	1950–56	AEC 664T	English Electric	Craven B39C	rebuilt B38C
13	3-axle	1937	1956?	Guy BTX	English Electric	Cravens B39C	rebuilt B38C
57	3-axle	1937	1950	AEC 664T	English Electric	Cravens B39C	rebuilt B38C
19–22	3-axle	1939	1950–53	Guy BTX		East Lancs B38C	
23–26	3-axle	1939	1950–54	AEC 664T	English Electric	East Lancs B39C	rebuilt B38C
70–77	3-axle	1940	1949–51	Sunbeam MS2C	GEC	East Lancs B39C	rebuilt B38C
82–89	3-axle	1942	1949–54	Sunbeam MS2C	GEC	East Lancs B39C	rebuilt B38C
75–94	3-axle	1949–50	1954–65	Daimler CTC6 / CTE6	C/Parkinson / Eng Elec	East Lancs B38C	
1–24	3-axle	1950–51	1954–65	Daimler CTC6 / CTE6	C/Parkinson / Eng Elec	East Lancs B38C	

Bus bodywork designations: key
Prefixes

U	Wartime utility bodywork
B	Bus body single deck
C	Coach body single deck
D	Dual purpose single deck
H	Highbridge body, central upper gangway
L	Lowbridge body, offset sunken upper gangway

Numbers

n	Single deck or total seating
x / y	Upper deck followed by lower deck seating

Suffixes

C	Centre entrance
F	Front entrance
R	Rear entrance
D	Dual entrance

== See also ==
- List of trolleybus systems in the United Kingdom
