= Railless =

British trolleybus companies

Railless is the generic name for three companies which made trolleybuses in Britain between 1906 and 1926. Railless Electric Traction Co Ltd was established in 1908, and were at the forefront of the introduction of trolleybuses to Britain. Financial difficulties in 1911 resulted in RET Construction Co Ltd being formed, to take over the business, goodwill and patents of Railless Electric Traction. This company ran out of orders during the First World War, and went into receivership. Charles H. Roe took over the bodywork part of the business, using RET's works in Leeds, and the goodwill and patents were sold to Railless Ltd, a new company which had been set up by Short Bros (Rochester and Bedford) Ltd, and manufacture of the chassis transferred to their Seaplane works at Rochester, Kent.

The trolleybus business was not particularly profitable for Shorts, and production ceased in 1926, allowing them to concentrate on parts of their business that were making a good profit. Between them, the three companies built 115 trolleybuses, of which one, dating from 1923, has been preserved at the Ipswich Transport Museum.

== History ==
The first known demonstration of a trolleybus system was by Werner von Siemens in Berlin, Germany during September 1882. A dogcart was powered by electric motors, and obtained its power from a small trolley running along the top of a pair of overhead wires, connected to the vehicle by a flexible cable. By the early years of the 20th century, workable public transport systems using the concept had been created in France, Germany, Italy and the Austro-Hungarian Empire, and by 1911, 39 systems had been built, including one in Drammen, Norway and one in Hollywood, Los Angeles. Three main methods of current collection were tried, but the Schiemann system, consisting of twin trolley booms running along the underside of two wires, and held there by springs, gained the ascendency. Several transport managers and tramway committees from Britain visited these systems, to assess their usefulness for areas where the cost of building a tramway could not be justified. Against this background, the Railless Electric Traction Company was formed in 1908, and it had the benefit of owning the UK licence for the Schiemann current collection method. The company contracted a chief engineer in Edward May Munro, who was also the managing director of the Bristol-based company Brecknell, Munro and Rogers Ltd. He had designed the trolley arms and bases for Railless, and also held the patents for them. He was assisted by Mr A S Crosley. Metropolitan Electric Tramways were keen to try out the system in London, and in 1909 constructed a roadway with twin overhead wires. There were turning circles at both ends, within the grounds of the Hendon depot and Edgware Road works. Railless provided a 24-seat single deck vehicle, with bodywork by Milnes Voss of Birkenhead, based on a chassis constructed by James and Browne in London. It was powered by two 25 hp (19 kW) electric motors, manufactured by British Thomson-Houston, each one driving one of the back wheels through a chain mechanism. The trials began on 25 September 1909, and these coincided with the Municipal Tramways Association Conference, so delegates visited the system in September, with representatives from local authorities visiting in October. Although Metropolitan Electric Tramways were keen to introduce a public service, they never obtained formal powers to do so, and the demonstration track was dismantled in 1911. It is not known what happened to the trolleybus.

Railless now promoted their system to anyone who would listen, which paid off when the Corporations of Leeds and Bradford both placed orders for a system. The towns worked together to ensure that both systems would open on the same day, and formal ceremonies to celebrate the inaugurations were held on 20 June 1911, with public services on Britain's first trolleybus routes beginning on 24 June. The route in Bradford was about 1 mile (1.6 km) long, with a tram stop at both ends. The Leeds system ran alongside the trams from the city centre, and then diverged into the countryside to reach its destination. Chassis for the vehicles were made by Alldays & Onions Pneumatic Engineering Co Ltd of Birmingham. These were fitted with two 20 hp (15 kW) motors by Siemens, again one for each back wheel, with a complex chain drive to link them together, and bodywork by Hurst Nelson of Motherwell. Leeds bought four vehicles, with front entrances and 28 seats, while Bradford bought two, with the same number of seats but rear entrances. The cost of obtaining or supporting Parliamentary Bills was too large for the company's finances, and so a new company, RET Construction Co Ltd was formed. With additional financial backing, they took over Railless Electric Traction.

One issue with the vehicles for Leeds and Bradford was that they were too heavy and exceeded the allowed weights for road vehicles. RET therefore asked David Brown & Sons to construct lighter chassis. They continued to use Milnes Voss and Siemens for the bodywork and electrical equipment. They were supplying all of the equipment necessary to build a system as well as the vehicles, and bought a factory in Hunslet, Leeds, to aid this. Charles H. Roe was the Chief Draughtsman, and following the demise of Milnes Voss in late 1913, designed bodies with metal frames and aluminium panels. The factory was next to that of Lockwood & Clarkson, who constructed the bodywork from Roe's drawings. From October 1913, traction equipment was obtained from Dick, Kerr & Co of Preston, and in 1914, the cumbersome chain drives were redesigned with a single reduction gear. During this period, RET supplied two trolleybuses to Dundee, six to Rotherham, four to Ramsbottom, one to Mar del Plata in Buenos Aires, six to Boksburg, South Africa, and six to Shanghai, China. A further vehicle for Shanghai, supplied in September 1914, was the first fitted with the new worm drive, and in 1915 they supplied ten trolleybuses to Bloemfontein, together with five unpowered trailer cars, and two more to Ramsbottom.

In 1913 they had also constructed the world's first double-deck trolleybus, which was tested on the Leeds system, running services to New Farnley. As built, the trolley poles were mounted at the front of the upstairs deck, but by the time the vehicle was being tested in Brighton in late 1913, the trolley poles had been moved to the rear of the top deck. Brighton did not proceed with a trolleybus system, and the temporary wiring in the town centre was dismantled. Again, the fate of the double deck trolleybus is unknown. With Europe at war, RET's order book dried up and they faced financial difficulties. In 1915, Boksburg placed an order for two more trolleybuses, but there is no evidence that they were delivered. The North Ormesby, South Bank, Normanby & Grangetown Railless Traction Co also placed an order for ten vehicles in 1915, four of which were nearly complete by the time the company went into receivership in 1916.

The receiver appointed to manage the company's affairs convinced Charles Roe that he should run a coachbuilding business based in the Leeds works, which he successfully did, with the business lasting until 1984. The patents and goodwill of the company were sold by the receiver to Railless Ltd, a company created by Short Bros (Rochester and Bedford) Ltd in spring 1918. They moved production to their Seaplane Works at Rochester, and Edward Munro moved to the new location. The order for North Ormesby was completed and delivered in August 1919, and ran on the Teesside system from November 1919. They supplied four vehicles to York in late 1920, to run on their new system, construction of which had been delayed by the First World War. Because of the narrow streets and tight corners that the trolleybuses had to negotiate, they were only 6 feet 3 inches (1.91 m) wide, and were designed for one-man operation. Passengers dropped their fare into a "pay-as-you-enter" device near the front entrance of the 24-seat body.

Railless received an order for a batch of 12 double-deck vehicles with covered top decks from Birmingham in 1922. Such a large order overstretched the resources of Charles Roe, and the bodywork company was restructured and refinanced to become C H Roe (1923) Ltd. Shorts, who had been making chassis for Railless since 1919, subsequently made the bodywork as well. Railless also received a rather unusual order from Shanghai in 1922, for two chassis which were fitted with conventional trolleybus equipment together with a petrol engine and generator, allowing the vehicles to work where there was no overhead wiring. They carried electric cranes for lifting heavy loads. The traction motors and generators were supplied by English Electric, but the manufacturer of the petrol engine is unknown. They also delivered three single-deck vehicles for Bloemfontein and one for Ramsbottom in that year. In 1923 they supplied three for the opening of the Ipswich system and four for the opening of the West Hartlepool system.

In June 1923, Chief Engineer Edward Munro devoted more time to his consulting business as there were no new orders on the books. He continued to design collector equipment, patenting a new version in 1925 for Railless. Short Bros bought the rest of the share capital and reorganised the company, with the sales department becoming part of their own sales organisation. Shorts then redesigned the trolleybuses, and Railless marketed them. Their design incorporated a much lower floor, at only 2 feet 4 inches (0.71 m), achieved in part by a new design for the back axle. They included brakes on all four wheels, and control by a foot pedal. Orders were received for single deck trolleybuses from Southend-on-Sea, Ashton-under-Lyne, Oldham, and West Hartlepool, while double deck vehicles were built for Nottingham, Birmingham and West Hartlepool. The Birmingham vehicles were just 14 feet 6 inches (4.42 m) high, some 8 inches (20 cm) lower than previous models, and were fitted with hand controllers rather than foot pedals, since other Birmingham vehicles used that system. The double deck model for West Hartlepool was not a success, and was withdrawn after only a year.

Building trolleybuses was never particularly profitable for Shorts, and in 1926 they ceased production of them, to concentrate on more lucrative business. The original Railless company had built seven trolleybuses, RET Construction had built 41, and the later Railless had built 67, of which 28 were the low floor models. This total of 115 vehicles was supplemented by ten tractor vehicles with twin motors and 35 seats, and 15 goods trailers, with a single motor, which were built under licence in France for use on a 31-mile (50 km) route linking Nimes, Remoulins and Vers-Pont-du-Gard. They ran in trains, with a tractor unit pulling up to four trailers.

=== Operation ===
The two vehicles supplied for the opening of the Bradford system were sufficiently successful, that the Bradford Tramways Department decided to construct further trolleybuses to their own design, and built 18 between 1913 and 1918. During the First World War, the two Railless vehicles were converted to "trolley-lorries", with a flat bed instead of the passenger compartment, and were used to ferry goods around the tram system, using one trolley pole on the tram overhead wiring, and a skate running along the tram tracks to complete the circuit.

=== Preservation ===
One Railless trolleybus is known to exist in preservation. It was one of the three supplied for the opening of the Ipswich system in 1923, and following withdrawal in 1934 was sold to become a caravan at Flatford, from where it was obtained by the Ipswich Transport Museum in 1977. It was cosmetically restored by 1981, and around 2007 was fitted with an Estler trolleybase, where the two trolleypoles are mounted one above the other on a central pivot.

== Bibliography ==
- Joyce, J; King, J S; Newman, A G (1986). British Trolleybus Systems. London: Ian Allan Publishing. ISBN 978-0-7110-1647-7.
- Lockwood, Stephen (2011). Trackless to Trolleybus: Trolleybuses in Britain. Adam Gordon. ISBN 978-1-874422-86-0.
- Lumb, Geoff (1995). British Trolleybues, 1911-1972. Ian Allan. ISBN 978-0-7110-2347-5.
- Zebedee, John (2007). "Ipswich Transport Museum". British Trolleybus Society. Archived from the original on 9 January 2017.
