= Dearne District Light Railway =

Tram system in Yorkshire, England

Dearne District Traction Act 1933 (Note: Section 1.)
- Act of Parliament
- Parliament of the United Kingdom
- Long title: An Act to provide the for the abandonment of the railways constructed under the powers of the Dearne District Light Railways Orders 1915 to 1924 and the running by the Yorkshire Traction Company Limited of services of stage carriages in substitution thereof and for other purposes.
- Citation: 23 & 24 Geo. 5. c. xlvi
- Territorial extent: United Kingdom

Dates
- Royal assent: 18 July 1933
- Commencement: 18 July 1933 (Note: The Acts of Parliament (Commencement) Act 1793.)
- Repealed: 16 November 1989

Other legislation
- Repealed by: Statute Law (Repeals) Act 1989

Status: Repealed

[google.com/search?q=Dearne+District+Traction+Act+1933&rlz=1C5CHFA_enGB1186GB1186&oq=Dearne+District+Traction+Act+1933&gs_lcrp=EgZjaHJvbWUyBggAEEUYOTIKCAEQABiABBiiBDIHCAIQABjvBTIKCAMQABiABBiiBDIHCAQQABjvBTIKCAUQABiABBiiBDIGCAYQRRg8MgYIBxBFGDzSAQcxOTVqMGo3qAIAsAIA&sourceid=chrome&source=chrome.ob&ie=UTF-8 Text of statute as originally enacted]

The Dearne District Light Railway was a tramway linking Barnsley with the towns of Wombwell, Wath, Bolton on Dearne and Thurnscoe. Opened on 14 July 1924, it was the last street tramway to be built in the UK before the modern era (starting in the late 20th century) and one of the first to shut. It was granted a light railway order under the Light Railways Act 1896, the Dearne District Light Railways Order 1915, but World War I delayed its opening.

A "car barn" was built at Wombwell, which later became Yorkshire Traction's bus depot, and single deck vehicles were used throughout its nine-year life span. Because of mining in the area the track was laid on wooden sleepers and covered over and was all single track with passing loops, which was the reason for its downfall. When motorbuses started to compete on the same route as the DDLR it was found that because the trams had to wait to pass each other, the bus could complete the journey much quicker and so the electric vehicles had to go.

Very few traces of the former DDLR remain now, as the last tram journey reached the end of the line on 30 September 1933, soon to be replaced by the local bus service. The body of a former DDLR car is still in use as a summer house in a garden on the outskirts of Sheffield.

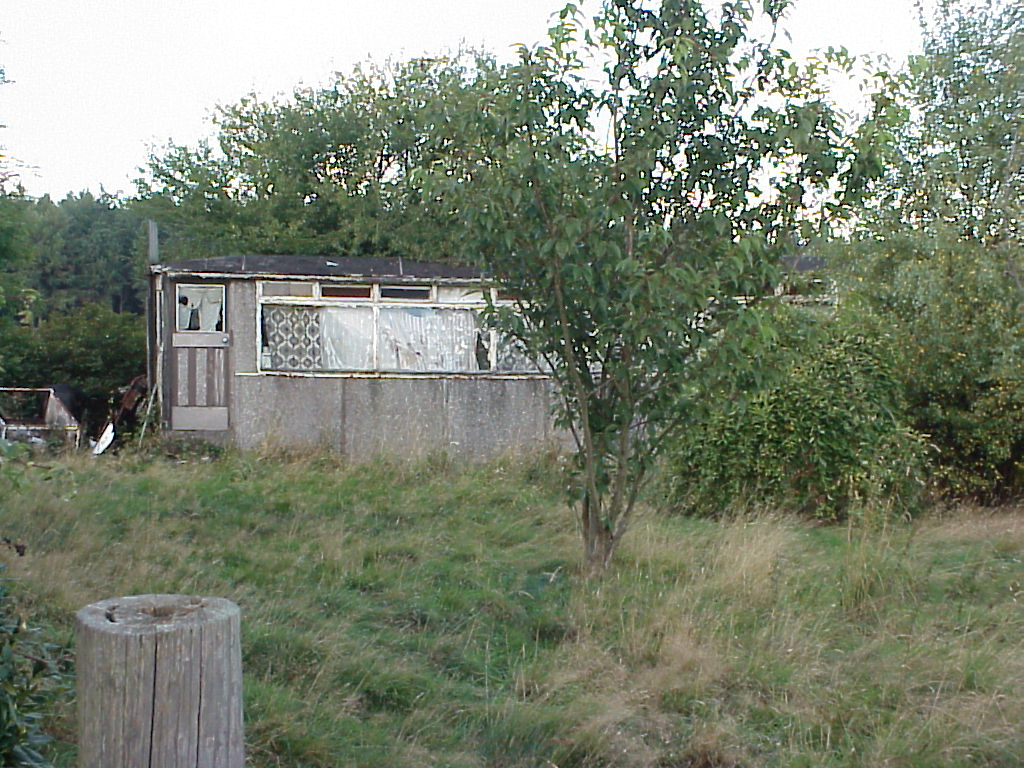
Side view of former DDLR car

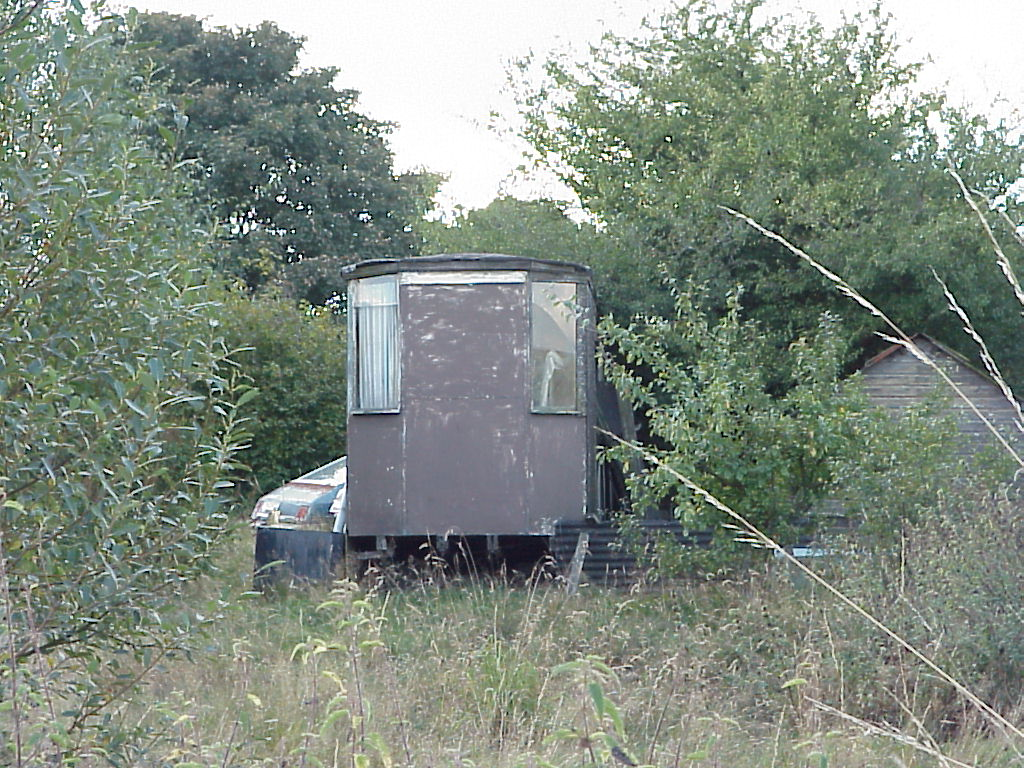
End view of former DDLR car
