= English Electric Balloon =

Class of tram used by Blackpool tram network

English Electric Balloon car
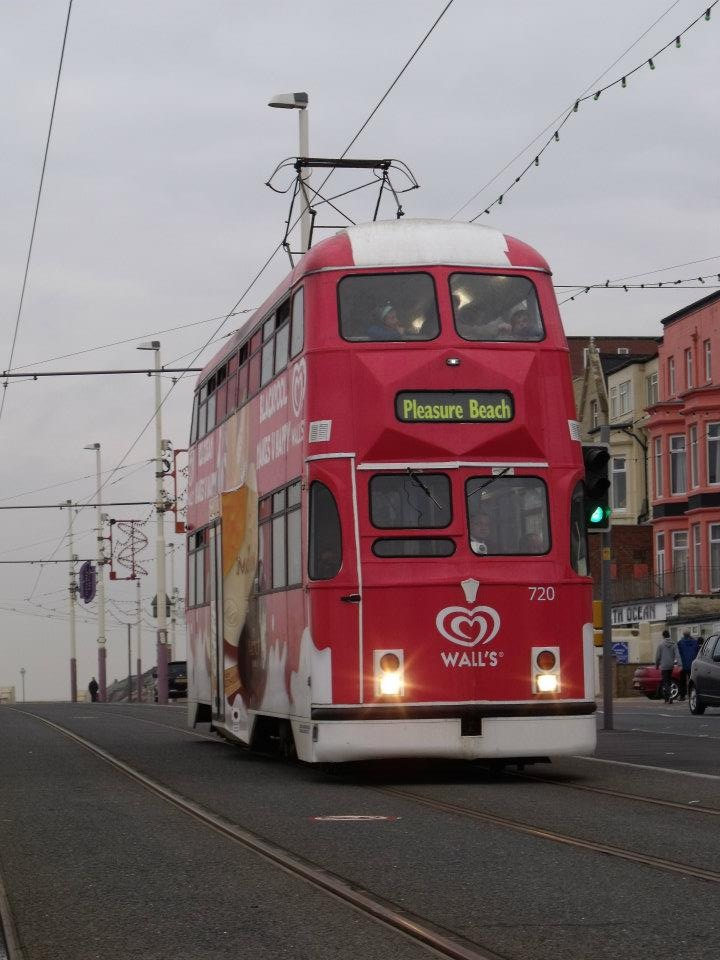
- Modified Balloon tram 720 showing the widened doors.
- Manufacturer: English Electric
- Assembly: Preston, Lancashire
- Constructed: 1934–1935
- Entered service: 1934–present
- Refurbished: 2009–2012
- Number built: 27
- Capacity: 78–94 seated

Specifications
- Car length: 12,878 mm (42 ft 3 in)
- Width: 2,286 mm (7 ft 6 in)
- Floor height: 820 mm (32.28 in)
- Wheel diameter: 686 mm (27.01 in)
- Wheelbase: 4 ft 9 in (1.45 m)
- Maximum speed: 43.5 mph (70 km/h)
- Traction system: EE Z6
- Traction motors: 4 × EE 305/1E 57 hp (43 kW)
- Power output: 228 hp (170 kW)
- Electric system(s): 600 V DC (nominal) from overhead catenary
- Current collection: Pantograph or trolley pole
- UIC classification: Bo′Bo′
- Track gauge: 4 ft 8 1/2 in (1,435 mm) standard gauge

The English Electric Balloon is a type of double-decker tram that operates on the Blackpool Tramway. Initially brought into service in 1934, the Balloon formed the backbone of the Blackpool tram fleet until the tramway's conversion to a modern light rail network in 2012. Following the network's re-opening, nine Balloons were converted to meet the disability regulations to serve as a supplement to the modern Flexity 2 vehicles. Some of the Balloons have been retained for use within the heritage fleet, although their use was temporarily suspended in December 2024.

== History ==
Commissioned in 1933 by Walter Luff, the controller of the network, in a bid to modernise the tramway's fleet, they were intended to replace the Dreadnought and Standard cars that had been in service since the early years of the tramway. They were built by English Electric during 1934 and 1935, the first being presented to Blackpool on 10 December 1934. Twenty-seven were delivered, of which the first thirteen were open-topped and the remaining fourteen were enclosed. They were numbered 237–263 and used on both summer and winter services. The first one, 237, was initially numbered 226, as it arrived in Blackpool along with the prototype Boat car number 225. However, with the arrival of the production Boat cars after prototype car 225, the Balloon would have been out of sequence, so it was renumbered to 237. They were originally called Luxury Dreadnought cars.

They were built with central doors and stairs, with a capacity of 84–94 passengers. Half-drop windows provided ventilation and Art Deco curved glass lights provided electric lighting. The enclosed-top trams had sliding roof windows and thermostatically-controlled radiators.

The enclosed-top cars originally worked on the Squires Gate service and it was during this time that they became better known as Balloon cars instead of Luxury Dreadnought cars because of their rounded streamlined appearance. During World War II the need for the open-top cars fell significantly and cars 237–249 had their tops enclosed to look similar to 250–263. The first to be converted into an enclosed example was 249 in August 1941; the rest were converted in reverse number order, with 237 being the last to be done in June 1942. Also during this period, the fleet was painted in a mostly dark green livery with cream stripes due to the poor quality of cream paint during this period. They also had their roof windows painted over and coverings were fitted to their headlights in order to reduce the chance of them being spotted from the air.

After the war years, the Balloons were neglected slightly in place of the new Coronation Cars, as they were considered old fashioned and too slow to load. Blackpool Corporation soon changed its mind after experiencing the temperamental nature of the Coronations and the Balloons began to make a comeback in the late 1950s. In 1958 check rail was installed through to Fleetwood, a requirement to allow the Balloons to operate to Fleetwood and the Balloons increasingly began to appear on market-day specials, as they were useful for moving the large crowds travelling north. The Balloons continued to run their normal Squires Gate service until its closure in 1961 and following this the entire class solely worked on the promenade service. In 1968 they were re-numbered to 700–726.

In 1975, Balloon tram No. 707 became the first tram to carry an all-over advert for Empire Pools. Various all-over adverts have since appeared on several Balloon tramcars.

Between 1979 and 1982, Balloon cars 725 and 714 were totally rebuilt into two new Jubilee cars, 761 and 762 respectively. The reconstruction of 725 included moving the stairs to the ends, removing the central doors to increase capacity and extending its body length. However, 762 retained the central doors to improve passenger flow at stops.

During 1980, an accident at the Pleasure Beach loop involving two Balloons crashing into each other caused 705 and 706 to be withdrawn. 705 was scrapped whilst 706 was rebuilt as an open-topper, later named Princess Alice.

In 1989, Alan Bradley, a character in the soap opera Coronation Street, was killed when he was hit by Bispham bound tram 710 outside the Strand Hotel on North Promenade.

During the 1990s and through to the 2000s, a number of Balloons that had been withdrawn from service were heavily modernised, with four of them (707, 709, 718 and 724) re-emerging with flat ends and modern interiors known as the Millennium cars, due to their appearance and modernisation occurring at the end of the 2nd millennium CE to the beginning of the 3rd millennium CE.

Balloon tram 719 was one of those that was modernised in the 1990s, where it was given a unique all-over advert for Wall's Ice Cream in 1996. This advert featured unique curvaceous seating inside and a sales counter in one of the saloons where ice cream could be bought on board. It also featured two big illuminated ice cream cone models outside on the upper deck, with one on each end and other various shapes all over the body of the tram. Illuminated upper deck side panelling and illuminated entrance doors also featured with this advert. The sales counter was removed at the end of the 1996 season. After an updated all-over advert for the same company appeared in 2001, the advert was removed at the end of the 2006 season.

From 17 October 2002, the Balloons (and all other double decker trams) were banned from going north of Thornton Gate due to the poor condition of the track. Following heavy repair work the Balloons were allowed back from Easter 2004.

With the arrival of the Flexity 2 trams to operate the main services on the tramway from 2012, nine Balloon cars were further modernised. This included fitting them with widened doors and other modifications to enable them to run alongside the new fleet (see below). Some of the Balloon cars were retained as part of the heritage fleet (see below). 716 was sold to a firm for use as an office. 722 was scrapped between 2009 and 2010 after a collision with 711 in October 2007. All of the other Balloons which were not modernised, retained in the heritage fleet, sold for purposes other than preservation or scrapped were preserved: the first to leave, number 712, re-numbered back to its original number of 249, is preserved static (but with the lower deck interior open to the public as it was when withdrawn) in pre-war green and cream livery at the National Tramway Museum at Crich. 702 is preserved at the Heaton Park Tramway in Manchester. The Heaton Park Tramway also preserved 708. However, the tram is currently on loan to The Trolleybus Museum at Sandtoft on static display. 710 was preserved by a local group named Fleetwood Heritage Leisure Trust in Fleetwood. When their plans to build a museum in Fleetwood failed to materialise and due to 710s recognition for appearing on Coronation Street, the tram was moved back to Rigby Road depot for eventual restoration as a static exhibit. 721 is preserved by the North Eastern Electrical Traction Trust at the North East Land, Sea and Air Museum in Sunderland. 726 is preserved and is currently stored at East Anglia Transport Museum.

Until 2009, only one of the cars (705) had been scrapped, however on 15 October, number 722 was moved into the body shop for scrapping and was fully scrapped by May 2010. More cars were expected to follow over the winter closure period, however, this did not occur, as all the stored trams that had been put up for sale were sold. One of those sold, number 716, was purchased by a group named Ptarmigan Transport Solutions for use as an office. However, the company went into liquidation. 716 was then put up for sale. The whereabouts and the current status of the tram is unknown, with a theory being that it was scrapped somewhere between 2015 and 2017. However, it may still remain in private ownership.

=== Jubilee cars ===
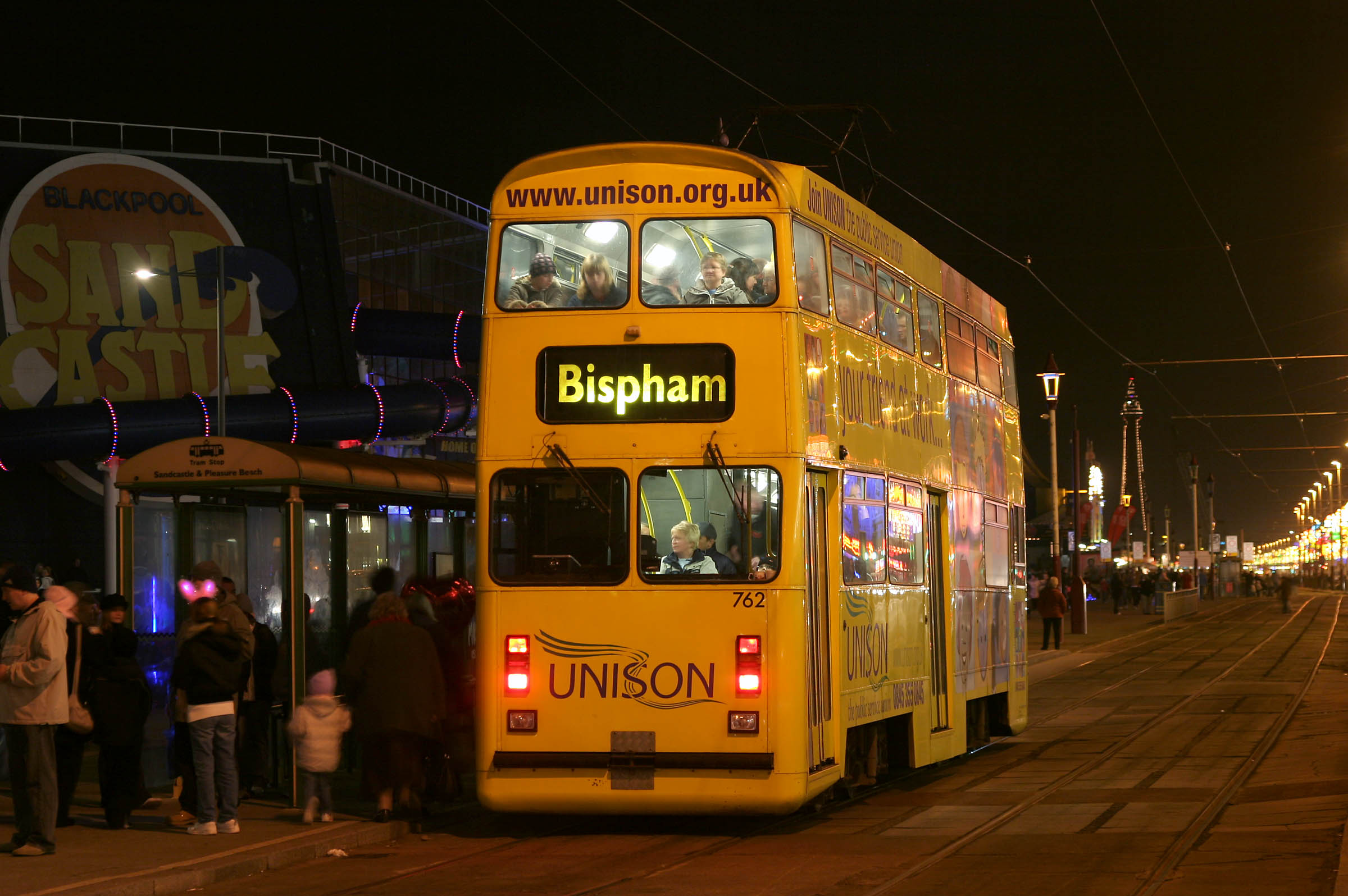
Jubilee tram 762 at the Sand Castle, Blackpool

In the late 1970s, Blackpool Corporation decided that the tramway fleet needed modernising after the closure of the inland routes during the 1960s. Attention was drawn to two Balloon cars, 714 and 725, which had been mothballed as they were in dire need of an overhaul. It was felt that these would be useful on the promenade during the summer due to their high seating capacity and reliability. Thus with funds left over from their One-Man Operated (OMO) car programme, the corporation set about rebuilding these old Balloons into "Jubilee cars", named after the Silver Jubilee of Elizabeth II in 1977.

The first to be rebuilt, 725, was stripped down to its shell and had its under-frame and body lengthened, controllers changed, doors and stairs relocated to the ends and its iconic pointed ends replaced with rectangular ones. The bogies were replaced with fabricated ones able to accommodate "Metalastik" rubber/ metal bonded suspension in the manner of the "OMO" vehicles and the tram officially entered service in 1979 after testing as Jubilee 761. Balloon 714 was later rebuilt in a similar fashion, though it retained its original central doors as well as the front ones to improve passenger flow at stops. 714 re-entered service in 1982 as Jubilee 762. Although a success and a big crowd-mover, no more were built either new or from the Balloons. Both cars were withdrawn in 2011 having become surplus to requirements due to the arrival of the Flexity 2 trams and were unsuitable for conversion to run alongside them. Therefore, they entered preservation, with 761 being acquired by the Fleetwood Heritage Leisure Trust and 762 being donated to the National Tramway Museum at Crich. In May 2017, 761 was transferred from the Fleetwood Heritage Leisure Trust to Blackpool Heritage Trust.

=== Millennium cars ===
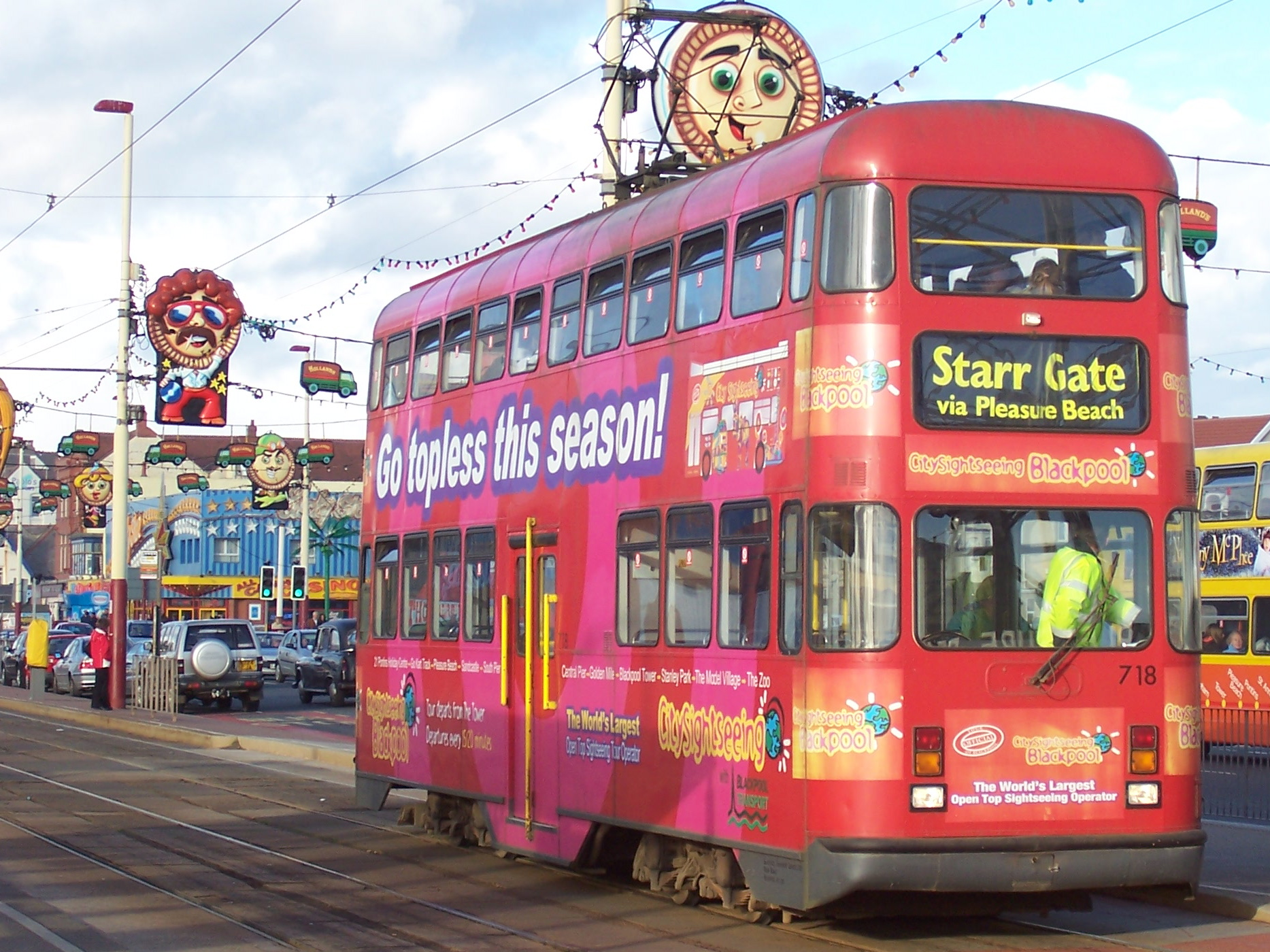
Millennium car 718, pictured before receiving RVAR compliance modifications.

These are double deck cars which were rebuilt from four Balloon cars between 1998 and 2004 to an in-house design. They have a much more rectangular shape than the Balloons which gives the trams a smooth and safer non-sharp end. They were unofficially named Millennium cars due to their appearance after rebuilding and due to the beginning of the third millennium CE. The trams retain the numbers they carried in the Balloon series, the numbers being 707, 709, 718 and 724. They have all since been further modernised with widened doors and other modifications (see below).

=== Modernised cars ===
Between 2009 and 2012, Balloon cars 700, 711, 713, 719 and 720 and all four Millennium cars, 707, 709, 718 and 724, were further modernised so that they could operate in ordinary stage carriage service after the £100 million refurbishment of the whole tramway to light rail standards. New widened doorways were fitted, with driver operated doors which fit to the new platforms which have been built at tram stops for the new Flexity 2 trams. This means that they also now have level access for disabled passengers within the centre of the cars, but retain a step leading into the lower deck saloons, giving them partial exemption for use in service through partial conversion to improve accessibility. Fixed seats and new passenger information displays were also fitted to match the new trams. Speedometers were also retrofitted to the driving consoles. 720 was the first to be modernised in 2009, followed by 700, 713 and 718 in 2010. 707, 709 and 724 were modernised in 2011, while 711 and 719 were modernised in 2012.

It was originally planned for these modernised Balloons to be used on a Pleasure Beach to Cleveleys service to supplement the Flexity 2 service, but this service has never operated due to these modernised Balloon cars not being fully DDA compliant and insufficient Flexity 2 staff being trained to work on these trams and are not used as often as previously planned for stage carriage work and are also used on the heritage service as additional trams and for heritage driver training when not required for stage carriage work. The currently serviceable examples include 700 which carries the 1940s "Wartime" green and cream livery and is named Sir Ken Dodd as well as 711 which carries the purple and white Flexity 2 livery. 719 is currently undergoing a repaint into a currently unknown livery, and is expected to return to service in the near future. The other two serviceable examples are 707 and 718 which carry the 1990s/Millennium livery, although 707 has received the wrong shades of green and cream. 709, 713, 720 and 724 have been withdrawn from service.

=== Heritage cars ===
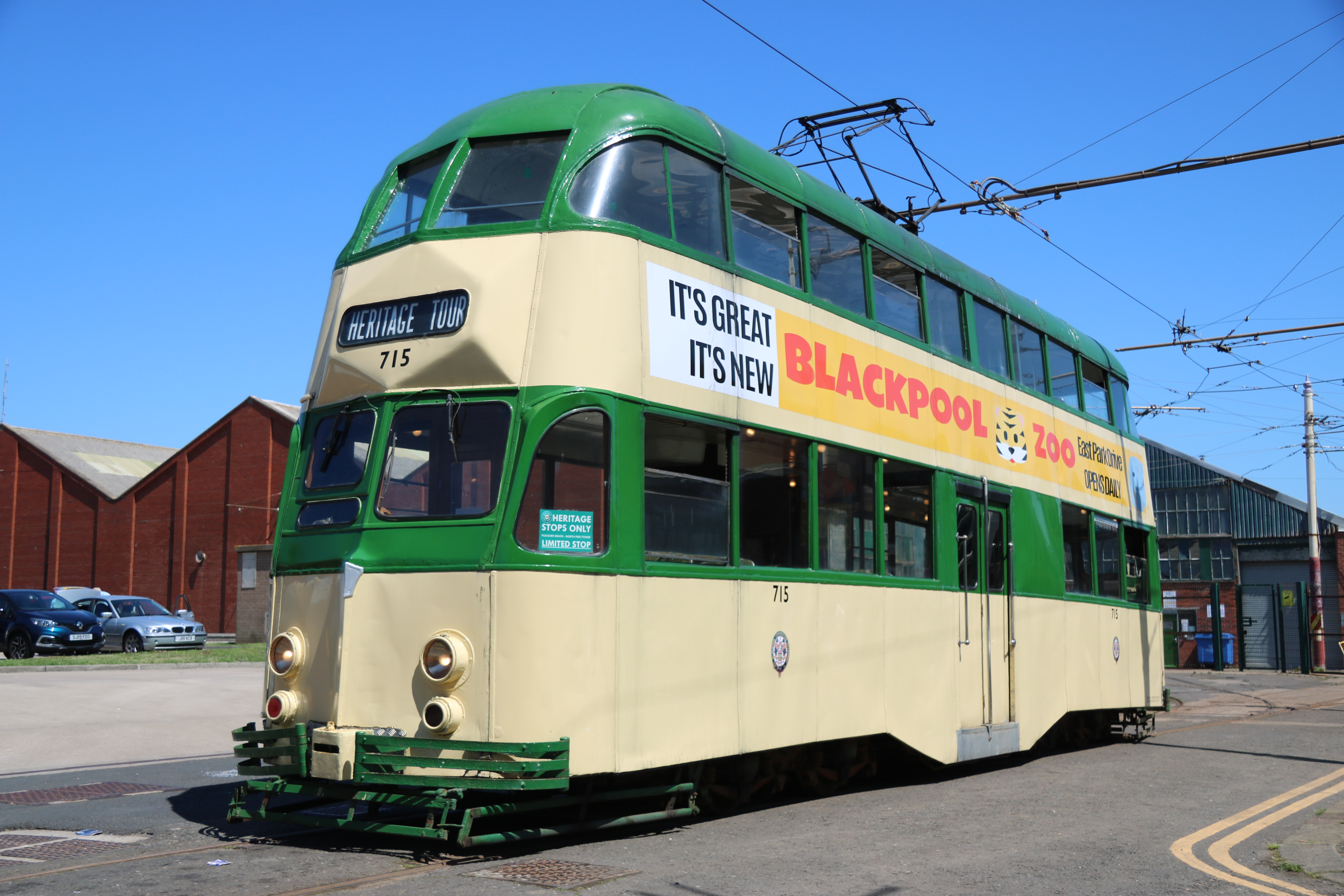
Car 715 in 2021 in 1970s cream and green livery

With the tramway's conversion to a modern light rail network in 2012 and using the Flexity 2 trams to provide the core service, a number of the Balloon trams were retained for use as heritage cars within the heritage fleet. Initially only 706 and 717 were due to be retained due to plans to dispose of Rigby Road Depot and to build an expansion of Starr Gate Depot for the heritage cars, which meant that there was only enough room for one example of each retained class of tram, 706 being open-topped and 717 being enclosed. However, Rigby Road Depot was retained whilst the expansion of Starr Gate Depot was not built, allowing the heritage collection to expand. 706 and 717 have the 1930s green and cream livery.

701 and 723 were kept as reserve cars for works purposes and for consideration for modification to join the modernised Balloon cars to supplement the Flexity 2 trams. They were transferred to the heritage fleet. 701 carries the red and white Routemaster bus livery as first applied during its major overhaul in 1991. 723 carries the 1990s green, cream and black livery. 715 was one of the trams sold in 2011 to a local group named the Lancastrian Transport Trust, but its aim to build and open a museum alongside the tramway failed to materialise. 715 was therefore given to Blackpool Heritage Trust for inclusion within the heritage fleet and returned to service in May 2015 repainted in 1990s green and cream livery and was partly repainted in 1970s green and cream livery with period adverts for Blackpool Zoo and CIS Insurance in May 2019. 704 was another tram sold in 2011 to the Lancastrian Transport Trust, but with a number of Balloon cars already retained in the heritage fleet and modernised fleet Blackpool Heritage Trust rejected adding it into their collection. However, it was preserved privately and put on loan to Blackpool Heritage Trust for an indefinite period and is currently undergoing a major overhaul to 1950s condition numbered as 241. 703 was also preserved by the Lancastrian Transport Trust, but was later sold to the Beamish Open Air Museum and was repainted in a red and cream livery as Sunderland 101. It remained in operational condition there from 2011 until it was withdrawn in 2015. Due to a change in the collection policy at the Beamish museum, it was offered to the Blackpool Heritage Trust in 2016 and after being accepted into the fleet, returned to Blackpool in 2017.

In December 2024, the entire Heritage Fleet, including the heritage Balloon cars, was suspended until further notice, with Blackpool Transport Services citing "issues such as depot space, tram movements, general safety and maintenance conflicts making it difficult to continue running the service effectively".

=== Fleet details ===
Class	Operator	Number	Year built	Cars per set	Unit nos.	Notes
Modified Balloon	Blackpool Transport	9	1934–1935; 2009-2012 (refurbished)	1	700, 707, 709, 711, 713, 718, 719, 720, 724	Refurbished to meet RVAR; supplement Flexity 2 fleet
Balloon	Blackpool Transport	7	1934–1935	1	701, 703, 704, 706, 715, 717, 723	Part of Heritage Fleet
Jubilee	Blackpool Transport	1	1935; 1979 (rebuilt)	1	761	Part of Heritage Fleet
