= Affinity Lancashire =

- Location: Fleetwood, Lancashire, England
- Coordinates: 53.9167°N 3.0151°W
- Address: Affinity Lancashire Anchorage Road Fleetwood Lancashire FY7 6AE
- Opened: 1995; 31 years ago
- Previous names: Freeport Fleetwood
- Developer: Savills UK Ltd
- Owner: Frasers Group
- Num. of stores: 40+
- Parking: 700
- Website: affinityoutlets.com/lancashire

Affinity Lancashire is a shopping and leisure outlet in the port town of Fleetwood, Lancashire, England. It is owned by Frasers Group and managed by CBRE.

Affinity Lancashire is located adjacent to Wyre Dock and marina. Retailers include - Body Shop, Cadbury, Claire's Accessories, Clarks Outlet, Mountain Warehouse, Hallmark Cards, Regatta, Home Bargains, Next, Sports Direct, Moss Bros, The Fragrance Shop and The Works among others. They currently home over 40 named brands.

The centre claims up to 60% off RRP, with new season and outlet stock available in stores.

It is home to several other hospitality retailers, including McDonald's, Costa Coffee and the Coffee Box & Bistro.

The site opened on 11 July 1995 as Freeport Fleetwood and was part of a regeneration scheme for the docks. In 2006 the outlet received a £8.6 million revamp which included the opening of new stores and dozens of new jobs.

In 2018 the centre went through a re-branding and was renamed Affinity Lancashire. This change was part of the relaunch of the previous Freeport branded outlet centres group across the UK; Affinity Lancashire, Affinity Staffordshire, Affinity Devon and Affinity Sterling Mills.

The outdoor centre is dog-friendly and is known for its seasonal, free family events.

Affinity Lancashire has parking spaces for up to 700 vehicles and ten coaches. It is served directly by the Blackpool Transport bus service 1 and is a five-minute walk from the Fisherman's Walk tram stop on the Blackpool Tramway.

The centre is fully accessible and provides free wheelchair hire.
