= List of Blackpool Tramway tram stops =

All of the current stops of Blackpool Tramway are listed here, as well as past stops.

== Main service stops ==
The following is a list of stops with platforms currently served by Blackpool's Bombardier Flexity 2 fleet, from north to south:

Stop	Image	Coordinates	Stop Type	Notes
Fleetwood Ferry	Fleetwood Ferry	53.9276°N 3.0080°W	Terminus.; Reserved track (paved).; Single platform.	The northern terminus of the tramway. The single platform is located at Bold Street, on a terminal loop of track. Provides a ferry interchange for the Wyre Estuary Ferry to Knott End. Most of the loop is on-street but the platform itself and a section at the Pharos Lighthouse are reserved. The loop is single-tracked aside from a double track alignment on Queen's Terrace.
Victoria Street	Victoria Street	53.9249°N 3.0086°W	On-street.; Side platforms.	Nearest stop to Fleetwood Market. There is a crossover north of the platforms.
London Street	London Street	53.9226°N 3.0116°W	On-street.; Side platforms.	
Fisherman's Walk	Fisherman's Walk	53.9197°N 3.0174°W	Reserved track (paved).; Side platforms.	Nearest stop to Fleetwood Freeport. The stop marks the end of the street-running section of track on Lord Street, Fleetwood. There is a crossover northeast of the platforms.
Stanley Road	Stanley Road	53.9166°N 3.0206°W	Reserved track (ballasted).; Side platforms.	Nearest stop to Highbury Stadium.
Lindel Road	Lindel Road	53.9136°N 3.0236°W	Reserved track (ballasted).; Side platforms.	
Heathfield Road	Heathfield Road	53.9099°N 3.0275°W	Reserved track (ballasted).; Side platforms.	
Broadwater	Broadwater	53.9039°N 3.0322°W	Reserved track (ballasted).; Side platforms.; Staggered platforms.	
Rossall Square	Rossall Square	53.9006°N 3.0367°W	Reserved track (ballasted).; Side platforms.	
Rossall School	Rossall School	53.8968°N 3.0395°W	Reserved track (ballasted).; Side platforms.	Located at the school's entrance.
Rossall Beach	Rossall Beach	53.8876°N 3.0404°W	Reserved track (ballasted).; Side platforms.	
Thornton Gate	Thornton Gate	53.8833°N 3.0395°W	Reserved track (ballasted).; Side platforms.	There is a middle track alignment and crossovers north of the platforms. There was previously a siding at this location.
West Drive	West Drive	53.8802°N 3.0391°W	Reserved track (ballasted).; Side platforms.	
Cleveleys	Cleveleys	53.8776°N 3.0398°W	Reserved track (paved).; Side platforms.	There is a crossover north of the platforms.
Anchorsholme Lane	Anchorsholme Lane	53.8714°N 3.0427°W	Reserved track (ballasted).; Side platforms.	The first stop in the Blackpool district.
Little Bispham	Little Bispham	53.8660°N 3.0476°W	Reserved track (Paved/ballasted).; Side platforms.	The first stop on the Promenade in Blackpool. It has a station building with toilet facilities on the northbound platform. Some trams from Starr Gate terminate here during the summer and Blackpool Illuminations. There is a track loop north of the platforms, for northbound turnbacks only.
Norbreck North	Norbreck North	53.8616°N 3.0489°W	Reserved track (ballasted).; Side platforms.	Re-opened in March 2016 after the stop was previously removed as part of the tramway upgrade.
Norbreck	Norbreck	53.8578°N 3.0501°W	Reserved track (ballasted).; Side platforms.	Located opposite the Norbreck Castle Hotel.
Sandhurst Avenue	Sandhusrt Avenue	53.8536°N 3.0518°W	Reserved track (ballasted).; Side platforms.	
Bispham	Bispham	53.8493°N 3.0535°W	Reserved track (paved/ballasted).; Side platforms.; Staggered platforms.	Located opposite Red Bank Road, Bispham's high street. It has a station building with a cafe and toilet facilities on the northbound platform. There is a middle track alignment and crossovers north of the platforms.
Cavendish Road	Cavendish Road	53.8466°N 3.0536°W	Reserved track (ballasted).; Side platforms.	
Lowther Avenue	Lowther Avenue	53.8420°N 3.0544°W	Reserved track (ballasted).; Side platforms.	
Cabin	Cabin	53.8381°N 3.0548°W	Reserved track (paved).; Side platforms.	Also known as Uncle Tom's Cabin. There is a crossover north of the platforms.
Cliffs Hotel	Cliffs Hotel	53.8360°N 3.0549°W	Reserved track (paved).; Side platforms.	
Gynn Square	Gynn Square	53.8337°N 3.0550°W	Reserved track (paved).; Side platforms.	
Wilton Parade	Wilton Parade	53.8278°N 3.0556°W	Reserved track (paved).; Side platforms.	
Pleasant Street	Pleasant Street	53.8252°N 3.0555°W	Reserved track (paved).; Side platforms.	
North Station	North Station	53.8210°N 3.0500°W	Terminus.; Reserved track (paved).; Island platform.	Terminus providing an interchange with national rail services at Blackpool North via a pedestrian underpass, situated on a reserved track segment on the former site of a homeware store. It is located near a scissors crossover, and is the first and only island platform on the network. Opened 12 June 2024.
North Pier Northbound	North Pier Northbound	53.8197°N 3.0557°W	Reserved track (paved).; Side platforms.; Staggered platforms.	This stop's platforms are significantly staggered by approximately 200m. The northbound platform is at the Grand Metropole Hotel. This due to the tram link to North Station, as a junction for this extension exists between the two platforms.
Talbot Square	Talbot Square	53.8191°N 3.0545°W	Reserved track (paved).; Single platform.	Eastbound-only stop in Talbot Square which allows passengers to alight for Blackpool Town Centre. It is situated on a reserved track segment at the beginning of the street track section on Talbot Road. It is one of 3 one-way Stops on the system. Opened 12 June 2024 as part of the North Station extension.
North Pier Southbound	North Pier Southbound	53.8177°N 3.0561°W		This stop's platforms are significantly staggered by approximately 200m. The southbound platform is nearer Blackpool Tower. There is a short siding for heritage trams and two crossovers at the southbound platform.
Tower	Tower	53.8145°N 3.0558°W	Reserved track (paved).; Side platforms.	The stop is in reality located just south of Blackpool Tower. Nearest stop to Coral Island Amusement Complex. There is a crossover north of the platforms.
Central Pier	Central Pier	53.8118°N 3.0556°W	Reserved track (paved).; Side platforms.	Nearest stop to Madame Tussauds museum.
Manchester Square	Manchester Square	53.8080°N 3.0555°W	Reserved track (paved).; Side platforms.	Located just north of a junction of on-street side track leading to Rigby Road depot, where Blackpool's heritage trams are housed and maintained. There is a siding north of the platforms.
St Chad's Road	St Chad's Road	53.8024°N 3.0556°W	Reserved track (paved).; Side platforms.	Nearest stop to Bloomfield Road
Waterloo Road	Waterloo Road	53.7989°N 3.0559°W	Reserved track (paved).; Side platforms.	Nearest stop to Blackpool South railway station.
South Pier	South Pier	53.7959°N 3.0564°W	Reserved track (paved).; Side platforms.	
Pleasure Beach	Pleasure Beach	53.7935°N 3.0567°W	Reserved track (paved).; Side platforms.	Nearest stop to Sandcastle Waterpark. There is a double-track loop south of the platforms which heritage trams use during service, for southbound turnbacks only.
Burlington Road West	Burlington Road West	53.7873°N 3.0583°W	Reserved track (paved).; Side platforms.; Staggered platforms.	Nearest stop to Blackpool Pleasure Beach railway station.
Harrow Place	Harrow Place	53.7825°N 3.0580°W	Reserved track (paved).; Side platforms.	
Starr Gate	Starr Gate	53.7779°N 3.0560°W	Terminus.; Reserved track (paved).; Side platforms.	The southern terminus of the tramway. The Starr Gate depot is located here, where the Flexity 2 fleet are housed and maintained. Nearest stop to Squires Gate railway station. There is a track loop, crossovers and headshunts here as part of the depot layout.

== Heritage tram stops ==
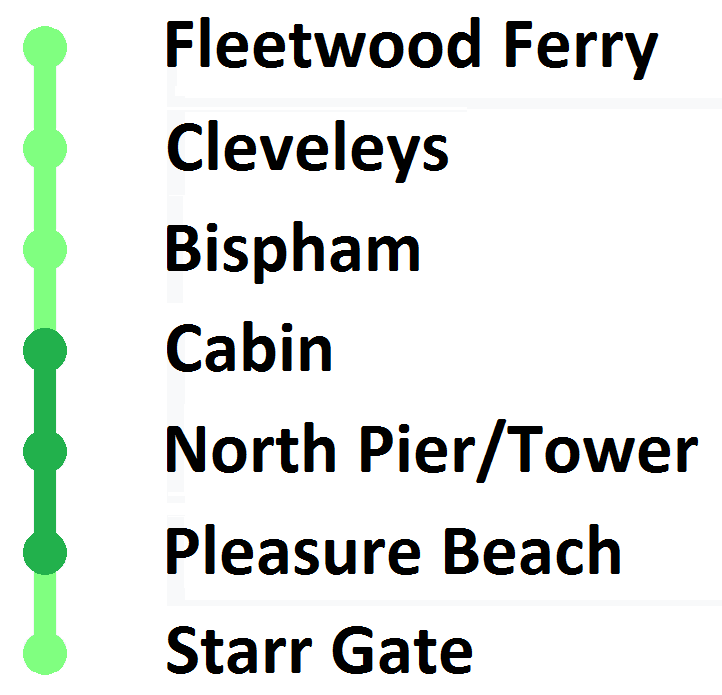
A map showing the stops used by Blackpool's heritage trams. Dark green- normal service. Light green- enhanced service.

Blackpool's heritage trams do not serve the main service platforms, instead having separate designated stops. The following is a list of stops used by them, from north to south:

- Fleetwood Ferry
  At Pharos Lighthouse.
- Cleveleys
- Bispham
- Cabin
- North Pier
  On a track siding.
- Pleasure Beach
  On a track loop.

Starr Gate is also used as a temporary stop during special events.

== Former stops ==
=== Stops removed by tramway upgrade ===
The following is a list of stops removed in 2011-2012 during the tramway modernisation, from north to south:

- Pharos Street
- Church Street
- Preston Street
- Lingfield Road
- Southfleet Avenue
- Westbourne Road
- Westmorland Avenue
- Beach Road
- Lauderdale Avenue
- Melton Place
- Norkeed Road
- Leyburn Avenue
- Madison Avenue
- Miner's Home
- St Stephen's Avenue
- Warley Road
- Imperial Hotel
- Cocker Street
- Victoria Street (Blackpool)
- Foxhall Square
- Lytham Road
  On the section of track leading to Rigby Road depot.
- Barton Avenue
- Alexandra Road
- Star Hotel
- Harrowside
- Abercorn Place

== See also ==
- Blackpool Tramway
- Public transport in the Fylde
