= Lytham St Annes Corporation Tramways =

Former tramway in Lancashire, England

Lytham St. Annes Corporation Tramways
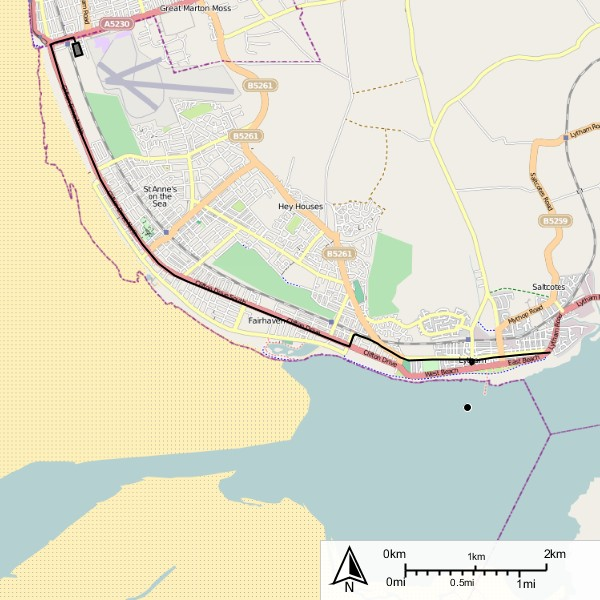
- Map of the Lytham St Annes Corporation Tramways

Operation
- Locale: Lytham St Annes
- Open: 28 May 1903
- Close: 28 April 1937
- Status: Closed

Infrastructure
- Track gauge: 1,435 mm (4 ft 8 1/2 in)
- Propulsion system: Electric

Statistics
- Route length: 10.34 miles (16.64 km)
Blackpool, St. Annes and Lytham Tramways Company era: 1903–1919
- Track gauge: 1,435 mm (4 ft 8 1/2 in) standard gauge
St Annes Council Tramways era: 1919–1922
- Track gauge: 1,435 mm (4 ft 8 1/2 in) standard gauge
Lytham St Annes Corporation Tramways era: 1922–1937
- Track gauge: 1,435 mm (4 ft 8 1/2 in) standard gauge

The Lytham St. Annes Corporation Tramways and its predecessor companies operated an electric tramway service in Lytham St Annes between 1903 and 1937.

== History ==
Blackpool, St. Anne's and Lytham Tramways Act 1896
- Act of Parliament
- Parliament of the United Kingdom
- Long title: An Act to revive the powers and extend the period for construction of the Blackpool Saint Anne's and Lytham Tramways in the County Palatine of Lancaster and for other purposes.
- Citation: 59 & 60 Vict. c. cxxix

Dates
- Royal assent: 20 July 1896

Text of statute as originally enacted

Tramway schemes in Lytham St. Annes had been proposed since 1878, but no progress was made until the Blackpool, St. Anne's and Lytham Tramways Act 1896. Under this act, a tramway was constructed from the terminus of the Blackpool tramway at South Shore Railway Station. The new line opened on 11 July 1896, operated by the British Gas Traction Company. The extension to Lytham opened in February 1897, and the fleet of compressed coal gas trams eventually reached 20. The gas powered trams were not successful, and horse cars were also obtained. The scheme was eventually unsuccessful and the company sold out.

Blackpool, St. Anne's and Lytham Tramways Act 1900
- Act of Parliament
- Parliament of the United Kingdom
- Long title: An Act to authorise the Blackpool St. Anne’s and Lytham Tramways Company Limited to construct tramways in substitution for their existing tramways in the County Palatine of Lancaster and for other purposes.
- Citation: 63 & 64 Vict. c. ccxi

Dates
- Royal assent: 6 August 1900
Other legislation
Repealed by	Lytham St. Anne's Corporation Act 1923

The Blackpool, St. Annes and Lytham Tramways Company purchased the assets of the former company for £115,000 (equivalent to £12,220,000 in 2025), and the Blackpool, St. Anne's and Lytham Tramways Act 1900 authorised an electric tramway to rebuild the route. The newly electrified tramway was opened on 28 May 1903.

On 28 October 1920 St. Annes Council purchased the assets of the company for £132,279 (equivalent to £5,111,700 in 2025). The trams were rebranded with the inscription "St Annes Council Tramways".

In 1922 the borough of Lytham St. Annes was incorporated. The trams were re-branded with "Lytham St. Annes" and later "Lytham St. Annes Corporation".

== Future ==
It is hoped that the Blackpool Tramway could be extended south to Lytham St Anne's from the current terminus at Starr Gate.

== Fleet ==
The company owned a maximum fleet of 56 cars.

- 1-30 British Electric Car Company 1903
- 31-40 Brush Electric Machines 1905
- 41-50 English Electric 1924
- 51-54 English Electric 1924 (acquired 1933 from Dearne District)
- 55 Brush Electric Machines 1923 (acquired 1933 from Accrington)
- 56 Sheffield Corporation/rebuilt Preston Corporation (acquired August 1934 from Preston - was their No.30, No.42 prior to 1932)

== Closure ==
The last tram between Lytham and St Annes ran in 1936. The remainder of the system closed on 28 April 1937.
