= Tram Power =

Tram Power is a Merseyside-based manufacturer of tramway vehicles. It built a single prototype, called the Citytram, which was tested on the Wirral Tramway and Blackpool Tramway from 2005 to 2007. The company is planning to build a tram line in Preston, Lancashire.

== City Class tram ==
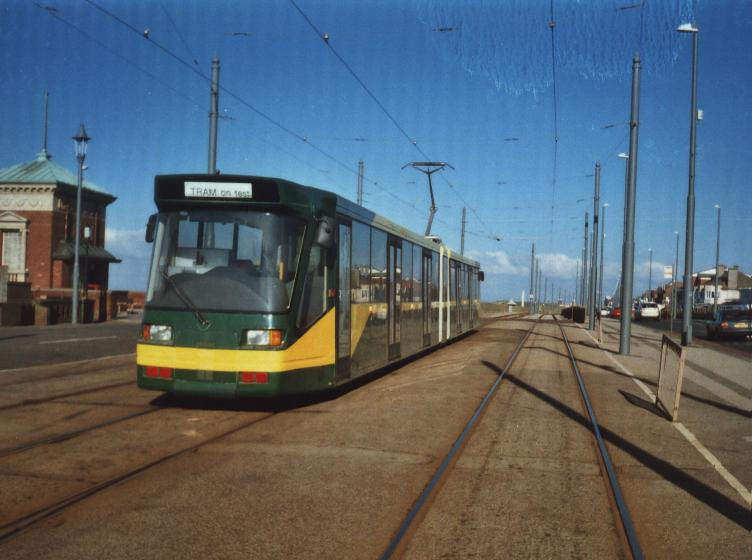
Citytram being tested in Blackpool in 2006

The City Class tram began life as a research paper in 1987, which addressed the question of LRV models increasing in weight and cost. A 4-tonne quarter-size mockup was built in 1993. A redundant 1930s tram in Blackpool had City Class running gear installed at one end and was tested from 1995 to 1997. A full-size 29-metre-long prototype LRV was built in parallel; it ran until 2000, when the TRAM GROUP, which had sponsored the project, ran out of money.

In 2005, the prototype was rebuilt with new running gear. It was tested on the Wirral Tramway for three months, then on the Blackpool Tramway. In November 2006, an agreement was reached for the prototype to run in passenger service until October 2007. Before this could occur, the prototype was heavily damaged by a fire during testing on 24 January 2007. A Railway Accident Investigation Branch (RAIB) inquiry determined that the fire likely started in the 24-volt electrical system located in a wooden box under the floor of the tram. No evidence was found that the driver or infrastructure contributed to the cause of the fire; the Blackpool Tramway was however rebuked for not having carried out a proper health and safety evaluation of the vehicle including a fire risk evaluation, and for not having in place proper safety management procedures for dealing with new technology.

In 2008, Tram Power was one of only two bidders on replacement rolling stock for the tram (streetcar) network in the Canadian city of Toronto. Tram Power's bid was ruled to be not commercially compliant. (The other bid, from Bombardier Transportation, also initially failed but a revised bid the following year eventually won the contract.)

As of 2017, the company (as Preston Tram Power) is attempting to build a tram line in Preston, Lancashire.
