= Tram Sunday =

Coordinates: 53.9201703°N 3.0243077°W

Festival of Transport - AKA - Tram Sunday

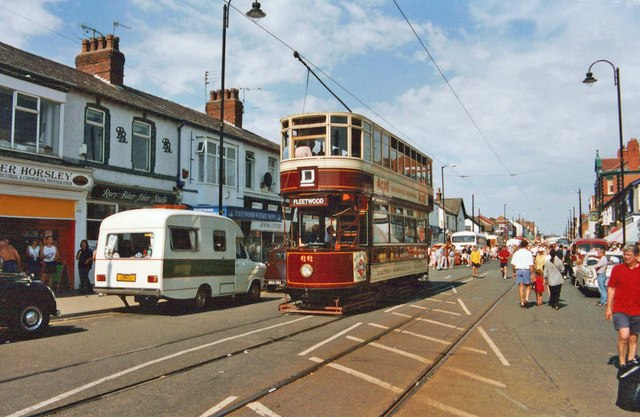
- A tram on Lord Street, Fleetwood, during the 1997 Tram Sunday
- Dates: 3rd Sunday in July
- Locations: Fleetwood, Lancashire, England
- Founded: 1985 (41 years ago)
- Website: https://www.fleetwoodarts.org

Fleetwood Festival of Transport (also known as Tram Sunday) is a festival held annually in Fleetwood, Lancashire, England. Held on the third Sunday in July, the festival was established in 1985 to celebrate the centenary of the Blackpool Tramway. The event was cancelled in 2020 and 2021 (due to the COVID-19 pandemic), and in 2023 (due to weather).

The festival showcases various forms of transport, including trams, buses and vintage cars and motorcycles.

The festival's logo includes a silhouette of Fleetwood's Pharos Lighthouse.
