= Flexity 2 (Blackpool) =

Light rail vehicle in use in the UK

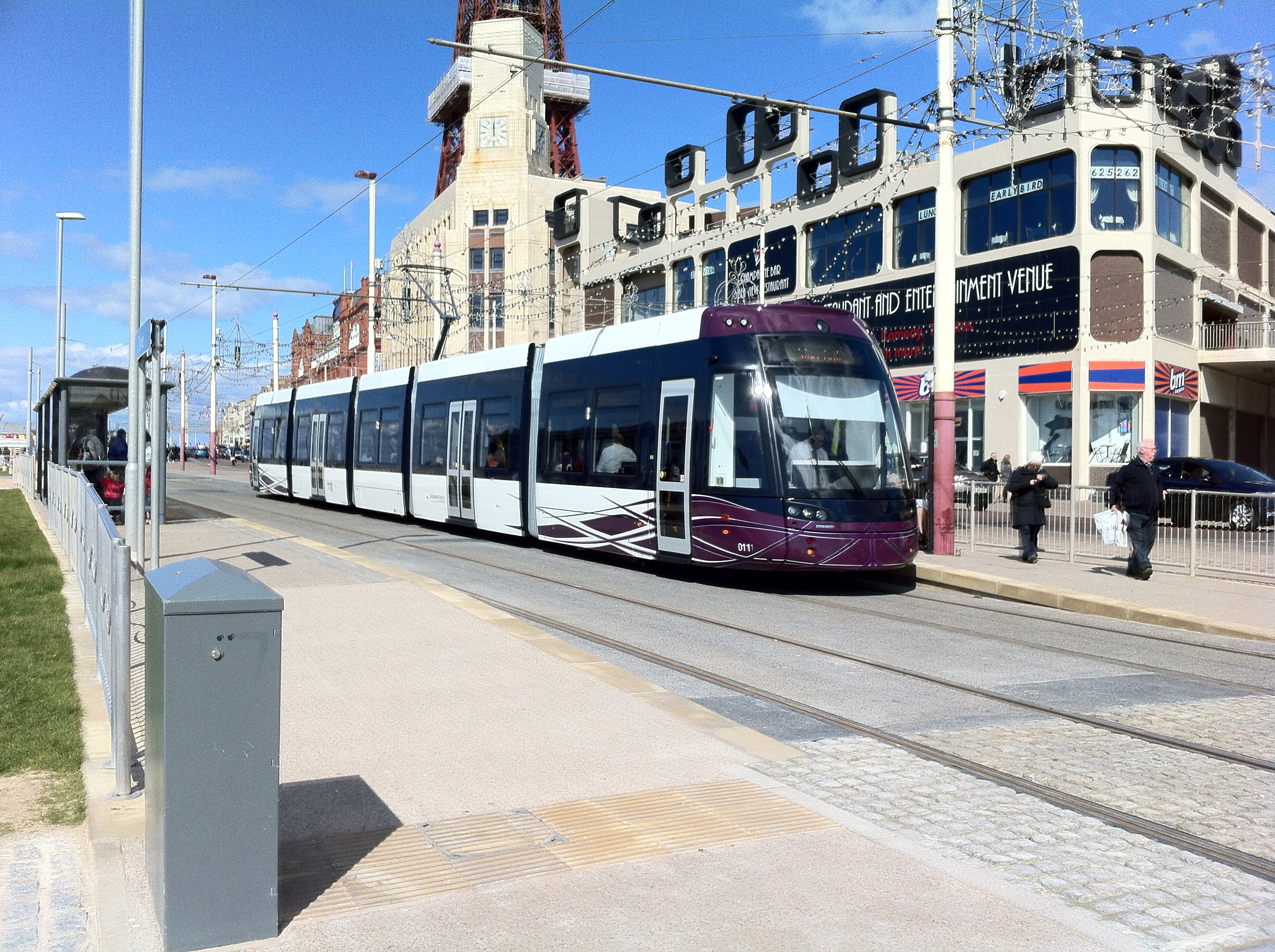
- Flexity 2 tram #011 at Tower

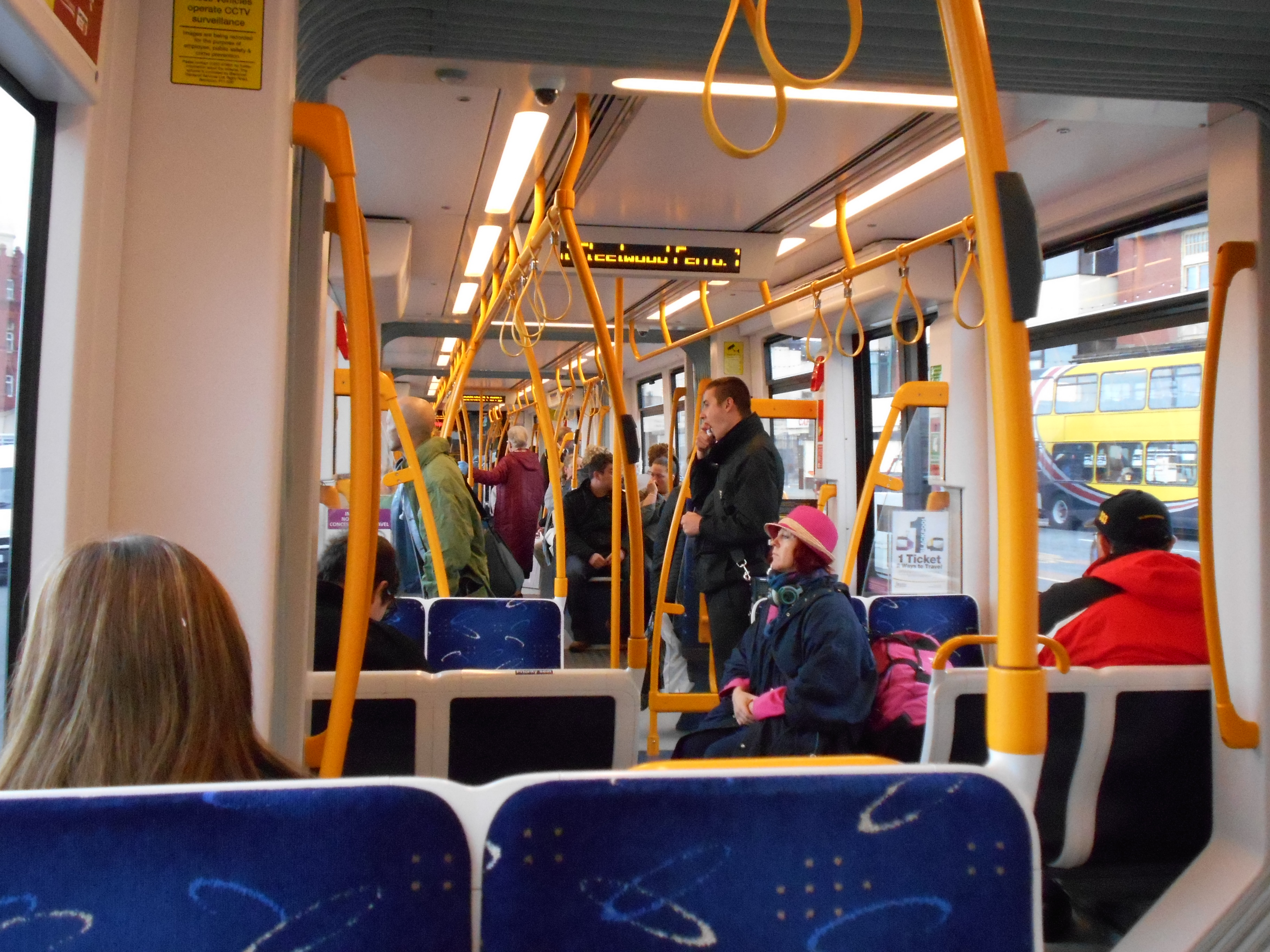
- Interior
- In service: 2012–present
- Manufacturer: Bombardier Transportation
- Built at: Bautzen, Saxony, Germany; Vienna, Austria
- Family name: Flexity 2
- Constructed: 2010–2017
- Entered service: 3 April 2012
- Number built: 18
- Number in service: 18
- Fleet numbers: 001–018
- Capacity: 148 standing, 74 seated
- Operator: Blackpool Transport
- Depot: Starr Gate
- Line served: Blackpool–Fleetwood

Specifications
- Car body construction: Steel side panels/Aluminium
- Car length: 32.23 m (105 ft 8 7/8 in)
- Width: 2.65 m (8 ft 8 3/8 in)
- Height: 3.42 m (11 ft 2 5/8 in)
- Floor height: 320 mm (12.60 in)
- Low-floor: 100%
- Doors: 8 (4 double width, 4 single width)
- Articulated sections: 5 (four articulations)
- Wheel diameter: 600–540 mm (23.62–21.26 in) (new–worn)
- Maximum speed: 70 km/h (43 mph)
- Weight: 40.9 t (40.3 long tons; 45.1 short tons) (empty); 56.7 t (55.8 long tons; 62.5 short tons) (loaded)
- Axle load: 9.6 t (9.4 long tons; 10.6 short tons)
- Steep gradient: 60‰
- Traction system: IGBT–VVVF (Bombardier MITRAC 500)
- Traction motors: 4 × 120 kW (160 hp) liquid-cooled 3-phase AC induction motor
- Power output: 480 kW (640 hp)
- Acceleration: 0.5 m/s^{2} (1.1 mph/s)
- Deceleration: 1.2 m/s^{2} (2.7 mph/s) (service); 2.73 m/s^{2} (6.1 mph/s) (emergency)
- Electric systems: 600 V DC overhead catenary
- Current collection: Pantograph
- UIC classification: Bo′+2′+Bo′
- Bogies: Bombardier FLEXX Urban 3000
- Track gauge: 4 ft 8 1/2 in (1,435 mm) standard gauge

In 2012, Blackpool Council ordered 16 Bombardier Flexity 2 trams for the Blackpool Tramway, becoming the worldwide launch customer for Bombardier Transportation's new design. The modern 100% low-floor trams replaced the Blackpool Tramway's tourist-focused and high maintenance heritage fleet, some of which have been retained with modifications for use as a supplementary fleet alongside the Flexity 2 trams and some for tourist services on the promenade. Blackpool's Flexity 2 trams are intended to be suitable for daily commuters and to provide a service competitive with other modes of transport and comply with legislation on accessibility for disabled users.

Two further Flexity 2 units (17 & 18) arrived on 1 and 15 December 2017, entering service on 4 March 2018.

== Background ==
Blackpool Council placed the £33m order for the 16 Flexity 2 trams in July 2009, with funding from the council, Department for Transport and Lancashire County Council. The worldwide launch of the Flexity 2 family took place with the unveiling of the first Blackpool tram on 8 September 2011. They entered service on 4 April 2012.

== Details ==
The Blackpool Flexity 2 trams are bi-directional five-section articulated tramcars. There are four doors on each side, two single sliding plug doors next to the driver cabs in the first and fifth cars and two double sliding plug doors in the centre of the second and fourth cars. They can accommodate wheelchairs and pushchairs, with level boarding from low platforms which were built at stops ready for the introduction of the trams.

The trams have two powered Flexx Urban 3000 bogies in the centre of the first and fifth sections and an unpowered set in the centre car where the pantograph is also located. The trams use a 600 V overhead DC power supply, can negotiate a minimum curve radius of 25 m (82 ft 0 in) in service or 20 m (65 ft 7 in) at Starr Gate Depot and can tackle a maximum gradient of 6%. Although the Flexity 2 trams family's maximum speed is 70 kilometres per hour (43 mph), the Blackpool trams are electronically limited to 50 kilometres per hour (31 mph).

The middle and end of 2023 saw the introduction of Alstom’s collision and overspeed monitoring and prevention assistance system (COMPAS) being installed on some of the trams as part of a trial which will ultimately be implemented on all trams.

== Livery ==
The final livery unveiled at the launch consists of white sides with black window surrounds and purple cabs, with a purple criss-cross pattern extending along the lower side panels. Some trams have advertisements on the sides instead of the average livery.

== Maintenance ==
The Flexity 2 cars are maintained at a depot at Starr Gate which was purpose built by VolkerFitzpatrick, with input based on experience with tram depots elsewhere in Europe.

== Fleet ==
Photo	Number	Notes
	001	
	002	Named Alderman E.E Wynne
	003	Collided with a cyclist on 8 July 2013. Had an all-over advert livery for PrettyLittleThing but has since been removed.
	004	
	005	
	006	Ran the first journey with passengers on the first day of operations on 4 April 2012 but derailed in Fleetwood on the first journey back to Starr Gate.
	007	Damaged en route to Blackpool; subsequently involved in a collision with a car on 11 June 2013, and again on 11 January 2024 with another car near Harrow Place. Named Alan Whitbread
	008	
	009	
	010	
	011	
	012	Currently wearing an advertising livery for Blackpool Pleasure Beach
	013	
	014	Involved in a collision with a Volkswagen Polo on 22 May 2012; returned to service on 26 May 2012
	015	
	016	Had all-over advert livery for PrettyLittleThing but this has been removed, now wearing an advertisement for Coral Island.
	017	
	018	

== See also ==
- Blackpool Tramway
- List of Blackpool Tramway tram stops
