= Blackpool Tramway =

Light rail transit system in Lancashire, England

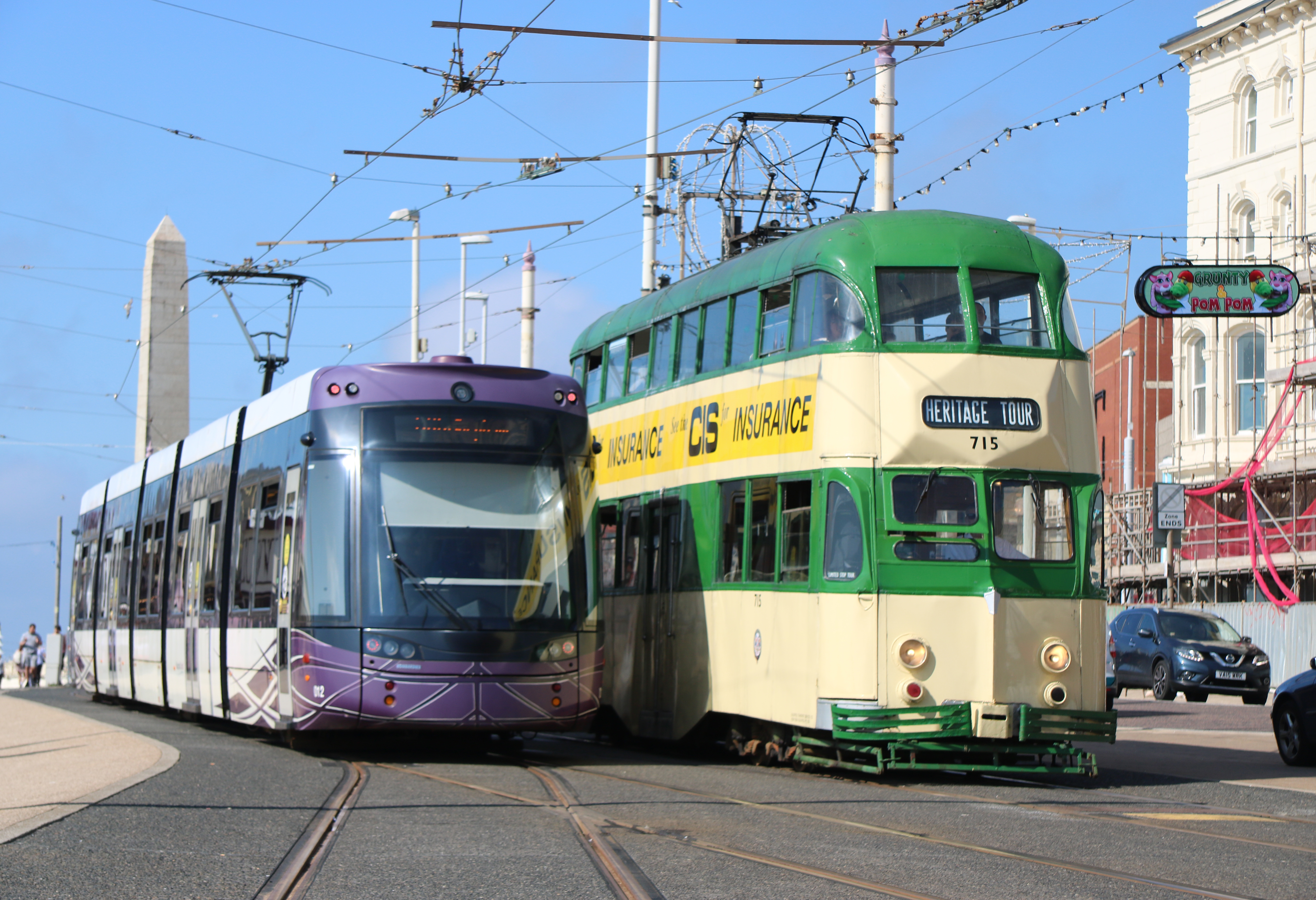
- A Bombardier Flexity 2 and a Balloon double-decker at North Pier

Operation
- Locale: Blackpool, Fleetwood, and the Fylde coast, England
- Open: 29 September 1885; 141 years ago
- Status: Open
- Lines: 3
- Routes: Starr Gate to Fleetwood Ferry; Starr Gate to North Station; Fleetwood Ferry to North Station
- Owner: Blackpool Council
- Operator: Blackpool Transport

Infrastructure
- Track gauge: 1,435 mm (4 ft 8 1/2 in) standard gauge
- Electrification: 600 V DC Overhead lines
- Stock: 18 Bombardier Flexity 2; 15 English Electric Balloon

Statistics
- Route length: 18 km (11.2 mi)
- Stops: 40
- 2023/24: 4.4 million ▼6.4%
Overview
- Website: www.blackpooltransport.com

The Blackpool Tramway runs from Blackpool to Fleetwood on The Fylde in Lancashire, England. The line dates back to 1885 and is one of the oldest electric tramways in the world. It is operated by Blackpool Transport Services (BTS) and runs for 18 km (11 miles). It carried 4.4 million passengers in 2024/25.

It is the second-oldest electric tramway in the United Kingdom, the first being Volk's Electric Railway in Brighton, which opened two years earlier and similarly runs on a reserved track along the seafront. These are also the two surviving first-generation town tramways in the UK, though the majority of services on the line have since 2012 been operated by a fleet of modern Bombardier Flexity 2 trams. Excluding museums, it is one of only a few tramways in the world to still use double-deck trams, the others including Hong Kong and Alexandria, Egypt. A 'heritage service' using the traditional trams operates year-round on weekends, certain weekdays and bank holidays, as well as during the Blackpool Illuminations.

== History ==
=== Initial launch and expansion (1885–1910s) ===
The first section opened on 29 September 1885, a conduit line from Cocker Street to Dean Street on Blackpool Promenade. It was one of the first practical electric tramways in the world, just six years after Werner von Siemens first demonstrated electric traction. The inauguration was presided over by Holroyd Smith, the inventor of the system and Alderman Harwood, the Mayor of Manchester.

It was operated by the Blackpool Electric Tramway Company until 1892, when its lease expired and Blackpool Corporation took over. A line was added in 1895 from Manchester Square along Lytham Road to South Shore, extended to South Pier with a line on Station Road connecting Lytham Road to the promenade in 1897.

Conduit operation, in which trams took electricity from a conduit below and between the tracks, though very successful in locations such as town or city centres, proved to be very problematic on a line so close to the coast. During bad weather, sea water washed over the track and into the conduit where it short circuited the traction supply and operated the circuit breakers in the power station. Sand from the beaches was blown across the tracks and filled up the conduits. It was constantly necessary to remove this sand, as the addition of sea water would leave the conduits filled with wet sand which short circuited the supply. Another problem was that electrical resistance was greater than anticipated and the voltage in portions of the conduit was far less than that generated at Blundell Street – 230 V dropped to 210 V at the junction with the main line on the Promenade, 185 V at Cocker Street and 168 V at South Pier (then Victoria Pier).

In 1899, 550 V DC overhead wiring was installed and the conduit removed. In 1900, the line was extended north to Gynn Square where it linked up with the Blackpool and Fleetwood Tramroad. In 1901, the Marton loop was opened, connecting Talbot Square and Central Station along Church Street, Devonshire Square, Whitegate Drive, Waterloo Road and Central Drive. A new depot was built on Whitegate Drive in Marton. A line was added from Talbot Square along Talbot Road to Layton in 1902. By 1903, the promenade line had reached the Pleasure Beach.

=== Expansion and contraction (1920s–1960s) ===
2009 and historical Blackpool tramway network Legend: — 2009 routes — Routes dismantled in 1960s

In 1920, Blackpool Corporation took over the tramroad, gaining 8 miles (13 km) of track and three depots, two in Fleetwood and one in Bispham. The small Bold Street Depot in Fleetwood was closed and a loop constructed at Fleetwood Ferry. Blackpool Corporation also gained all 41 trams from the tramroad.

A larger depot site was developed on Rigby Road in 1920 due to the original Blundell Street Depot having become too small. Rigby Road Depot was built in 1935. Along the line to Fleetwood, between Rossall and Broadwater a more direct line was built in 1925. The final tramway extension was in 1926, along the promenade to Clifton Drive at Starr Gate where a connection was made with Lytham St. Annes Corporation Tramways.

In the 1930s, manager Walter Luff, as part of a five-year plan for modernisation, introduced a fleet of modern streamlined tramcars including the enclosed Railcoaches, the single-deck open-topped Open Boats and the English Electric double-deck Luxury Dreadnoughts (later known as 'Balloons'). These formed the backbone of the fleet into the 21st century. In 1936, route closures began with the Central Drive and Layton routes. Lytham Road closed in 1961, Marton in 1962 and the tramroad line on Dickson Road to North Station in 1963. Marton and Copse Road Depots closed in 1963 and Bispham Depot in 1966. This left the line from Starr Gate to Fleetwood, which remains. Blackpool Borough Council transferred the operation of the tramway and buses to Blackpool Transport Services Limited in 1986.

Blackpool was the only town in the UK that retained its trams and, between 1962 and 1992, it had the only urban tramway in the UK. (The last English city to lose its conventional trams was Sheffield in 1960. The last in the UK was Glasgow in 1962. The 1992 opening of the Manchester Metrolink heralded a revival.)

=== Difficult trading (1970s–2007) ===
During the 1970s, the tramway was struggling to remain open, so one-person-operated (OMO) tramcars were developed in order to reduce costs. This included rebuilding older tramcars into OMO cars and Jubilee cars, followed by the purchase of the Centenary cars.

Another innovation during the 1970s was the application of all-over adverts on tramcars to increase earnings. Advertising on Blackpool tramcars first appeared on the Conduit cars in the early years of the tramway, with upper deck decency panels utilised for this purpose. Some trams such as the Blackpool and Fleetwood Racks and Boxes had side panels fitted to the roof for advertising purposes. Various trams have since had adverts applied on the cab-ends and sides upon their liveries. In 1965, Coronation tram No. 310 was fitted with illuminated advert panels at the cab ends on the roof. This was followed by larger rectangular boxes in the 1960s on various Coronations, English Electric Railcoaches, Brush Railcoaches and OMO trams and remained a feature on some of them until the mid-1990s. In 2010, Brush Railcoach tram No. 632 had new advertising boxes fitted to recreate this feature. All-over adverts first appeared in 1975. Balloon tram No. 707 was the first tram to carry an all-over advert for Empire Pools. Brush Railcoach tram No. 622 was the first single-deck tram to carry an all-over advert for Blackpool Zoo in 1975. The English Electric Railcoaches, Brush Railcoaches, OMO trams and Centenary trams which carried adverts had their towers panelled over to provide more space for advertising. Various all-over adverts have since appeared on several tramcars.

Following the government's pledge in 2000 to build 25 new tram networks by 2010, a £1 billion bid for a government grant was launched by Blackpool Council and Lancashire County Council in 2002 to expand the tram network to St Annes to the south and new housing estates in Fleetwood to the north, with a possible further phase to Poulton-le-Fylde and Thornton. In 2004, campaigners behind the bid expressed disappointment that nothing had been done to take the plans forward in two years. By November 2007, there was no further development.

For the first time the entire tramway was closed in November 2007 for five months of essential repair work, the second phase of an £11.8 million upgrade. In January 2007, the City Class 611 prototype "supertram" was being tested on the tramway when it caught fire as it approached Central Pier, causing extensive damage. The driver escaped when the electrical console in the cab reportedly blew up. The tram, manufactured by Merseyside based Tram Power, was being tested as part of a bid to replace the current trams. The tramcar was rebuilt at a cost of £150,000 but was not permitted to resume trials; it is currently scheduled to form part of a trial park and ride tram line in Preston. The same tram had derailed on 30 May 2006 at Starr Gate loop during previous trials. A Rail Accident Investigation Branch report stated that the derailment was due to wear and tear on the track with a contributory factor being the new type of running gear on the tram.

=== Upgrading of track and fleet (2012) ===
On 1 February 2008, it was announced that the government had agreed to the joint BTS and Blackpool Council bid for funding toward the total upgrade of the track. The government were to contribute £60.3 million of the total £85.3 million cost. Blackpool Council and Lancashire County Council would each provide about £12.5 million. The government's decision meant that the entire tramway was upgraded and 16 Bombardier Flexity 2 trams replaced the fleet in 2012.

The tramway resurfacing works and construction of a tram shed at Starr Gate meant no trams operated south of the Pleasure Beach from 2009 until the new trams entered service in April 2012 and track work at Cleveleys halted services north of Little Bispham. A replacement bus service operated.

In 2011, the line voltage was raised to 600 V DC in anticipation of the arrival of the new rolling stock. The last day of running for the traditional tram fleet was 6 November 2011. The tramway reopened on 4 April 2012 with Flexity 2 cars providing day to day services. Some of the traditional fleet has been retained and some restored, with unmodified trams being part of the 'Heritage Fleet' and modified, widened Balloon trams as part of the main fleet. The depot at Starr Gate houses the Flexity 2 fleet. Rigby Road Depot, near Manchester Square, is where the traditional trams are kept.

=== North Station extension (2024) ===
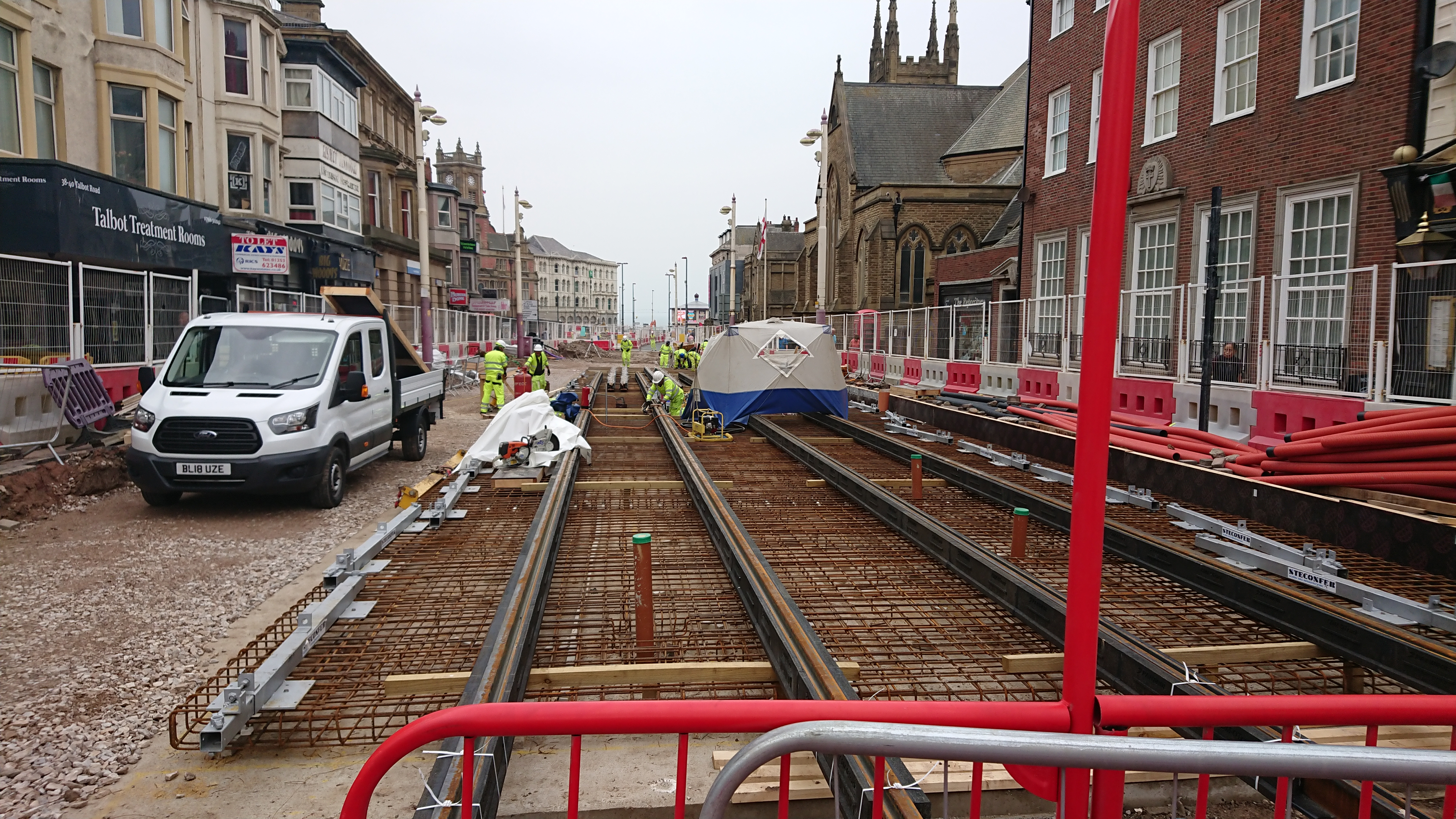
The first tram tracks are installed on Talbot Road, July 2018

An extension of the tramway along Talbot Road to Blackpool North railway station opened on 12 June 2024 following several delays. The new line connected to the Promenade line at Talbot Square, increasing the tramway's routes to three total with a new service from each of the existing termini to the station.

Enabling for the extension began on 6 November 2017, with the demolition of a homeware store in September 2020 to make way for the terminus and testing beginning on 16 March 2022. A new tram terminal was provided as part of the project, with an underpass providing access to the rail network.

=== Heritage fleet suspension (2024) ===
In December 2024, the heritage tram service and fleet was suddenly suspended until further notice, with Blackpool Transport Services citing "issues such as depot space, tram movements, general safety and maintenance conflicts making it difficult to continue running the service effectively". However, the management of Blackpool Transport confirmed that this is a temporary measure and the service is not suspended indefinitely and operations will return sometime in 2025.

== Current network ==
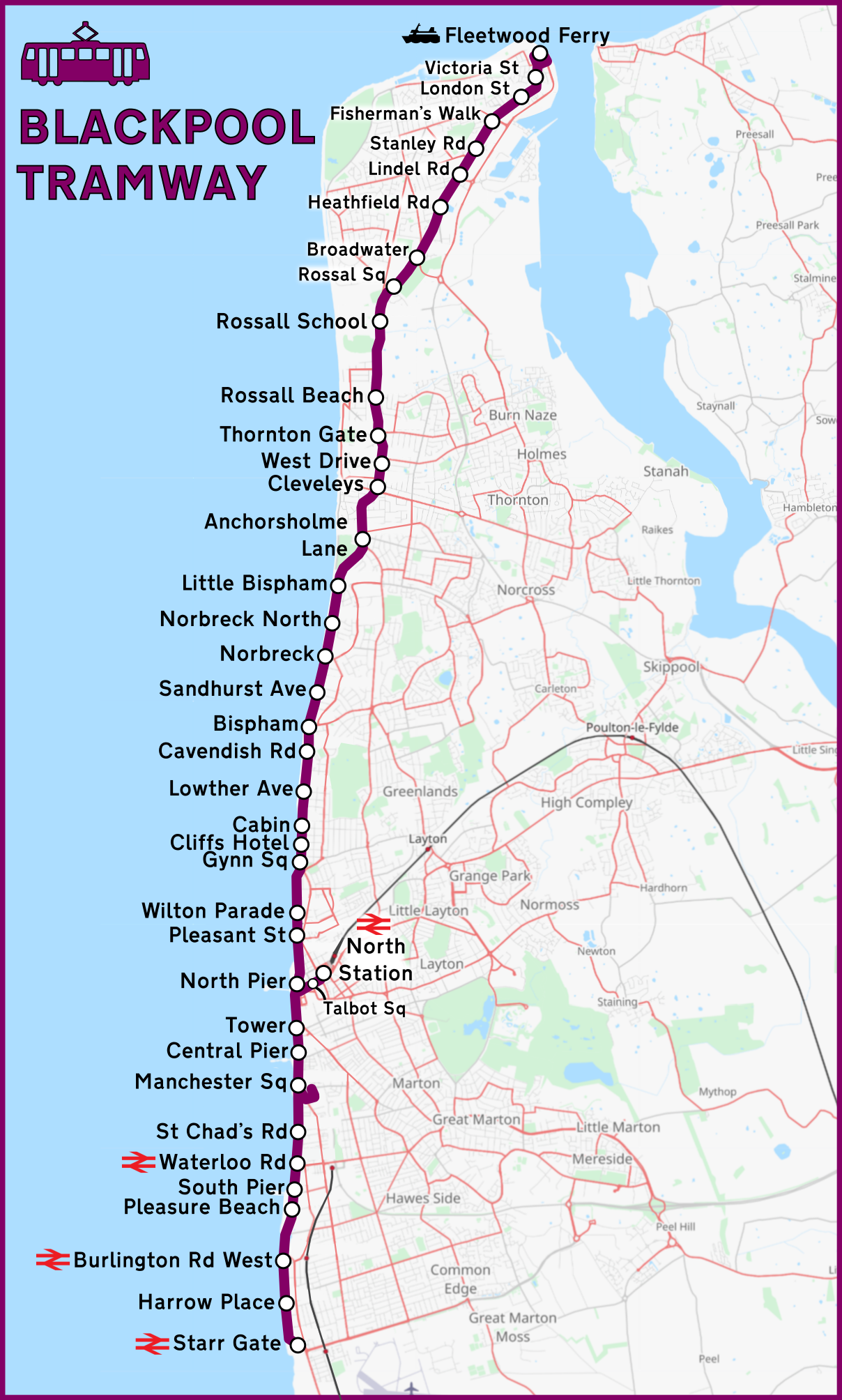

=== Routes ===
The tramway runs from Starr Gate in Blackpool in the south, to the Ferry Terminus in Fleetwood in the north, mostly along the Fylde Coast sea front, turning inland at Cleveleys for the last few miles before ending at the coast in Fleetwood. There is a spur in Blackpool Town Centre to link to a terminus at Blackpool North Railway Station. Some services, especially in busy periods such as during Blackpool Illuminations or on bank holidays, start or terminate short at Cleveleys, Little Bispham, Bispham, or the Pleasure Beach to allow a more intensive service through the centre of Blackpool. During the Illuminations, decorated trams carry passengers on the promenade along the illuminated area, running from Pleasure Beach to Bispham. The tram runs at a frequency of every 10 minutes throughout the daytime.

There are four loops: at Starr Gate (although not generally used during service), opposite the Pleasure Beach, Little Bispham and Fleetwood, as well as links to Rigby Road Depot.

The Flexity 2 trams now operate the main services, with modified English Electric Balloon double-deck trams available if necessary.

A 'heritage service' provided by unmodified, traditional trams usually runs on select weekdays, weekends, bank holidays and summer months, as well as on tours during the illuminations. The service is currently suspended, but will return sometime in 2025. They stop only at special 'heritage stops' next to normal tram stops at Pleasure Beach, North Pier, Cabin, Bispham, Cleveleys and Fleetwood Ferry. Temporary 'heritage stops' are also used for the traditional trams during select special events, such as at Starr Gate and also Fisherman’s Walk, Fleetwood for Tram Sunday.

=== Fleetwood Transport Festival ===
Each year the Fleetwood Transport Festival, known locally as Tram Sunday, is held on the third Sunday in July. It celebrated its 21st anniversary in 2005. It attracts thousands of visitors, and takes place on the full length of the main street, Lord Street. There are vintage tram rides from Fishermans Walk to Thornton Gate. In 2007, the festival, despite its popularity, was nearly cancelled due to a lack of support organising the day. A last-minute appeal for help resulted in the festival being saved.

== Rolling stock ==
=== Current fleet ===
Blackpool Tramway has the following main operational fleet (as of July 2021):

Class	Image	Type	Top speed		Length (metres)	Capacity			In service	Fleet numbers	Routes operated	Built	Years operated
Class	Image	Type	mph	km/h	Length (metres)	Std	Sdg	Total	In service	Fleet numbers	Routes operated	Built	Years operated
Bombardier Flexity 2		Tram; A fleet	43	70	32.23	74	148	222	16	001-016	All	2010–2012	2012–present
Bombardier Flexity 2		Tram; A fleet	43	70	32.23	74	148	222	2	017-018	All	2016–2017	2018–present
English Electric Balloon (modified)		Tram; B fleet	43	70	Varies				6	700, 707, 711, 718	All + Heritage	1934–1935 (refurbished 2009–2012)	1934–present
Total									24				

The fleet is divided into three parts as regards Rail Vehicle Accessibility Regulations (RVAR): the 'A' fleet, of 18 Flexity 2 trams, fully compliant with the RVAR; the 'B' fleet, (originally) nine converted double-deck trams that have partial exemption through partial conversion to improve accessibility; and the 'C' fleet, the exempt heritage fleet. The entire heritage fleet was temporarily suspended in December 2024.

The standard livery for the main fleet, introduced on the Flexity 2 trams, has purple fronts, with white sides, black window frames and a purple criss-cross pattern on the lower sides. Two of the modified Balloon trams have also been painted into the purple livery.

==== Bombardier Flexity 2 ====
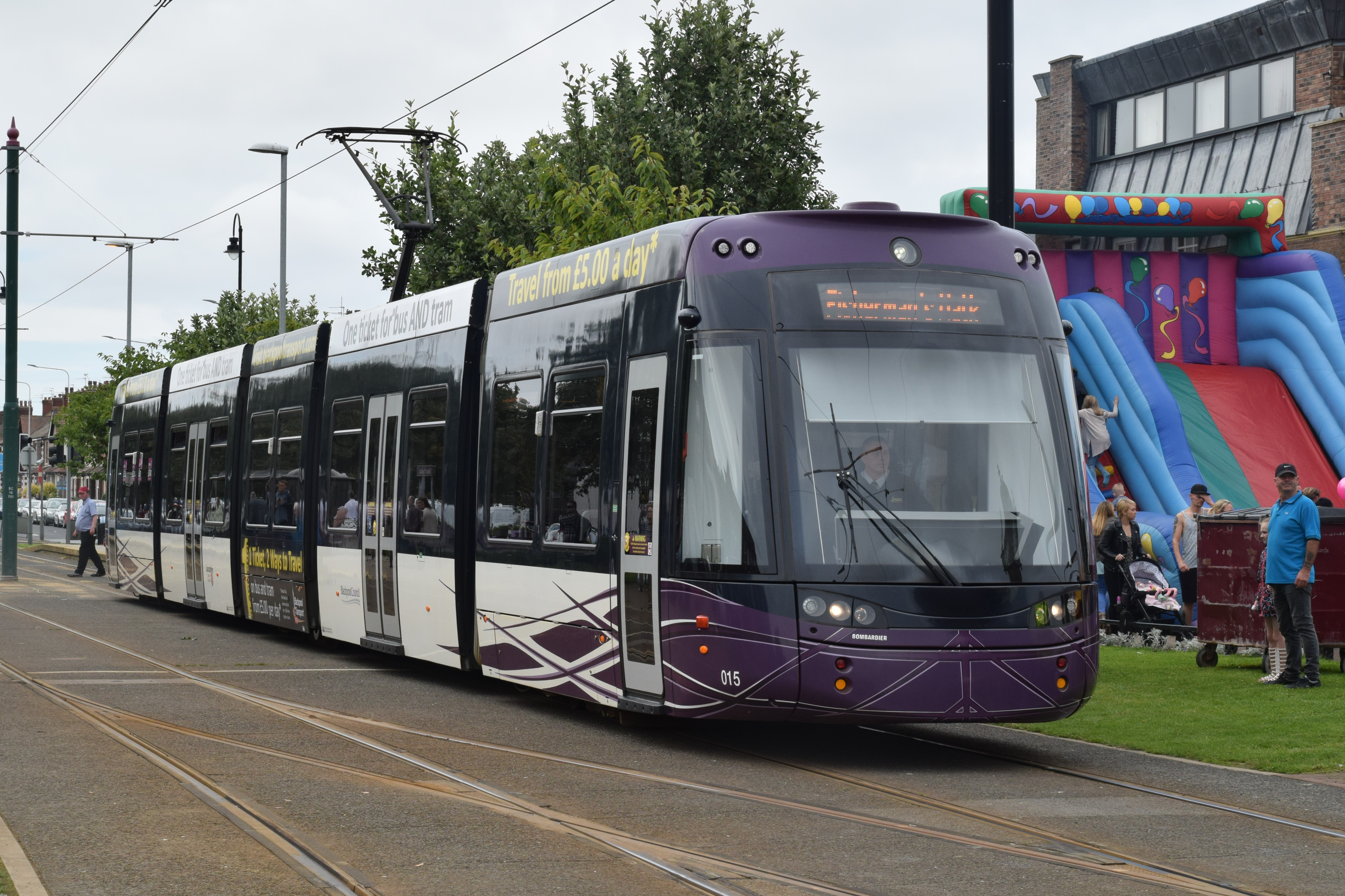
Bombardier Flexity 2 seen at Fisherman's Walk, Fleetwood

As part of the upgrade, 16 Bombardier Flexity 2 trams were ordered and were numbered 001–016. The worldwide launch of this type of tram including showing the first new tram occurred on 8 September 2011 at the new Starr Gate depot.

These trams include many improvements, such as 100% step-free access from platform to tram, dedicated wheelchair spaces, higher seating and standing capacity, faster acceleration and quieter running. They have audio-visual 'next stop' displays.

Two further Flexity 2 units, numbered 017 and 018, arrived on 1 and 15 December 2017 respectively after being ordered to assist with service demands when the extension to Blackpool North railway station opens. They entered service on 4 March 2018.

The Flexity 2 trams are all accommodated at the depot at Starr Gate.

==== Modified 'Balloon' double-deck cars ====
Nine of the Balloon cars numbered 700, 707, 709, 711, 713, 718, 719, 720 and 724, were modified between 2009 and 2012. This work included widening of the door section, such that they would be compatible with the new tram stop platforms, and be available for both stage carriage duties, and as additional trams for the heritage service. Only six such examples are now believed to be fit for operation.

=== Heritage fleet ===
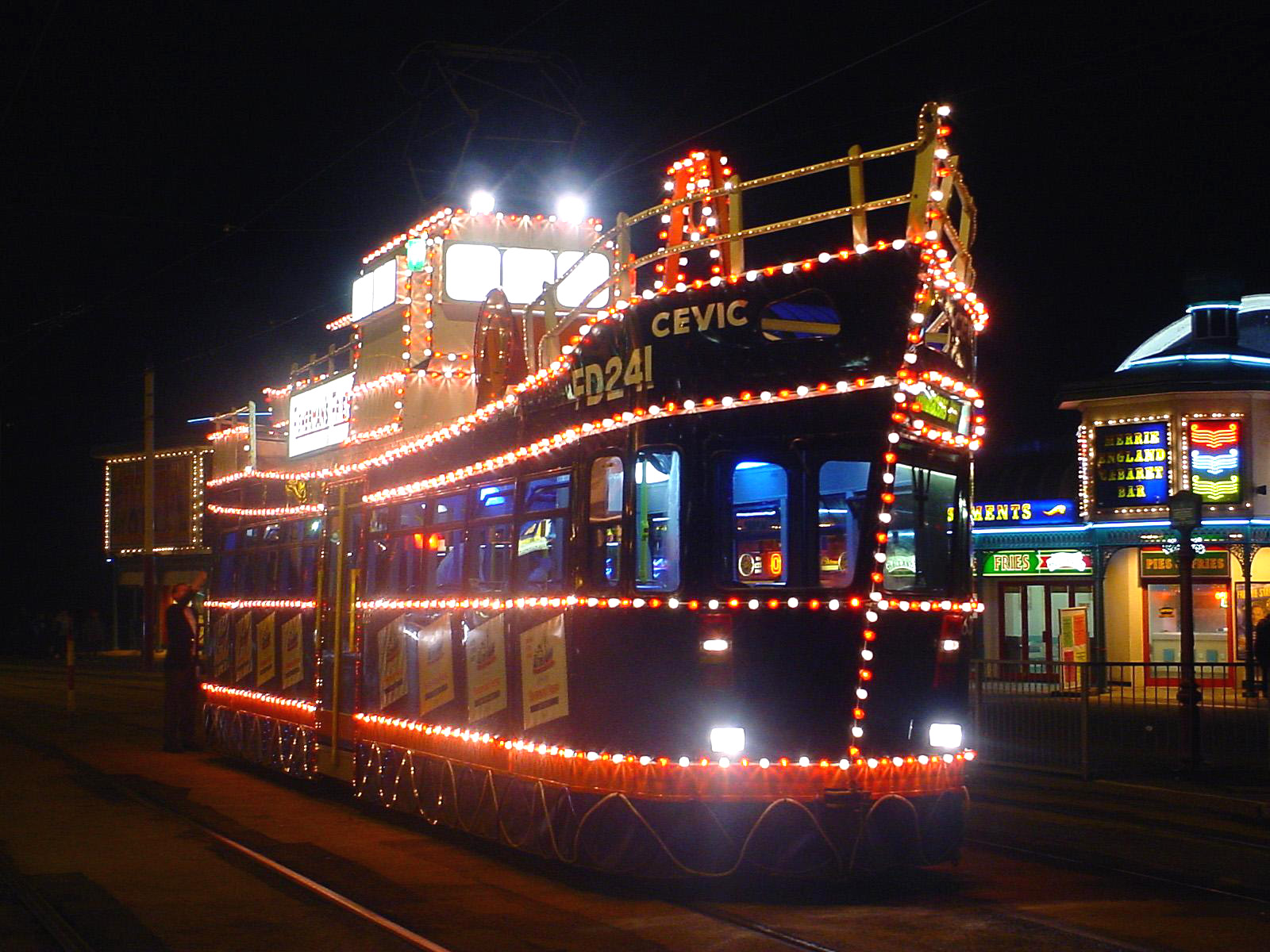
Illuminated tram No. 633, rebuilt in the shape of a fishing trawler

Blackpool has an extensive history of tramcars. A large fleet of vehicles that were retained from previous generations of the town's tramway operations, as well as some from other locations, were operated as Blackpool Heritage Tram Tours. The fleet was suspended in December 2024 with no date given for a resumption of service. However, this is expected to be sometime in 2025.

The heritage tramcars mostly use the traditional green and cream livery of BTS in various styles from the 1930s to the 1990s, with some cars using red and cream/ white liveries and other assorted liveries. Some trams carry colourful all-over advertisements.

== Infrastructure ==
=== Track ===
The route is made up of four different types of track:

- Street running, open to all traffic – along Lord Street and North Albert Street in Fleetwood and along Talbot Road in Blackpool town centre to North Station. There is also a stretch in Blackpool from Rigby Road Depot to the Promenade along Hopton Road and Lytham Road used for trams entering and leaving service only. A short stretch on the Promenade in Blackpool behind the Metropole Hotel was previously in this form, but was converted to reserved track during the 2011/12 tramway upgrade.
- Paved reserved track alongside a road, open to pedestrians but not road traffic – along most of the route between Starr Gate and Cabin.
- Reserved ballasted track, open to trams only – from Cabin to Rossall and along Radcliffe Road in Fleetwood.
- Interurban style, not following a road and open to trams only – from Rossall to Radcliffe Road, Fleetwood.

=== Power supply ===
The tramcars are powered by 600 V DC overhead line with electricity transmitted to the tramcars by pantograph and a few vintage trams by trolley pole.

=== Depots ===
There are two active depots:

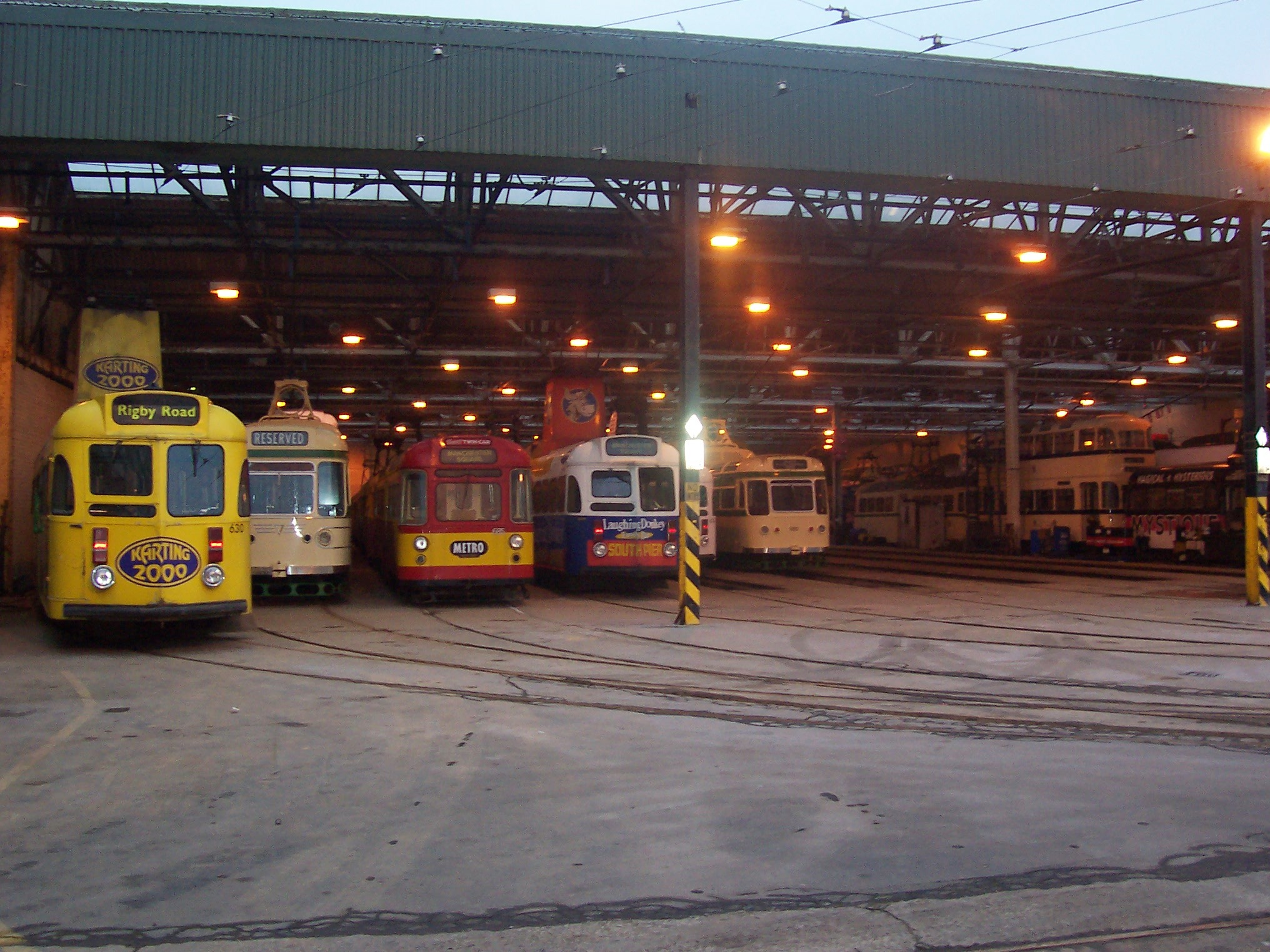
Rigby Road Depot, built in 1935

- Rigby Road Depot was built in 1935 and is still in use. It has a capacity of 108 trams. It was designed to replace the Bispham and Blundell Street depots and has been modernised several times. In 1955, tracks 15 to 18 were enclosed by a partition to be used as an electrical compound and in 1962, a tram-washing plant was built, along with the replacement of the roller-blind doors by folding aluminium doors. It has also been used to house some buses.

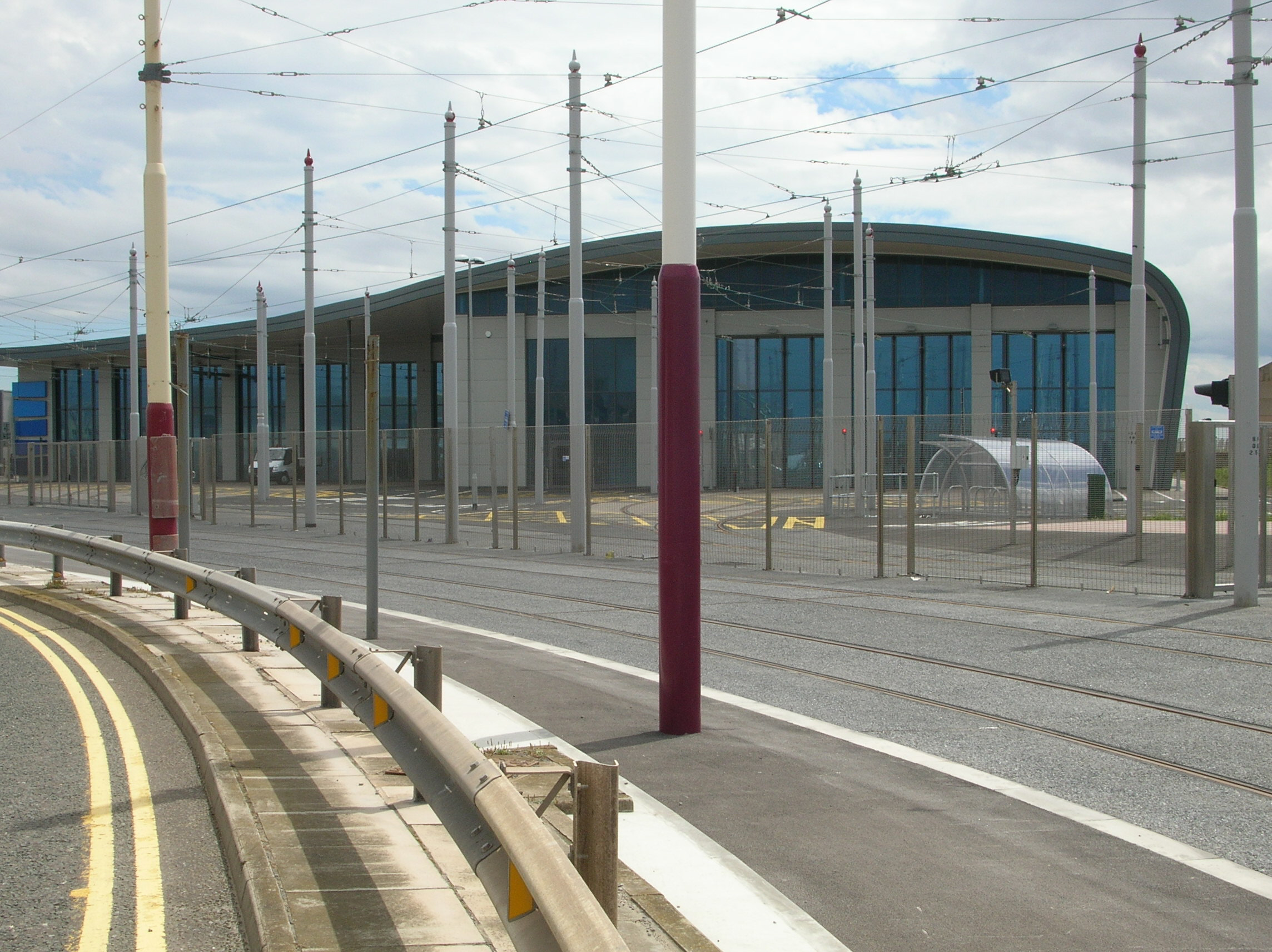
Starr Gate Depot, built in 2011

- Starr Gate Depot was built in 2011 by VolkerFitzpatrick as part of the complete network refurbishment and cost £20M. It officially opened in Easter 2012 and has a maximum capacity of 20 articulated trams. It was built to house the first 16 Flexity 2 trams, including an additional two added to the fleet in 2017. An expansion with a public attraction to display heritage units was planned when Rigby Road Depot was due to be disposed of, but was not built, with Rigby Road Depot being retained for the heritage trams.

==== Previous depots ====
There were five further depots that are now closed, mainly demolished:

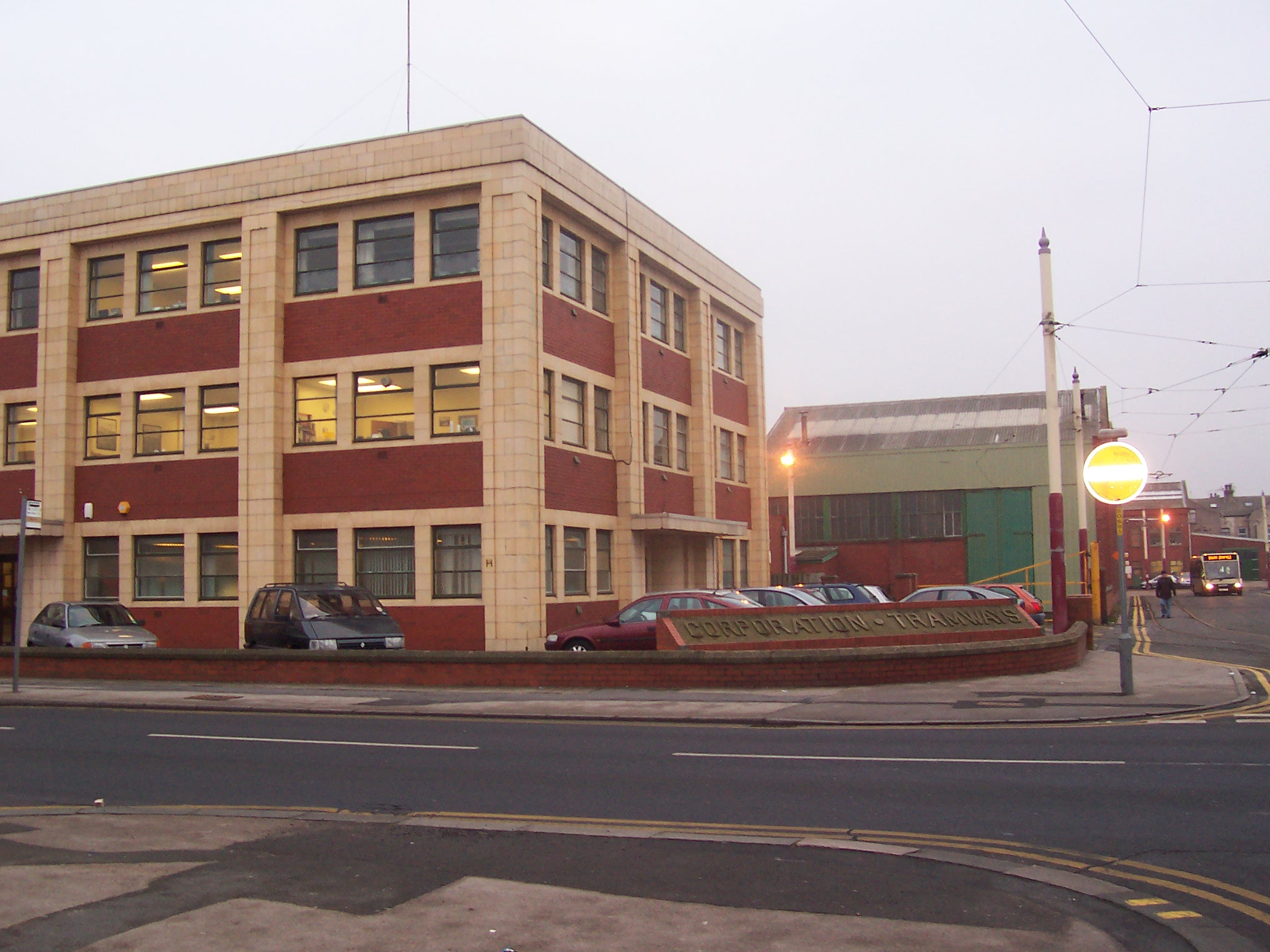
Corporation Tramways building, Blackpool

- Bispham Depot was built in 1898 and extended in 1914 by Blackpool & Fleetwood Tramroad Company, to house 36 trams on six tracks. A substation was built to the side of the depot. The depot was used to receive pantograph cars in 1928 and Brush Railcoach cars in 1940. It closed on 27 October 1963 and was used as a store until the mid-1970s. It was demolished to make way for a Sainsbury's supermarket and the depot's headstone was installed at Crich's National Tramway Museum.
- Bold Street Depot opened in January 1899 and had a capacity of four cars on two tracks. It was used only by the last two trams to Fleetwood in the evening and the first two trams in the morning. After Blackpool Corporation took over the tramroad in 1920, the depot was closed. Wires were taken down in 1924 when the Fleetwood loop was built. After World War II the depot was used by Fisherman's Friend. It was demolished in 1973 to make way for flats.
- Blundell Street Depot opened in 1885 to house ten conduit trams. It was extended in 1894 and 1896 and in 1898 when the roof was raised to accommodate overhead wiring. After extension, the depot housed 45 trams on five tracks. The depot became a store in 1935 when the new central depot opened at Rigby Road. The inspection pits were filled in after World War II and after 1956 the building was used as a bus garage. The depot was reopened for trams in March 1963 after the closure of Marton depot. A new entrance was built in July 1964 but capacity was restricted by the presence of an ambulance station in the building. Following damage to the central roof caused by a gale, the depot was demolished on 4 November 1982.
- Copse Road Depot was built in 1897 by the Blackpool & Fleetwood Tramroad Company with six tracks, capable of housing 18 trams. It was originally used as a store and service depot. After passing to Blackpool Corporation Tramways it was used to dismantle old trams. Between 1925 and 1949 a line connected the depot with the railway and was used to shunt wagons. After Blackpool Corporation sold the depot, it was used as a car showroom. The substation still fed the Fleetwood line section during this time. The depot was demolished in 2016 after a scheme to convert the building into a tram museum failed, due to the poor condition of the building.
- Marton Depot was built in 1901 to accommodate 50 trams. It was used for central routes but declined in use after the closure in 1936 of the Layton and Central Drive sections. It closed for tram use between 1939 and 1944 due to World War II and accommodated aircraft of the Vickers Aircraft Company. It closed on 11 March 1963, with the last car to leave being Standard car No. 48. The front half was demolished with the rear half in commercial use. A petrol station is now on the site.

== Fares and ticketing ==
Tickets are purchased from the conductor on board, with daily, three-day, seven-day and monthly 'saver' tickets also available, which can be used on trams (excluding heritage trams) and Blackpool Transport buses. Heritage tram tickets are available for a round trip tour between Pleasure Beach and Cabin. Group day tickets are also available for up to 5 passengers including Adults, Children and Dogs. In addition to heritage tours, heritage day tickets can also be used on all Blackpool Transport trams and buses as well as autumn illumination tours.

National Rail tickets to Blackpool stations with a Plusbus add-on includes unlimited tram travel between Thornton Gate and Starr Gate.

== Corporate affairs ==
=== Ownership and structure ===
The Tramway is operated by Blackpool Transport Services Limited (BTS), which was set up in accordance with the provisions of the Transport Act 1985, and operates passenger transport service in the Fylde coast area through its bus and tram operations. BTS is wholly owned by Blackpool Council, which leases the tramway and associated premises to BTS.

=== Business trends ===
Full financial and operational figures are not published for Blackpool Tramways. Blackpool Council, and its operating subsidiary Blackpool Transport Services Limited, both produce annual accounts, but figures for the tram operations are not shown separately. The key available trends in recent years for Blackpool Tramway are (years ending 31 March):

	2010	2011	2012	2013	2014	2015	2016	2017	2018	2019	2020	2021	2022	2023
Passenger revenue (Note: As defined in the DfT Light Rail and Tram Survey (Table LRT0301a)) (£M)	3.0	2.5	1.7	5.0	6.1	5.6	6.1	6.5	6.7	7.0	6.7	1.9	5.3	6.8
Number of passengers (Note: Passenger journeys, as defined in the DfT Light Rail and Tram Survey (Table LRT0101)) (M)	2.2	1.6	1.1	3.7	4.3	4.1	4.9	5.1	5.2	5.2	4.8	1.1	4.2	4.9
Number of trams operational (Note: 'A' and 'B' fleets only; excludes variable heritage fleet) (at year end)	Heritage fleet only		5	21	21	21	21	21	23	23	24	24	N/A	N/A
Notes/sources														

Activities in the financial year 2020/21 were severely reduced by the impact of the coronavirus pandemic; the shortfall in fare income was funded by a grant from the UK central government's Department for Transport.

== Future developments ==
There have been several proposals for further extensions of the tramway, most notably along the South Fylde Line (to Lytham St Annes) and the Fleetwood Branch Line (to Poulton-le-Fylde). Blackpool Council, Fylde Council and Wyre Council have each applied for £800,000 in order to pursue a feasibility study which would investigate a "Tram Loop" proposal encompassing the two branch lines.

== Popular culture ==
In a 1989 episode of the television soap opera Coronation Street, character Alan Bradley was killed when he was hit by a Bispham-bound tram outside the Strand Hotel on North Promenade.

== Accidents and incidents ==
- On 22 July 1980, Balloon trams 705 and 706 collided head-on on the turning loop at the Pleasure Beach. 705 was bound for Starr Gate whilst 706 was stationary on the loop. 705 was on the wrong line due to the points being incorrectly set and ran into 706, about to depart for Fleetwood. Both trams were severely damaged and 6 people were injured, including driver Darrell Pierre, then the only full-time black employee at Blackpool Transport. 705 was scrapped, the only Balloon to meet this fate until 2009 when 722 was scrapped due to collision damage. 706 was rebuilt as an open-topped Balloon. A County Court judgement in 1982 found that Blackpool Corporation were 80% to blame for the collision, contrary to initial reports implicating Pierre; however, Pierre did not get his name cleared until November 2010, 15 months after his death.
- On 13 March 2004, Centenary tram 644 derailed and collided with a wall on the promenade near Gynn Square. One of the poles from the Illuminations had been deliberately placed in the groove of the left-hand rail of the northbound line. 644 narrowly missed a pedestrian walking along the promenade and went through the wall, knocking debris onto the walkway below. The tram was balancing on the wall, but did not fall off.
- On 24 January 2007, Citytram prototype 611, while undergoing a trial run, caught fire near Foxhall, causing severe damage to one end of the cab. No-one was injured, but it did not return to Blackpool when repaired.
- On 5 August 2009, a pedestrian, Maureen Foxwell age 70, was killed by a speeding driver at a designated crossing. The driver, who was travelling at over three times the speed limit near tram stops of 4 mph (6.4 km/h), was sentenced to 15 months in prison.
- On 4 April 2012, on the very first day of Flexity 2 operation, tram 006 working the very first journey with passengers derailed at Fleetwood Ferry due to a buildup of sand in the groove of both tracks.
- On 24 September 2016, BTS heritage tram 272 caught fire due to failure of the rubber insulation on one of its cables; all of its passengers and staff were unhurt, except for a conductor who injured his hand breaking a glass panel to access a fire extinguisher.
- On 24 November 2021 a pedestrian was in a collision with a tram in Fleetwood Road just south of the Anchorsholme Lane stop, later dying from his injuries. The Rail Accident Investigation Branch report a year later found that insufficient lighting meant the tram driver did not see the pedestrian, and that it was unclear why the pedestrian was not apparently aware of the tram's presence.

== Gallery ==
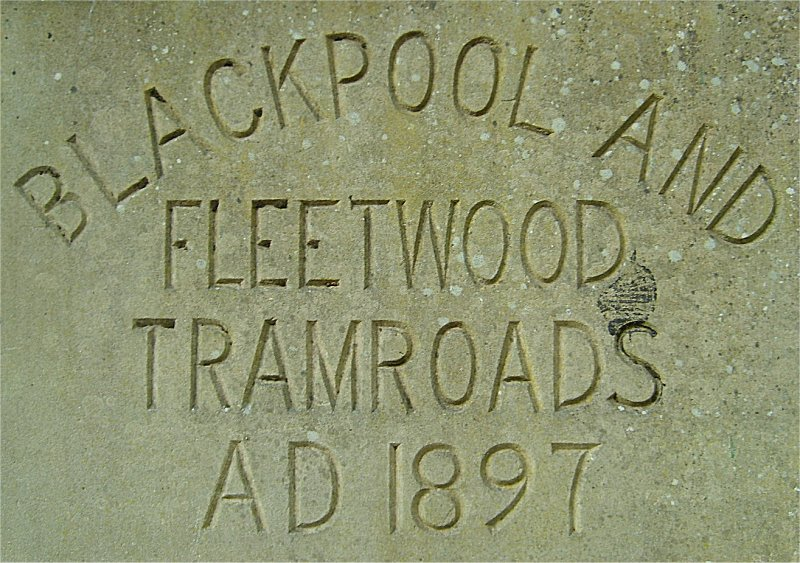
Headstone from Bispham depot now at Crich

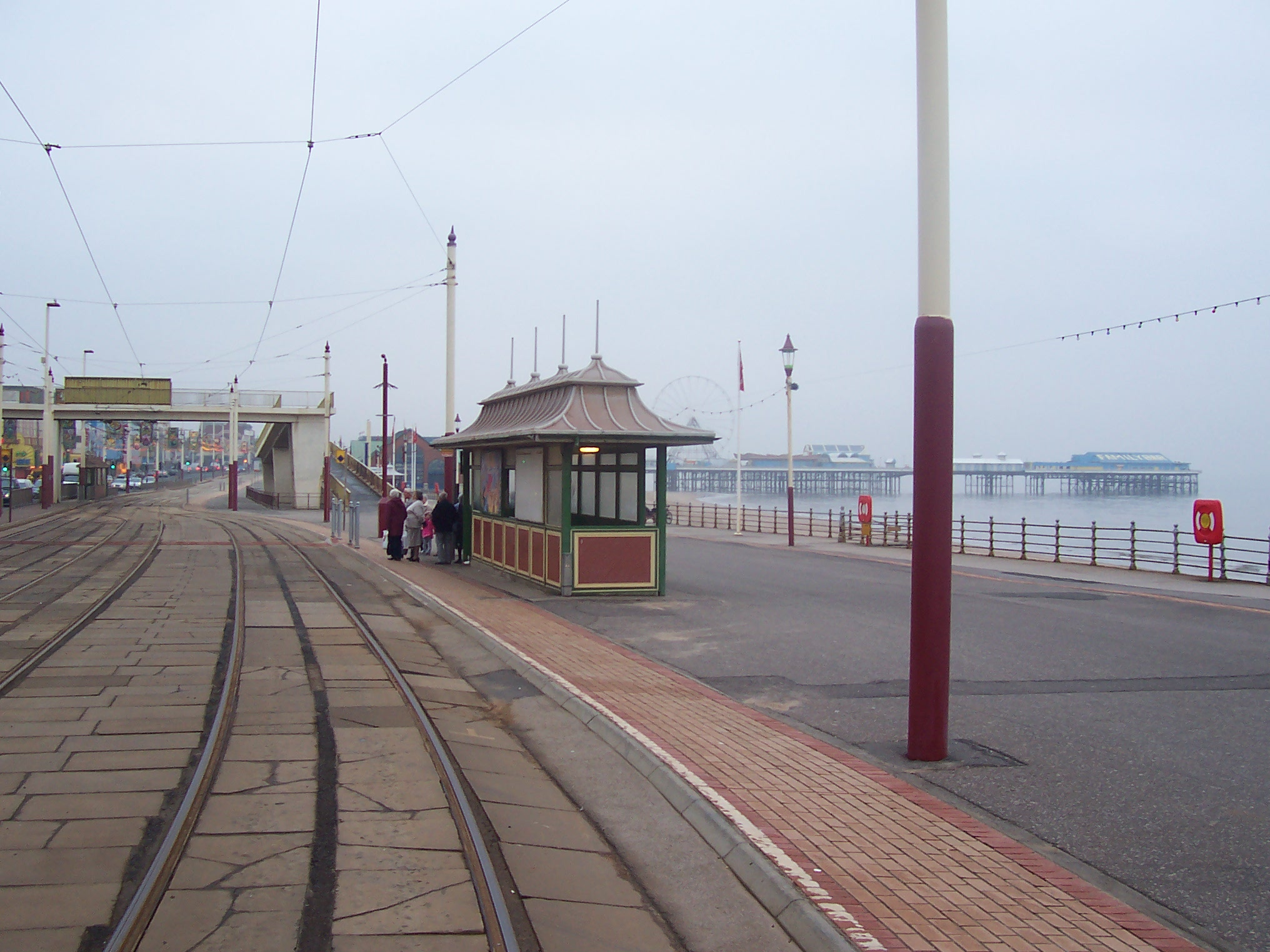
A pre-upgrade tram-stop located on the Promenade

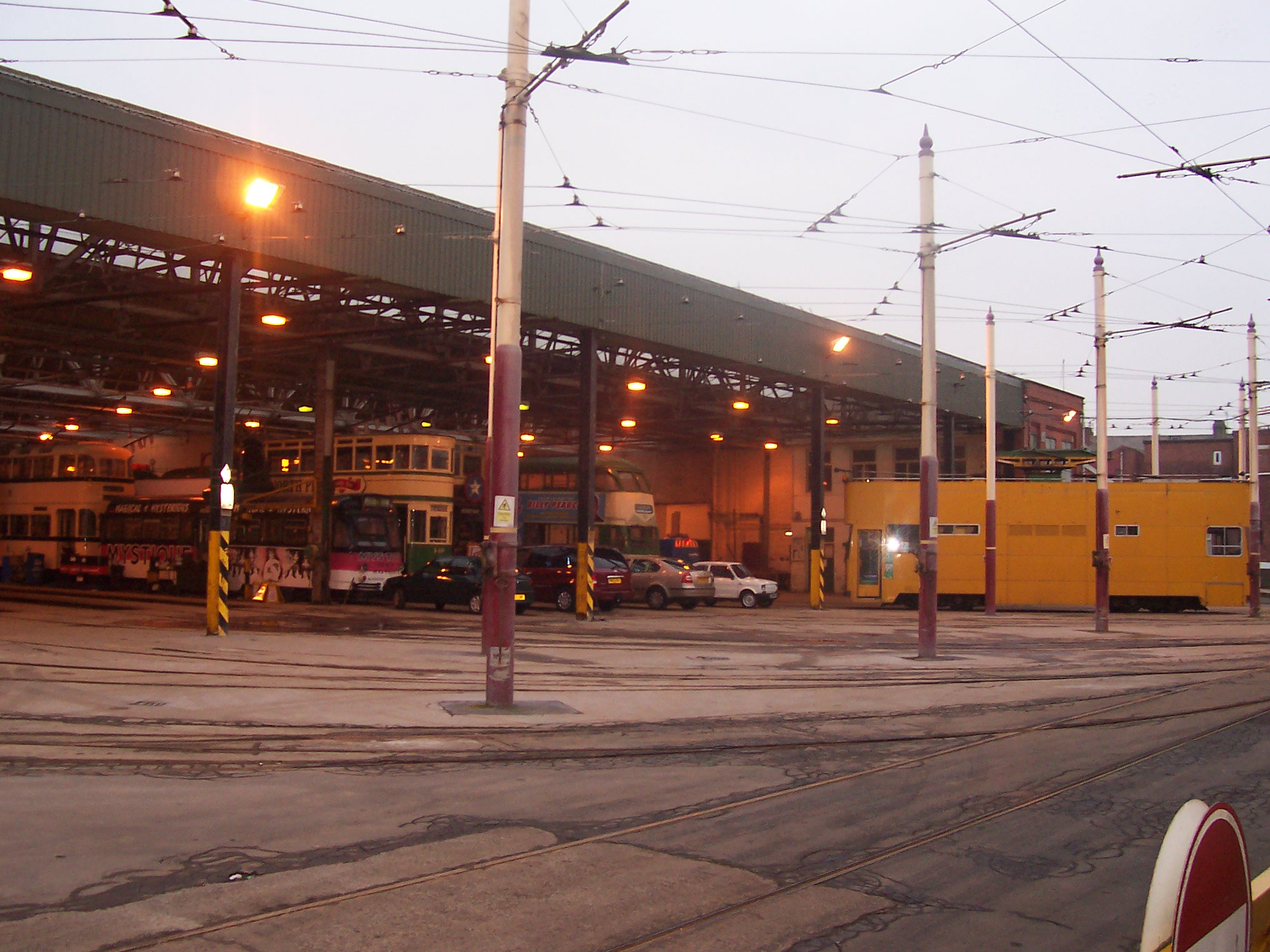
Rigby Road Depot (engineering part)

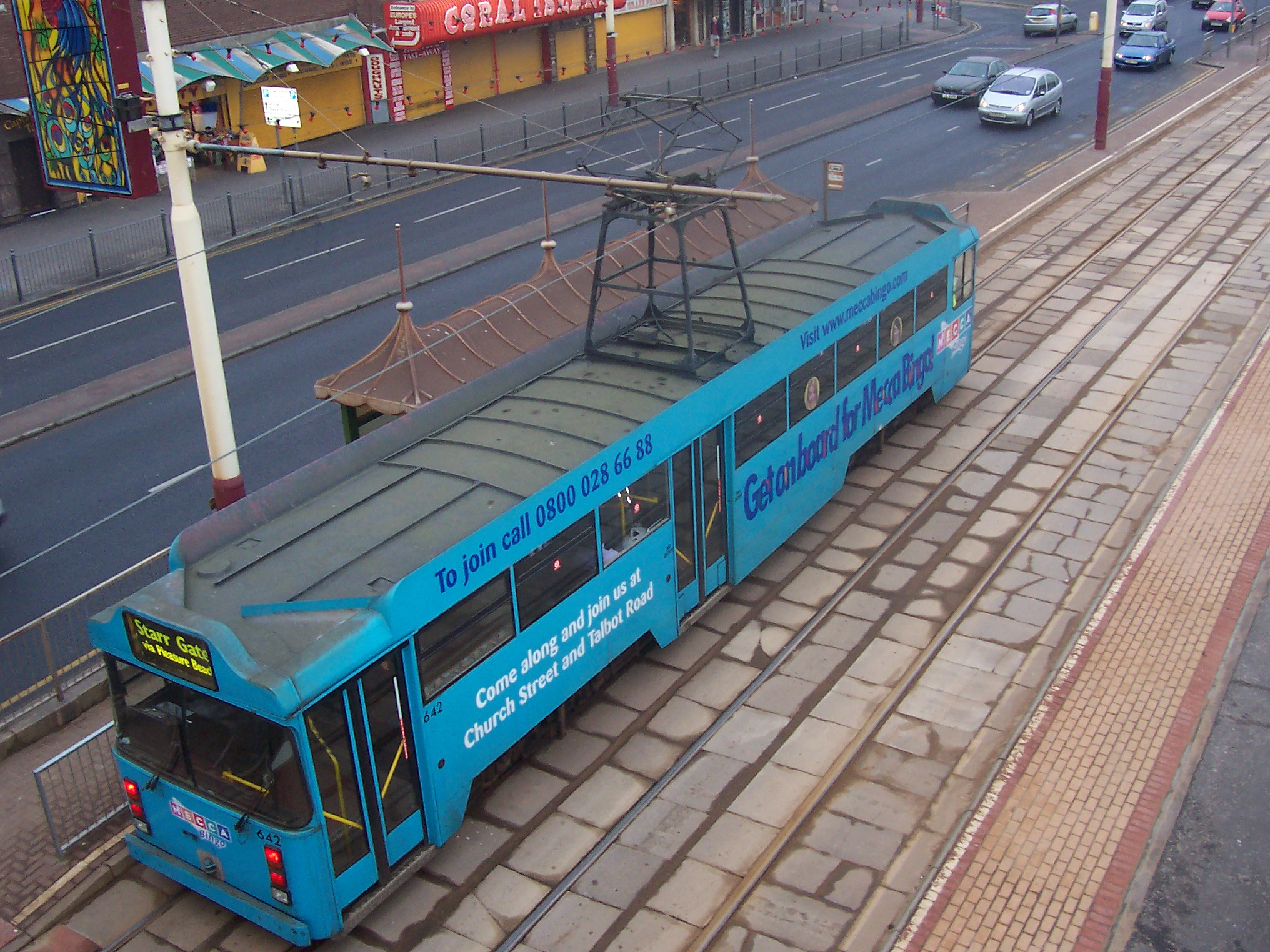
Centenary class tram (Promenade)

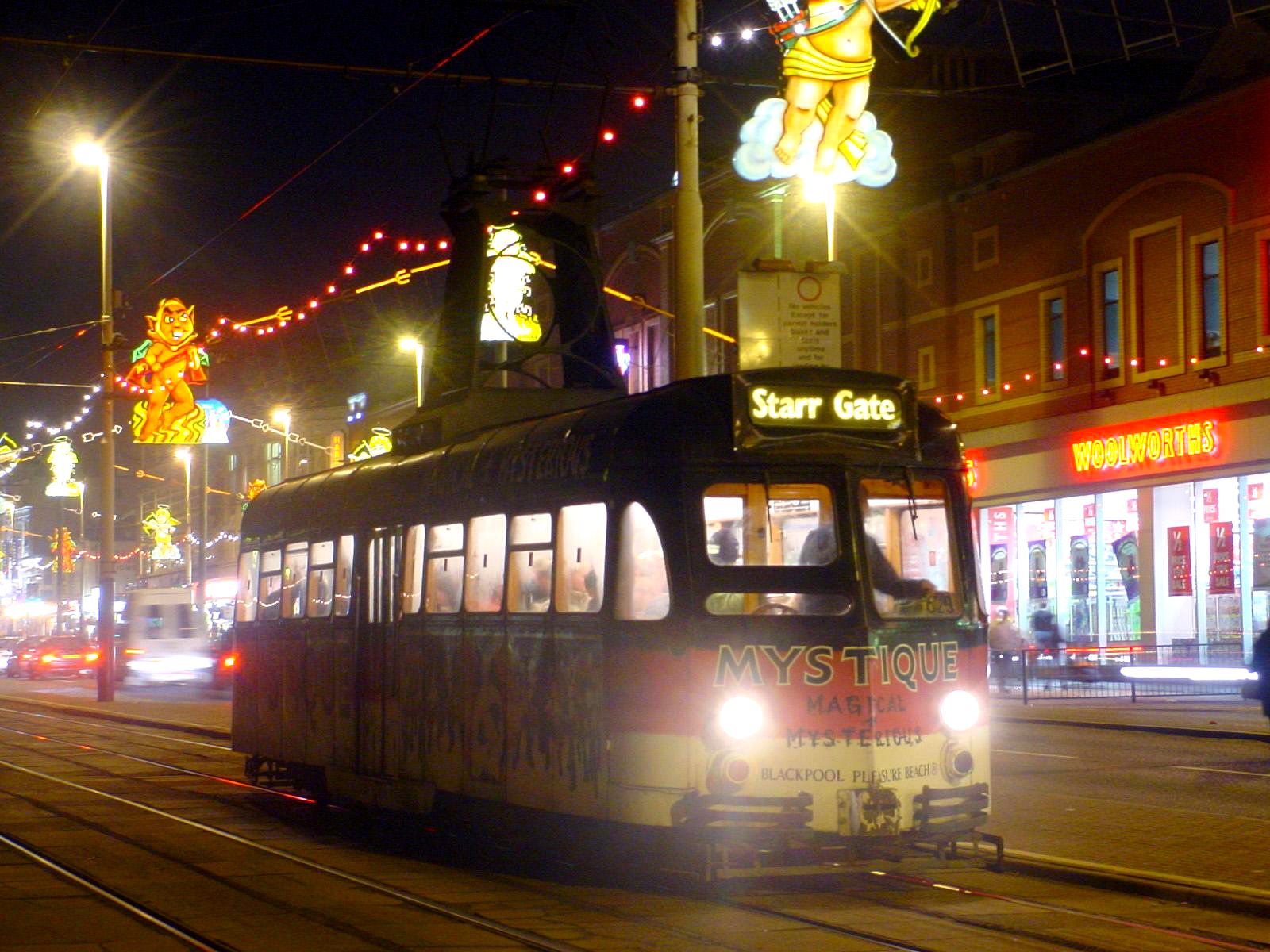
Brush Railcoach No. 623 in Mystique show advert livery

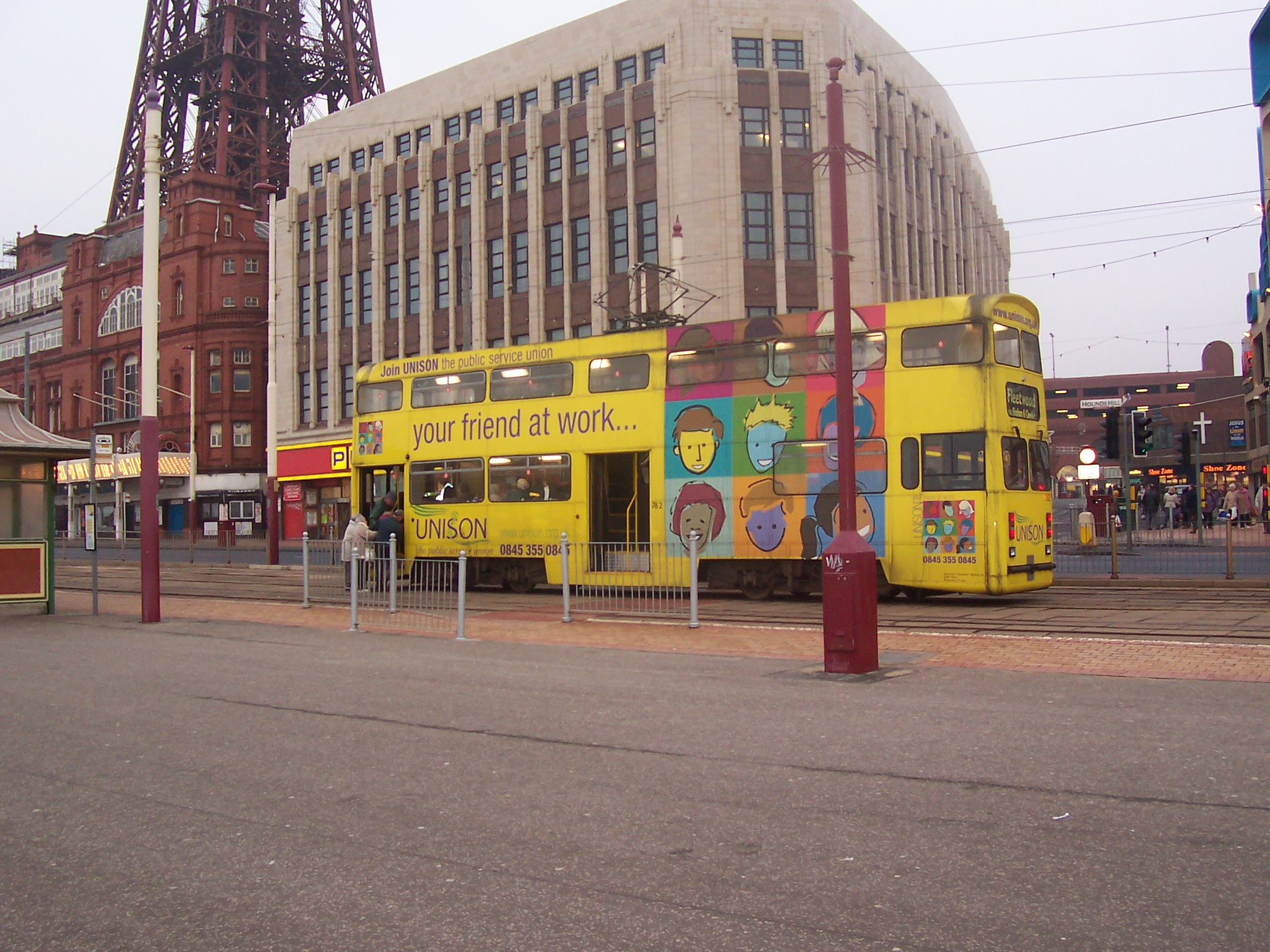
Double-decker Jubilee class tram (Promenade)

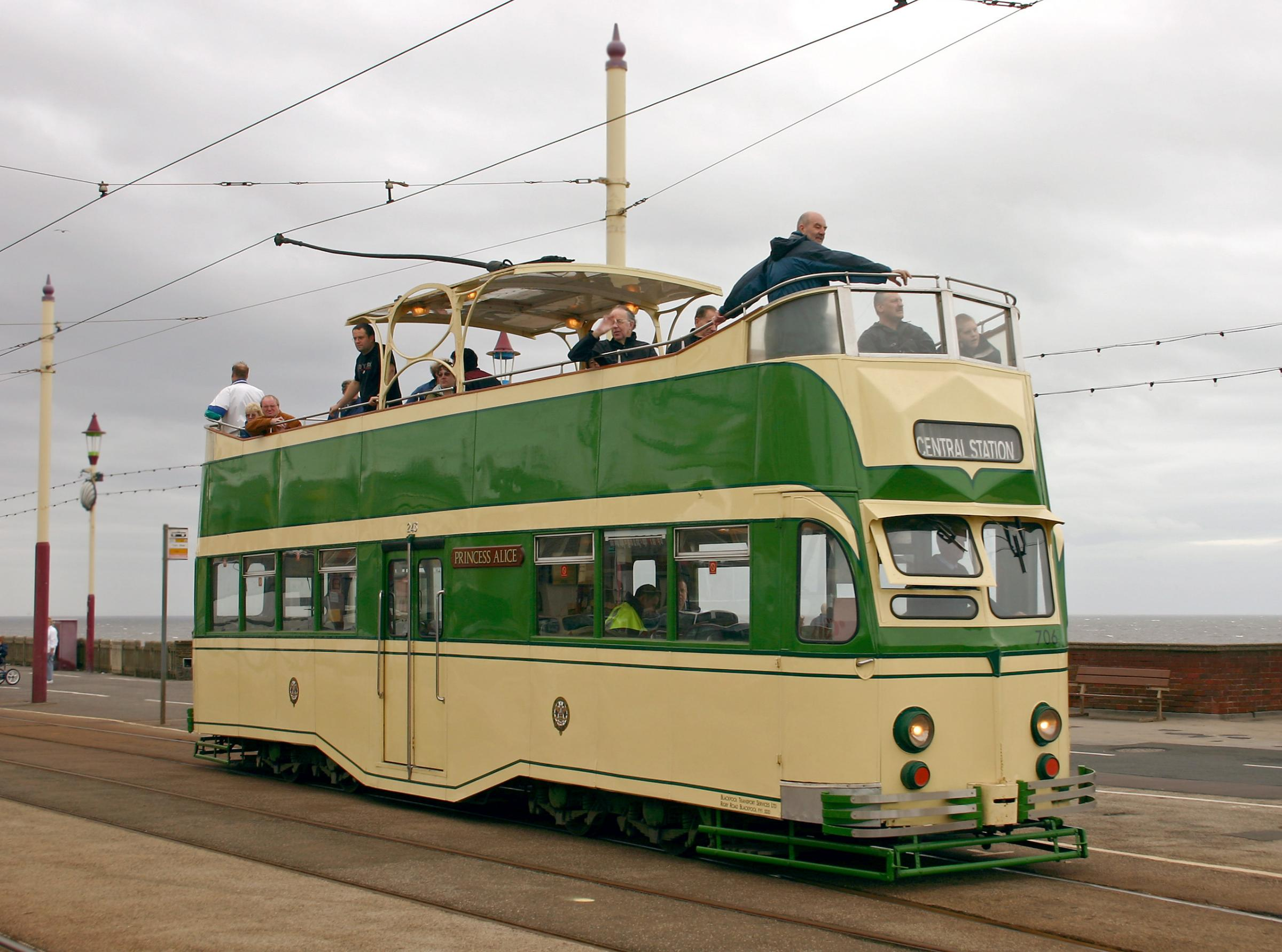
Open-topped Balloon tram No. 706 Princess Alice at Bispham

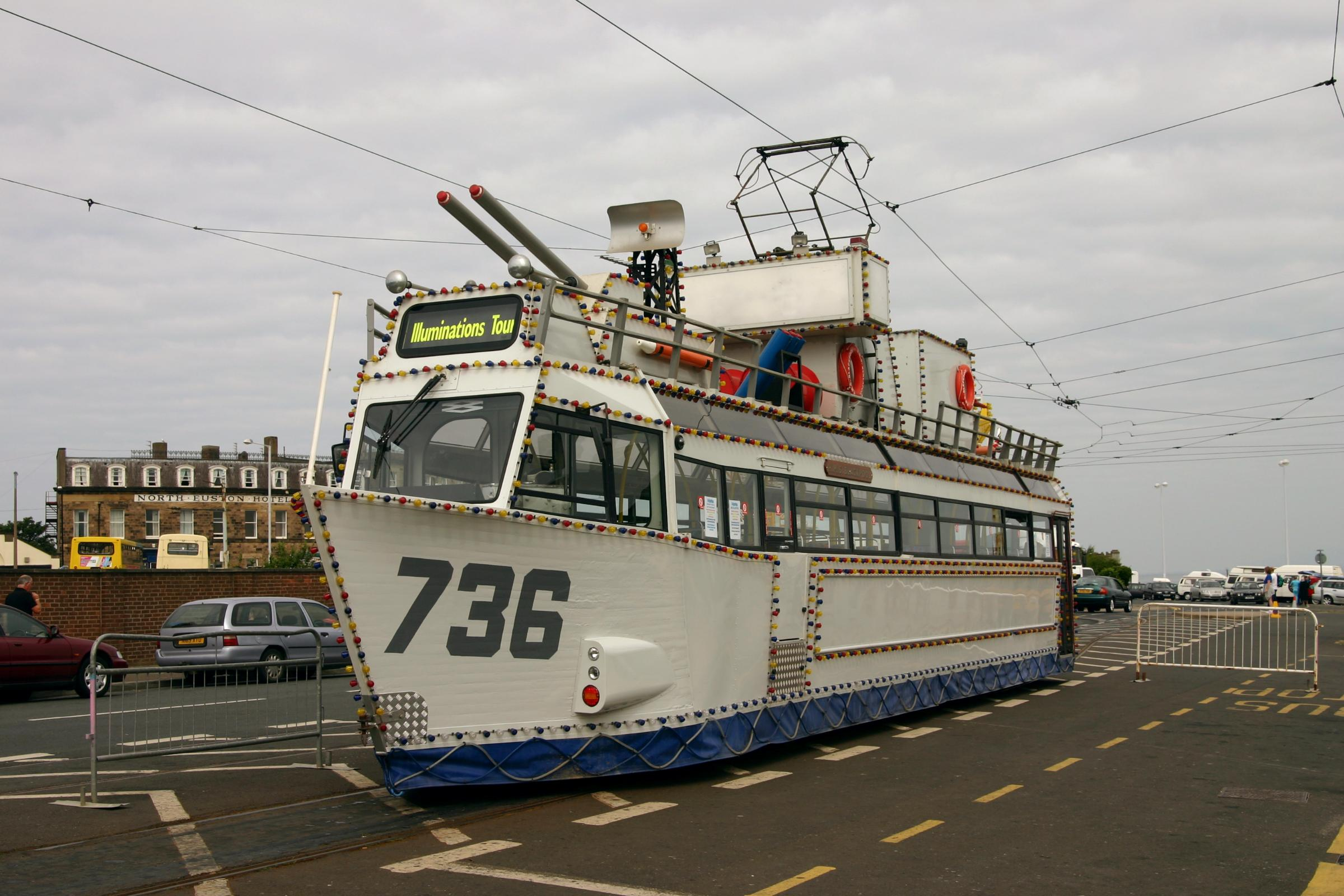
Illuminated tram No. 736 "HMS Blackpool" at Fleetwood

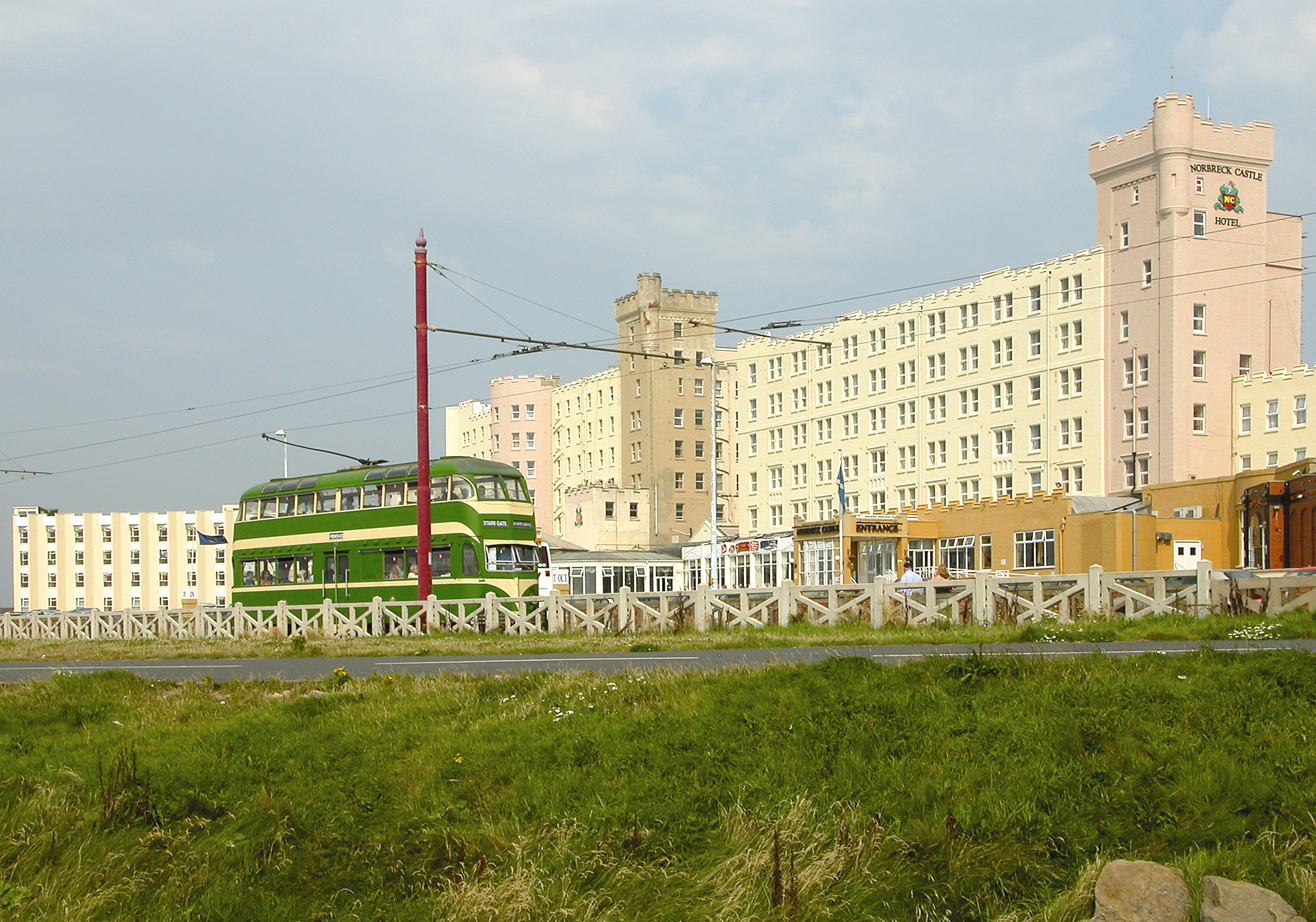
Balloon tram passing the Norbreck Castle Hotel

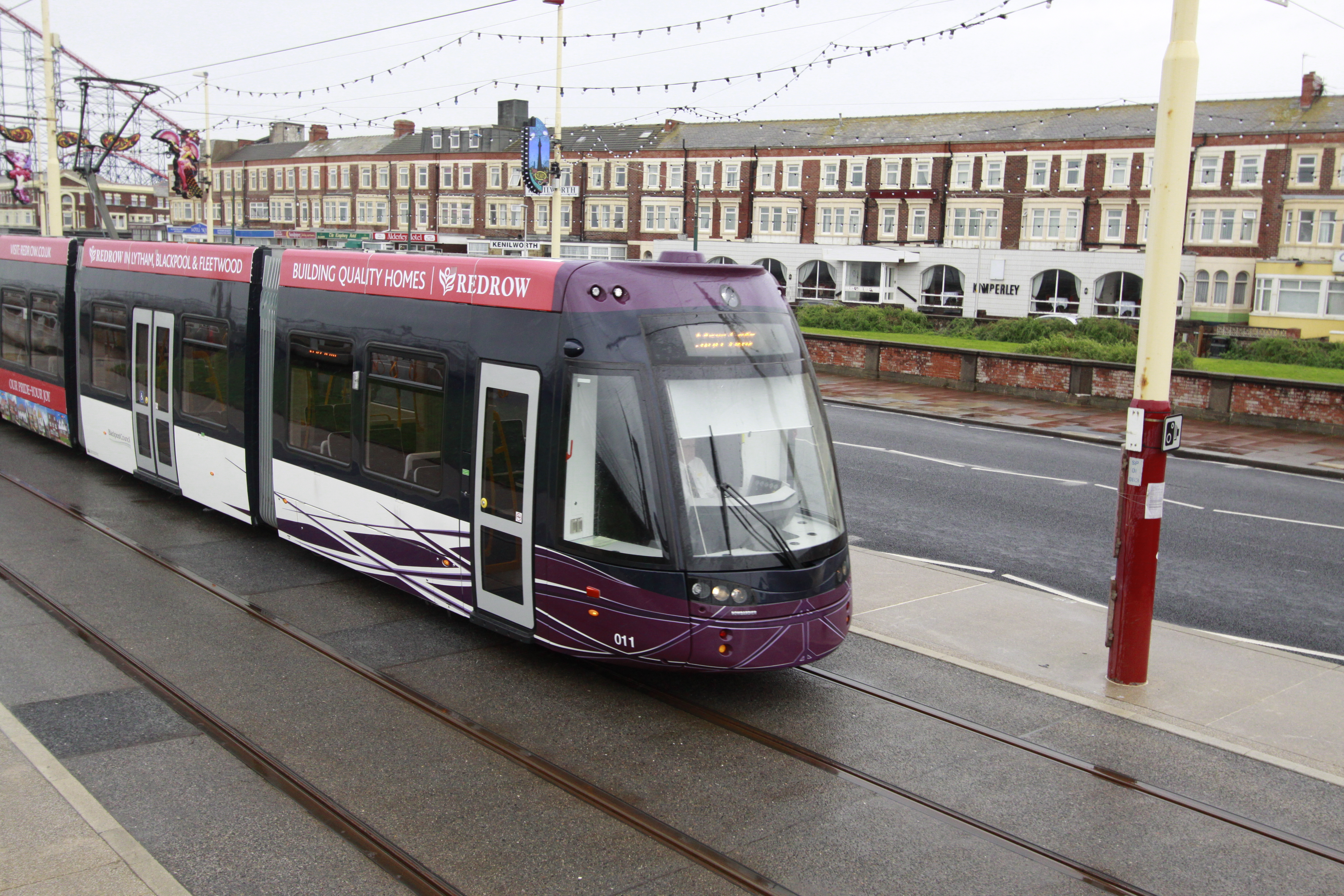
Flexity 2 type tram No. 011 at Burlington Road West tram stop

== See also ==
- List of Blackpool Tramway tram stops
- Light Rail Transit Association
- List of modern tramway and light rail systems in the United Kingdom
- List of town tramway systems in the United Kingdom
- Public transport in the Fylde
- Maley & Taunton
- Scottish Tramway and Transport Society
- Trams in Europe
