= Blackpool Heritage Trams =

Historic trams running in Lancashire, England

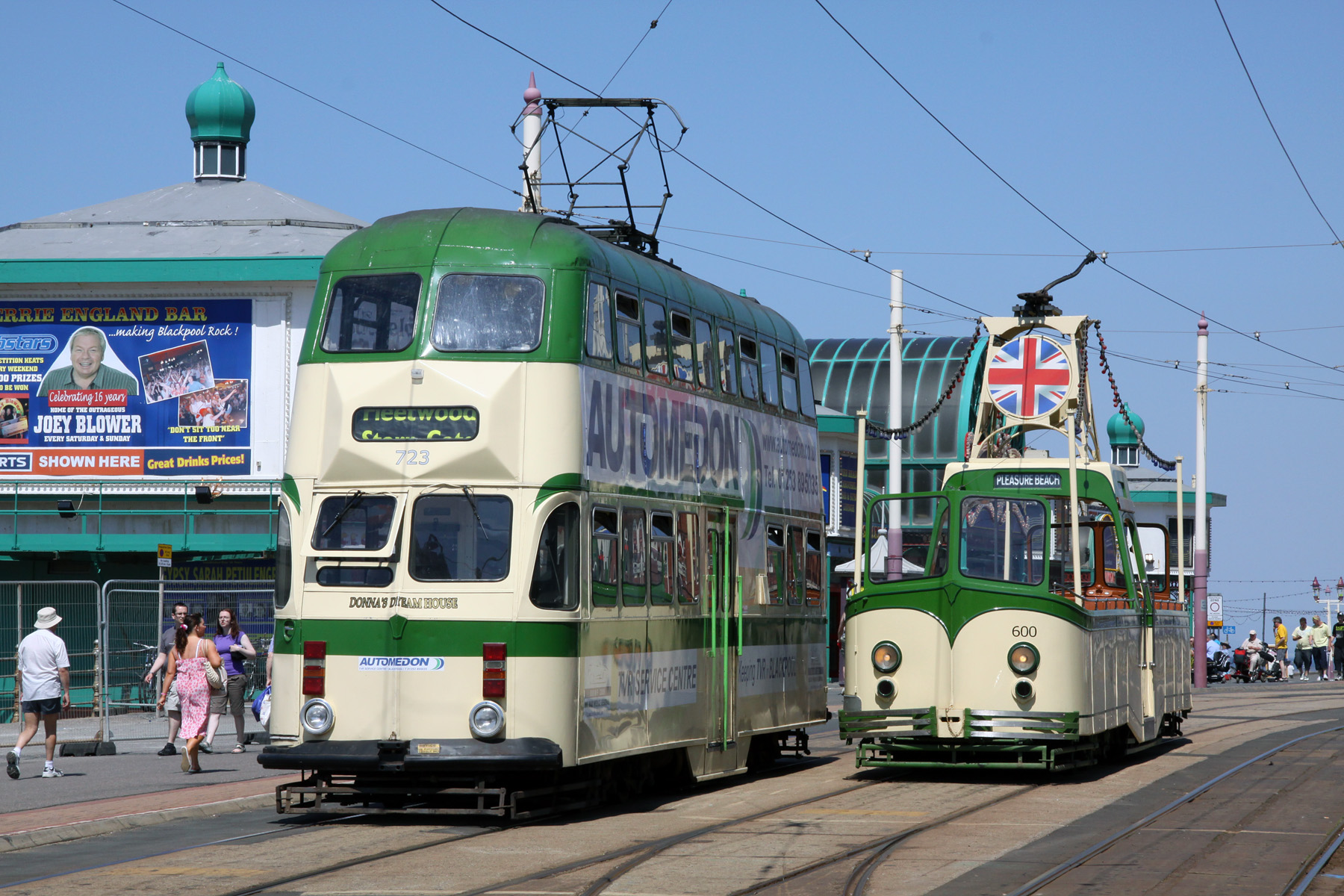
Two examples of the Blackpool Heritage Tram fleet at North Pier.

Blackpool Heritage Trams are a mixed fleet of restored vehicles that ran on the Blackpool Tramway, which runs from Blackpool to Fleetwood on the Fylde Coast in Lancashire, England. The line dates back to 1885 and is one of the oldest electric tramways in the world. The fleet is operated by Blackpool Transport (BT) and is the last surviving first-generation tramway in the United Kingdom. Excluding museums, it is one of only a few tramways in the world to still use double-decker trams. As of December 2024 the heritage service and fleet have been suspended until further notice.

Most services on the line are now operated by a fleet of modern Bombardier Flexity 2 trams, but a Heritage Tram service using the traditional trams previously operated on Bank Holidays, select weekdays and weekends through the year, as well as during the Blackpool Illuminations.

The Heritage fleet is a large fleet of vehicles that were mainly retained from previous generations of the town's tramway operations, as well as some from other locations. They are now operated by Blackpool Heritage Tram Tours between Pleasure Beach and North Pier as standard and can be caught at the 'Heritage Tram Tours' stops, identifiable by a green circular sign.

== History by type ==
Many different types of trams have served on the Blackpool Tramway over the years.

=== Conduit cars ===
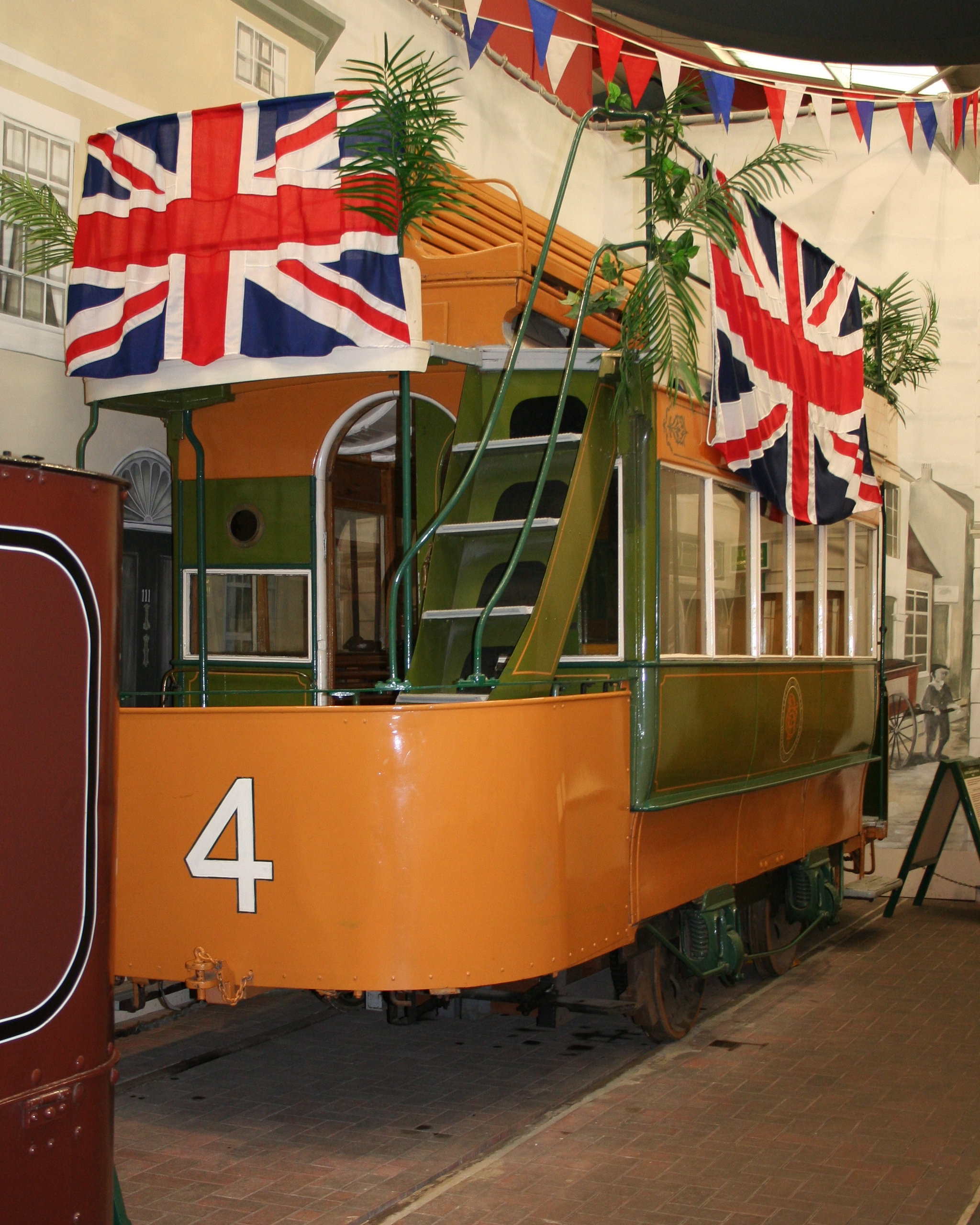
Conduit car No. 4

The Blackpool Tramway officially opened on 29 September 1885 with an initial fleet of 10 trams. The first eight were double-deck open top trams that operated on the conduit system, whilst the ninth and tenth cars were single-deck crossbench trailers which could be hauled by any of the first eight trams. The original fleet livery was a mix of sand, green and white colours. The trams were built in various conditions. Nos. 1 and 2 were built by Starbuck, with 48 seats and a garden seating arrangement on the upper decks. Nos. 3 and 4 were built by Lancaster Carriage and Wagon Works, with 32 seats and a knifeboard seating arrangement on the upper decks. Nos. 5 and 6 were also built by Lancaster and had a knifeboard seating arrangement on the upper decks, but they had a higher seating capacity of 44. Nos. 7 and 8 were built by Starbuck, with 56 seats and a crossbench seating arrangement on the upper and lower decks. Nos. 7 and 8 were originally open-sided, until they were rebuilt in 1895 with enclosed lower decks. Nos. 9 and 10 were built by Lancaster with open sides and 28 seats in a crossbench seating arrangement. In 1891, the two trailer cars were replaced by two new double-deck open top Conduit cars which were given the same numbers. The new 9 and 10 were built by G.F. Milnes, with 48 seats and a garden seating arrangement on the upper decks, just like nos. 1 and 2. Conduit car No. 4 is preserved by the National Tramway Museum in Crich.

=== Lancaster Palace cars ===
The Lancaster Palace cars were four trams built by Lancaster between 1894 and 1896. They were numbered 11–14. They first appeared in a green livery. They were the first trams in Blackpool to have two bogies each rather than four wheels fixed in place under the bodies.

=== Dreadnought cars ===
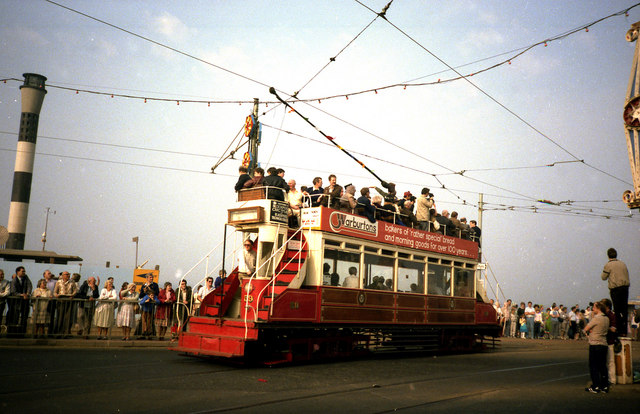
Dreadnought car No. 59

The Dreadnought cars were 20 trams built between 1898 and 1902 by G.F. Milnes. They were numbered 15–26 and 54–61. They first appeared in a green, teak and white livery. The design was unique to the Blackpool Tramway, with double staircases fitted at each end to access the upper decks whilst the driving compartments and access to the lower decks were in between the staircases. Dreadnought car No. 59 is preserved by the National Tramway Museum in Crich.

=== Marton Box cars ===
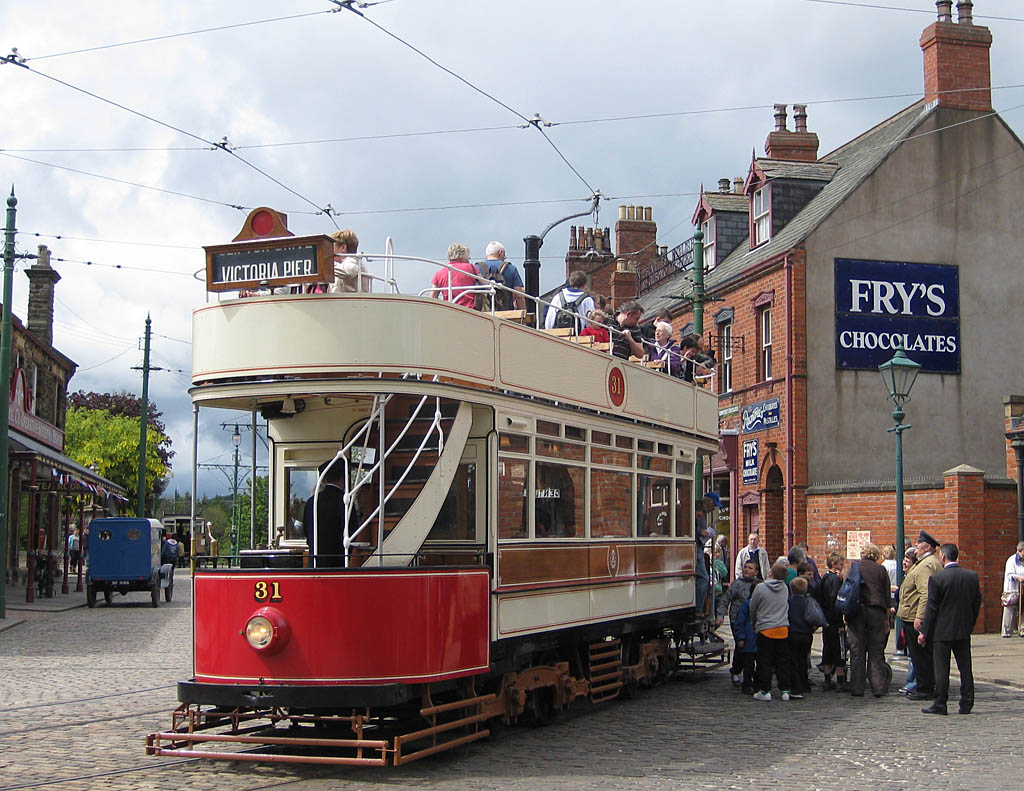
Marton Box car No. 31

The Marton Box cars were 15 open-top trams built in 1901 by the Midland Railway Carriage and Wagon Company. They were numbered 27–41. They first appeared in a green, teak and white livery. They were later rebuilt with enclosed upper decks. Marton Box car No. 31 has been on a long-term loan at the Beamish Museum since 1984.

=== Motherwell cars ===
The Motherwell cars were 12 open-top trams built in 1902. They were numbered 42–53. They were later rebuilt with enclosed upper decks. When they were all scrapped, they donated their top covered decks to the Standard cars.

=== De-Luxe cars ===
The De-Luxe cars were seven trams built in 1911. They were numbered 62–68. There were initially two variants of this class, with 62–64 built as 4 wheeled tramcars, whilst 65–68 were built as bogie tramcars. 62–64 were rebuilt with bogies by 1923. De-Luxe car No. 68 was decorated several times from 1912 with garlands and lights for various occasions. No. 68 was withdrawn in 1936 and scrapped in 1939.

=== Toastrack cars ===
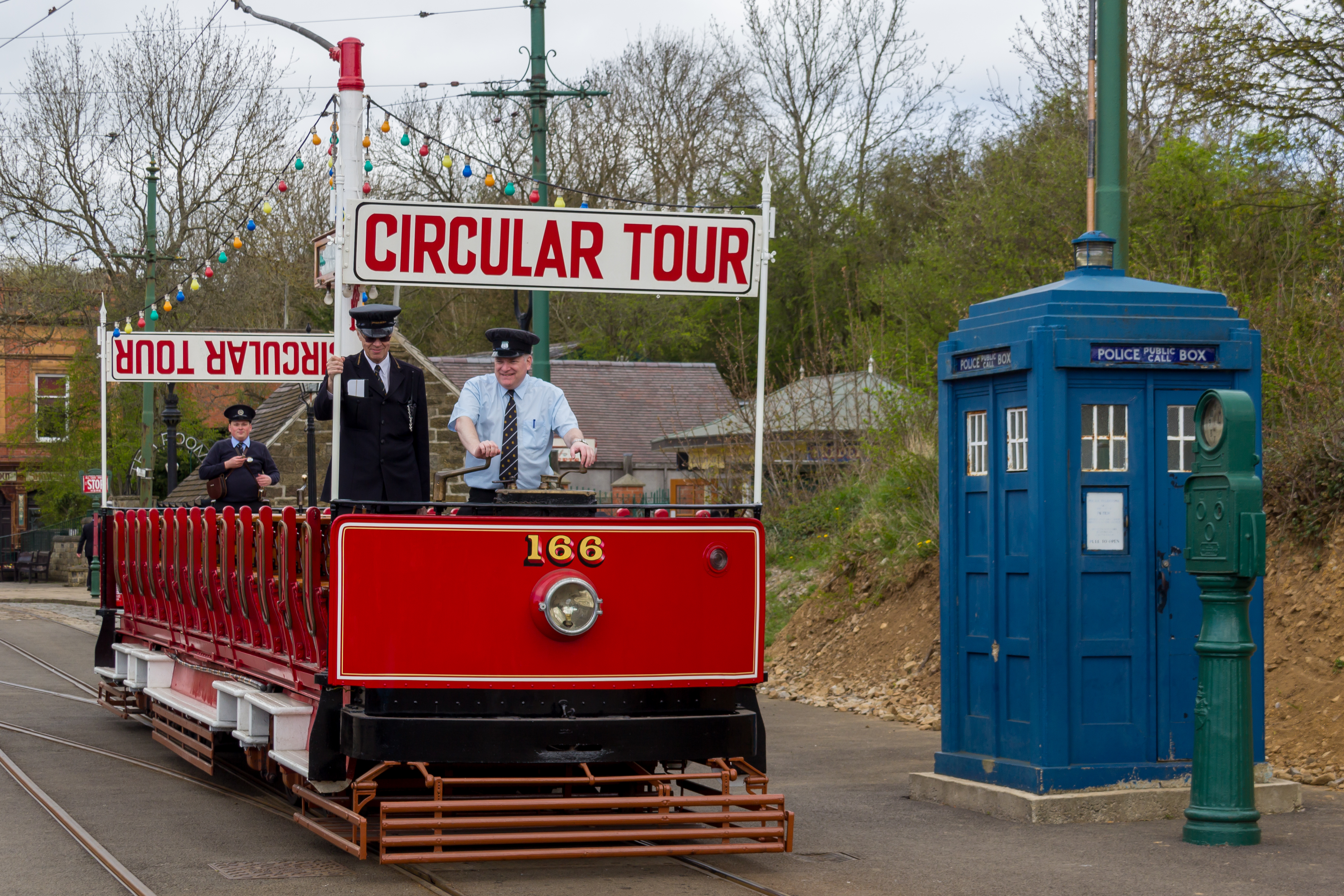
Toastrack car No. 166

The Toastrack cars were 30 trams built between 1911 and 1927. They were numbered 69–92 and 160–165, with No. 160 later being renumbered as No. 166 so that Standard car No. 160 could be numbered consecutively alongside Standards 142–159. They were named as Toastracks after the tableware item which holds toast. After being withdrawn from passenger service, Nos. 165 and 166 were converted between 1951 and 1953 for use on television filming assignments on the tramway. Toastrack car No. 163 was rebuilt in 1959 as the illuminated Blackpool Belle and after initially operating without a number in this form, it was renumbered 731 in 1968. Toastrack car No. 166 is preserved by the National Tramway Museum in Crich.

=== London cars ===
The former London United Tramways X class cars were 6 trams built in 1901 by G.F. Milnes and purchased for use on the Blackpool Tramway in 1919. They were originally numbered 108, 118, 125, 137, 149 and 150 in the London United Tramways fleet. They were renumbered 93–98 in the Blackpool tram fleet.

=== Fleetwood Box cars ===
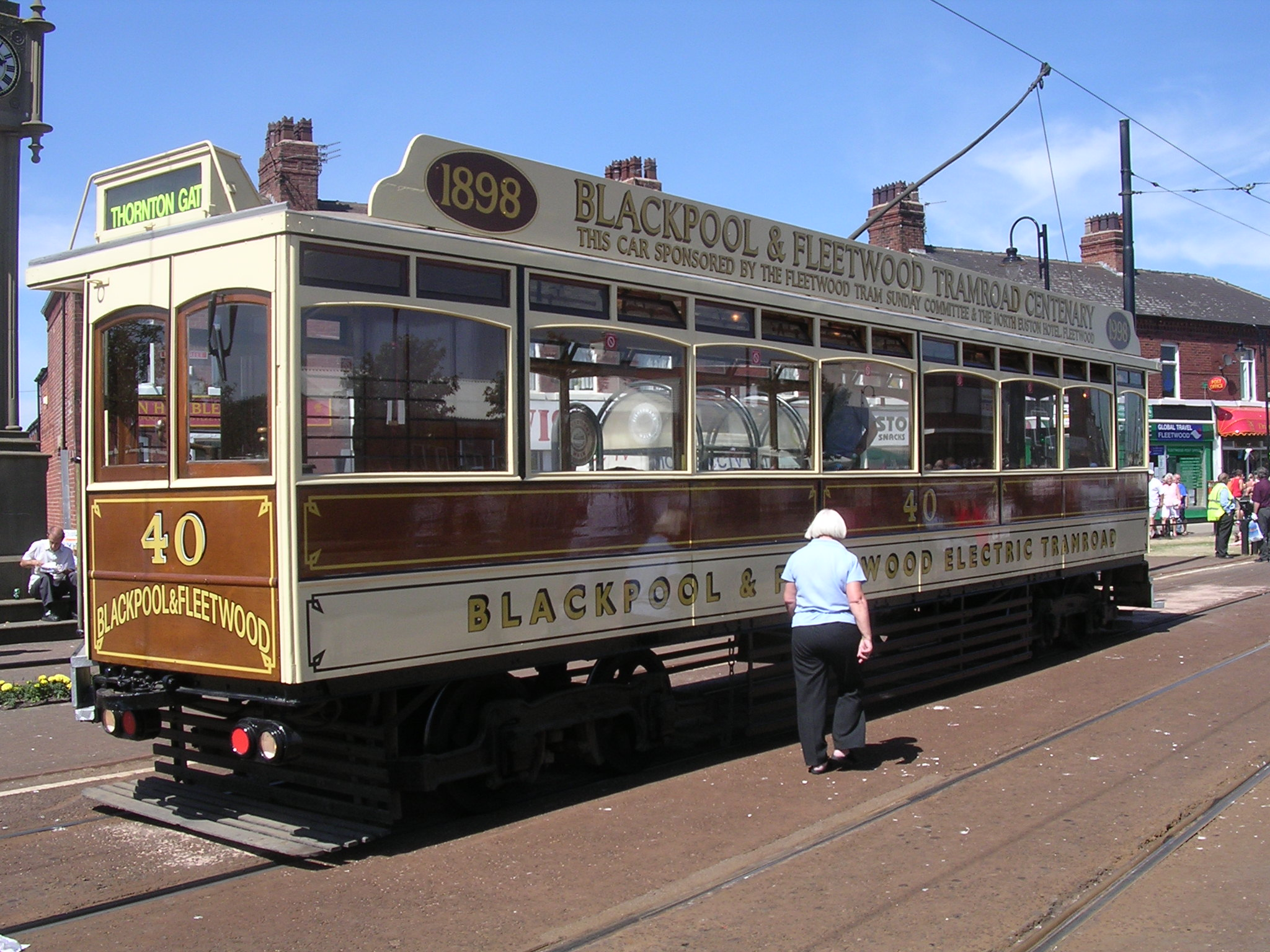
Box car No. 40

The Fleetwood Box cars were 15 trams built between 1898 and 1914 by G.F. Milnes. They were originally numbered 14–24 and 38–41 in the Blackpool and Fleetwood Tramroad fleet, before being renumbered 101–115 after purchase by Blackpool Corporation Transport in 1920. Box cars 20–24 became 101–105, Box cars 14–19 became 106–111 and Box cars 38–41 became 112–115. The last four cars were built without clerestory roofs and were known as New Fleetwood Box cars. Box car No. 40 (114) is preserved by the National Tramway Museum in Crich.

=== Fleetwood Yankee cars ===
The Fleetwood Yankee cars were seven partially open-sided combination trams built in 1899 by the Electric Railway & Tram Carriage Works. They were originally numbered 28–34 in the Blackpool and Fleetwood Tramroad fleet, before being renumbered 116–122 after purchase by Blackpool Corporation Transport in 1920. Apart from No. 30 (118), they were rebuilt with enclosed saloons between 1920–1921 and became known as Greenhouse and Glasshouse cars.

=== Fleetwood Vanguard cars ===
The Fleetwood Vanguard cars were three trams built in 1910 by United Electric Car Company. They were originally numbered 35–37 in the Blackpool and Fleetwood Tramroad fleet, before being renumbered 123–125 after purchase by Blackpool Corporation Transport in 1920. OMO car No. 7 was rebuilt as a replica Vanguard car in 1987 and was renumbered 619, its previous number when it was an English Electric Railcoach prior to its rebuild as an OMO car. It is preserved by the Heaton Park Tramway in Manchester.

=== Fleetwood Crossbench Rack cars ===
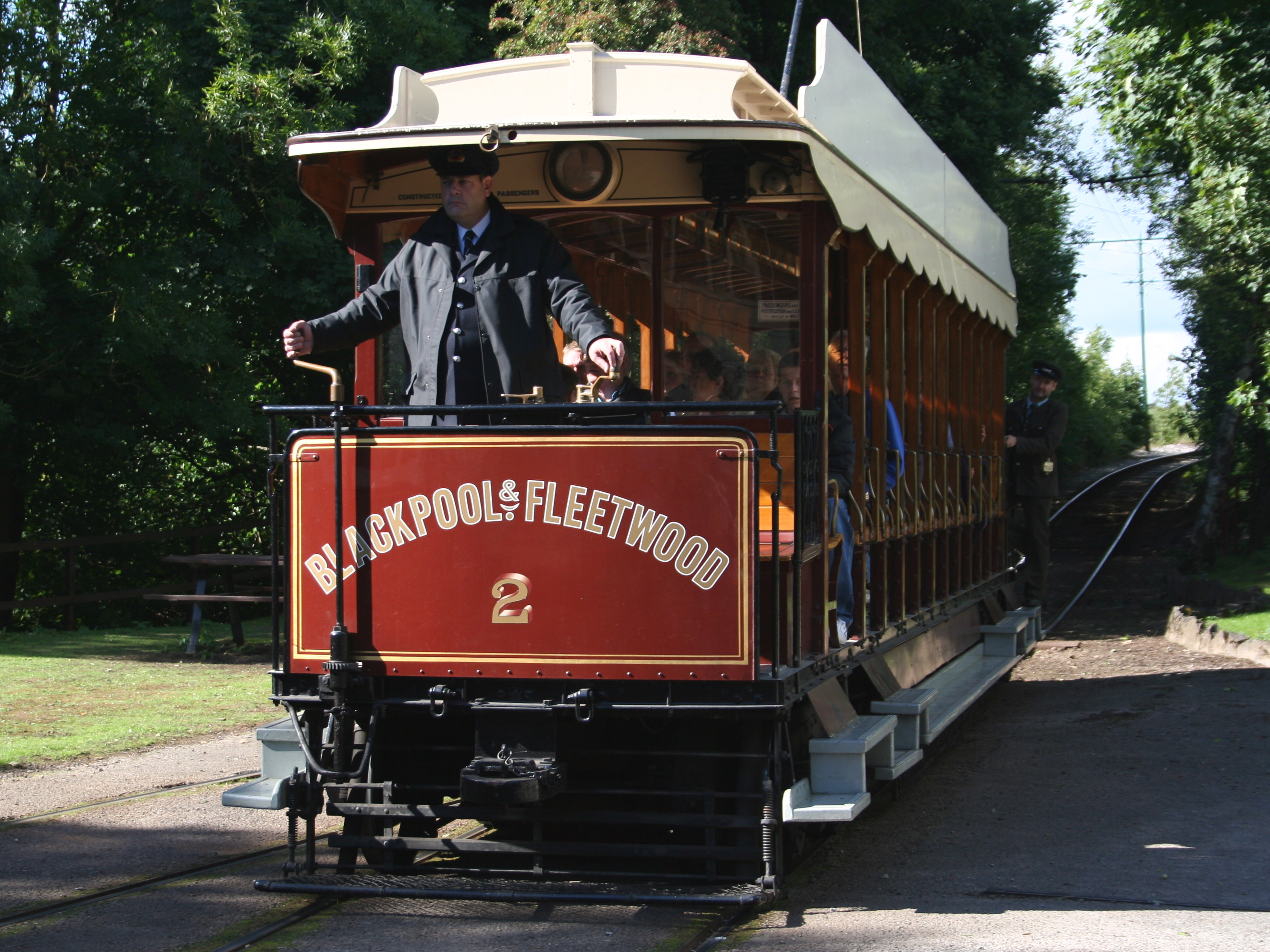
Crossbench Rack car No. 2

The Fleetwood Crossbench Rack cars were 16 open-sided trams built between 1898 and 1899 by G.F. Milnes. They were originally numbered 1–13 and 25–27 in the Blackpool and Fleetwood Tramroad fleet, before being renumbered 126–141 after purchase by Blackpool Corporation Transport in 1920. The Crossbench Rack cars were 1–10 (126–135) and 25–27 (139–141) and the trailer cars were 11–13 (136–138). The trailer cars were later converted to motor cars. Rack car No. 2 (127) is preserved by the National Tramway Museum in Crich.

=== Standard cars ===
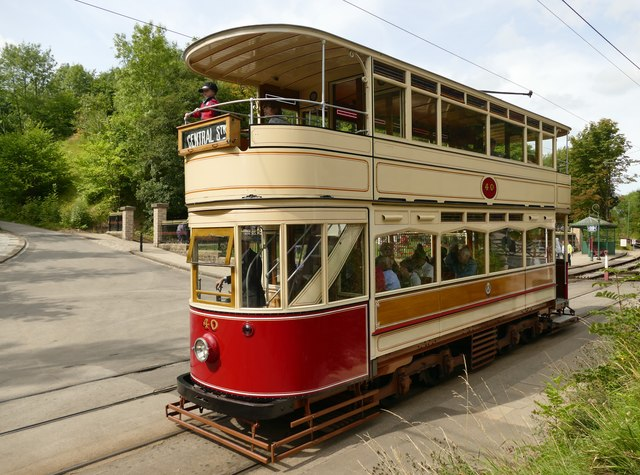
Standard car No. 40

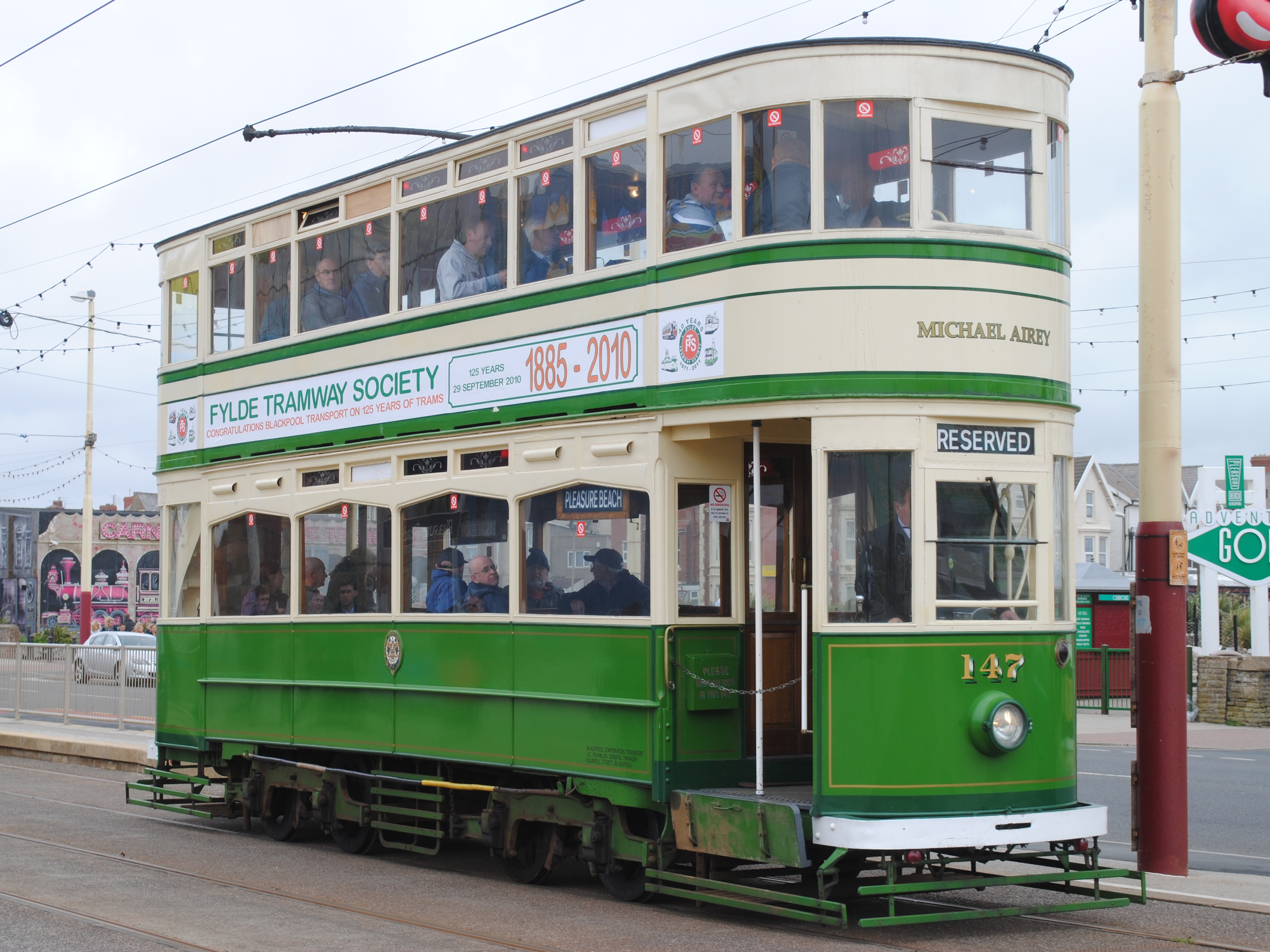
Standard car No. 147

The Standard cars were 42 trams built between 1923 and 1929 by the Blackpool Corporation Transport Department and Hurst Nelson in Motherwell. They were numbered in-consecutively, with the numbers being 28, 33–43, 45–51, 53, 99–100, 142–160 and 177. The Standard cars numbered 28, 33–43, 45–51 and 53 reused those numbers from the Marton Box and Motherwell trams that had been withdrawn. They are double-deck and have a capacity of 78 passengers, with 32 seats on the lower deck and 46 on the upper. The four-window design came from the 1902 Motherwell trams. They are 33 ft 10 in (10.31 m) long, 16 ft 7 in (5.05 m) high and 7 ft 2 in (2.18 m) wide. They had Preston McGuire bogies with 4 ft 1 in (1.24 m) wheelbase and 30 in (760 mm) diameter wheels, British Thomson-Houston B510 motors with hand and rheostatic brakes. All were built as the "open balcony" type, but in later years some were enclosed. The Standard cars were originally in service between 1923 and 1966, with their withdrawal being protracted from 1940. Standard car No. 40 became the last double-deck open balcony tram to operate commercially in Great Britain. Until 2002, no Standards survived in public service in Blackpool until Boat car No. 606 was given to the Trolleyville museum in the United States in 2000 in exchange for Standard car No. 147, which was restored to its enclosed condition and returned to service in April 2002.

Seven Standard cars were preserved. No. 40 is in near original condition with open balconies on the upper deck and is enclosed on the lower deck. It is in the red, teak and cream livery and is operational at the National Tramway Museum in Crich. No. 48 is in enclosed condition and is in the green and cream livery. It has been in the Oregon Electric Railway Historical Society collection in the United States since 1964. It operated on the Willamette Shore Trolley heritage tramway in Portland between 1995 and 2006 and then returned to the Oregon Electric Railway Museum, where it returned to service in 2017. No. 49 is enclosed and is in the green and cream livery. It is stored at the National Tramway Museum in Crich. No. 143 is in original open balcony form and is in the red, teak and cream livery. It is owned by the Fylde Transport Trust and was launched in Blackpool on 23 September 2019 but failed during this launch and is currently stored awaiting further repairs to enable it to return to service. No. 144 is in near original condition with open balconies on the upper deck and is enclosed on the lower deck. It is in the green and cream livery and is preserved at the Seashore Trolley Museum in Maine, United States. No. 147 is enclosed and is in the green and cream livery. It is stored in Blackpool. No. 159 is enclosed and is in the green and cream livery. It is operational at the East Anglia Transport Museum.

=== Pantograph cars ===
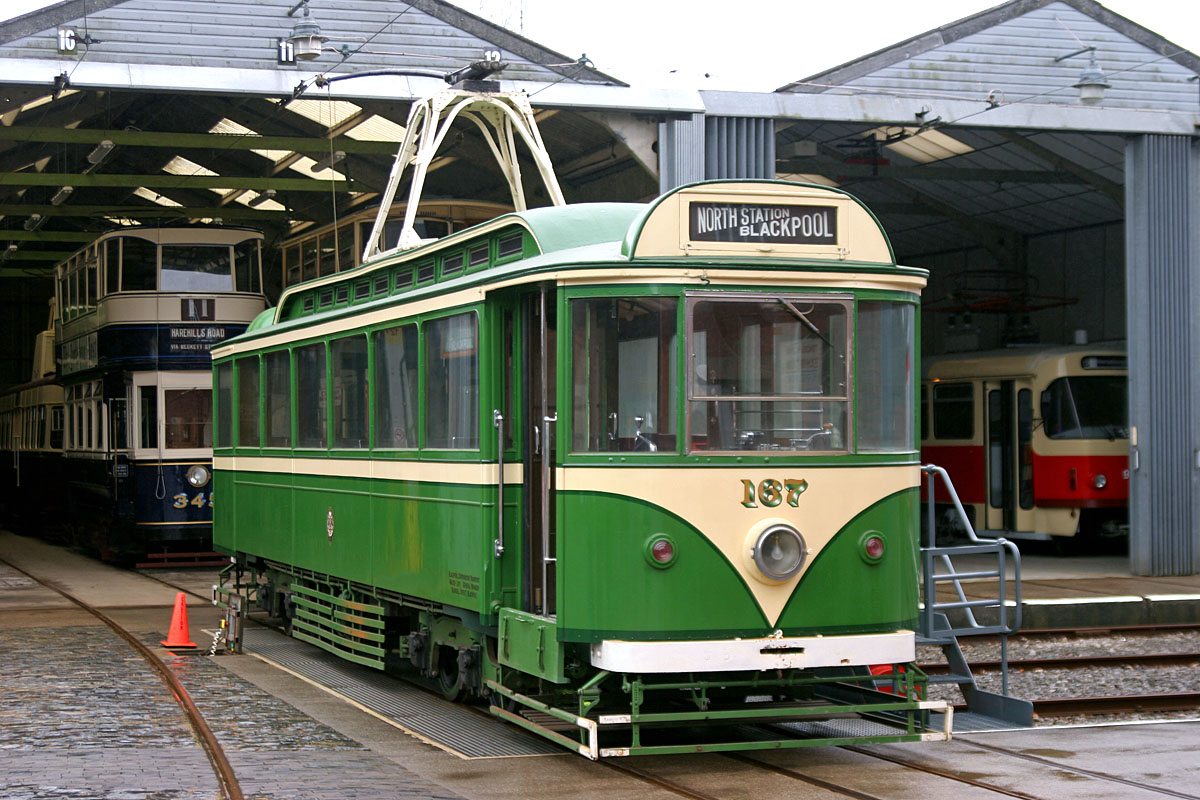
Pantograph car No. 167 at the National Tramway Museum, Crich

The Pantograph cars were 10 trams built in 1928 by English Electric in Preston. They were numbered 167–176. These cars were single-deckers and purchased at a cost of £2,000 (equivalent to £108,631 in 2025), by Blackpool Corporation Tramways. They were designed for interurban use and have an American style appearance with 48 seats. Originally given the nickname "Pullman" cars due to their more luxurious assets, they were the first trams in Blackpool to be equipped with a pantograph built by Brecknell, Munro & Rogers mounted on a tall tower, which quickly earned them the longer-lasting nickname "Pantographs". They were subsequently fitted with traditional trolley poles. The first car, No. 167, was delivered on 30 July 1928 and the last, No. 176, in 1929. They were 40 ft (12 m) long and 7 ft 6 in (2.29 m) wide, had Dick Kerr bogies, BTH B510 motors and air-brakes, with hand and rheostatic brakes.

The sole surviving true member of the class, No. 167, is preserved at the National Tramway Museum in Crich. It returned to Blackpool for the 100th and 125th anniversary celebrations in 1985 and 2010, in 1998 for the 100th anniversary of the Blackpool and Fleetwood Tramroad and for a short loan during Summer 2014. Three ex-Pantograph cars survive as illuminated cars: No. 174 is recognisable as the trailer (renumbered 734) to the illuminated Western Train, which received a £278,000 Heritage Lottery Fund grant for restoration in 2006 and is part of the heritage fleet. No. 170 formed the basis for the illuminated Frigate (renumbered 736) in 1965 and still resembled a Pantograph car from the back end, until it was rebuilt again in 2004, altering its appearance and removing the last remnants of its Pantograph car shape. No. 168 formed the basis for the illuminated Rocket (renumbered 732) which was withdrawn from service in 1999 and stood derelict at Rigby Road Depot until 2012 when it was cosmetically restored and displayed as a static exhibit as part of the Illuminations. It has since returned to Rigby Road Depot for storage and eventual restoration as an operational tram within the heritage fleet.

=== English Electric Railcoach cars ===
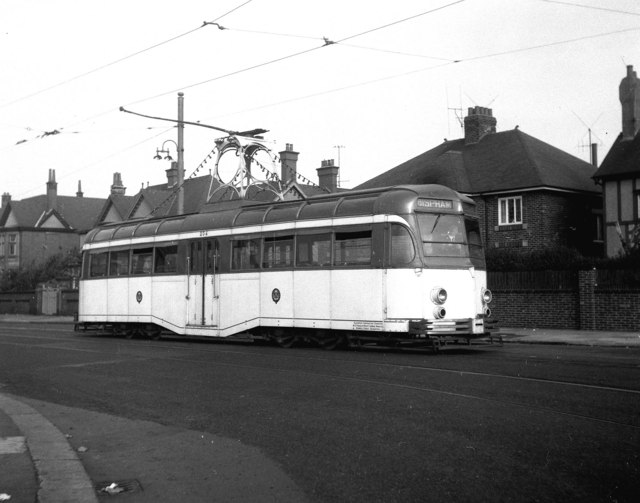
English Electric Railcoach car No. 204 at Squires Gate

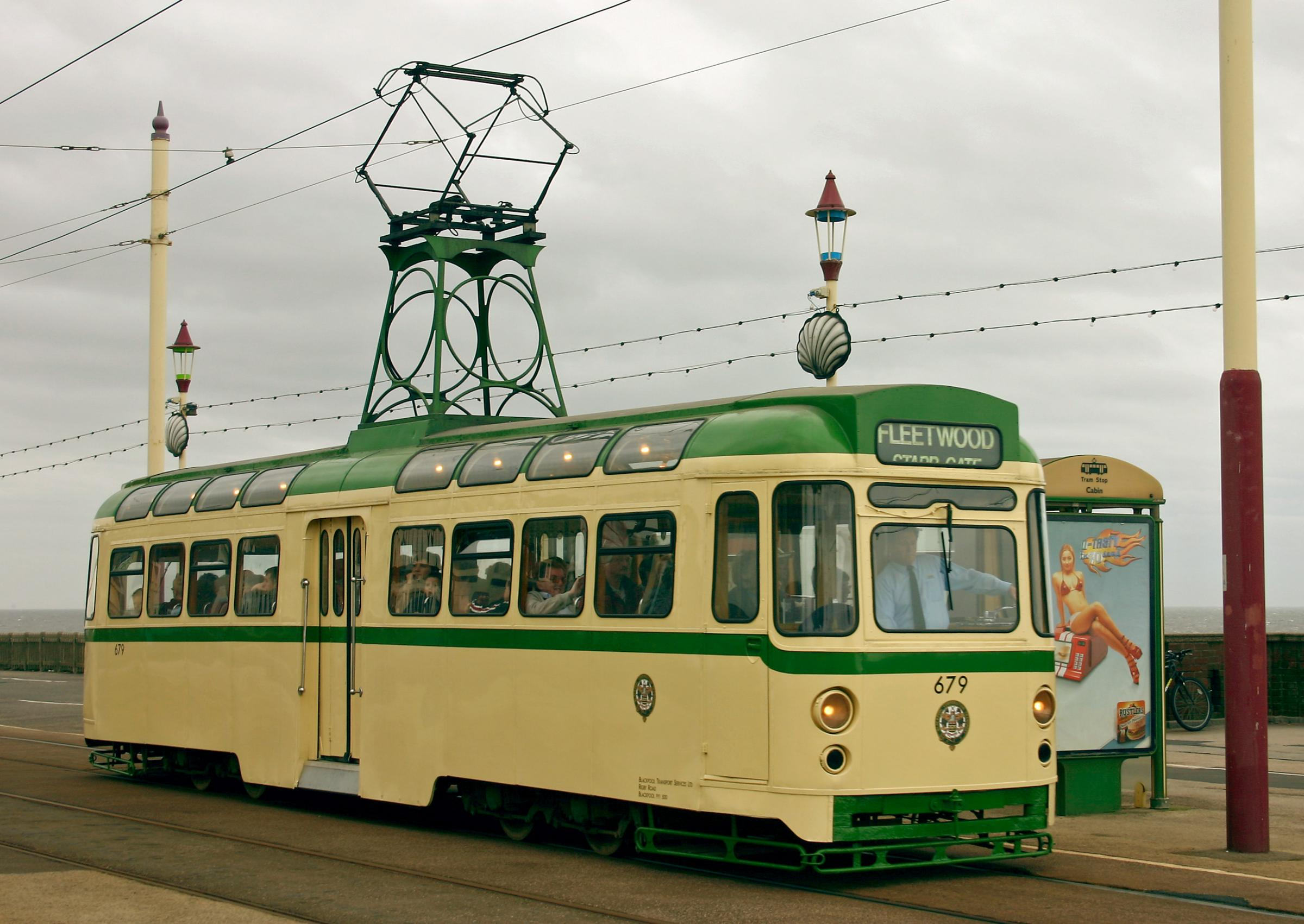
Modified Railcoach car No. 679 at Bispham

The English Electric Railcoach cars were 45 streamlined enclosed single-deck trams built by English Electric between 1933 and 1935. They were numbered 200–224 and 264–283. None of these remained in their original form, with 10 cars (272–281) rebuilt as towing cars for the Progress Twin Set cars in the 1950s and 1960s, 2 cars rebuilt as illuminated cars in the 1960s (209 as the Western Train Locomotive and 222 as the Hovertram), No. 264 rebuilt in 1964 with flat cab-ends and rounded corners, No. 618 (271) rebuilt in 1968 with tapered cab-ends and the last 11 surviving cars as well as Nos. 264 and 618 (220–221, 224, 264–271 and 282–283) rebuilt as the One-Man Operated (OMO) cars in the 1970s. The other 20 cars were scrapped.

English Electric Railcoach car No. 264 was rebuilt in 1964 with flat cab-ends and rounded corners, resembling the Coronation and Twin Set cars. No. 264 was also given exterior plastic panelling to reduce its weight, but was returned to aluminium panelling due to the plastic warping and becoming discoloured. No. 264 became No. 611 in 1968. English Electric Railcoach car No. 618 was rebuilt in 1968 with tapered cab-ends, increasing its capacity from 48 to 56. Prior to being rebuilt as the OMO cars, the last 11 cars remaining in their original form, as well as Nos. 264 and 618 (271) were renumbered in 1968: 220–221 became 608–609, 224 became 610, 264–271 became 611–618 and 282–283 became 619–620.

The former Twin Set towing cars 678–680 (278–280) were converted back to single trams with cabs at both ends. English Electric Railcoach tram No. 679 was given an all-over advert for Mecca Bingo in 1994, which featured two big fibreglass bears fitted to the roof, with one on each end. The advert and fibreglass bears were removed in 1995. The last of these in the active fleet, No. 680, was withdrawn in 2008. 678 was preserved by Fleetwood Heritage Leisure Trust in 2011, but was scrapped in 2023. 679 was preserved by the Fylde Transport Trust in 2008. In 2013, 679 joined the heritage fleet in Blackpool and will eventually be restored into original condition and regain its original pre-1968 number as 279. 680 was preserved at the Heaton Park Tramway in Manchester in 2011. During December 2013, 680 was transferred to Beamish Museum for an operational loan deal and entered service there. In April 2015, No. 680 was transferred to its permanent home at Heaton Park Tramway and entered service there. In August 2015, No. 680 was transferred to Blackpool for an initial 2-year loan and was repainted into 1990s green and cream livery with black window surrounds.

=== Boat cars ===
Boat car
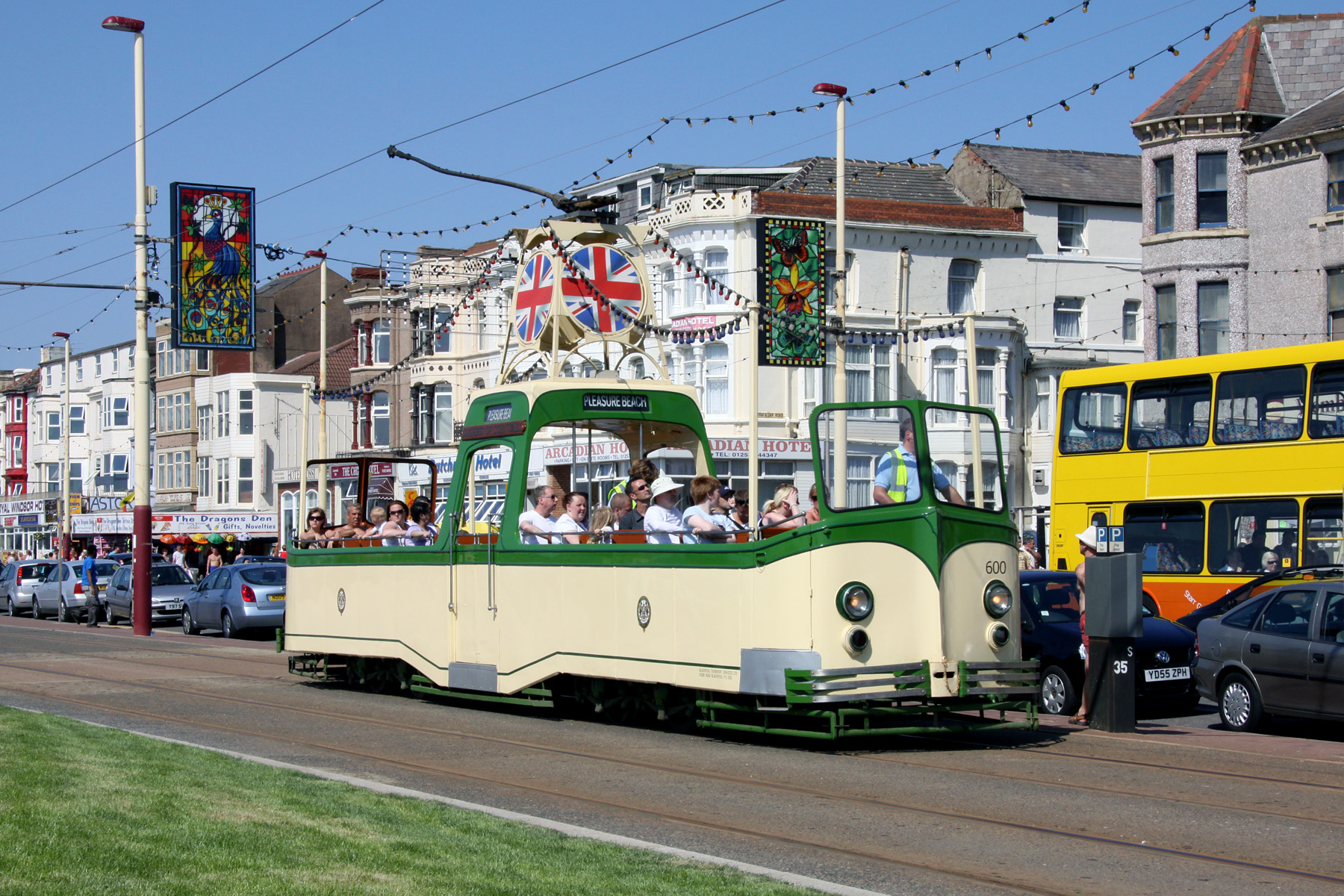
- Boat car No. 600 by Trafalgar Road
- Constructed: English Electrics 1934
- Capacity: 52–56 Passengers (Seated)

Specifications
- Width: EE 4 ft (1.2 m) wheelbase
- Power output: 2xEE 327, 40 hp (30 kW)
- Power supply: 2xEE 327, 40 hp (17.5 kW)
- Track gauge: 4 ft 8 1/2 in (1,435 mm)
- Controller: 600, 607: 2xEE DB1; 602, 604, 605: 2xEE Z type 603 (228): 2xEE B18

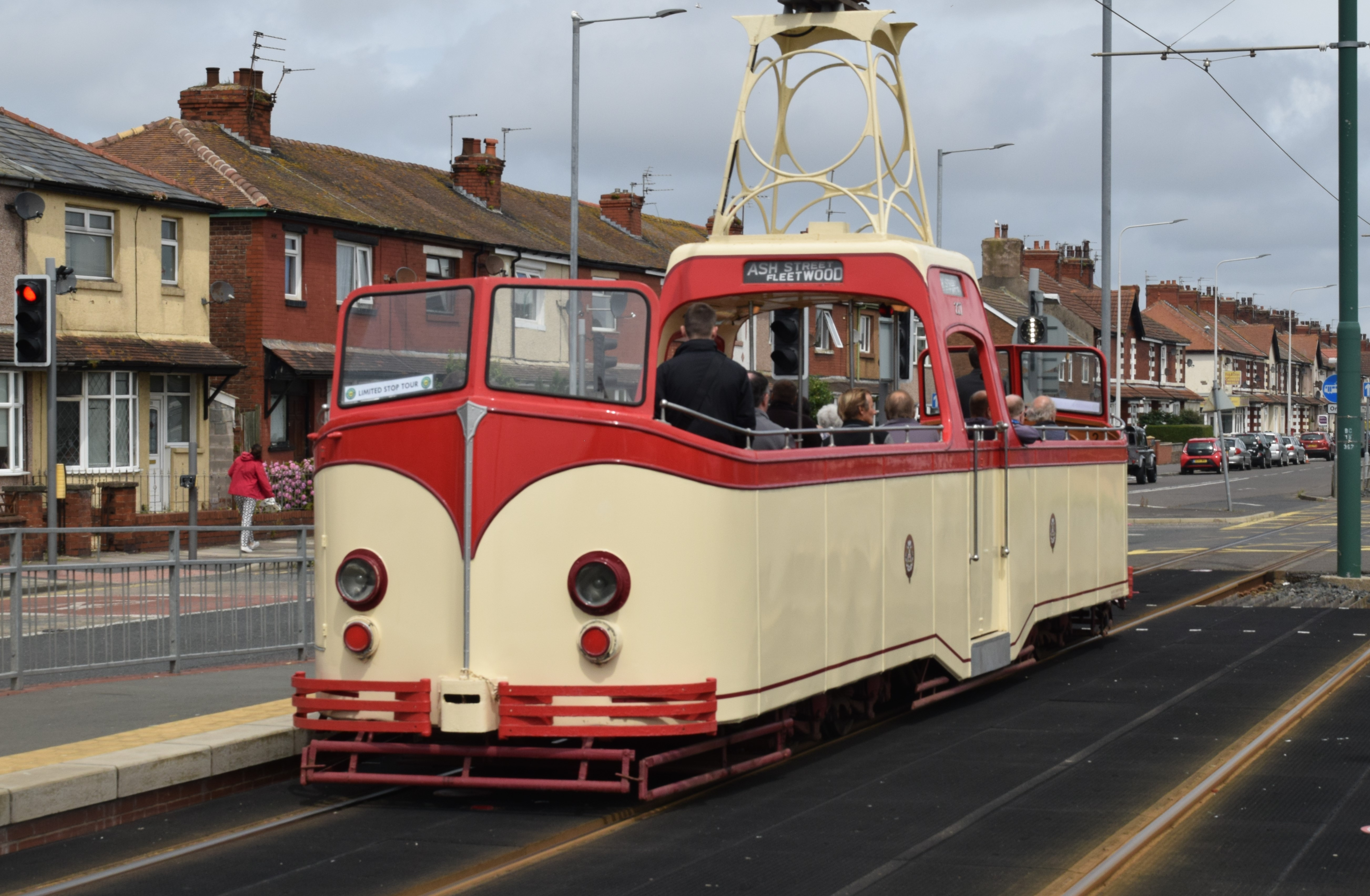
Boat car No. 227 at Stanley Road, Fleetwood

The Boat cars were 12 single-deck open-topped trams with central doors and gangway built by English Electric in 1934. The Boat cars, originally called Luxury Toastrack cars, were commissioned by Walter Luff in 1933, in accordance with his five-year plan. The prototype arrived in Blackpool in January 1934. After an initial trial period, company directors approved an order for 11 production cars, which arrived in July and August 1934. They first appeared in the 1930s style green and cream livery. They were originally numbered 225–236, with eight surviving cars being renumbered 600–607 in 1968.

The prototype was numbered 225, with the first production car being numbered 227, due to the first Balloon car being numbered 226, as that car had arrived with 225 in Blackpool before the production Boat cars. The second to tenth production cars were numbered 228–236. The first Balloon car was renumbered 237 to fit the number sequence of the Balloon cars after the number sequence of the Boat cars. The eleventh production car was therefore numbered 226. The Boat cars have a passenger capacity of between 52 and 56. They became better known as "boats" than "Luxury Toastracks" due to their ship-like streamlined appearance and are one of the most iconic Blackpool tram types. All cars are virtually identical except for the prototype 600, which has shorter body panels.

Work began on the circular and coastal tours, replacing the original Toastrack cars, which were considered dangerous and old-fashioned. They were stationed at both Rigby Road and Marton depots for ease of access and continued there until the outbreak of World War II, when they were stored out of service due to the withdrawal of the circular tour and general lack of demand. This continued until 1946, when they returned to work on the promenade service.

They remained in regular service until the closure of the inland routes during 1963. The fleet was reduced to eight and renumbered 600–607, with 229, 231, 232 and 234 being mothballed and scrapped in 1968.

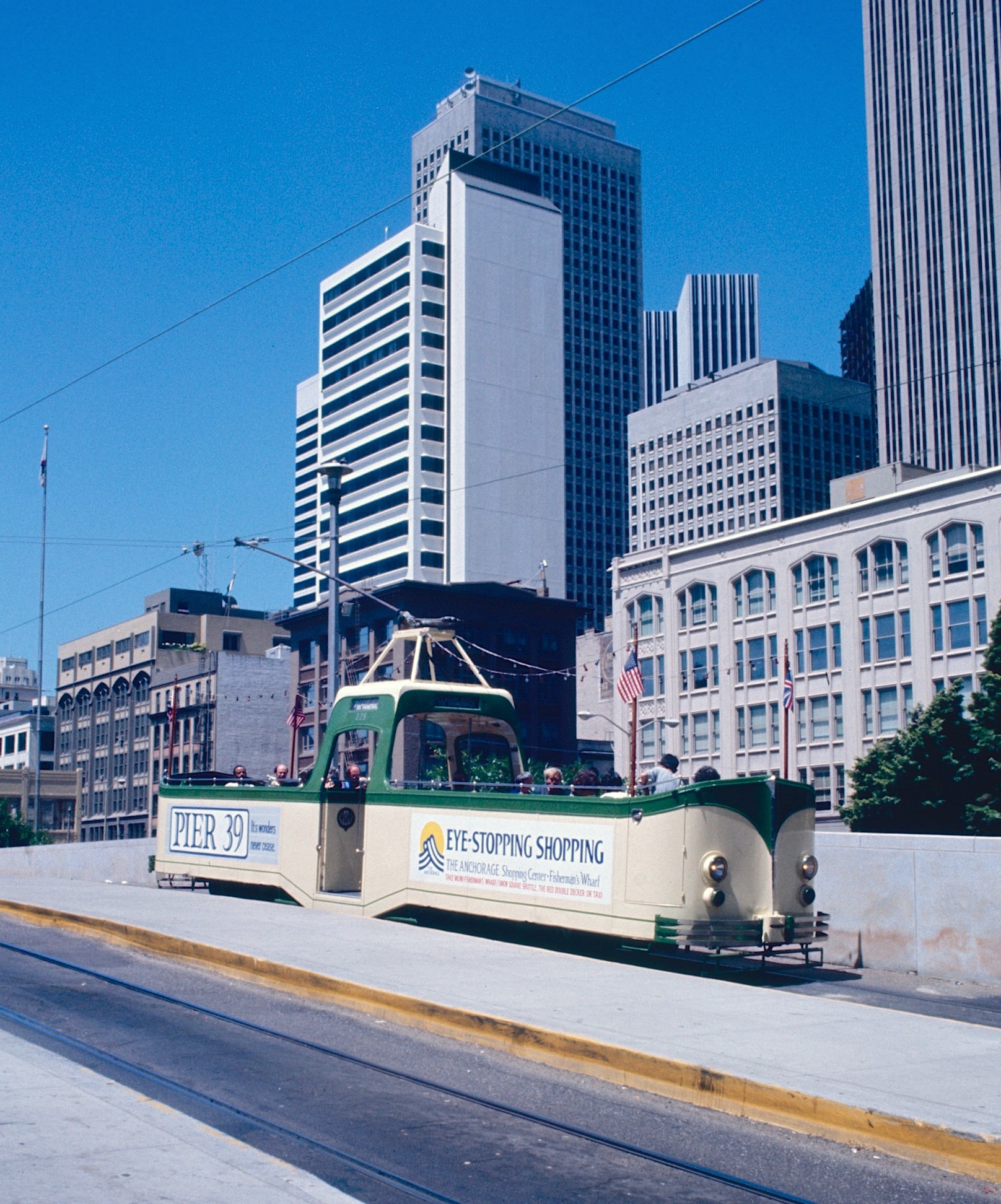
Car 226 operating in the 1983 San Francisco Historic Trolley Festival

The fleet was further reduced in the 1970s. Car 601 (226) was the first to be preserved and has been at the Western Railway Museum, Suisun City, California, United States, since 1971, renumbered back to its original pre-1968 number as 226. It operated in the San Francisco Historic Trolley Festival in 1983 and 1984. Car 603 (228) was loaned to Philadelphia in 1976 for the United States Bicentennial, then returned to Blackpool where it was stored until 1984, when it was then given to the San Francisco Municipal Railway (Muni), where it operates with its original pre-1968 fleet number as 228.

In the 1990s the six remaining Boat cars were refurbished and given new liveries, including 1930s green and cream for 600, black and yellow for 602, AEC Routemaster red and white for 604, a fictitious wartime green and cream livery for 605, blue and yellow for 606 and green and yellow for 607.

The fleet was further reduced when car 606 was given to the Trolleyville Museum, Ohio, United States, in September 2000, in return for Standard 147, which was restored to its enclosed condition. Following the closure of the Trolleyville museum, 606 was sold to the National Capital Trolley Museum, in Maryland.

During 2009–2010, 600 underwent a major overhaul and rebuild, the first boat to undergo such high maintenance. Work included the fitting of modern safety features such as halogen headlights and a rubber bumper and fibreglass skirt on each end. It has the original 1930s green and cream livery.

In 2012, 607 was preserved by the National Tramway Museum in Crich and moved there following restoration in Blackpool. It is in service, repainted in 1950s green and cream livery and renumbered back to its original pre-1968 fleet number as 236.

In June 2012, 604 returned to service repainted in 1970s green and cream livery with sponsorship from the George Formby Society. It was named "George Formby OBE" and renumbered back to its original pre-1968 fleet number as 230. It is currently out of service awaiting a rewire.

Car 233 in San Francisco in 2026

In August 2013, 602 returned to service repainted in a fictitious style of Blackpool Corporation red and cream livery and was renumbered back to its original pre-1968 fleet number as 227. In October 2018, following a rewire and interior overhaul to original condition, 227 was named Charlie Cairoli.

In October 2013, 605 (233) was delivered to San Francisco Muni and renumbered back to its original pre-1968 number as 233 to supplement 228.

=== Balloon cars ===
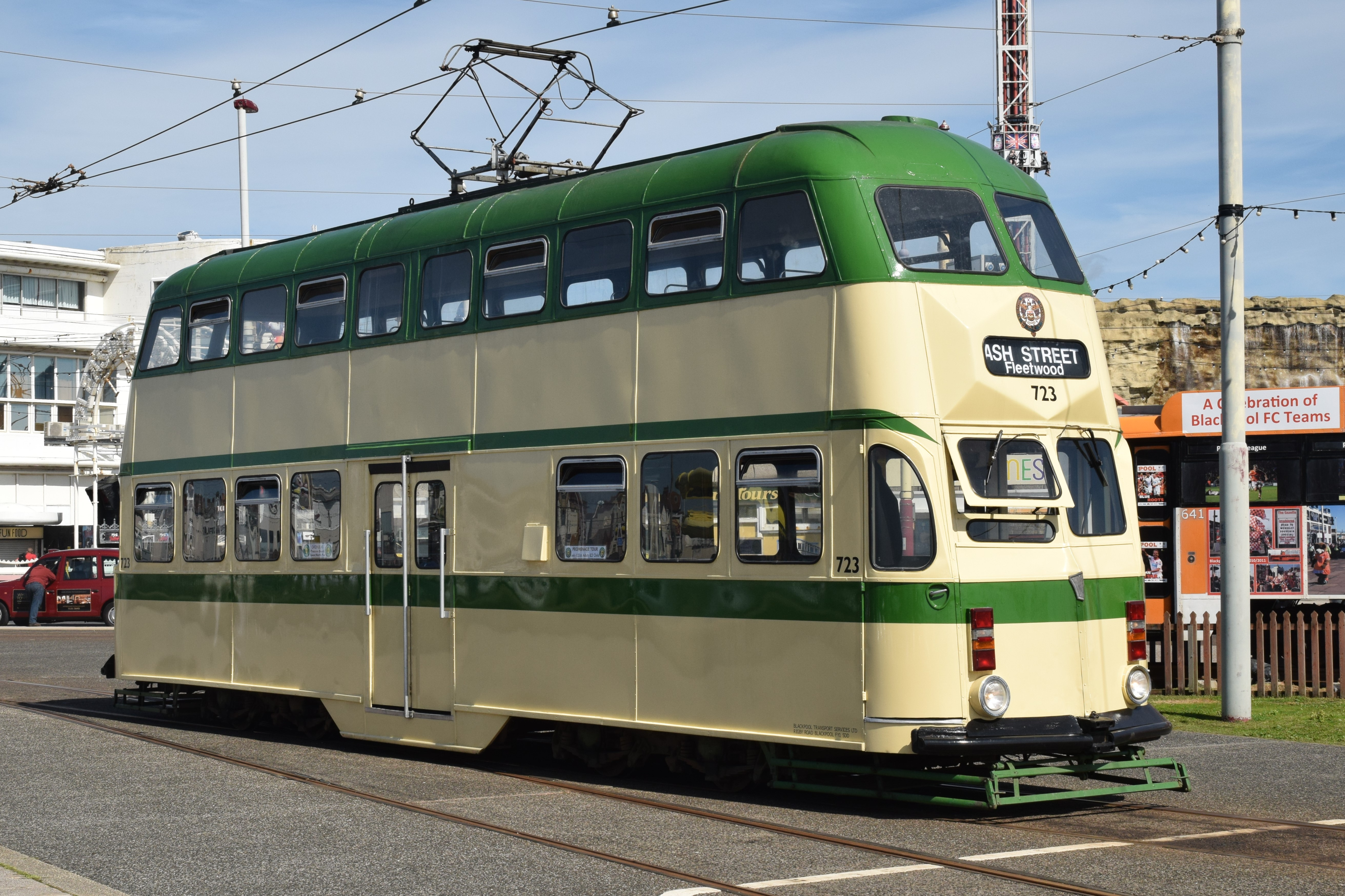
English Electric Balloon car No. 723

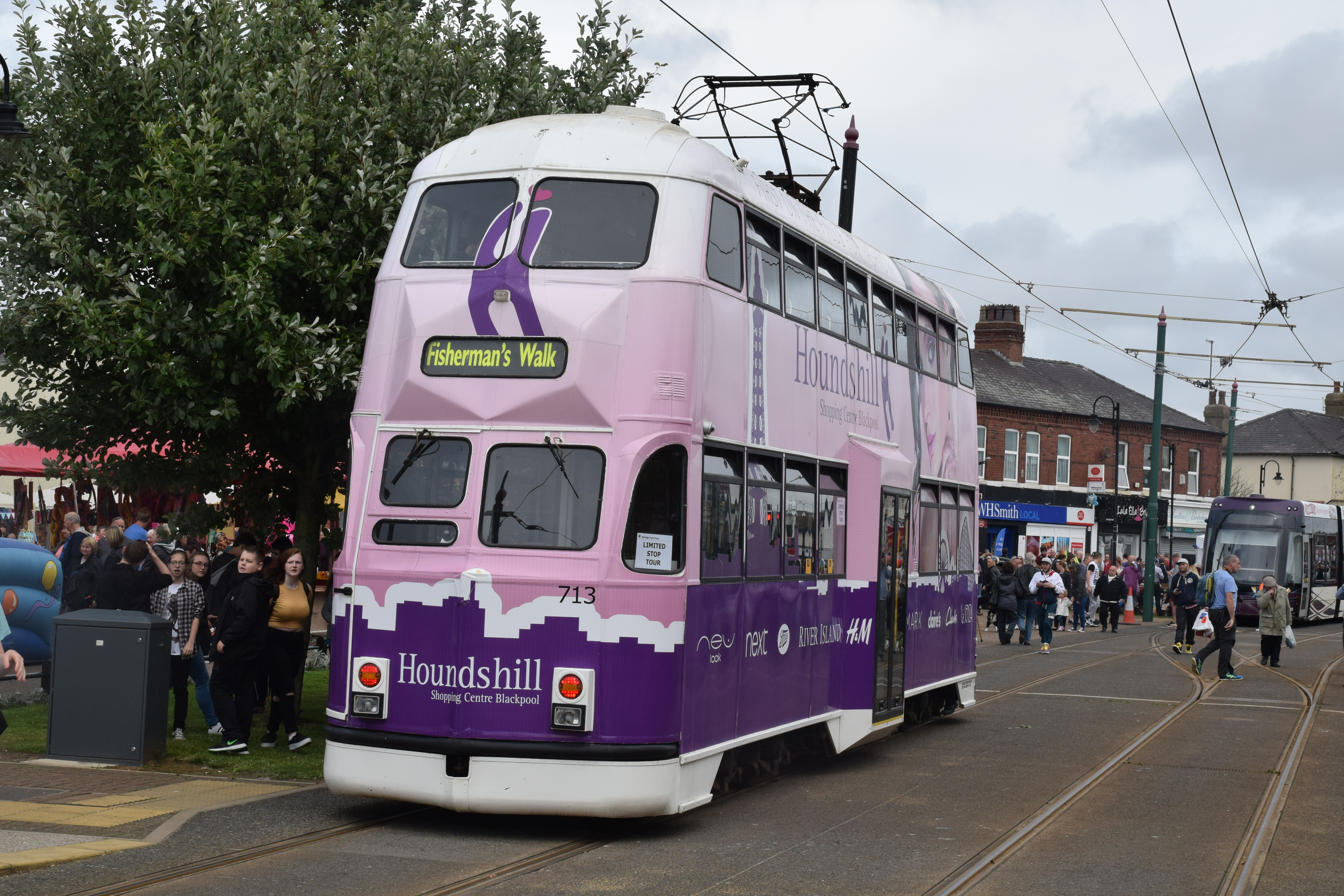
Modified Balloon car No. 713 at Fisherman's Walk, Fleetwood

The Balloon cars were 27 cars built by English Electric between 1934 and 1935, the first thirteen to an open top design and the last fourteen to an enclosed design. The first Balloon car was numbered 226 but was renumbered 237 to fit the number sequence of the Balloon cars after the Boat cars. They were numbered 237–263 and renumbered 700–726 in 1968. All the open topped cars were enclosed during World War II, but 706 has since been restored to an open topped car. A number of them have since been rebuilt in various conditions to modernise and improve the usefulness of the cars, with 700, 707, 709, 711, 713, 718, 719, 720 and 724 added to the 'B' fleet. Balloon cars 701, 703, 704, 706, 710, 715, 717 and 723 were retained or returned to the tramcar collection for use within the heritage fleet. Balloon cars 714 and 725 were rebuilt as Jubilee cars. Balloon cars 702, 708, 712, 721 and 726 were preserved outside of Blackpool. Balloon cars 705, 716 and 722 were scrapped.

=== Brush Railcoach cars ===
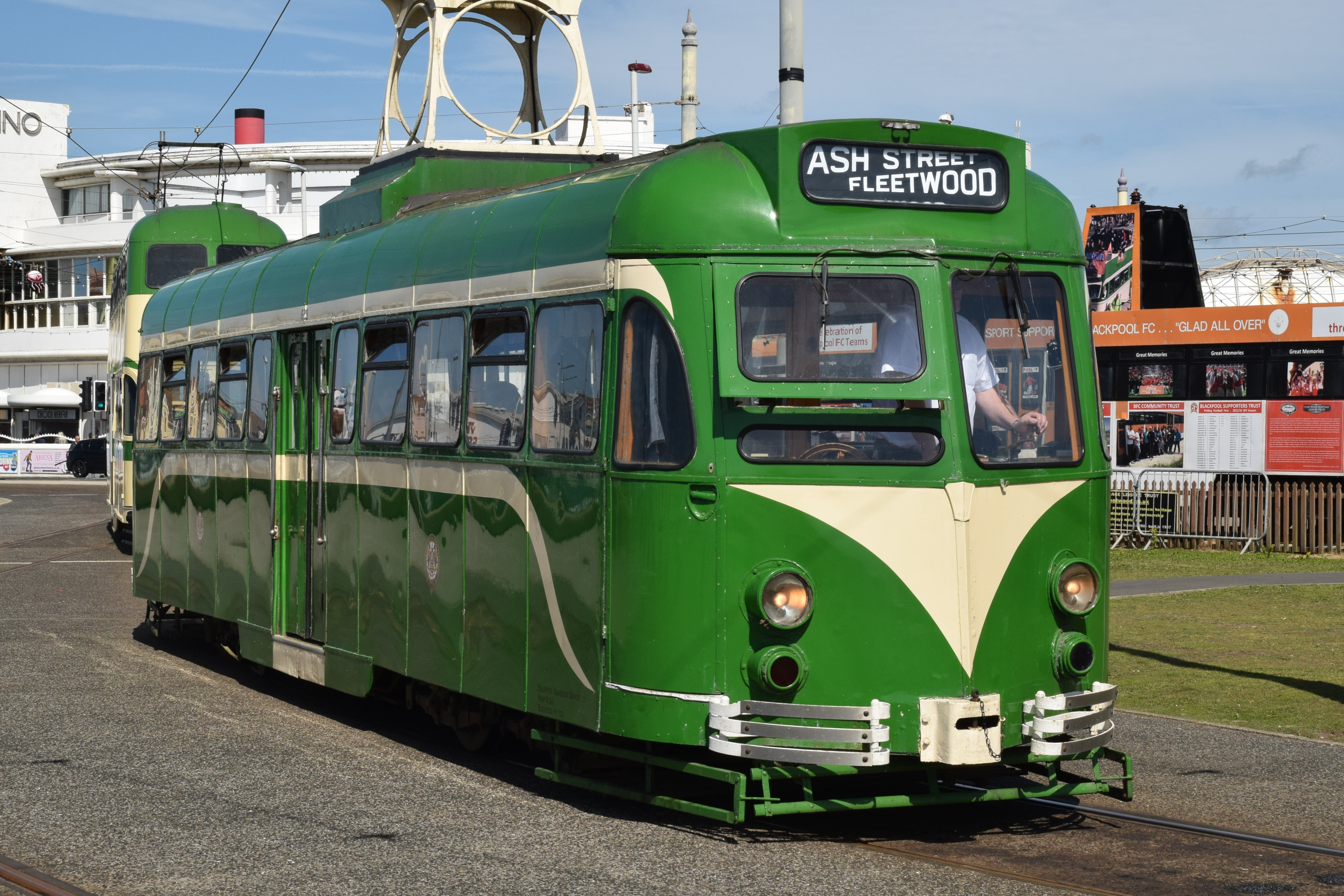
Brush Railcoach car No. 623

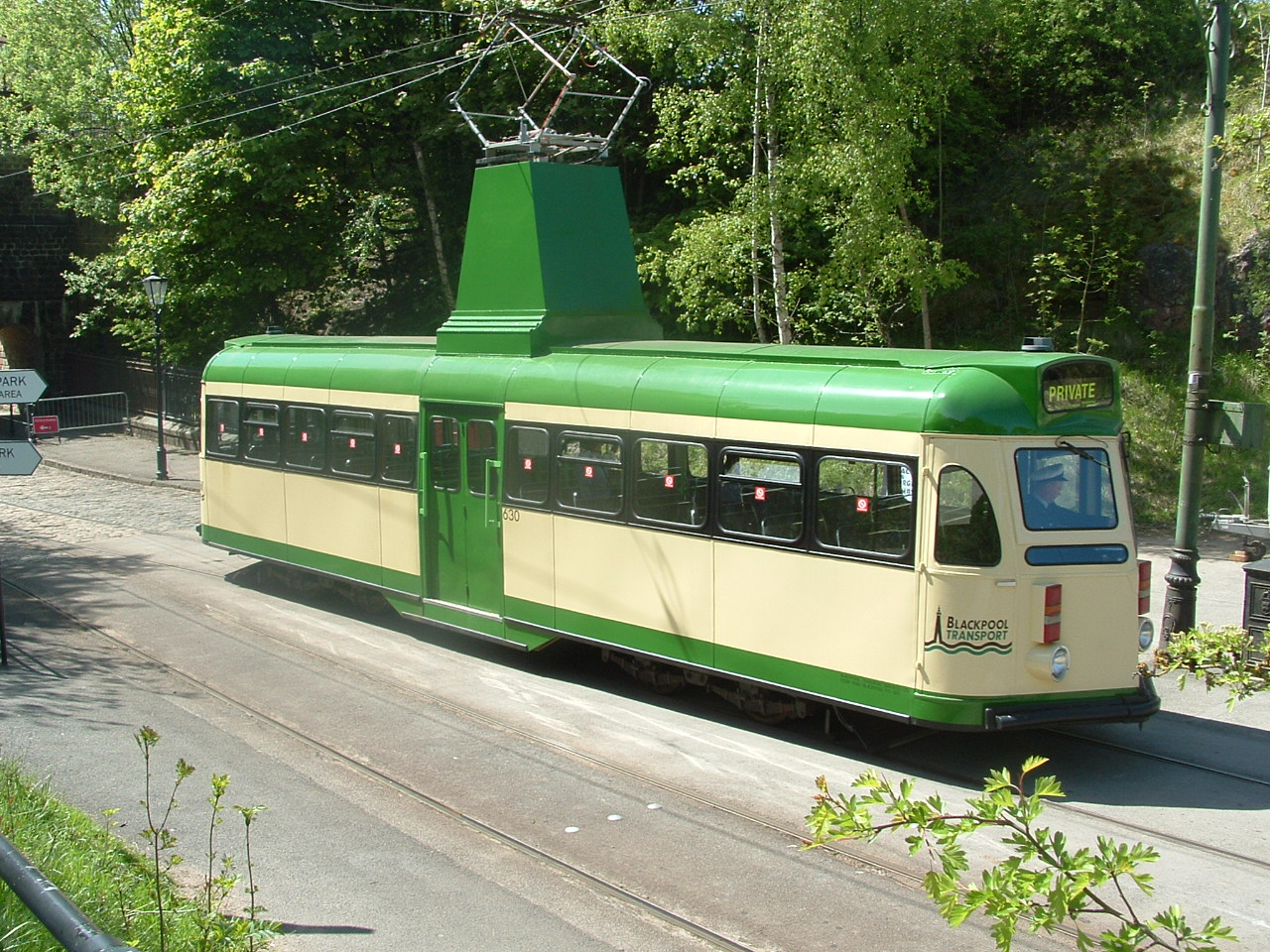
Brush Railcoach car No. 630 at the National Tramway Museum, Crich

The Brush Railcoach cars were 20 trams built by Brush in 1937. These are single-deck cars that closely resemble the original English Electric Railcoaches, but have more pointed ends. They were originally numbered 284–303, with eighteen survivors being renumbered 621–638 in 1968 (301 and 303 were scrapped without being renumbered). 638 was experimentally converted as a driver-only operated tram in 1969 with doors built at the ends for entry, but the experiment was deemed a failure due to the layout and seating capacity reduction, so it was converted back into a conventional Brush Railcoach. 638 was withdrawn from service in 1980 requiring an overhaul, but was scrapped in 1984 after being deemed surplus to requirements. 629 was withdrawn in 1972 requiring an overhaul, but was scrapped in 1980 due to Rigby Road workshops working throughout the 1970s on the OMO rebuild programme. 628 was withdrawn in 1969 due to a collision with Balloon car No. 726. The body of 628 was scrapped, but the underframe was converted into a rail carrying trailer with a rail crane installed. 628 was renumbered 751 and then 260. 633 was given an all-over advert for The Post Office in 1982, which featured a sales stand in one of the saloons where stamps and postcards could be bought and posted on board. The advert and sales stand were removed in 1984. 633 was later rebuilt as the illuminated Trawler in 2001 and renumbered 737 in 2008. One Brush car, 631, was retained by Blackpool Transport for the heritage fleet and was restored to its 1950s condition, but retained some features of its 1990s rebuild. 631 re-entered service in May 2013. On 6 August 2021, 631 was named Reginald Dixon MBE. 622 was given to Anchorsholme Primary School for use as a static classroom, but was eventually no longer required and was scrapped on site in December 2024. No. 626 was sold to Peel Holdings. No. 636 was sold to Stored Energy Technology to test experimental equipment. All of the other Brush Railcoach cars were acquired for preservation due to the modernisation of the tramway in 2011–2012.

In December 2013, former Permanent Way car 259 (originally 287, then 624, then Permanent Way car 748) and 632 which were preserved by the Fylde Transport Trust, returned to Rigby Road Depot from outside storage and await restoration before they can re-enter service as part of the heritage fleet. 621 was preserved at Beamish Museum until 2016 when it was donated to the heritage fleet in Blackpool and moved back there in December 2016. 621 returned to service in September 2017, repainted in 1950s green and cream livery. 623, painted in 1940s wartime green and cream livery, operates at Heaton Park Tramway in Manchester. In 2017, 623 went on loan to the Blackpool Tramway for the 80th anniversary of the Brush Railcoach cars. 290 (627) and 625 are preserved by the East Anglia Transport Museum. 630 operates at the National Tramway Museum in Crich. 630 was rebuilt in the 1990s with modern indicator headlamps, electrical equipment and bus-type seats and remains in this condition to represent its class in a heavily modernised version from this period of Blackpool's tramway history. 634 was privately sold and was on static display at the North Eastern Electrical Traction Trust museum painted in 1990s green and cream livery until 2016 when it was donated to the heritage fleet in Blackpool by its former owner and returned to Blackpool in February 2016 and was expected to re-enter service there repainted in a version of its former Coral Island Terror Train advert that the tram carried in the late 1990s. However, Blackpool Transport failed to complete the required work to return it to service and the tram left Blackpool for loan to the East Anglia Transport Museum in November 2023 and the tram re-entered service there in April 2024. 298 (635) was preserved by the National Tramway Museum in Crich where restoration began in 2020. 637 was privately preserved and was stored in Fleetwood where it was eventually scrapped in 2023.

=== Marton VAMBAC Railcoach cars ===
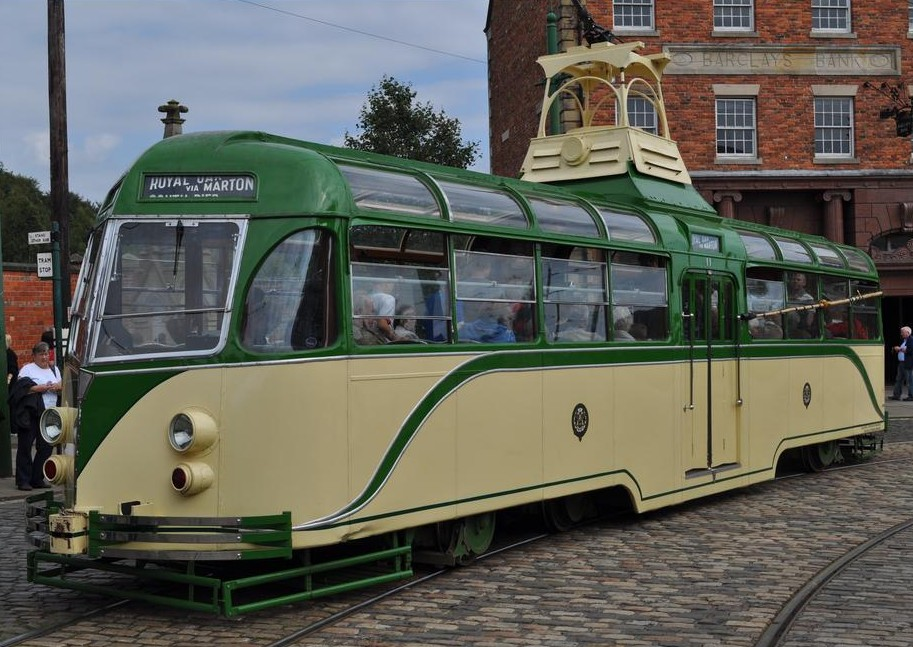
Tram No. 11 at Beamish Museum

The Marton VAMBAC Railcoach cars were 12 trams built in 1939 by English Electric. They were numbered 10–21. They were originally known as Sun Saloon Railcoach cars, but became known as the Marton VAMBAC Railcoach cars after their original equipment was replaced with VAMBAC (Variable Automatic Multinotch Braking and Acceleration Control) equipment to allow for smoother, faster and quieter acceleration and braking. They were also used exclusively on the Marton route of the tramway. Marton VAMBAC Railcoach car No. 11 is preserved by the East Anglia Transport Museum in Carlton Colville, Lowestoft.

=== Coronation cars ===
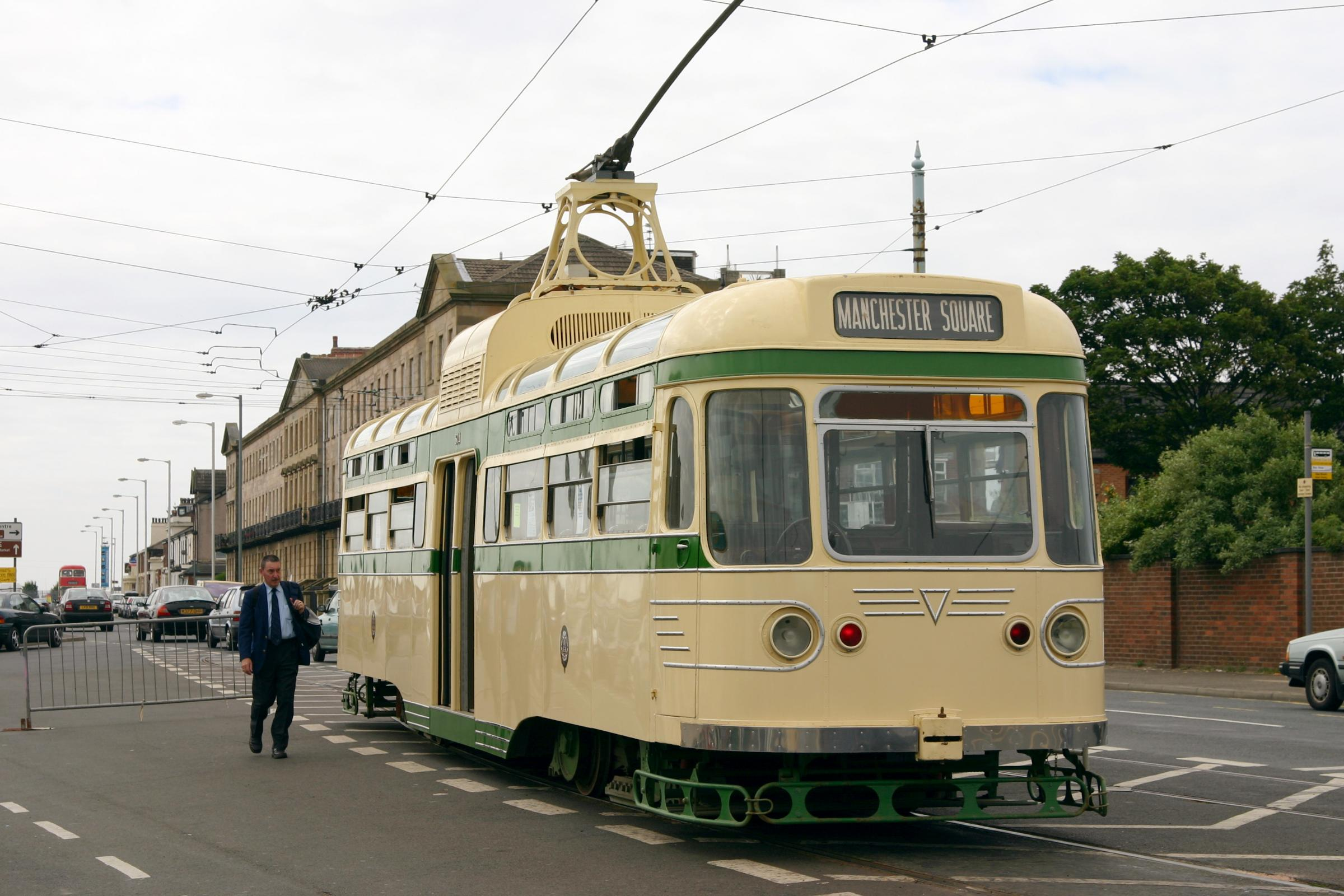
Coronation car No. 304 at Fleetwood

The Coronation cars, named because they were introduced in Queen Elizabeth II's Coronation Year, 1953, were 25 trams built between 1952 and 1953 by Charles Roberts & Company at Horbury Junction works, near Wakefield. They were numbered 304–328, until 1968 when twenty four of them were renumbered 641–664, with 313 having been withdrawn and scrapped without being renumbered. The sophisticated VAMBAC control system proved to be their Achilles' heel as it was unreliable. Thirteen trams had their VAMBAC systems replaced by conventional controllers from withdrawn tramcars during the 1960s, prolonging their short service life to 1975, when they were withdrawn. The unmodified examples were withdrawn from service in 1968. Twenty two of them were scrapped, leaving three examples left. No. 660 was retained for heritage purposes. Nos. 304 (later 641) and 663 were preserved by the Fylde Transport Trust (FTT). In 2013, Nos. 304 and 663 joined the heritage fleet.

Coronation 304, the first of the fleet, was bought for preservation and achieved celebrity status in 2002 when it was the subject of the seventh episode of the second series of the Channel 4 television programme Salvage Squad. It was returned to working order by Salvage Squad and FTT members and unveiled to the public on 6 January 2003 when it was filmed carrying out test runs along Blackpool Promenade.

=== Progress Twin Set cars ===
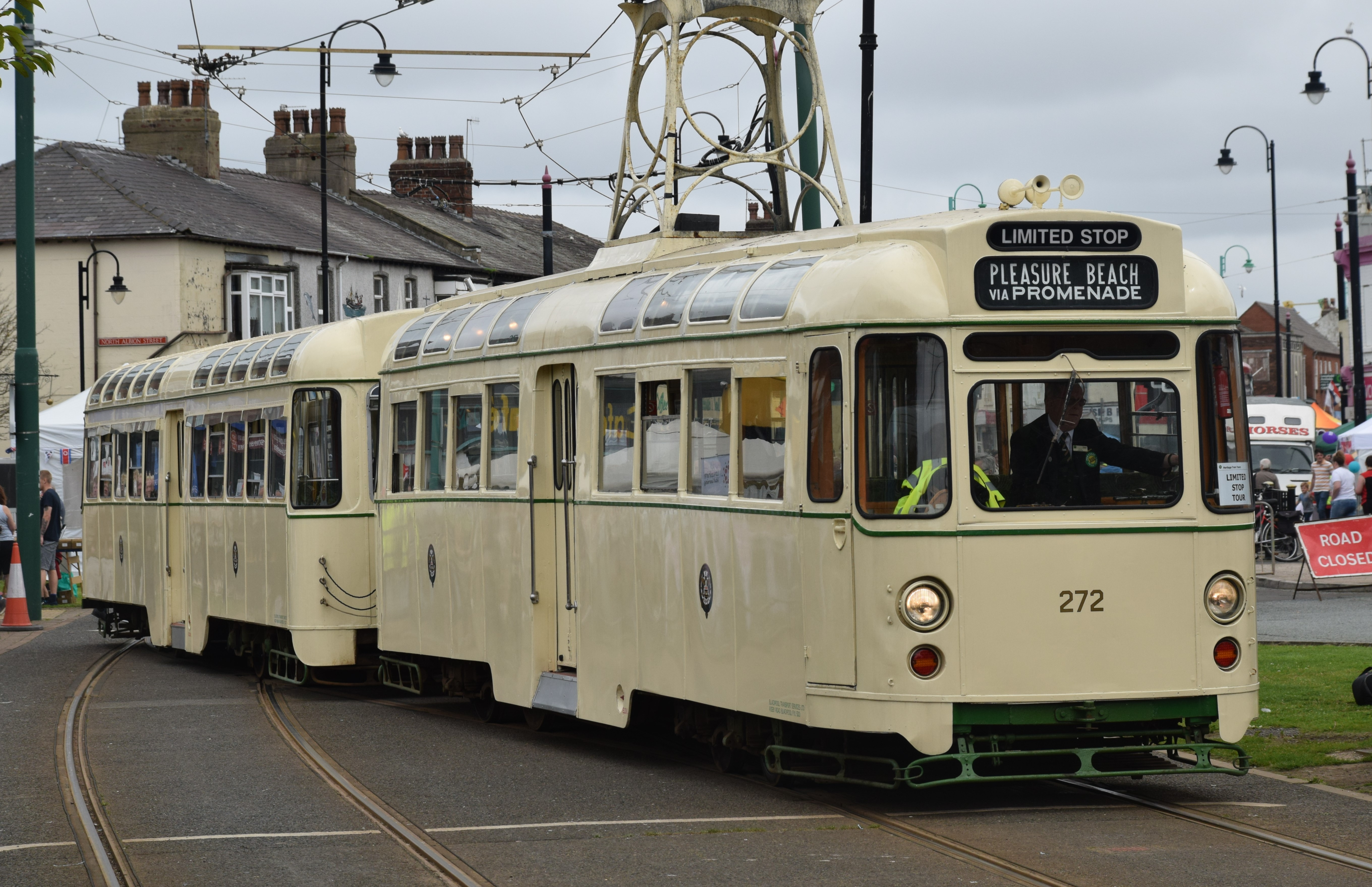
Twin Set cars Nos. 272+T2 at Fisherman's Walk, Fleetwood

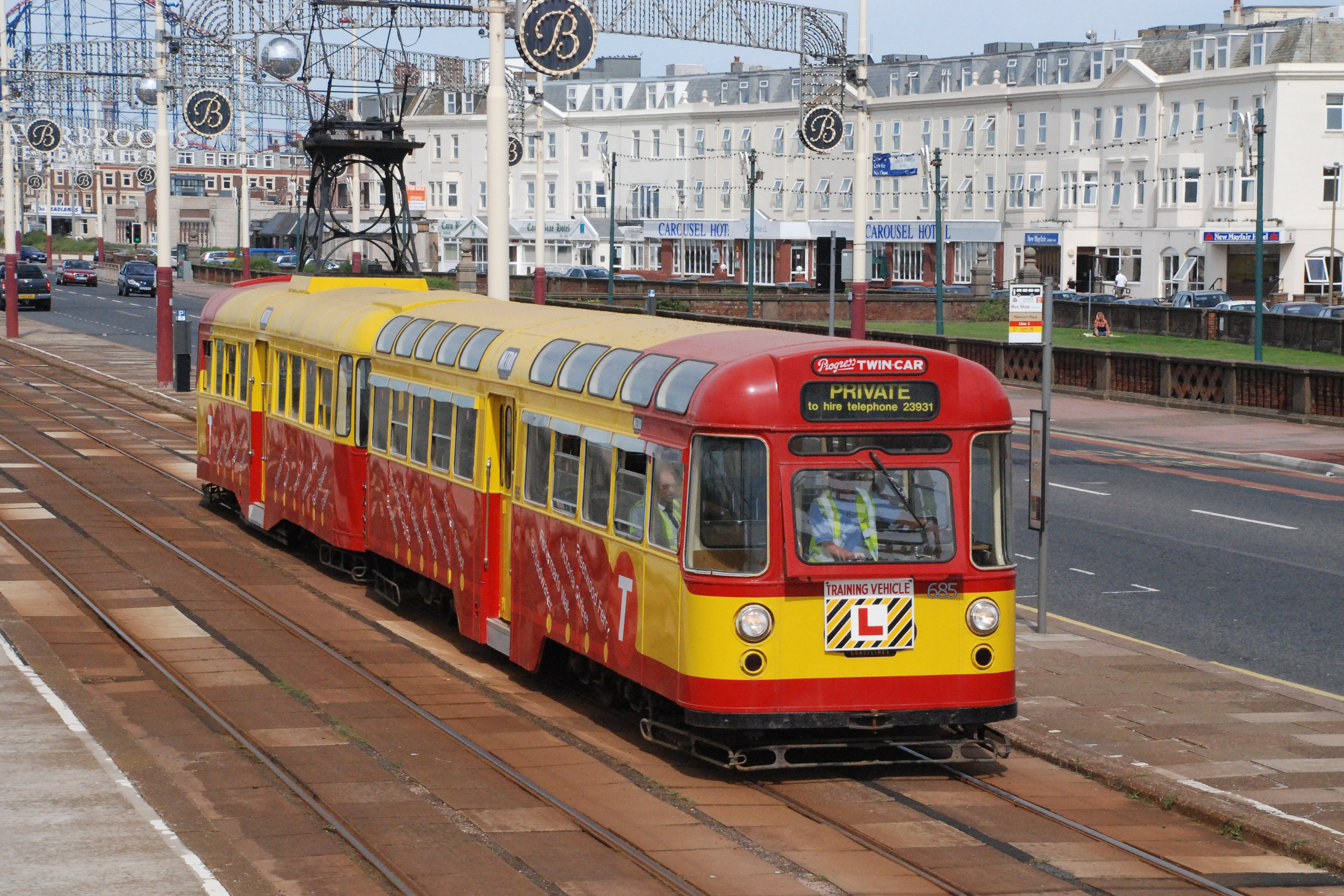
Twin Set cars Nos. 675+685 at Starr Gate in 2007

The Progress Twin Set cars were 20 single-deck towing and trailer cars made up from 10 towing cars numbered 272–281 and 10 trailer cars numbered T1–T10. English Electric Railcoach cars Nos. 275 and 276 were rebuilt in 1958 with flat ends and tested as the prototype Twin Set, with 276 towing 275 which had temporarily become a trailer. The ends of these cars were heavily redesigned to resemble the then contemporary Coronation cars. Deemed a success, English Electric Railcoach cars 272–274 and 277–281 were rebuilt as towing cars between 1958 and 1962, while 275 had its electrical equipment reinstalled. The 10 trailers were built brand new by Metro-Cammell in 1960, looking almost identical to the towing cars except for the lack of a tower. Initially, any towing car could tow any trailer, such as 272 and T9, until standardisation took place where each towing car towed the trailer with the corresponding last digit number, such as 273 and T3. The Twin Set cars were originally driven only from the towing end, until seven sets (281+T1 and 272+T2 to 277+T7) were later converted to be driven from either end with a cab in the trailers. In the 1968 tramway fleet renumbering programme, towing car 281 was renumbered 671, towing cars 272–280 became 672–680 and trailer cars T1–T10 became 681–690. Towing cars 678–680 operated singly after trailer cars 688–690 were withdrawn in 1972 and scrapped. In 2004, 676+686 and 677+687 were withdrawn, with 677 being scrapped in 2007 to provide parts for the Illuminated Western Train restoration.

With the Bombardier Flexity 2 tramcars operating the main day to day services from 2012, the Twin Set cars were withdrawn at the end of 2011. 671 was preserved by the Fylde Transport Trust and has been loaned to the North West Museum of Road Transport since 2021, where it has been repainted into the original 1960s cream livery and has returned to its original pre-1968 number of 281. 681 is owned by Blackpool Transport and is stored. In 2012, 672+682 were reactivated and renumbered back to their original numbers as 272 and T2 and were repainted into the 1960s cream livery. In September 2016, No. 272 suffered fire damage whilst in service near Gynn Square due to an electrical fault and this set is currently stored out of service awaiting repair. 673+683 were preserved by the Fleetwood Heritage Leisure Trust. 674+684 were preserved by the North Eastern Electrical Traction Trust. In September 2015, 675+685 were reactivated and repainted into 1970s green and cream with an orange pantograph tower for 675. 676+686 joined the heritage fleet and this set is currently stored. No. 687 was acquired by Rossall School.

=== OMO cars ===
OMO car No. 5

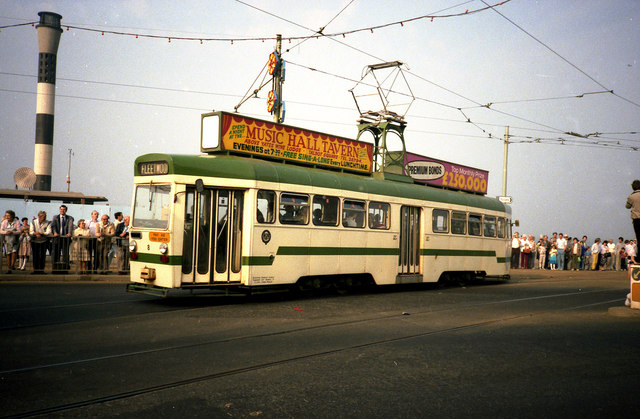
OMO car No. 8 in 1985

The One-Man Operated (OMO) cars were 13 trams numbered 1–13. Between 1972 and 1976, the 11 remaining English Electric Railcoaches in their original form, Nos. 608–610, 612–617 and 619–620, as well as No. 611 with flat cab-ends and No. 618 with tapered cab-ends, were rebuilt with extended platforms tapered at each end so passengers could enter at the front and pay the driver, whilst the original central doors became used by passengers only to exit the tramcars. This meant the trams could run with a crew of only one, reducing costs and possibly saving the tramway from closure. No. 616 was the first to be rebuilt as an OMO car in 1972, becoming No. 1. It was followed in the same year by No. 620 as No. 2, No. 610 as No. 3, No. 608 as No. 4 and No. 609 as No. 5. In 1973, No. 617 became No. 6 and No. 619 became No. 7. In 1974, No. 612 became No. 8, No. 613 became No. 9 and No. 614 became No. 10. In 1975, No. 615 became No. 11 and No. 611 with the flat cab-ends became No. 12. In 1976, No. 618 already with the tapered cab-ends but without the doors at the ends prior to rebuilding as an OMO car, became No. 13.

They ran the main year-round service until they were replaced by the Centenary class trams in the 1980s. No. 13 was the first to be withdrawn in 1984, whilst the last OMO cars in service, Nos. 5, 10 and 11, were withdrawn in 1993. After withdrawal, No. 10 was sold and became a coffee shop at a conference centre in Reading in 1996, but was scrapped in 2005. No. 11 was used as a test car to trial experimental equipment and was scrapped in 2000. Three of the OMO cars were preserved: No. 5 is stored at the National Tramway Museum's off-site facility awaiting restoration, No. 8 last carried passengers in 2010 but is currently stored in Blackpool awaiting further overhaul work and No. 7 was rebuilt as a replica Vanguard tram in 1987, renumbered back to 619 and is at the Heaton Park Tramway in Manchester.

=== Jubilee cars ===
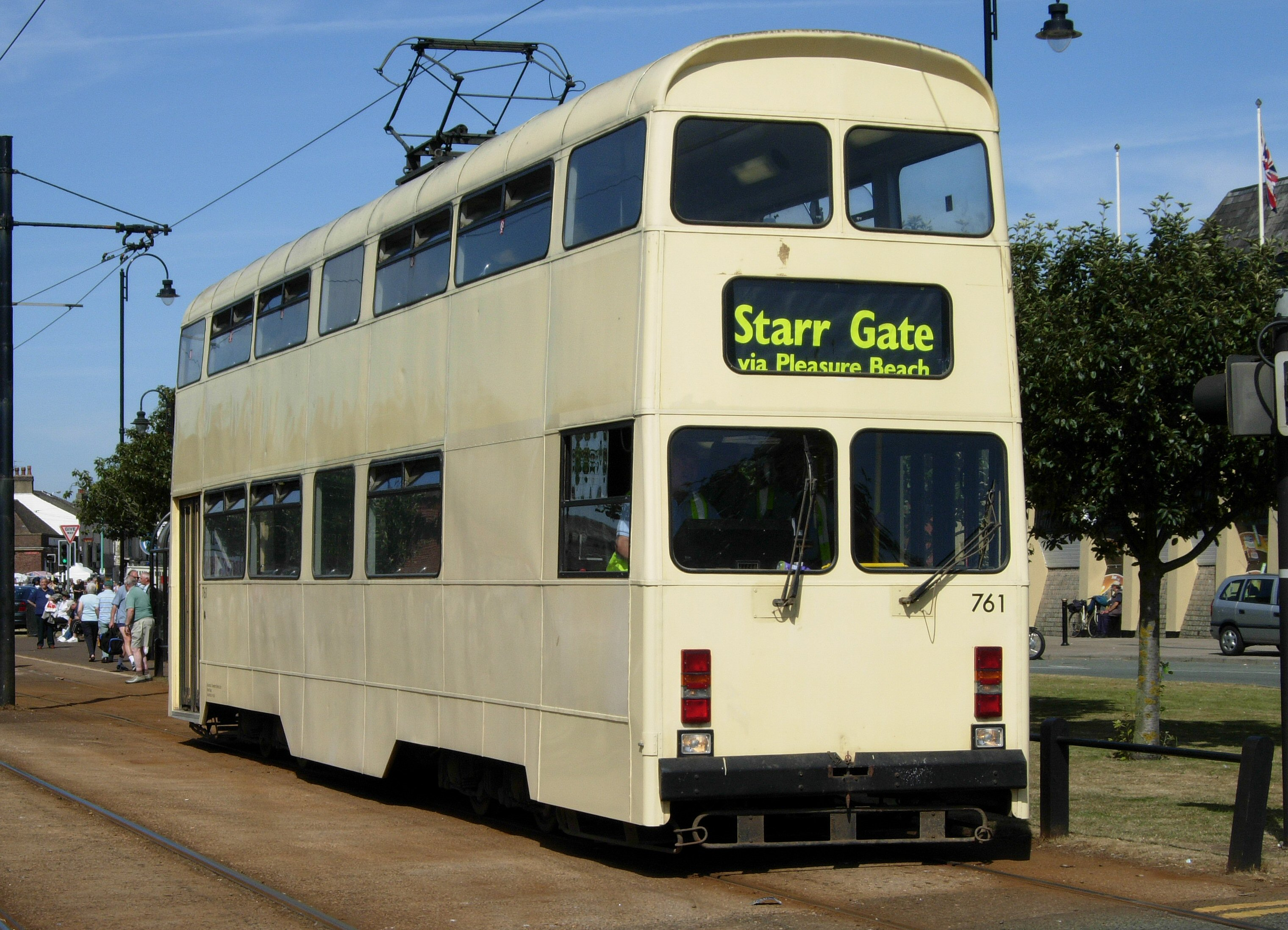
Jubilee car No. 761 at Ash Street, Fleetwood in 2006

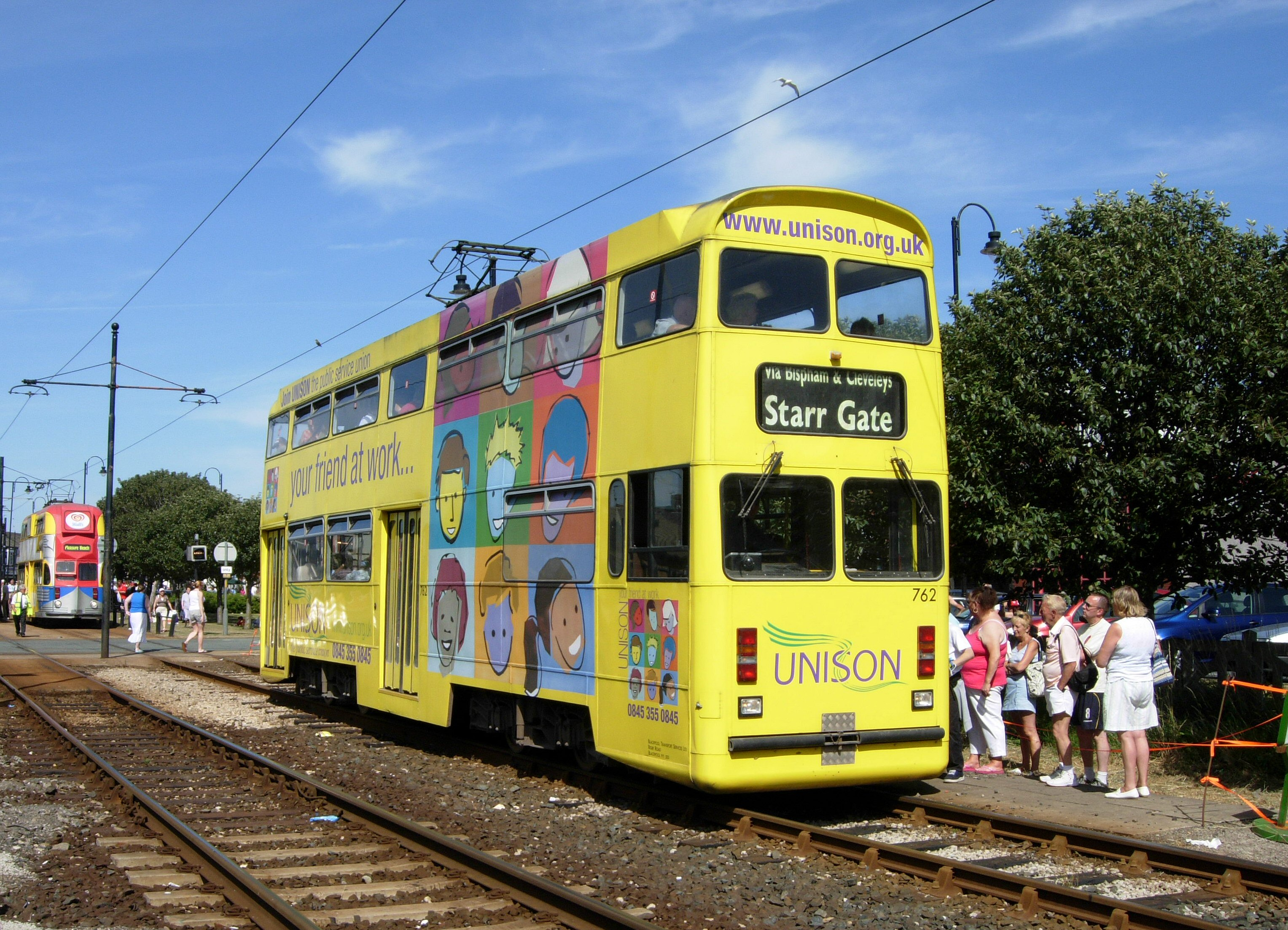
Jubilee car No. 762 at Ash Street, Fleetwood in 2006

The Jubilee cars, named because they were introduced shortly after the Silver Jubilee of Elizabeth II in 1977, were two trams numbered 761 and 762. In the late 1970s, Blackpool Transport, having completed its OMO rebuild programme, was still left with a significant surplus of cash. Using redundant Balloon car 725, BT set to work on creating an experimental double-deck OMO car. It was completed in 1979; unlike the OMOs it did not have centre doors and had a much more bus-like appearance. It was thought a success, so a second was created using redundant Balloon car 714, which unlike the first, retained its centre doors and was completed in 1982. They were renumbered 761 and 762 respectively. Although a success and big crowd-movers, no more were built either brand new or rebuilt from the Balloon cars. They carried on in service until the modernisation of the tramway in 2011–2012. Both cars are preserved; 761 by the Blackpool Heritage Trust and 762 by the National Tramway Museum in Crich. After a long period of refurbishment, 762 carried out test runs at the museum and re-entered service in September 2014. 761, meanwhile, was preserved by the Fleetwood Heritage Leisure Trust and was in outside storage until December 2013 when it was moved back in to Blackpool Transport's Rigby Road Depot. In May 2017, 761 was transferred from the Fleetwood Heritage Leisure Trust to Blackpool Heritage Trust. Both cars carried many colourful advertising liveries throughout their lives and both still carry one in preservation; 762 carries a bright scheme advertising an attraction at Blackpool's Pleasure Beach theme park.

=== Centenary cars ===
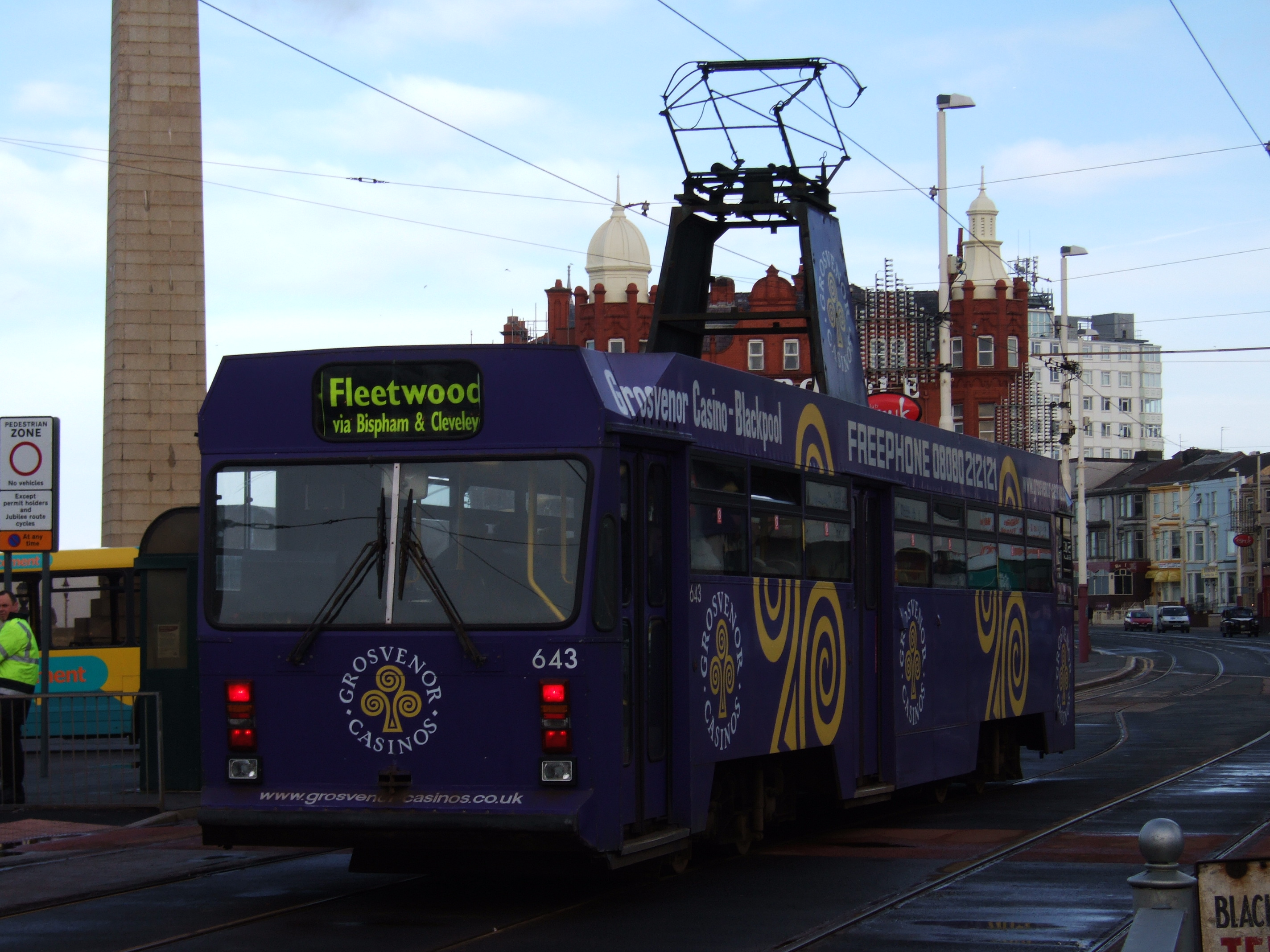
Centenary car No. 643 at North Pier

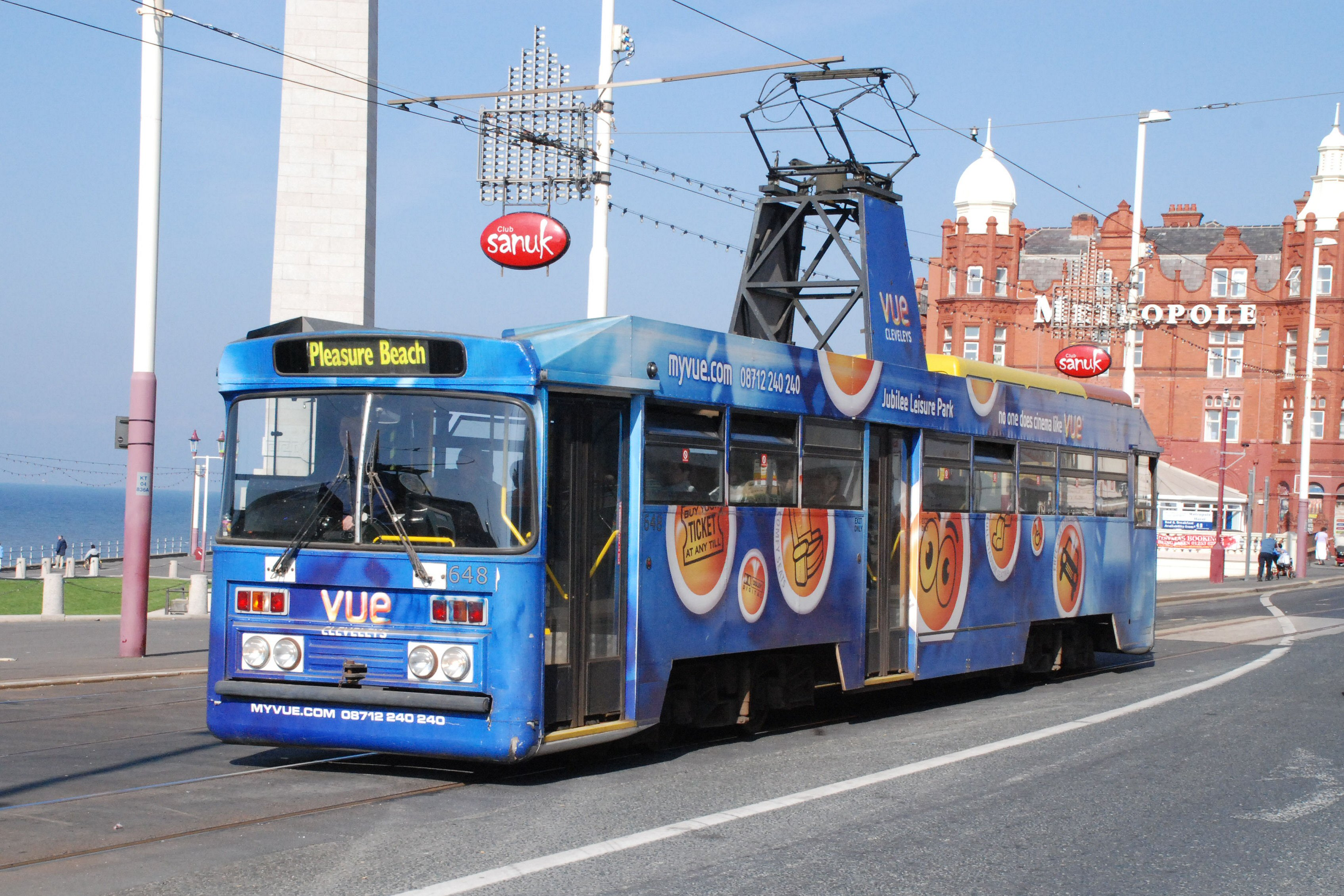
Centenary car No. 648 at North Pier in 2008

The Centenary cars were 8 single-deck, one-man operated trams numbered 641–648 (648 originally being numbered 651), with flat ends and a revised door layout, giving them a more bus-like appearance compared to previous tramcar designs. They have a capacity of 52 passengers (of which 16 are standing). The position of the doors means that they can be operated by just a driver, as opposed to having a crew of two or three on board. This was useful during low season and early morning/late night services when there was little demand, as it allowed the network to keep labour costs down.

They were built by East Lancashire Coachbuilders from 1984 to 1988. The first two cars (641 and GEC Traction test bed 651, later rebuilt into conventional Centenary 648) were completed ahead of the tramway's centenary year, hence their name. Originally intended to replace the OMO cars which were suffering from metal fatigue, ten were ordered. However, due to cost cutting only seven were built for Blackpool Transport, with GEC's 651 later joining the fleet as 648. The cost cutting continued, as although the bodies, chassis and bogies were new, the motors and wheelsets were pre-war, refurbished ones from withdrawn cars. The bogie design continued the theme of the "O.M.O." and London Transport Underground cars, having "Metalastik" rubber/metal bonded springs. No. 641 was built with a unique roof advert box. Between 1998 and 2006, a mid-life overhaul programme was carried out on all the Centenary cars, altering their appearances with alternate designs. No. 648 however was overhauled with its original shape left intact. A feature of the Centenary trams after rebuilding from the overhaul programme was the roof sides which were rebuilt to appear flush with the body sides, which provided more space for advertising.

With the introduction of the new Bombardier Flexity 2 trams in 2012, all eight Centenary cars were withdrawn. Two of these trams are used on heritage tours: Nos. 642 and 648, the latter of which has been restored back to its original appearance. This is not strictly accurate, as 648 was numbered 651 when originally delivered. Also the work was done on a tight budget meaning some of the modern features had to be retained. The retained Centenaries unfortunately suffer from electrical issues, with 642 failing on the first day of its re-entry into service, although it has operated successfully since. 641 was preserved by the Fleetwood Heritage Leisure Trust in 2011, but was scrapped in 2023. 643 is used as a classroom at Brooke School in Rugby. 644 is stored at Farmer Parrs Animal World in Fleetwood. 645 was stored at Windy Harbour Holiday Park in Singleton near Blackpool, but returned to Rigby Road depot to join the heritage fleet in 2017. In 2023, 645 was preserved by the National Tramway Museum in Crich. After initially being preserved by the Fleetwood Heritage Leisure Trust, 646 was scrapped in October 2012 due to vandalism. 647, the last traditional standard gauge passenger tram built in Great Britain, is owned by the North Eastern Electrical Traction Trust, based at the North East Land, Sea and Air Museum. The all over advert on 647 was stripped off and it is intended that it will be repainted into a fictional 1920s style red, teak and white livery.

=== Illuminated cars ===
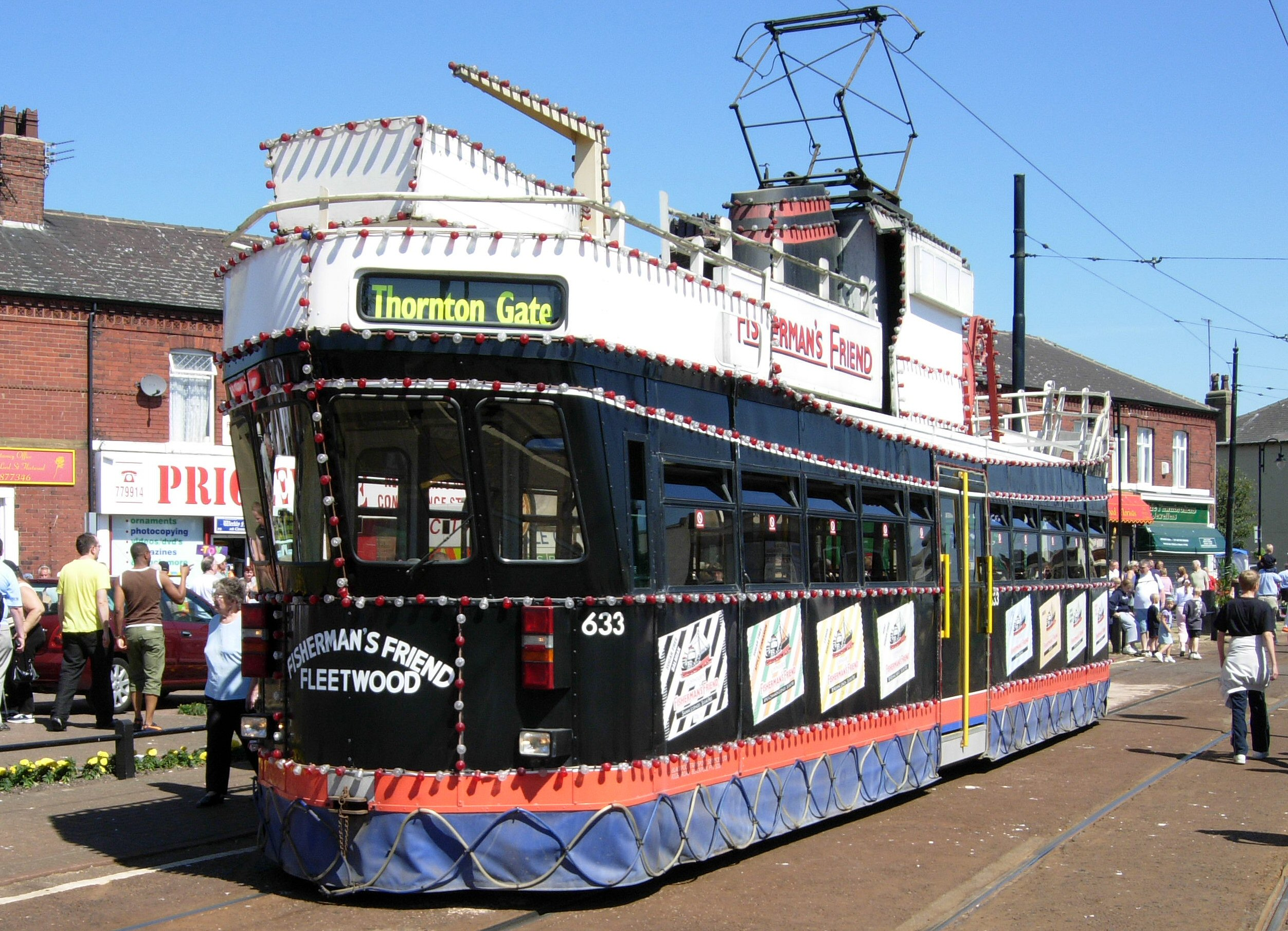
Illuminated Trawler No. 633 at Ash Street, Fleetwood in 2006

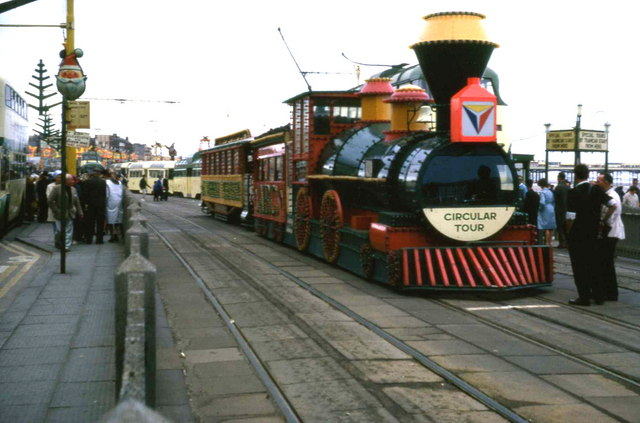
Illuminated Western Train Nos. 733+734

A variety of tramcars of different designs were rebuilt as illuminated theme cars. They mainly run along the illuminated part of the promenade, from Starr Gate to Bispham, during the Illuminations. There was originally no numbering series until 1968 when the remaining trams in the fleet were numbered 731–736. The illuminated trams have carried a variety of adverts since the 1960s.

The Venetian Gondola, the first illuminated theme car, was rebuilt from Marton Box car 28 in 1925 and was scrapped in 1963. The Lifeboat, rebuilt from Marton Box car 40 in 1926, was scrapped in 1962. The Cottage tram, rebuilt from Marton Box car 33 in 1933, was scrapped in April 1935. The Bandwagon/ Progress tram, rebuilt from Blackpool and Fleetwood Crossbench Rack tram 141 (originally No. 27) in 1937, was given a further rebuild in 1949 and was scrapped in November 1959.

The Blackpool Belle (731), rebuilt from Toastrack car 163 in 1959, was preserved in the United States in 1982 by the Oregon Electric Railway Museum after being withdrawn in Blackpool in 1978. After being fitted with a propane-fuelled on-board generator, it entered service on the Willamette Shore Trolley line (which lacks overhead wiring), in Portland in 1992. It ran occasionally until 1994 and was then placed in store. Later, it was sold to a research facility in Texas, United States, who used it to test alternative power sources and after completing this role, the car's body was scrapped, with only the underframe left intact.

The Rocket (732) was rebuilt from Pantograph car 168 in 1961. The Western Train Locomotive (733) was rebuilt from English Electric Railcoach car 209 in 1962 and the Western Train Carriage (734) was rebuilt from Pantograph car 174 in 1962. The Locomotive and Carriage were paired together to form the Western Train (733+734). The Hovertram (735) was rebuilt from English Electric Railcoach car 222 in 1963. The Frigate (736) was rebuilt from Pantograph car 170 in 1965 and was further rebuilt with an altered shape at the back and on top of the roof in 2004. The Trawler (633) was rebuilt from Brush Railcoach car 633 in 2001 and was renumbered 737 in 2008.

A campaign by the local newspaper, the Blackpool Gazette in 2006 to get The Western Train back on track, resulted in a £278,000 Heritage Lottery Fund grant to restore the two tramcars in the Western Train set which first ran in 1962. They had been withdrawn in 1999 and stood derelict at Rigby Road depot. The tramcars returned to service during the 2009 Illuminations Switch-On. In January 2008 it was revealed that another iconic illuminated tram, the Rocket, which had been in service between 1961 and 1999 but which had since then stood idle, was also due to be restored for the Illuminations in 2012 at a cost of about £150,000 and with the help of a newly created Friends of the Illuminations group. The full restoration did not occur but it was cosmetically restored in 2012 and used as a static display as part of the Illuminations for 2012 and 2013.

With the introduction of the Flexity 2 trams in 2012, the Western Train (733+734), the Frigate (736) and the Trawler (737) were retained as part of the heritage fleet. In 2014, the Rocket (732) joined the heritage fleet from the Fylde Transport Trust. In September 2016, the Hovertram (735) returned to Blackpool initially on loan, but its owners, the North Eastern Electrical Traction Trust, offered Blackpool Heritage Trust the opportunity to purchase it. The Hovertram was purchased in 2017 and joined the heritage collection in Blackpool.

== Current fleet ==
In December 2024, the Heritage Fleet was suspended temporarily, with Blackpool Transport Services citing "issues such as depot space, tram movements, general safety and maintenance conflicts making it difficult to continue running the service effectively".

The fleet of heritage trams are used most weekends throughout the year; at any one time, some are operational and some are awaiting overhaul, repair or restoration.

The list of the fleet as of 5 October 2024 is as follows:

Class	Image	Fleet Number	Built	Livery	Status
OMO		8	1974	Plum and Custard	Awaiting overhaul
Lytham St. Annes Corporation Tramways open balcony double-decker		43	1924	Blue and White	Awaiting restoration
Bolton Corporation Tramways double-decker		66	1901	Maroon and Cream	Operational
Standard		143	1924	Red, Teak and Cream	Stored
Standard		147	1924	Green and Cream	Awaiting overhaul
Boat		227	1934	Red and Cream	Operational
Boat		230	1934	Green and Cream	Awaiting overhaul
Brush Railcoach		259	1937	Works Green	Awaiting restoration
Twin Set		272+T2	1960	Cream	Awaiting overhaul
English Electric Railcoach		279	1935	N/A	Undergoing overhaul
Coronation		304	1952	Green and Cream	Undergoing overhaul
Boat		600	1934	Green and Cream	Operational
Brush Railcoach		621	1937	Green and Cream	Stored
Brush Railcoach		631	1937	Green and Cream	Operational
Brush Railcoach		632	1937	Green and Cream	Awaiting overhaul
Brush Railcoach		634	1937	"Terror Tram" themed advert	Operational, on loan to East Anglia Transport Museum
Centenary		642	1986	Yellow, Green and Cream with Heritage Tram adverts	Awaiting overhaul
Centenary		648	1985	Green and Cream	Stored
Coronation		660	1953	Green and Cream	Awaiting overhaul
Coronation		663	1953	Green and Cream	Awaiting overhaul
Twin Set		675+685	1958	Green and Cream	Awaiting overhaul
Twin Set		676+686	1958	Green and Cream	Awaiting restoration
Ex Towing English Electric Railcoach		680	1960	Green and Cream	Stored, on loan from Heaton Park Tramway
Twin car Trailer		681	1960	Green and Yellow	Awaiting restoration
Balloon		701	1934	Red and White	Awaiting overhaul
Balloon		703	1934	Red and Cream	Awaiting overhaul
Balloon		704	1934	N/A	Undergoing overhaul, privately owned
Balloon open-topper		706	1934	Green and Cream	Awaiting overhaul
Balloon		710	1934	Fuchsia and Yellow	Awaiting restoration
Balloon		715	1934	Green and Cream	Awaiting overhaul
Balloon		717	1934	Green and Cream	Operational
Balloon		723	1935	Green and Cream	Operational
Illuminated Rocket		732	1961	White and Green	Awaiting restoration
Illuminated Western Train		733+734	1962	Red, Green and Yellow	Operational
Illuminated Hovertram		735	1963	White and Black	Awaiting restoration
Illuminated Frigate		736	1965	White	Operational
Illuminated Trawler		737	2001	Blue, Red, Black and White	Stored
Jubilee		761	1979	Advert for Wynsors World of Shoes	Awaiting restoration
Glasgow Corporation Tramways open-topper		1016	1904	N/A	Awaiting restoration

== Historic ancillary vehicles ==
Alongside the passenger fleet, there have been various trams in use on the Blackpool Tramway carrying out various roles as works cars, including inspection and repairing of the overhead wires and towing failed trams back to the depots. There have also been various wagons and battery powered vehicles used on the tramway, including: Blackpool and Fleetwood Tramroad Tower Wagon No. 749 from 1907, preserved by Beamish Museum, Reel Wagon No. 750 from 1907 and the Crab from 2012, which is a battery powered vehicle used to shunt the Flexity 2 trams at Starr Gate Depot (its full identity being Crab 1500 E).

Several passenger trams of various classes which had been withdrawn from service were reused as works cars. This includes: No. 2 (formerly Marton Box No. 33 from 1920 to 1928), No. 3 (formerly Fleetwood Crossbench No. 126, earlier No. 1 from 1939 to 1951), Conduit car No. 4 from 1912 to 1934, Conduit cars 5 and 6, No. 5 (formerly Fleetwood Box No. 114, earlier No. 40 from 1936 to 1960), No. 5 (formerly English Electric Railcoach No. 609, earlier No. 221 from 1965 to 1971 – rebuilt as OMO No. 5 in 1972), No. 6 (formerly Fleetwood Crossbench No. 132, earlier No. 7 from 1939 to 1955), No. 7 (formerly Toastrack No. 161 from 1942 to 1958), No. 15 (formerly Toastrack No. 165 from 1951 to 1968), Fleetwood Box car No. 112 (originally No. 38) from 1936, Fleetwood Crossbench cars 127 (originally No. 2) and 128 (originally No. 3) from 1938, Fleetwood Crossbench car No. 129 (originally No. 4) from 1938 to 1939, Fleetwood Crossbench car No. 133 (originally No. 8) from 1938 to 1942, Fleetwood Crossbench car No. 135 (originally No. 10) from 1937 to 1939, Fleetwood Crossbench car No. 137 (originally No. 12) from 1937 to 1942, Fleetwood Crossbench car No. 139 (originally No. 25) from 1924, Pantograph car No. 167 from 1954 to 1962, Pantograph car No. 170 from 1962 to 1965 – rebuilt as Illuminated Frigate No. 736 in 1965, Brush Railcoach No. 259 (originally No. 287, then No. 624, then No. 748) from 1971 to 2002, Rail Crane No. 260 (originally Brush Railcoach No. 291, then No. 628, then Rail Crane No. 751) from 1973, No. 753 (formerly No. 3, earlier Standard No. 143) from 1957 to 1990, No. 754 (formerly No. 4, earlier Marton Box No. 31) from 1934 to 1984 and No. 757 (formerly No. 17, earlier Toastrack No. 166 from 1953 to 1971). Fleetwood Crossbench car No. 2, Conduit car No. 4, OMO car No. 5, Marton Box car No. 31, Fleetwood Box car No. 40, Standard car No. 143, Toastrack car No. 166, Pantograph car No. 167, Brush Railcoach car No. 259 and the Illuminated Frigate No. 736 were preserved. The Rail Crane No. 260 has been withdrawn and is stored at Rigby Road Depot. All of the other passenger trams which were reused as works cars were scrapped.

The electric works locomotive was built in 1927 by English Electric to a steeplecab design, for use in hauling coal wagons from a railway siding behind Copse Road Depot in Fleetwood to Thornton Gate sidings. The locomotive did not receive a fleet number in the Blackpool tramcar fleet, but it is known by its works number as 717. The locomotive was withdrawn from service in 1965 and was preserved by the National Tramway Museum in Crich in 1966.

In 1928, the Railgrinder No. 1 was built for use in carrying various items around the various depots, as well as for rail grinding and clearing snow with a snowplough. A second railgrinder tram, No. 2 was built in 1935 for the same roles. However, No. 2 was withdrawn in 1965 due to the Blackpool Tramway contracting in the 1960s and it was preserved by the National Tramway Museum in Crich. In 1968, No. 1 was renumbered No. 2 and in 1972 it was renumbered 752. By 2002, No. 752 had been withdrawn and was preserved by the Heaton Park Tramway in 2008, returning to its original number in 2014.

In 1982, Blackpool Corporation Transport acquired a Unimog road-rail vehicle built by Mercedes-Benz, numbered 440. A second road-rail vehicle was acquired in 1988 by Blackpool Transport, who had succeeded Blackpool Corporation Transport in 1986. The second road-rail vehicle was built by Bedford/ Bruff and numbered 441. In 1996, No. 440 became No. 940 and No. 441 became No. 941. In 2002, a third road-rail vehicle built by Mercedes-Benz was acquired and numbered 939. In 2006, a fourth road-rail vehicle built by Brecknell Willis was acquired and numbered 938. No. 940 was scrapped in 2005 whilst No. 941 was scrapped in 2007.

In 1992, Engineering tram 754 was built by East Lancashire Coachbuilders for a variety of uses on the tramway. As well as having two trolley poles, one fitted at each end, it was fitted with a diesel generator which allows it to operate on the tramway whenever the electricity supply is turned off. It also has an inspection tower for inspecting the overhead wires.

== Trams from other operators and organisations ==
In addition to the various Blackpool Tramway fleet trams that have operated in Blackpool, trams representing other tramways have been added to the fleet, used on loan or stored for other organisations over many years.

The first tram to visit Blackpool was Southampton 45 in 1949, which was stored inside Marton Depot for its owners, the Light Rail Transport League whilst the group attempted to find a permanent home in preservation for it. Ownership of Southampton 45 transferred to the National Tramway Museum in Crich during its stay in Blackpool, and the tram left in 1958 for its new home in Crich.

In preparation for the 100th anniversary of the Blackpool Tramway in 1985, several trams were loaned to Blackpool, including: Bolton 66 (1981 onwards), Edinburgh 35 (1983–1988), Sheffield 513 (1984–1985, 2001–2011), Glasgow 1297 (1984–1986), Hill of Howth 10 (1985–1989), New South Wales, Australia steam tram 47 John Bull (1985) and Manchester 765 (1985–1988, 2010–2011). Some of these trams would return to Blackpool for further loan periods. Bolton 66, owned by the Bolton 66 Tramcar Trust, became the first tram outside of the Blackpool tram fleet to operate in passenger service in Blackpool and it joined the heritage fleet in 2012. New South Wales 47 became the first steam tram to operate in Blackpool.

Before Wirral Tramway opened 1995 as a heritage tramway, two trams were built in Hong Kong in 1992 for use on that tramway to provide an initial service. The two trams became Birkenhead 69 and 70, following on from the original sixty-eight Birkenhead electric trams. As the Wirral Tramway did not open until 1995, they were loaned to Blackpool for testing and operated in passenger service, with Birkenhead 70 becoming the first foreign-built tram to operate in Blackpool in 1993. Birkenhead 70 left Blackpool in 1994 to operate on the Wirral Tramway, followed by Birkenhead 69 in 1995.

Stockport 5 was loaned to Blackpool for passenger service between 1996 and 2011. Glasgow 1245 arrived in Blackpool in 1998 from the East Anglia Transport Museum, with intentions for it to be restored and join the Blackpool Tramway fleet. However, these intentions did not happen and Glasgow 1245 left Blackpool in 2002 to join the Summerlee Museum collection of trams.

In 1997, a tram built by Tram Power arrived in Blackpool for testing purposes and it became the first articulated tram in Blackpool. This articulated tram was originally known as the Roadliner, but was rebranded as the City Class tram. The City Class tram was given the number 611 in the Blackpool tramcar fleet, which had last been used by English Electric Railcoach No. 611 prior to being rebuilt as OMO car No. 12. City Class tram 611 departed Blackpool in 2000 after testing, so that modifications could be made prior to a second visit for further testing and it returned in 2005. In January 2007, No. 611 caught fire whilst being tested, causing extensive damage. No. 611 left Blackpool in the same year and has since been rebuilt. No. 611 returned to Blackpool in 2018, now in a silver livery, for storage purposes only, with plans for it to eventually operate on a test tramway in Preston.

In 2010, Oporto, Portugal 273 and Liverpool 762 were loaned to Blackpool for the 125th anniversary of the Blackpool Tramway, with both trams leaving Blackpool in the same year after the celebrations. In 2011, Cardiff water car 131 arrived in Blackpool for use in scrubbing and preparing the newly laid track on New South Promenade for the start of testing of the Flexity 2 trams. Cardiff 131 left Blackpool in 2012.

In 2016, the partially restored Lytham St. Annes 43 arrived in Blackpool, on a long-term loan from its owner, where it will eventually be fully restored for use in passenger service. The remnants of Glasgow 1016 also arrived in Blackpool in 2016, having been acquired by the Blackpool Heritage Trust and it will be restored to original open top double-deck condition as Paisley 16 or Glasgow 1016. In 2017, Birkenhead 20 was loaned to Blackpool and only operated in service on five separate occasions before returning to Birkenhead in 2018.

In 2018, Halle 902 was loaned to Blackpool for storage purposes only to free up additional space at the National Tramway Museum and left in 2022.

== See also ==
- Blackpool Tramway
- List of Blackpool Tramway tram stops
