= War Memorial, Lancaster Cemetery =

Crimean War memorial in Lancashire, England

Coordinates: 54.05117°N 2.77759°W

The War Memorial, Lancaster Cemetery, was built to commemorate those lost in the Crimean War. It was erected in 1860, and designed by the local architect E. G. Paley. Its estimated cost was £120–140, but Paley made no charge for it. The monument is constructed in carboniferous limestone and consists of an obelisk on three steps. Its inscriptions include the names of the local men who died in the war. The obelisk stands 34 feet (10 m) high. The monument is recorded in the National Heritage List for England as a designated Grade II listed building.

== See also ==
- Listed buildings in Lancaster, Lancashire
- List of non-ecclesiastical works by E. G. Paley
