= List of non-ecclesiastical works by E. G. Paley =

E. G. Paley was an English architect who practised from an office in Lancaster, Lancashire in the 19th century. In 1838 he joined Edmund Sharpe as a pupil and became Sharpe's partner in 1845. The practice was then known as "Sharpe and Paley, Architects". Sharpe retired from the practice in 1851 and Paley worked as the only principal in the business until he was joined by Hubert Austin as a partner in 1868.

This list contains the works on buildings and structures other than churches which was carried out by the practice during the time that E. G. Paley was the only principal in the practice, as identified by Price. It includes houses and schools, and a variety of other structures.

== Key ==
Grade	Criteria
Grade II*	Particularly important buildings of more than special interest.
Grade II	Buildings of national importance and special interest.
"—" denotes a work that is not graded.

== Works ==
Name	Location	Photograph	Date	Notes	Grade
Wyresdale Hall	Scorton, Lancashire; 53.9364°N 2.7506°W		1856–58	Enlarged.	II
Abbot's Wood	Barrow-in-Furness, Cumbria	—	1857	A new mansion in Gothic Revival style for Sir James Ramsden. Now demolished.	—
St Peter's Presbytery	Lancaster, Lancashire	—	1857–59	To the southeast of Lancaster Cathedral and built at the same time.	—
The Ridding	Bentham, North Yorkshire; 54.1259°N 2.5601°W		1857–60	A new house in Scottish Baronial style.	II
Dalton Hall	Burton-in-Kendal, Cumbria	—	1859	Additions to an earlier Georgian mansion. This was demolished in 1968 and replaced by a smaller house designed by Clough Williams-Ellis,	—
War memorial	Cemetery, Lancaster, Lancashire; 54.05117°N 2.77759°W	—	1860	A memorial to commemorate the Crimean War.	II
Marine Villa and Piel Cottage	Barrow-in-Furness, Cumbria	—	1861	Billiard room added in 1865.	—
Coniston railway station	Coniston, Cumbria; 54.3686°N 3.07913°W	—	1862	Station for the Coniston Railway in Swiss chalet style.	—
Singleton School	Singleton, Lancashire; 53.8374°N 2.9389°W	—	1862		—
Barrow-in-Furness railway station	Barrow-in-Furness, Cumbria	—	1862–63	This was the Strand station for the Furness Railway. The present station is on a different site.	—
Offices	St George's Square, Barrow-in-Furness, Cumbria	—	1862–63	Offices for the Furness Railway.	—
School	Clapham, North Yorkshire	—	1864	New Church of England school.	—
St Thomas' School	Blackburn, Lancashire	—	1864–65		—
Lancaster Carriage and Wagon Works	Caton Road, Lancaster, Lancashire; 54.0595°N 2.7902°W		1864–65		II
School and school house	Allithwaite, Cumbria	—	1865		II
Vicarage and coach house	Allithwaite, Cumbria	—	1865		—
Furness Abbey railway station	Barrow-in-Furness, Cumbria	—	1865		—
Eccle Riggs	Broughton-in-Furness, Cumbria; 54.2705°N 3.2114°W	—	1865	A country house in Tudor style for Richard Assheton Cross. A dining-room wing was added in 1880 by J. S. Crowther. It has later been used as a leisure club.	—
Grange-over-Sands railway station	Grange-over-Sands, Cumbria; 54.1957°N 2.9028°W	—	1865	This was the original building for the Furness Railway which was later rebuilt.	—
Waiting shelter	Cark and Cartmel railway station, Cumbria; 54.1775°N 2.9728°W		1865	For the Furness Railway.	—
Market	Barrow-in-Furness, Cumbria	—	1866	New building in Gothic style. Now demolished.	—
Grange Hotel	Grange-over-Sands, Cumbria; 54.1975°N 2.9025°W		1866	New hotel.	II
Furness Abbey Hotel	Barrow-in-Furness, Cumbria; 54.1375°N 3.1985°W	—	1866–69	Additions and alterations in Tudor style.	II
St James' School	Barrow-in-Furness, Cumbria	—	1867		—
East Range, Rossall School	Rossall, Fleetwood, Lancashire; 53.8959°N 3.0440°W	—	1867	Paley designed the east wing of the quadrangle, including the gatehouse.	II
St John's National School	Cable Street, Lancaster, Lancashire	—	1868	Now demolished.	—
Royal Albert Hospital	Lancaster, Lancashire; 54.0336°N 2.8008°W		1868–73	New mental hospital.	II*
Greenodd railway station	Greenodd, Cumbria	—	1869		—
Haverthwaite railway station	Haverthwaite, Cumbria; 54.2498°N 2.9997°W		1869		—
Moorgarth	Brookhouse, Caton, Lancashire; 54.0695°N 2.6957°W	—	1869 (?)	A former workhouse, converted into a house.	II
Browhead Hall	Windermere, Cumbria	—	1869 (?)		—
Parkfield House	Greaves Road, Lancaster, Lancashire	—	Undated (before 1872)	New house.	—
School and schoolmaster's house	Bardsea, Cumbria	—	Undated		—

== See also ==
- Sharpe, Paley and Austin
