= Lancaster Carriage and Wagon Works =

Building in Lancaster, Lancashire, England

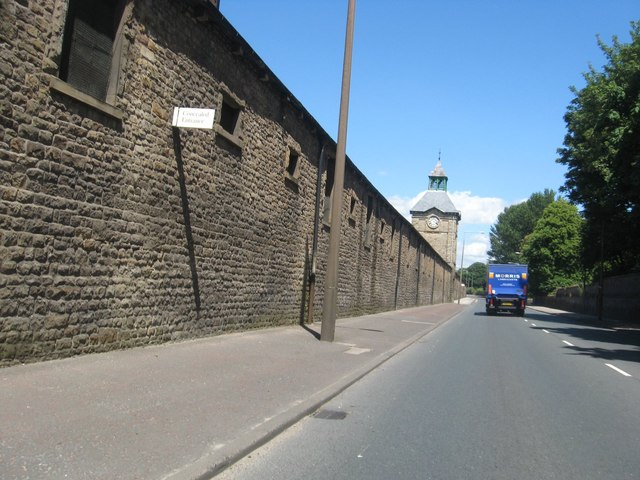

- Location within Lancaster

General information
- Location: Caton Road, Lancaster, Lancashire, England
- Coordinates: 54.0595°N 2.7902°W
- Construction started: 1863
- Completed: 1865

Technical details
- Material: Sandstone with slate roofs

Design and construction
- Architect: E. G. Paley

Listed Building – Grade II
- Official name: Waggon works (front range and office)
- Designated: 13 March 1995
- Reference no.: 1298408

The former Lancaster Carriage and Wagon Works is located in Caton Road, Lancaster, Lancashire, England. The works produced railway rolling stock and trams. The buildings were designed by the local architect E. G. Paley. After the company moved its business elsewhere, the building was used during the First World War for the internment of enemy aliens. It is listed at Grade II, and, as of 2011, is in use as an office, warehouse and factory.

== History ==
The Lancaster Railway Carriage and Wagon Company originated in 1863. Offices and workshops for the company were designed by the local architect E. G. Paley, and built between 1863 and 1865 alongside the North Western Branch of the Midland Railway. The works manufactured railway carriages and wagons, trams, wheels and axles, and provided wagons for hire. It closed in 1908 when its business moved to the Ashbury Railway Carriage and Iron Company Ltd. During the First World War the buildings were used for the internment of enemy aliens. At one time the officer in charge was Robert Graves, who later included his experiences in Lancaster in his autobiography Good-Bye to All That. In 2011, the buildings were being used as an office, warehouse and as part of a factory.

== Architecture ==
The building is constructed in sandstone and has slate roofs. The front which faces Caton Road consists of a long range of single-storey workshops with ventilation provided through a clerestory. It has a central entrance gateway with a tall clock tower. The tower is in three stages. In the bottom stage is the wagon entrance with a rusticated segmental arch, above which are four round-headed windows and a clock face. The tower has a steep pyramidal roof on the top of which is a timber bellcote, also with a pyramidal roof. The office block is in two storeys. It has a wide central bay between two semi-octagonal windows. The front range of the works and the office are recorded in the National Heritage List for England as a designated Grade II listed building.

== See also ==
- Listed buildings in Lancaster, Lancashire
- List of non-ecclesiastical works by E. G. Paley
