= List of tramcars of the National Tramway Museum =

The National Tramway Museum in Crich, Derbyshire, has a large and diverse collection of heritage tramcars, and aims to illustrate the complete development of the traditional British Tramcar. Where it is not possible to show this, tramcars from places as far away as Berlin, the Hague, Douglas, Halle, Howth, Johannesburg, New York City, Porto, Prague and Sydney have been acquired to show this. The majority of the trams at Crich are double-deck trams built between 1900 and 1930, and several have open tops. There are a few trams in the collection that were built after the Second World War, and these give an idea of how the British Tram Industry may have developed if services had not declined.

The museum have part of their website dedicated to the histories of the trams in their collection which can be found here.

== Fleet list ==
Colour Key
In service	On Loan	On display	Under Restoration/Overhaul	In Store	Displayed Unrestored

=== Passenger trams ===
Images	Original System	Car Number	Livery	Year built	Seats	Notes
	Derby Corporation Tramways	1	Green and Cream	1903	45	This tram was built by Brush Electrical Engineering in Loughborough, and was delivered to Derby in December 1903. It used for crew training and infrastructure testing prior to the opening of Derby's electrified tram system on 27 July 1904. Originally an open-topped car, it was later fitted with a top-cover and vestibule, and ran in service until September 1933, ten months before the last Derby tram route closed. After withdrawal, it was sold-off and the lower saloon converted into a summer house in Mickleover. In 1962 it was rescued by the Derby Tramway Group and restoration started. The upper deck was reconstructed from parts salvaged from about a dozen old tram bodies that had belonged to trams from Derby, Nottingham and Leicester. It was displayed briefly at short-lived East Midlands Transport Museum before being acquired by the Tramway Museum Society and placed into storage. In 1991 it was given a cosmetic repaint and moved into Exhibition Hall at Crich. In June 2021 it was moved to the museum's off-site storage facility at Clay Cross. However, in 2023 the tram was returned to Crich for a further cosmetic restoration, before going on loan to the Great Northern Classics venture, located appropriately in the former Derby tram depot at Osmaston Road, where it will be displayed alongside classic motor vehicles and help to provide apprentices with valuable heritage engineering skills. Media related to Derby Corporation Tramways No. 1 at Wikimedia Commons
	Douglas Southern Electric Tramway	1	Crimson and Cream	1896	75	This is the only tram car from the Isle of Man in the collection, the second-oldest electric tram, and the oldest to use a trolley pole for current collection. The car was built by Brush, but equipped with a Lord Baltimore truck imported from the United States. The design is unusual, marrying a toast rack style lower deck with transverse garden seats on an open upper deck. The tram was used on a 3.5-mile (5.6 km) line along Douglas Marine Drive, excavated along a ledge on the cliff face between Douglas Head and Port Soderick. The line never re-opened after having been closed for World War II and, after a period of storage on the island, the car was moved in 1956 to London, where it was restored and put on display in the British Transport Museum. When that museum closed, its ownership was transferred to the city's Science Museum, from whom it has been on long-term loan to the National Tramway Museum since 1975. It is on display in the Exhibition Hall. Media related to Douglas Southern Electric Tramway No. 1 at Wikimedia Commons
	Leamington & Warwick Tramways & Omnibus Company	1	-	1881	42	This double-deck horse tram operated on the single track line between Leamington Spa and Warwick until 1905, when the line was electrified. The car was then sold locally and converted into a bungalow at Claverdon. It was rescued by the Birmingham Railway Museum in 1984 and ownership was transferred it to the Tramway Museum Society in 1993. The car is on display in the Exhibition Hall in unrestored state to illustrate the state that many of museum's tramcars were in at the time they were taken into preservation. Media related to Leamington and Warwick Tramways and Omnibus Company No. 1 at Wikimedia Commons
	London County Council Tramways	1	Blue and Ivory	1932	66	This tram first entered service in 1932, and was intended to revolutionise London's tramcar fleet due to its advanced design, which attempted to encourage off-peak tram-riding while retaining additional capacity for rush-hour services. The car introduced a number of innovations including an all-metal body, four-motor on equal-wheel bogies, a single level lower deck, air-operated brakes, folding platform doors, superior upholstery, improved heating, recessed lighting and brighter interiors with additional space for standing passengers. It was originally painted in a distinctive blue and ivory livery, which gave rise to its nickname of Bluebird. However, the car did not, as was intended, presage a modernised fleet of trams as, shortly after its introduction, London's various transport undertakings were unified under the London Passenger Transport Board, which decided to replace its trams with trolleybuses. LCC 1 operated in London until 1951 when it was sold to Leeds Corporation Tramways, which was short of trams because of the Second World War, where it ran as car 301. It remained operational in Leeds until 1957 and was sold to Crich in 1973. For many years displayed in non-operational status, the London County Council Tramways Trust have funded a restoration, which led to the car being moved into the workshop for restoration in 2014. It has been repainted into its distinctive blue livery, and moved under its own power for the first time since 1957 on 22 April 2024. Media related to London County Council Tramways No. 1 at Wikimedia Commons
	Blackpool & Fleetwood	2	Brown and Cream	1898	56	This tram was one of the ten original trams supplied to the Blackpool & Fleetwood Tramroad, a coastal interurban tramway that connected the towns of Blackpool and Fleetwood across what was then open countryside, and was independent of Blackpool Corporation Tramways that operated that town's trams. The tram is often referred to "Rack 2" on account of its toast rack seating style. The car became part of the corporation fleet in 1920, when the tramroad was acquired, and was renumbered 127. Shortly afterwards the two systems were connected and this enabled the tram to operate along Blackpool promenade for the first time. The car was retired from passenger service in 1938, when it became a works car. It was restored to its original state for the 75th anniversary of Blackpool tramways in 1960. Subsequently transferred to Tramway Museum Society ownership, it was moved to Crich and was the first electric tram to be used in service at Crich in 1964. It returned briefly to Blackpool in 2010 for the 125th Anniversary of the tramway, and it also played a major role in the Electric 50 event at Crich in 2014, where it re-enacted its first service at the museum. It was then withdrawn and awaits overhaul, although it was briefly reactivated on 1 September 2018 to celebrate its 120th birthday. Media related to Blackpool and Fleetwood Tramways No. 2 at Wikimedia Commons
	Blackpool Electric Tramway Company	4	Orange, Green and White	1885	32	This is the oldest electric tram at Crich and was built for the UK's first electric street tramway, which opened on 29 September 1885. The short line was approximately two miles in length and ran along the promenade at Blackpool. The power for the tramcars was provided by means of a conduit system designed by Michael Holroyd Smith, whereby the electric current was carried in a specially constructed channel under the roadway. The conduit system proved vulnerable to sand and saltwater, and after Blackpool Corporation Tramways took control of the line in 1892, the line was converted to overhead electrification, and the car was fitted with a trolley pole. In 1905 it was converted to a works car, and an overhead line access tower was added in 1912. In 1934, the car was put into store, where it remained until 1960, when it was used in the celebration of the line's 75th anniversary. The car was given to the Tramway Museum Society in 1963, and was first exhibited at Crich in 1979. In anticipation of the Blackpool tramway's centenary in 1985, the car was restored, as far as possible, to its original condition. To simulate conduit running, it was fitted with a new, home-built truck powered by lead acid batteries. It briefly returned to Blackpool in order to take part in the centenary celebrations. In 2005, it ran for the 50th anniversary of the TMS, though not carrying passengers. It is now on display in the Exhibition Hall. Media related to Blackpool Electric Tramway Company No. 4 at Wikimedia Commons
	Blackpool	5	Green and Cream	1972	48	This car was built in 1972, using the lengthened frames of English Electric central-entrance railcoach 221 (later 609) built in 1934. The car was built to permit one man operation (OMO) on the tramway during the quieter winter months. It operated in this role until 1993, when it was withdrawn from passenger service in rather poor condition and with severe corrosion problems. Ownership was transferred to the Tramway Museum Society in 2000, and it was transferred to the museum's off site storage facility at Clay Cross, where it remains in unrestored condition. It is one of only two surviving complete Blackpool OMO cars. Media related to Blackpool Tramway OMO car 5 at Wikimedia Commons
	Gateshead and District Tramways	5	Crimson and Cream	1927	48	This car was built in 1927 by, and for, Gateshead and District Tramways, who unusually for the UK used long single-deck trams because of the presence of a low bridge that precluded the use of double-deck trams. When the Gateshead system closed in 1951, it was sold to British Rail and transferred to the Grimsby & Immingham Electric Railway, the same tramway that 14 originates from. Renumbered as 20 and repainted in that line's green colours, it operated there until 1961, when that line closed. The car was acquired by the Tramway Museum Society and brought to Crich in 1963. Between 1965 and 1973 it was gradually restored to its Gateshead condition and livery. It first entered service at Crich in 1966 and has had several spells in traffic since then. Most recently, it was withdrawn from service in 2007 and is on display in the Exhibition Hall. Media related to Gateshead and District Tramways No. 5 at Wikimedia Commons
	Chesterfield Corporation Tramways	7	Crimson and Yellow	1904	56	Built, as one of 12 open-topped double deckers, by the Brush Electrical Engineering Company at Loughborough, coincidentally helping to replace horse-tram 8, also in the collection. It was damaged but narrowly escaped destruction in a fire which gutted the tramshed in 1916. It was restored and a top canopy was added in 1919, but then sold off in 1927 for use as a holiday home near Matlock. It was purchased by the museum in 1973, and restored to operational condition in the 1990s. Media related to Chesterfield Corporation Tramways No. 7 at Wikimedia Commons
	Chesterfield Corporation Tramways	8	Cream and Blue	1904	16	Tramcar No. 8 was one of the last horse trams built for normal passenger service. Was on long-term loan from the Science Museum but passed into Crich ownership in 2016. On display in the Exhibition Hall. Media related to Chesterfield Corporation Tramways No. 8 at Wikimedia Commons
	Companhia Carris de Ferro do Porto	9	Yellow, White and Red	1873	20	This trailer car from the city of Porto in Portugal is the only vehicle in the collection which has been hauled by three different forms of traction: mules, steam and electricity. It is also the oldest tram in the collection. On display in the Exhibition Hall. Media related to Porto tram 9 at Wikimedia Commons
	Hill of Howth	10	Brown	1902	73	This tram operated on a short but scenic route north of Dublin and is the only Irish car in the collection at Crich. On display in the Exhibition Hall. Media related to Hill of Howth 10 at Wikimedia Commons
	Grimsby & Immingham Light Railway	14	Green	1915	72	This car was built by the Great Central Railway for use on the line that the railway company built to convey dock workers from Grimsby to its new, and rather isolated, coal dock at Immingham. Partly built parallel to the steam railway carrying coal to the docks, but not connected to it, and partly running in the street, this line is variously described as an interurban tramway or as an electric railway, and car 14 demonstrates this hybrid nature. When the line closed in 1961, the car was preserved, initially in store at Clay Cross (then a British Rail facility) before going to the National Railway Museum at York in 1988. It has been at Crich since 1990. Media related to Grimsby and Immingham No. 14 at Wikimedia Commons
	Sheffield Tramways Company	15	Red and Cream	1874	16	Number 15 holds quite a special place in the museum's collection - it was the first tram to operate in 1963, before the overhead wires were functional. It is also the museum's sole operable horse tram, and usually only operates a few times a year, on the Edwardian Weekend and several 'horse tram' days, with appropriate motive power, in recent years from 'Joseph'. Media related to Sheffield Tramways Company No. 15 at Wikimedia Commons
	Dundee and District Tramways	21	Green and White	1894	66	This is a steam tram trailer, being towed instead of powered. On display in the Exhibition Hall. Media related to Dundee and District Tramways No. 21 at Wikimedia Commons
	Glasgow Corporation Tramways	22	Orange, Crimson and Cream	1922	62	Built in 1922 and withdrawn from active service at the end of 1960. Used on the first day of electric tram operation at Crich in June 1964 along with Blackpool and Fleetwood 2 and Blackpool 49. Operated nearly 4,000 miles at the Glasgow Garden Festival in 1988. Re-entered Crich service in October 2016 following a mid-life overhaul. Media related to Glasgow Corporation Tramways No. 22 at Wikimedia Commons
	Edinburgh Corporation Tramways	35	Madder and Cream	1948	62	Built as a double deck fully enclosed semi-streamlined electric tram, this car was only eight years old when its home system closed in 1956. In 1962 it became the centre-piece of a brand new transport museum in Edinburgh. Unfortunately that museum closed in 1979 and its owners, Edinburgh City Council, placed it in store until 1985, when it was loaned to Blackpool, where it operated on the Blackpool Tramway. In 1988 it moved to Glasgow, where it operated in the Glasgow Garden Festival, finally arriving at Crich in 1989. Since then the car has been on static display, and was transferred to TMS ownership in June 2008. Received a cosmetic overhaul in 2013 and is on display in the Exhibition Hall. Media related to Edinburgh Corporation Tramways No. 35 at Wikimedia Commons
	Blackpool & Fleetwood	40	Teak and Cream	1914	44	This car was built in 1914 for the Blackpool & Fleetwood Tramroad Company, and was renumbered 114 in 1920 when Blackpool Corporation took over the tramroad company. It was converted into permanent way gang car 5 in 1936 and remained in use until 1960. It was restored to its original state as number 40 for the Blackpool tramway 75th Anniversary in 1960. In 1963 it was presented to the National Tramway Museum, but has spent most of its preservation life on loan to Blackpool Transport, where it operated on the promenade as well as making a couple of rare returns to Crich. It received a mid life overhaul in 2014, to which both Blackpool and Crich contributed. The long-term loan to Blackpool ended in March 2019 and the tram spent the summer on loan to Beamish Museum, before returning permanently to Crich in September 2019. Media related to Blackpool and Fleetwood Tramways No. 40 at Wikimedia Commons
	Blackpool Corporation Transport	40	Red, White and Teak	1926	78	40 is an example of the Blackpool Standard trams, built in the 1920s to improve Blackpool's tram fleet. Some of which were fully enclosed but others, like 40, had open balconies. It was the last open balcony tram to operate in Great Britain, being withdrawn in 1963 and was then transferred to Crich almost immediately. It first entered service at Crich in 1964 wearing Blackpool's later green livery and was given a thorough overhaul in 1983/4, where it was restored to its original 1931 condition with red livery. 40 has covered more than 43,000 miles at Crich, making the most intensively used tram in Crich history. Repainted in 2016 and currently undergoing a bogie overhaul. Media related to Blackpool Corporation Transport No. 40 at Wikimedia Commons
	Nottingham Corporation Tramways	45	Brown and White	1901	56	An originally open-top tram. Only the lower saloon survives. Cosmetically restored in Nottingham; moved to Crich in 2018.
	Southampton Corporation Tramways	45	Red and White	1903	56	Southampton 45 was built by Hurst Nelson as an open-top double-decker tram with a 3 windowed lower saloon. At some stage it was rebuilt with canopies and 4 saloon windows by Southampton Corporation Tramways, however the exact date is unknown. The tram's proportions are dictated by the need to pass under the medieval Bargate, and it also has knifeboard seating on the top deck for this reason. This tram was the very first tram to be acquired for the museum, and was bought for the very expensive (in those days) sum of £10. Withdrawn from Crich service in September 2014 but was briefly reactivated on Saturday 19 September 2015 for the Tramway Museum Society 60th anniversary event. On display in the Exhibition Hall. Media related to Southampton Corporation Tramways No. 45 at Wikimedia Commons
	Sheffield Corporation Tramways	46	Blue and Cream	1899	28	No. 46 was one of twelve single decker trams purchased for the opening of the electric tramways, before later being converted to a works car. It was moved into store in 2003, along with Leeds 600 and Glasgow 1100. Media related to Sheffield Corporation Tramways No. 46 at Wikimedia Commons
	New South Wales Government Railways	(47)	Brown	1885	0	A Steam Tram known as "John Bull". Built for use in Australia for the New South Wales Government Railways, where it remained for five years, employed on railway and colliery construction projects. It then went to the Beyer, Peacock & Company works in Manchester, where it had been built, and lost its side wheel skirts in order to operate as a railway shunter until 1959. The vehicle arrived at Crich in 1962 and was steamed a few times from 1966. It was steamed again in the 1980s and in 1985 it successfully operated along the Blackpool Promenade for the centenary of Blackpool Tramway. It remained operational until 1989 and has been on display ever since. It was loaned to the Manchester Museum of Science & Industry in 2009 for an event celebrating the Anniversary of the first Beyer, Peacock & Company steam locomotive. On display in the Exhibition Hall. Media related to New South Wales Government steam tram No. 47 at Wikimedia Commons
	Blackpool Corporation Transport	49	Green and Cream	1926	78	An enclosed Standard tramcar, in green and cream livery. Similar to 40. Used on the first day of electric tram operations at Crich in June 1964 along with Blackpool and Fleetwood 2 and Glasgow 22. Remained in the Crich operating fleet for nearly 30 years before being withdrawn from service in 1992 for a major overhaul which it still awaits. Media related to Blackpool Corporation Transport No. 49 at Wikimedia Commons
	Blackpool Corporation Transport	59	Red, White and Teak	1902	93	Called a "Dreadnought" car - last of its kind. In storage at Clay Cross. Media related to Blackpool Tramway No. 59 at Wikimedia Commons
	Johannesburg	60	Red and Cream	1905	62	This tram, from the city of Johannesburg in South Africa, has bi-lingual signs in both Afrikaans and English, and was one of many built in the UK for export to all corners of the British Empire. It has also starred in many TV and Film productions. Withdrawn from Crich service in 2013. Media related to Johannesburg Tramways No. 60 at Wikimedia Commons
	Paisley District Tramways	68	See Glasgow Corporation Tramways No. 1068			
	Sheffield Corporation Tramways	74	Blue and Cream	1900	52	After being sold to Gateshead, where it ran in much modified form until that system closed, Sheffield 74's lower deck survived as a suburban garden shed in the town. During its restoration at Crich in the 1990s it was fitted with an Edwardian Sheffield top deck. Returned to service in 2018 following an overhaul. Media related to Sheffield Corporation Tramways No. 74 at Wikimedia Commons
	Birmingham Central Tramways	75	N/A	1888	44	Car 75 was designed for use on the steeply inclined route between Colmore Row and New Inns in Birmingham as previous horse-drawn trams needed an extra set of horses to propel them up the hills whilst fully loaded with passengers. It remained in service until 1911 when the company's lease expired. The vehicle spent the next 60 years as a summer house until being acquired by the Black Country Living Museum in the 1970s. It remained in storage there until 2017 when it was very kindly donated to Crich and was moved into storage at Clay Cross. Only the lower deck survives.
	Leicester Corporation Tramways	76	Brown and Cream	1904	56	Originally built as an open top car, but was fitted with a roof shortly after the First World War. A second rebuilding resulted in the car gaining a totally enclosed saloon on the top deck and vestibules on each platform. It was discovered on a farm near Snaith in Yorkshire, and has been restored to its 1920s condition. It was the first tram to be restored on site. On display in the Exhibition Hall. Media related to Leicester City Tramways No. 76 at Wikimedia Commons
	Manchester, Bury, Rochdale and Oldham Steam Tramways Company	84	?	1886	0	It is a Wilkinson Patent Vertical Boiler Steam tram built by Beyer, Peacock & Company in 1886, running until 1904 when it was converted into a railway shunter by the loss of its side wheel skirts and went to a foundry in Wigan until 1954. Unlike No. 47, which originally operated in Australia, No. 84 represents a typical steam tram that operated in Great Britain. Given to the NTM from the Manchester Museum of Science & Industry in 2002. It is one of two Wilkinson Patent Vertical Steam Boilers, the other being No. 47 "John Bull". In store off site at Clay Cross in a dismantled state.
	Bournemouth Corporation Tramways	85	Crimson and Yellow	1914	68	This tram was designed for a track gauge of 3 ft 6 in (1,070 mm), meaning that it cannot operate on the running line at Crich which is standard gauge. Arrived at Crich in 2017 and is on static display in the Exhibition Hall.
	Nottingham Corporation Tramways	92	Brown and White	1902	56	An open-top tram. Only the lower saloon survives. In store at Clay Cross since 1996.
	Sunderland Corporation Tramways	100	See Metropolitan Electric Tramways No. 331			
	Newcastle Corporation Tramways	102	Black, Yellow and White	1901	84	A very similar tram to Blackpool 59. Was often seen taking Dockers to work in its home town because of its large seating capacity. This tram was originally a single-decker, as can be seen with the cramped platforms where staircases were squashed in. Withdrawn from Crich service in 2000 requiring an overhaul and attention to a broken axle. The tram's long-awaited overhaul began in June 2018. Work will involve the replacement of two axles, motor overhauls, a rewire, a complete rebuild of the north platform, resealing of the windows and a repaint. Media related to Newcastle Corporation Tramways No. 102 at Wikimedia Commons
	London County Council Tramways	106	Cream and Crimson	1903	57	The first tram restored by the LCCTT, this made its inaugural run at Crich exactly 80 years after its original line opened. Originally had conduit pickup. First entered service at Crich in 1983 after an extensive restoration. Re-entered service in June 2015 after an overhaul, having been out of regular service for eight years. Media related to London County Council Tramways No. 106 at Wikimedia Commons
	Leeds Tramways Company	107	Brown, Yellow and White	1898	34	Double-deck horse tram. Arrived at the Museum 27 August 2013. On display in the Exhibition Hall.
	Nottingham Corporation Tramways	121	N/A	1908	56	An open-balcony tram. Only one end of the lower saloon survives. In store at Clay Cross.
	Kingston-upon-Hull	132	Red, White and Yellow	1910	62	This four wheel tram was originally built with a top cover but without vestibules and with open balconies. It featured Hull unusual centre-flanged wheels, designed to run on that system's centre-grooved standard gauge track. In 1931 it was fitted with a new top deck and became fully enclosed; it received a replacement second hand truck in 1933–4. In 1942 it was sold to Leeds Corporation Tramways, where it became their number 446 before being withdrawn in 1952. Acquired for preservation, it was worked on in Bolton before being transferred to Crich in 1960. It was loaned to Hull's Streetlife Museum of Transport on a long-term basis in 1983, where it remains. Media related to Hull City Tramways No. 132 at Wikimedia Commons
	London United Tramways	159	Blue and White	1901	69	This early car was one of a batch of 150 cars built to a particularly luxurious specification to serve London's affluent western suburbs, between Hampton Court, Hammersmith and Wimbledon. Restoration for this particular tramcar was funded by the London County Council Tramways Trust. Whilst some of 159's classmates were rebuilt in later life with top covers, 159 was declared surplus to requirements in 1923, still in original condition. Its lower saloon was converted into a house in Ewhurst Green, where it survived to be donated to the museum in 1978. After a period of storage, restoration commenced with financial support from the London County Council Tramways Trust. After 7 years in the workshop, the car returned to service in 2012. The car represents an early example of a high-capacity Edwardian era bogie tramcar that heralded a departure from the far more typical four wheel double deck tramcars of its time. It entered the workshop in 2021 for remedial work, but returned to active service in 2022. Media related to London United Tramways No. 159 at Wikimedia Commons
	Blackpool Corporation Transport	166	Red and White	1927	64	Known as a toastrack car, due to its open air seating arrangement and lack of bodywork. This tram was designed predominantly to provide holidaymakers with sight-seeing opportunities along the Promenade. The conductor had to go along the side of the tram to collect the fares but modifications in 1936 saw the fitting of a central gangway between the seats so as to make collecting fares easier. It remained in passenger service until 1945 when it was withdrawn and acquired by the BBC and converted to an outside broadcast vehicle. This was so they could film the annual Blackpool illuminations. Crich acquired the tram in 1972 and in 1974 it was restored to original 1927 condition with the full width seats and red livery. Received a heavy mechanical overhaul in the early 2000s and was also given a slight repaint and further repairs in 2010/11. Undergoing bogie overhaul. Media related to Blackpool Corporation Transport No. 166 at Wikimedia Commons
	Nottingham Corporation Tramways	166	White and teak	1920	64	The third Nottingham tram to be acquired by the Museum. An open balcony tram but only the lower saloon survives. In store at Clay Cross.
	Blackpool Corporation Transport	167	Green and Cream	1928	52	This was the first of 10 single deck cars, called Pantographs, built to operate the Blackpool and Fleetwood inter-urban tramway. 167 is the only surviving complete Pantograph in existence. Restored at Crich in 1985 and received a further overhaul in 1998. Returned to service in 2012 following repairs. Visited the Beamish Museum and then Blackpool Tramway in 2014. Media related to Blackpool Corporation Transport No. 167 at Wikimedia Commons
	Leeds Corporation Tramways	180	Red and Cream	1931	60	These trams were known as "Showboats" or "Horsfield" when they first entered service. Returned to Crich service in 2010 and received a rewire in 2018. Media related to Leeds City Tramways No. 180 at Wikimedia Commons
	Prague City Tramways	180	Red and White	1908	26	This car was built by Ringhoffer, one of the companies that eventually became ČKD Tatra, as Prague 266. It operated in Prague until 1949, then in Olomouc until 1967. At that time, Crich received a visit by a group of representatives of Tatra, who offered to donate a tramcar to the TMS collection. This car was selected and overhauled by Tatra, and given the number 180, a member of the same class that featured on a famous early photograph crossing the Charles Bridge in Prague. The tram made a dramatic journey from Czechoslovakia, crossing the border just hours before the Russian invasion of Czechoslovakia. The car was withdrawn from Crich service in 2002, after over 30 years of operation at the museum. Media related to Prague Tramways No. 180 at Wikimedia Commons
	London Tramways Co.	184	N/A	1895	46	The Curry Rivel Horse Car was transferred to Clay Cross in February 2005. In order to preserve what was left of the vehicle, it was dismantled in 2014. Restoration to working condition planned to commence after the completion of Blackpool 298.
	Sheffield Corporation Tramways	189	Blue and Cream	1934	61	This is the only surviving example of Sheffield's Standard Cars. Withdrawn from Crich service in 1980 and is on display in the depot. Media related to Sheffield Corporation Tramways No. 189 at Wikimedia Commons
	Blackpool Corporation Tramways	236	Green and Cream	1934	56	Blackpool Boat car, formerly number 607. Spent all of its working life at Blackpool and was acquired by Crich in 2011. It was restored to original 1930s condition in Blackpool and entered Crich service for the first time in 2012. Media related to Blackpool Corporation Transport No. 236 at Wikimedia Commons
	Blackpool Corporation Tramways	249	Green and Cream	1934	94	Blackpool Balloon car, formerly number 712. On display in the Exhibition Hall, in 1930s livery but 1980s condition. Media related to Blackpool Corporation Transport No. 249 at Wikimedia Commons
	Sheffield Corporation Tramways	264	Cream and Blue	1937	61	This is the only surviving example of the rebuilt Standard Cars, known as Dome roof cars. Withdrawn from Crich service in 1980 and is on display in the Exhibition Hall. Media related to Sheffield Corporation Tramways No. 264 at Wikimedia Commons
	Oporto	273	Ochre and White	1927	40	This tram represents the type of design used in countries with hot climates. The side windows can be slid into the roof, making the tram open sided and allowing the passengers greater comfort. The restoration of this tram was completed in 2002 with funding from the Heritage Lottery Fund, and has received an award from the Heritage Railway Association. Returned to service in 2014 following repairs. Received a new axle in 2018. Media related to Oporto Tramways No. 273 at Wikimedia Commons
	Blackpool Corporation Transport	298	Green and Cream (when restored)	1937	48	Partially restored. Moved to offsite storage at Clay Cross in 2014 and returned to Crich in June 2021 ready for its restoration to commence. A new underframe has been constructed at the Ffestiniog Railway. It will be restored to original 1930s condition. Restoration began in 2021, shortly after the new underframe was delivered. Media related to Blackpool Corporation Transport No. 298 at Wikimedia Commons
	Metropolitan Electric Tramways	331	Red and White	1930	70	This car was built as one of three in a batch of experimental tramcars, each incorporating slightly different design features. Elements of each of these prototypes’ design were incorporated in a fleet of 100 modern trams that came to be known as “Felthams” because they were built by the Union Construction Company that was based in Feltham. The centre doors that distinguish this car were not carried forward to the production cars that instead have end doors. The car was sold to Sunderland in 1936, becoming their No.100 and remaining in service until 1951. The car was sold to the Light Railway Transport League, whose founder member, JW Fowler, was responsible for its preservation. It was then stored in various locations before arriving in Crich in 1961. It was restored, with funding by British Steel, Gateshead Garden Festival in 1990, where it appeared in a British Steel blue livery. On return to Crich, it was returned to its Metropolitan Electric Tramways identity and colours. Media related to Metropolitan Electric Tramways Feltham Car No. 331 / Sunderland No. 100 at Wikimedia Commons
	Leeds Corporation Tramways	345	Blue and White	1921	62	A Leeds enclosed double decker. Withdrawn early due to poor bodywork, was used as a carpenters tea shed at a Leeds depot. One of the first cars at Crich and its restoration to full working order was completed in 2006. Returned to Crich service in 2012 following overhaul. Media related to Leeds City Tramways Convert Car No. 345 at Wikimedia Commons
	Leeds Corporation Tramways	399	Brown, Yellow and White	1926	70	A Leeds "Hamilton Air-brake" car, tramcar 399 was built at Leeds Kirkstall Works. The second tram to arrive at Crich, it underwent a lengthy restoration, returning to service only in 1991, and then repaired and returned again to service in 2011. It is fitted with a trolley pole, without a rope, meaning that it can use trolley reversers at the termini. It is currently in the operational pool, after undergoing remedial work to the exterior paintwork. Media related to Leeds City Tramways No. 399 at Wikimedia Commons
	Sheffield Corporation Tramways	510	Cream and Blue	1950	62	A Roberts car, believed to have done more mileage at Crich than in service. It carries a special "Last Tram" livery, and, along with its sister 513 at Lowestoft, took part in the farewell celebrations. An overhaul and return to service was completed in 2014. Media related to Sheffield Corporation Tramways No. 510 at Wikimedia Commons
	Leeds Corporation Tramways	600	Red and White	1930	34	This car became one of three experimental cars in 1954. The others were 601 and 602. In store at Clay Cross.
	Leeds Corporation Tramways	602	Purple and White	1953	34	One of three experimental tramcars, the others being 600 and 601. 602 is the only tramcar at the museum to use VAMBAC. It is identical to 601 including the livery but differs from 601 in the control system and bogies, 601 using EP and having lightweight bogies. 601 was preserved, but was destroyed in an Arson attack. On display in the Exhibition Hall. Media related to Leeds City Tramways VAMBAC No. 602 at Wikimedia Commons
	Blackpool Corporation Transport	630	Green and Cream	1937	48	Blackpool Brush car, repainted in 1990s livery. Arrived at Crich 22/12/11 and entered Crich service for the first time in 2012. Spent several months on loan to Blackpool Tramway from late 2017-mid 2018. Media related to Blackpool Tramways No. 630 at Wikimedia Commons
	Blackpool Transport Services	645	Red and white	1987		Blackpool Centenary car. Donated by Blackpool Transport Services in July 2023. To be evaluated for conversion to a wheelchair friendly "Access tram". Requires refurbishment. Media related to Blackpool Tramway No. 645 at Wikimedia Commons
	New York 3rd Avenue Transit	674	Cream and Red	1939	49	No. 674 is the only American tram in the collection at Crich. It was also sent to Vienna after the Second World War. First entered service at Crich in 1970 and was withdrawn in 1985 pending overhaul, which it still awaits. Has operated in both its American and Vienna guises in preservation. Media related to New York 3rd Avenue Transit No. 674 at Wikimedia Commons
	Blackpool Corporation Transport	762	All-over advert for Nickelodeon Land	1982	90	Blackpool Jubilee car. Retains former-all-over advert livery. Entered Crich service for the first time at the Electric 50 event in September 2014. Requires motor repairs. Media related to Blackpool Tramway No. 762 at Wikimedia Commons
	Glasgow Corporation Tramways	812	Orange, Yellow and Brown	1900	59	Built in 1900 as an open top tram, 812 acquired a top cover with open balconies ten years later and platform vestibules within a further two years. Withdrawn from Crich service in November 2015. Media related to Glasgow Corporation Tramways No. 812 at Wikimedia Commons
	Liverpool Corporation Passenger Transport	869	Green and White	1936	78	869 was sold to Glasgow in 1954, withdrawn in 1960. It is often referred to as the "Green Goddess". Returned to service in September 2015 following overhaul. Media related to Liverpool Corporation Passenger Transport No. 869 at Wikimedia Commons
	Halle	902	Red and Cream	1969	26	This tram represents the largest class of trams ever built, the Tatra T3 family built by ČKD Tatra in Czechoslovakia, of which 17,622 were eventually built. The family is based on the US PCC streetcar design, which was licensed to ČKD Tatra, but, unlike the museum's other PCC car, Den Haag 1147, used a different body design. Car 902 is actually a Tatra T4D, a narrower-bodied version of the T3 built for use in East Germany. It was built as a single-ended car, but rebuilt by Halle as double-ended, one of only two such cars. It continued to operate in Halle until the turn of the century, and sister car 901 is now in that city's preserved fleet. The car was acquired by the Tramway Museum Society in 2005 in operable condition, with the intention of converting it into a second access tram, to run alongside Berlin 223 006-4. However that proved not to be possible, and in 2018 it was placed on loan to Blackpool to free up storage space. It returned from Blackpool in 2022 and is now in off-site storage, with an uncertain future. Media related to Halle an der Saale tram 902 at Wikimedia Commons
	Glasgow Corporation Tramways	1068	Orange, Cream and Blue	1919	63	This car was originally build by Hurst Nelson in 1919 as Paisley District Tramways No. 68, and carried that undertaking's Red and Cream livery. It was built with an open top and open platforms, a relatively old-fashioned design for that time but necessitated by a low bridge on one of Paisley's main routes. When Glasgow Corporation took over the Paisley company in 1923, this car was repainted in that operator's blue route livery (Orange, Cream and Blue) and given the number 1068. Over the following years it was repeatedly rebuilt, with the addition a top cover with open balconies (1924), and then full enclosure together with the provision of a new truck and higher speed motors (1931). It was withdrawn from service in 1953 and gifted to the Scottish Tramway Museum Society for preservation. After a brief period of display in Paisley to commemorate the Golden Jubilee of the city's tramways, the car was then moved to Crich in September 1960. Over the following years it was restored to its original 1919 state as Paisley 68, albeit retaining the 1931 truck and motors, and it entered service on the museum running line in 1978. In 1988, it operated on the tramway at Glasgow Garden Festival. In 2009, it was placed into store, before receiving a truck overhaul and returning to service in 2012 repainted as Glasgow 1068. It was taken out of service again in November 2016. Media related to Paisley District Tramways No. 68 / Glasgow Corporation Tramways No. 1068 at Wikimedia Commons
	Glasgow Corporation Tramways	1100	Orange, Green and Cream	1928	69	An attempt at modernising old trams to look like Glasgow's new streamliners (like 1282 and 1297), known as the Horrornation due to extreme ugliness. Unusually, it has EP controller but only 2 motors. In store off site at Clay Cross Media related to Glasgow Corporation Tramways No. 1100 at Wikimedia Commons
	Glasgow Corporation Tramways	1115	Orange, Cream and Red	1929	68	Kilmarnock Bogie. The upgrade to 812. On display in the Exhibition Hall. Media related to Glasgow Corporation Tramways No. 1115 at Wikimedia Commons
	Den Haag	1147	Cream and Green	1958	36	This car represents the classic mid-20th century United States' tram design, the PCC streetcar, which was one of the most influential tramcar designs of all time. In North America a total of 4978 PCC units were eventually produced between 1936 and 1952, and many thousands more were built under license elsewhere. This car was built by La Brugeoise et Nivelles of Belgium for use in the capital city of the Netherlands. Unlike the museum's other PCC car, Halle 902, car 1147 resembles the North American cars in its body style as well as its technical innards. Den Haag's PCC cars continued in use until 1993. This car was acquired the following year by the Tramway Museum Society as an example of such an influential design. As a single-ended tram, needing turning facilities at each end of its route, it cannot be operated at Crich, but it has been cosmetically restored and is on display in the Exhibition Hall to illustrate the worldwide evolution of tramcar design. Media related to Den Haag Tramways No. 1147 at Wikimedia Commons
	Glasgow Corporation Transport	1282	Orange, Cream and Green	1940	64	The Glasgow "Coronation" streamliners were designed in 1936 in preparation for the Empire Exhibition to be held in the city in 1938. Intended to act as ambassadors for the city, they were built to the highest level of specification, with art deco features. Car 1282 remained in service until the Glasgow tramways closed, and ran in the closing procession in 1962. It was moved to the National Tramway Museum in 1963. After a period of initial storage, restoration started in 1977 and it entered service at Crich in 1978. It operated until 2003 when it was withdrawn, but it was temporarily reactivated for the Glasgow 50 event in 2012. The Scottish Tramway and Transport Society have set up a fund to restore Glasgow 1282 and return it to operational service. Media related to Glasgow Corporation Tramways No. 1282 at Wikimedia Commons
	Glasgow Corporation Transport	1297	Orange, Cream and Green	1948	70	A Glasgow "Cunarder" streamliner, 1297 also ran in the closing procession in 1962. Withdrawn from Crich service in 2009. On display in the Exhibition Hall pending on overhaul. Media related to Glasgow Corporation Tramways No. 1297 at Wikimedia Commons
	London Passenger Transport Board	1622	Red and White	1912	73	Represents the "rehabilitated" E1 London trams of the 1930s. Restored in 1997 and has been in regular use ever since. Withdrawn from Crich service in 2016 and a mid-life overhaul was started in December 2018. Media related to London Passenger Transport Board No. 1622 at Wikimedia Commons
	Berlin	223 006–4	Cream and Black	1969	16 + 4 Wheelchairs	This car is of a type known as a Rekowagen and was built in 1969 for operation on the extensive East Berlin tramway, where it was designed to pull two trailers. It was acquired by the museum in 1996, and was converted for use as an access tram to carry wheelchairs, with the addition of wider doors, an external wheelchair lift and a flat floor. It entered service in 1997, initially carrying the number 3006. The car was overhauled during winter 2011/12, with its orange and white livery replaced by cream and black and reverting to its original number of 223 006–4. As the museum's only access tram, the car was in continual use and this took its toll. It was decided to retire it at the end of the 2023 season. Media related to Berlin Tramways No. 3006 at Wikimedia Commons
	Hull City Tramways	?	N/A	1903	58	A double-deck tram that was originally built as an open-topper, but was fitted with covered tops before entering service. All that is known about the tram's operating history is that it was originally acquired for the Hendon route. The fleet number is unknown. Only the lower deck survives. In store off site at Clay Cross.

=== Works trams and vehicles ===
Images	Original System	Vehicle Number and Name	Livery	Year built	Notes
	Glasgow Corporation Tramways	1	N/A	1905	A unique vehicle which was used for laying underground feeder cables. In store at Clay Cross.
	Blackpool Corporation Tramways	2	Cream and Grey	1935	A Railgrinder works tram. Previously used at Crich to reenact the Blackpool illuminations. In store at Clay Cross.
	Leeds Corporation Tramways	2	Grey and Red	1932	A self-propelled tower wagon. Originally preserved on the Middleton Railway. Arrived at Crich in 1969. Operated as a tower wagon at Crich until 2006, although was briefly reactivated in 2010. Although no longer used as a tower wagon, it does still run occasionally. On display in the Exhibition Hall. Media related to Leeds City Tramways No. 2 at Wikimedia Commons
	Glasgow Corporation Tramways	21	N/A	1903	A tool van. Was used as Crich's first bookshop, and was then displayed at Wakebridge from 1972 until 2005. In store at Clay Cross. Media related to Glasgow Corporation Tramways No. 21 at Wikimedia Commons
	Tramlink	058+061	Red	1978	Diesel-powered two-axle unit (058) with hydraulic crane; and matching two-axle trailer flat (061). German Klv 53 (de) manufactured in 1978 by Sollinger Hütte (de). Previously numbered DB Netz 53 0692-3; Deutsche Bundesbahn 53.0692.
	Brussels	96	Brown	1905	Built in Philadelphia and used as a snowbroom in Brussels. Preserved at Crich in 1995. On display in the Exhibition Hall.
	Cardiff Corporation Tramways	131	Maroon and White	1905	Purpose-built water carrier and rail grinder. The very first tram to arrive at Crich, it was restored to its former glory for the 50th Anniversary celebrations in 2009 and is now in use as a water car and a track scrubbing and driver training vehicle. It has also undertaken similar duties at other tramways, such as at Blackpool during winter 2011/12 undertaking track scrubbing duties. Media related to Cardiff Corporation Tramways No. 131 at Wikimedia Commons
	Sheffield Transport Department	330	Blue and White	1919	Originally a 4 ft (1.2 m) gauge Bradford double decker, bought by Sheffield during the Second World War to replace bombed trams. Converted to water carrying car/rail grinder. Usually on display as most of its duties are now performed by Cardiff 131 but it occasionally operates at special events and performs maintenance tasks in the absence of 131. Media related to Sheffield Tramway No. 330 at Wikimedia Commons
	Blackpool Corporation Transport	717	Green	1927	Electric works locomotive. Operated in Blackpool from 1927 to 1963. Arrived at Crich in 1966. In regular use as a shunting and works vehicle. Media related to Blackpool Tramway No. 717 at Wikimedia Commons
	Crich Quarry	223741 Rupert	Green	1944	Re-gauged 4wdm Ruston diesel locomotive, formerly narrow gauge shunter. Has been operational at Crich as a shunting and works vehicle but is now on display in the Exhibition Hall.
	Crich Quarry	326058 GMJ	Maroon	1952	Re-gauged 4wdm Ruston diesel locomotive, formerly narrow gauge shunter and operated at the quarry adjacent to the tramway. Based at Crich ever since it became surplus to requirements at the quarry in the 1960s, and was re-gauged shortly after arrival. Has been operational for many years and is in regular use as a shunting and works vehicle.

=== Buses ===
Images	Original System	Car Number	Livery	Year built	Seats	Notes
	Barnsley & District Electric Traction Company	5	Green	1913		In 1913 Barnsley & District Electric Traction Company bought 5 single decker buses with the intention of testing the operation of petrol motor buses as an alternative to electric trams. Car No. 5 has several tramway like features, including the use of a combination car design, and is believed to be the oldest British full-size single decker bus in existence, possibly the oldest in the world. It was acquired by the Tramway Museum Society in late 2018, is in operational condition, and is displayed in the Exhibition Hall. Media related to Barnsley & District Electric Traction bus 5 at Wikimedia Commons
