= Tramcars of the Chesterfield Tramway =

This is a list of all horse-drawn and electric tramcars of the Chesterfield Tramway, which opened on 8 November 1882, and closed on 23 December 1927. The tramway's gauge was 4 ft 8 1/2 in (1,435 mm) (standard gauge).

== Horse cars built between 1882 and 1903 ==
Car numbers	Type (as built)	Year built	Builder	Seats	Truck	Motors	Controllers
1-2	Open top	1882	Ashbury	32	N/A	N/A	N/A
3	Single deck	1882	Ashbury	16	N/A	N/A	N/A
4-5	Single deck	1890	Milnes	16	N/A	N/A	N/A
6	Single deck	1898	Milnes	16	N/A	N/A	N/A
7-8	Single deck	1899	Milnes	16	N/A	N/A	N/A
9	Open top	1903	Ashbury	32	N/A	N/A	N/A

Turner states that two tramcars were bought in 1903, which had previously been owned by Sheffield Tramway, and that they were probably never renumbered.

== Electric cars built between 1904 and 1927 ==
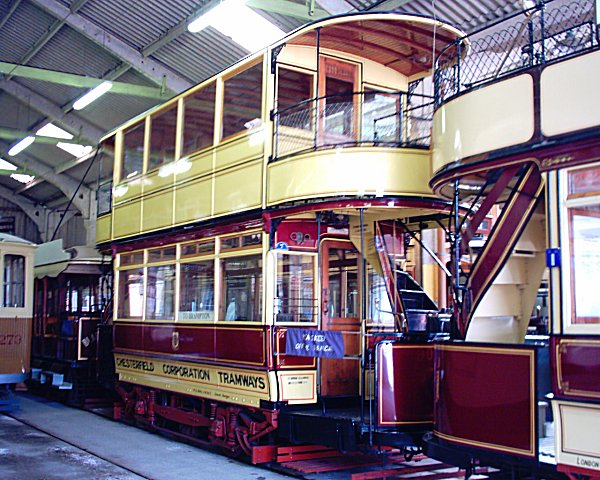
Chesterfield tramcar 7 at the National Tramway Museum.

Car numbers	Type (as built)	Year built	Builder	Seats	Truck	Motors	Controllers
1-12	Open top	1904	Ashbury	22/34	Brush	Westinghouse 90M	2x25hp
13-14	Open top	1907	Ashbury	22/34	Brush	Westinghouse 90M	2x25hp
15	Water car	1909	Milnes		Brush	Westinghouse 90M	2x25hp
16-18	Balcony	1914	Milnes	22/34	Peckham P22	Westinghouse T1	2x25hp

Several cars were damaged when a fire broke out at the depot on 20 October 1916. Car number 8 and one of the three cars bought in 1914 were scrapped because they were too damaged to be repaired. They were replaced by two additional trams obtained in 1920, although details of them are sketchy. Seven of the open topped vehicles were fitted with top covers in 1920.

== Bibliography ==
- Turner, Keith (1996). The Directory of British Tramways. Patrick Stephens. ISBN 978-1-85260-549-0.
