= Lord Baltimore (streetcar truck) =

1896 design of electric streetcar

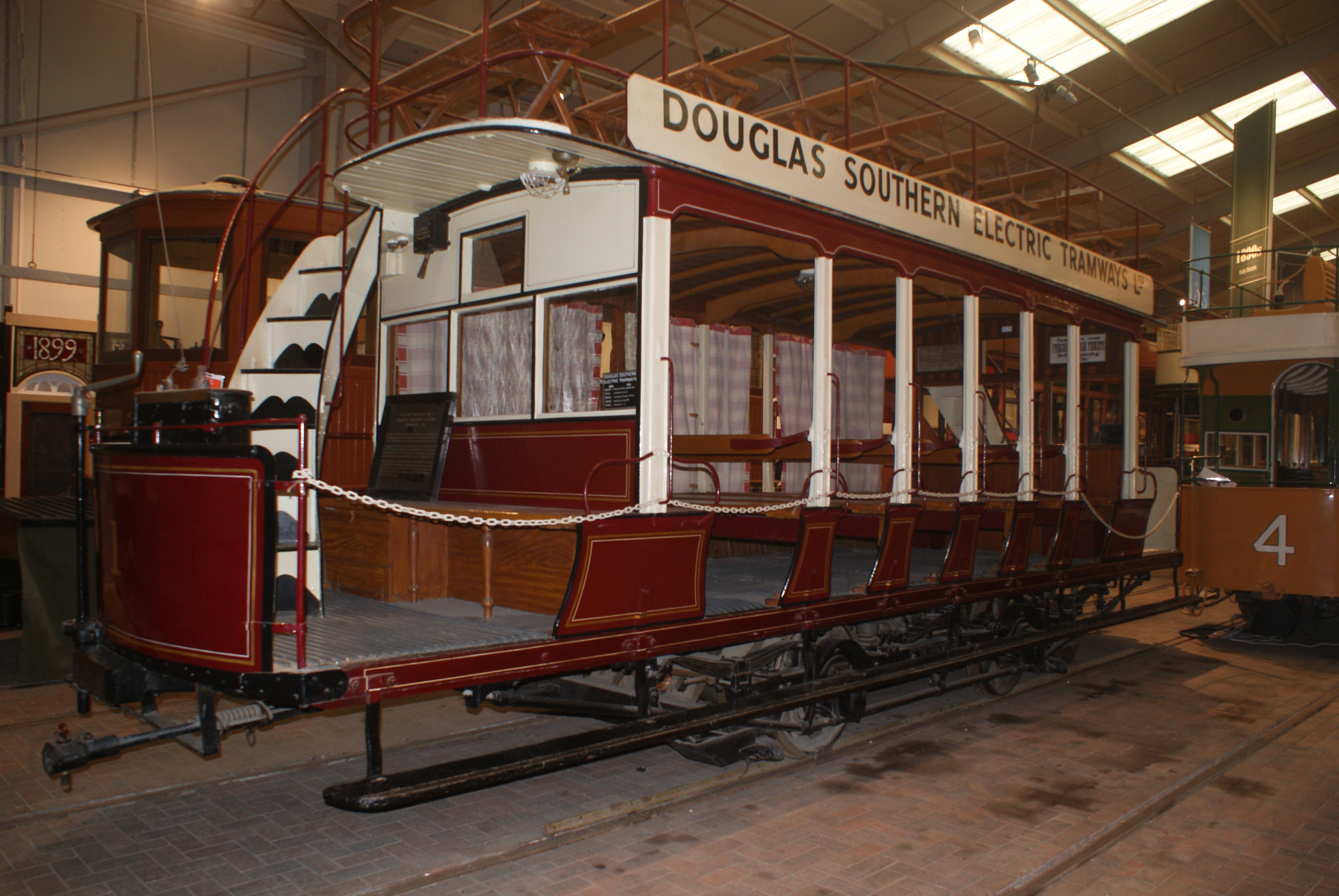
The Lord Baltimore truck on Douglas Southern Electric Tramway No. 1

The Lord Baltimore was a design of electric streetcar truck dating from in 1896. It was built by the Baltimore Car Wheel Company of Baltimore in the US state of Maryland. It is easily identified by the Lord Baltimore lettering on the truck's side frames.

The truck was used on a number of streetcars in the United States, and the Baltimore Streetcar Museum now own several examples. At least one was exported and fitted to cars of the Douglas Southern Electric Tramway on the Isle of Man. That line's car no. 1 and its truck are now preserved and displayed at the UK's National Tramway Museum in Crich, Derbyshire.
