= Feltham Tram =

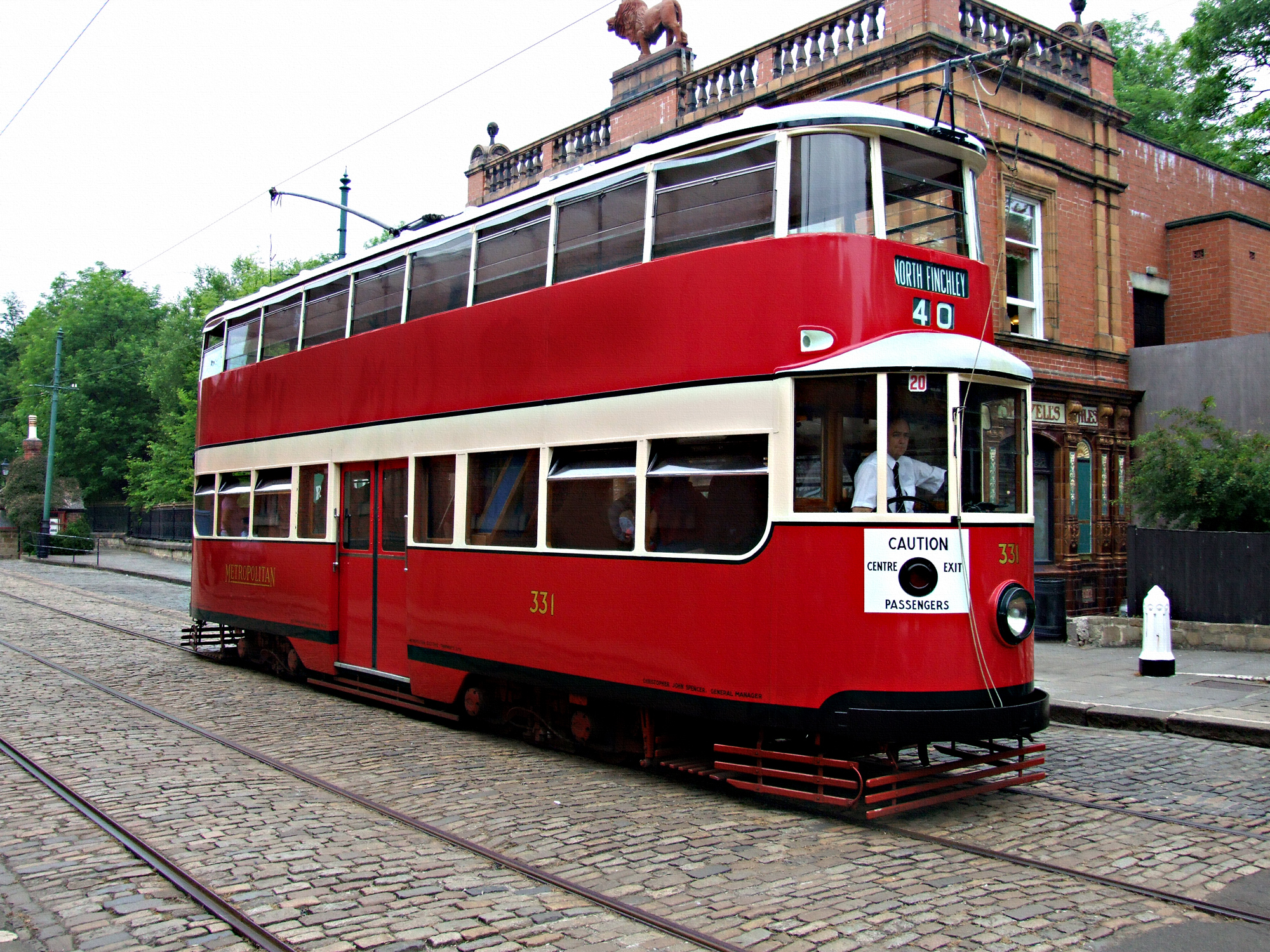
Preserved Feltham 331 in the National Tramway Museum at Crich, England.

Feltham Trams are a series of four-axis trams. This was the last design introduced on London's original tram network, in use from 1931 until the network's closure in 1952.

== Development ==
In 1929 the Metropolitan Electric Tramways (MET) placed into service an experimental tramcar, No. 320, manufactured by the Union Construction Company which was located in Feltham. This tram was of a significantly more advanced design than other experimental cars that the MET had trialled in the previous few years, and was the first of three prototypes that led to the final design of what became known as the "Feltham" trams. Two more experimental tramcars were then constructed: MET No. 330 later the same year, and No. 331 the next. After experience in passenger service was assessed, the best features of each were combined to form the final design.

== Features and characteristics ==
In 1932 these were the most modern tramcars in London, with their streamlined appearance and high-horsepower motors they were fast, and seated 64 passengers in comfort – with capacity for another 20 standing on the vestibuled end platforms to cope with rush-hour crowds. The drivers cabins were raised above the passenger saloon floor level, so that the seated driver was at the same height as standing drivers on older trams. Unusually for London, air brakes were fitted, as well as a pneumatically operated front exit door.

== Stock ==
One hundred production Feltham trams were built in total, 54 for the MET and 46 for London United Tramways (LUT), entering service from 1931. Although substantially the same trams, the LUT Felthams were fitted with different electrical equipment to the MET cars, and lacked plough carriers (required for through services with London County Council Tramways).

All 100 Felthams (and three prototypes) passed to London Transport in 1933. Following closure of their (home) North London tramlines upon conversion to trolleybus operation, all surviving cars were transferred to South London, with the former LUT trams being fitted with plough carriers; most survived almost until the final round of closures of London tramlines (Operation Tramaway, 1950–1952). Starting in 1949, 90 Felthams were sold for further service in Leeds. Unlike the London Transport renumbering, that in Leeds was not sequential.

The experimental prototypes did not fare so well, being of non-standard design and two with non-standard equipment, causing maintenance problems and operational difficulties; No. 320 was scrapped in 1935 after a very short service life; No. 331 was withdrawn in 1936 but was sold to Sunderland where it saw further service until 1954; however No. 330, being the most "standard" of the three, managed to be transferred to South London with the production Felthams.

MET Number	LUT Number	LPTB Number	Comments
319	-	2066	Out-of-sequence fleet number due to filling a gap left by the sale of experimental tramcar "Poppy" to LUT.
320	-	2166	Experimental Prototype: Equal-Wheel bogies, 4-motors, Low driving cabins.
321 to 329	-	2067 to 2075	Standard production Feltham tramcars
330	-	2167	Experimental Prototype: Pay-As-You-Enter (later removed), Low driving cabins.
331	-	2168	Experimental Prototype: Centre entrance PAYE, Equal-Wheel bogies, 4-motors, Raised driving cabins.
332 to 375	-	2076 to 2119	Standard production Feltham tramcars
-	351 to 396	2120 to 2165	Standard production Feltham tramcars

== In Preservation ==
Three Feltham cars have survived to the present day, all ex-Metropolitan Electric Tramways.

Image	MET Number	LPTB Number	Current Location	Status	Comments
	331	2168	National Tramway Museum, Crich, UK	Operational	Centre entrance prototype 'Cissie'. Later Sunderland 100.
-	341	2085	Seashore Trolley Museum, Maine, USA	Awaiting Restoration	Later Leeds 526.
	355	2099	London Transport Museum Store, Acton, London, UK	Static Display	Later Leeds 501.
