= Union Construction Company =

The Union Construction Company (UCC) was a company set up in 1901 and associated with Charles Yerkes, an American associated with the London Underground at that time. It was part of the Underground Electric Railways Company of London (prior to the creation of London Transport in 1933) and was based in Feltham, Middlesex, England.

It stayed moribund until about 1925, and was then activated to renovate trains running on what is now the Central line and, following on from this, it built new London Underground Standard Stock in 1927. It also began a major tram-rebuilding programme for the Metropolitan Electric Tramways (MET).

It became a 'shell' company in 1929, was renamed The Union & Finance Construction Co. Ltd., then built some experimental tramcars for the MET in 1929 & 1930. These became the forerunners of a fleet of 100 double-deck tramcars for London United Tramways (LUT) and MET, well known as the Feltham Tram.

It also built 35 Class A1 and 25 Class A2 trolleybuses for LUT to replace trams in the Kingston area. These bore more than a passing resemblance to the 'Feltham' trams from the front.

In 1933 the London Passenger Transport Board (better known as London Transport) was created by Act of Parliament. The Board was prohibited from directly manufacturing its own vehicles, leading to the demise of the UCC and the placing of all future orders with companies such as Metro-Cammell.
