= Blackpool Electric Tramway Company =

English tram company

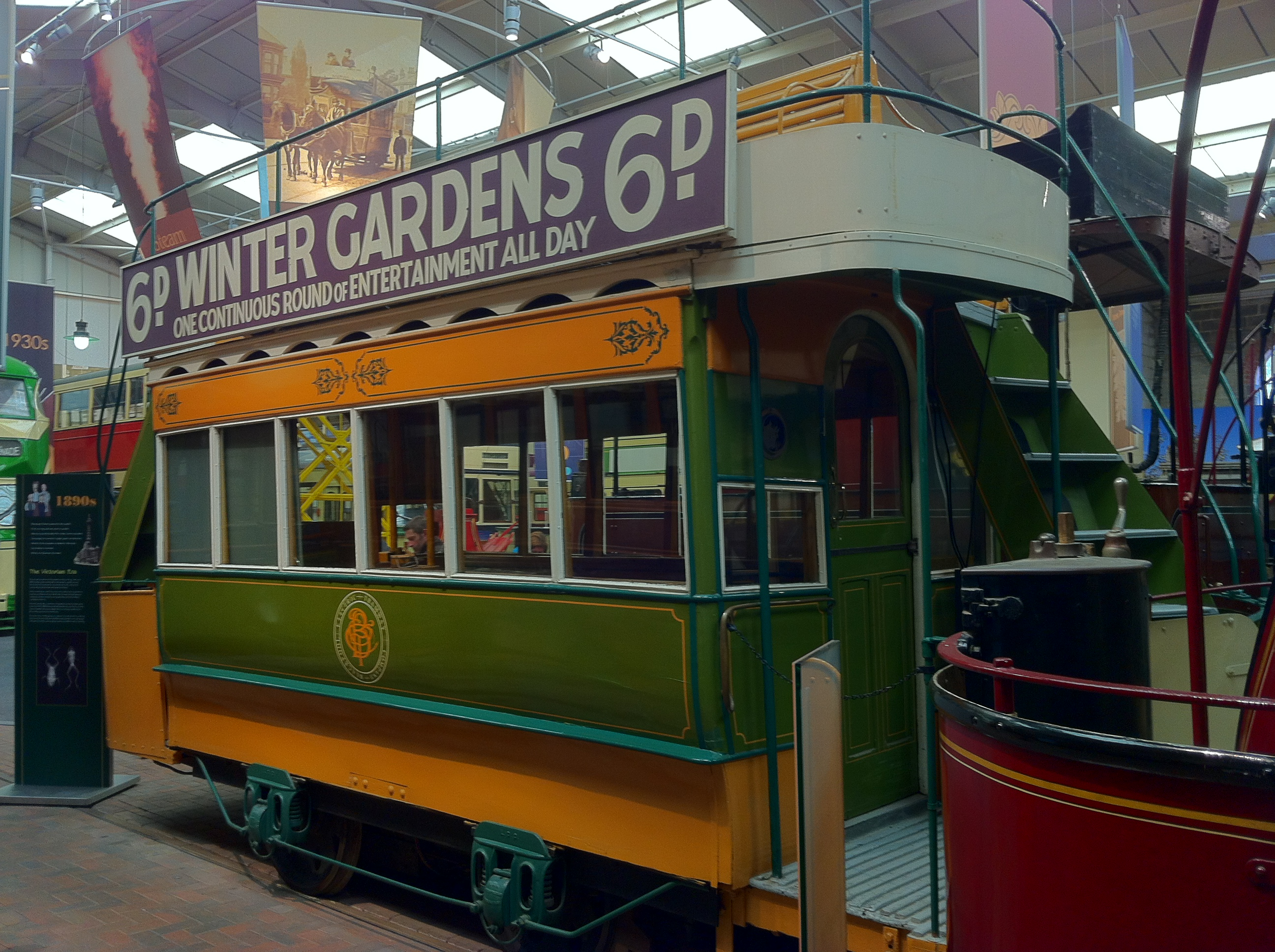
- Car No. 4 at the National Tramway Museum

Operation
- Locale: Blackpool
- Open: 29 September 1885
- Close: 10 September 1892
- Status: Closed

Infrastructure
- Track gauge: 1,435 mm (4 ft 8 1/2 in)
- Propulsion system: Conduit electric
- Depot: Blundell Street

Statistics
- Route length: 1 mile (1.6 km)

Blackpool Electric Tramway Company operated a tramway service in Blackpool between 1885 and 1893. It was the first electric tramway in England.

== History ==
On 3 December 1884, Blackpool Corporation agreed to use Michael Holroyd Smith's conduit tramway and granted him a seven-year concession.

The Blackpool Electric Tramway Company was formed in January 1885, and set up with capital of £30,000 (equivalent to £3,333,011 in 2025). The first rail was laid in March and the first test runs were made on 29 June. The tramway was officially opened on 29 September 1885. The chairman of the company was Alderman Richard Horsfall. The location caused many problems for the conduit system and the company employed horses to pull trams when the track was flooded.

With further extensions, the line ran from Cocker Street to Dean Street near South Pier and from Manchester Square along Lytham Road.

The tramway was a financial success. In 1890 the profits of the year were £2,983 (equivalent to £331,412 in 2025), out of which a dividend of 7 per cent was paid.

== Closure ==
When the lease expired, the corporation took over the tramway on 18 September 1893, and it continued as Blackpool Corporation Tramway. The Blackpool Electric Tramway Company was wound up.

Car 4 survived and is preserved at the National Tramway Museum in Crich, Derbyshire.
