= Blackpool and Fleetwood Tramroad =

English tramway company, 1898–1920

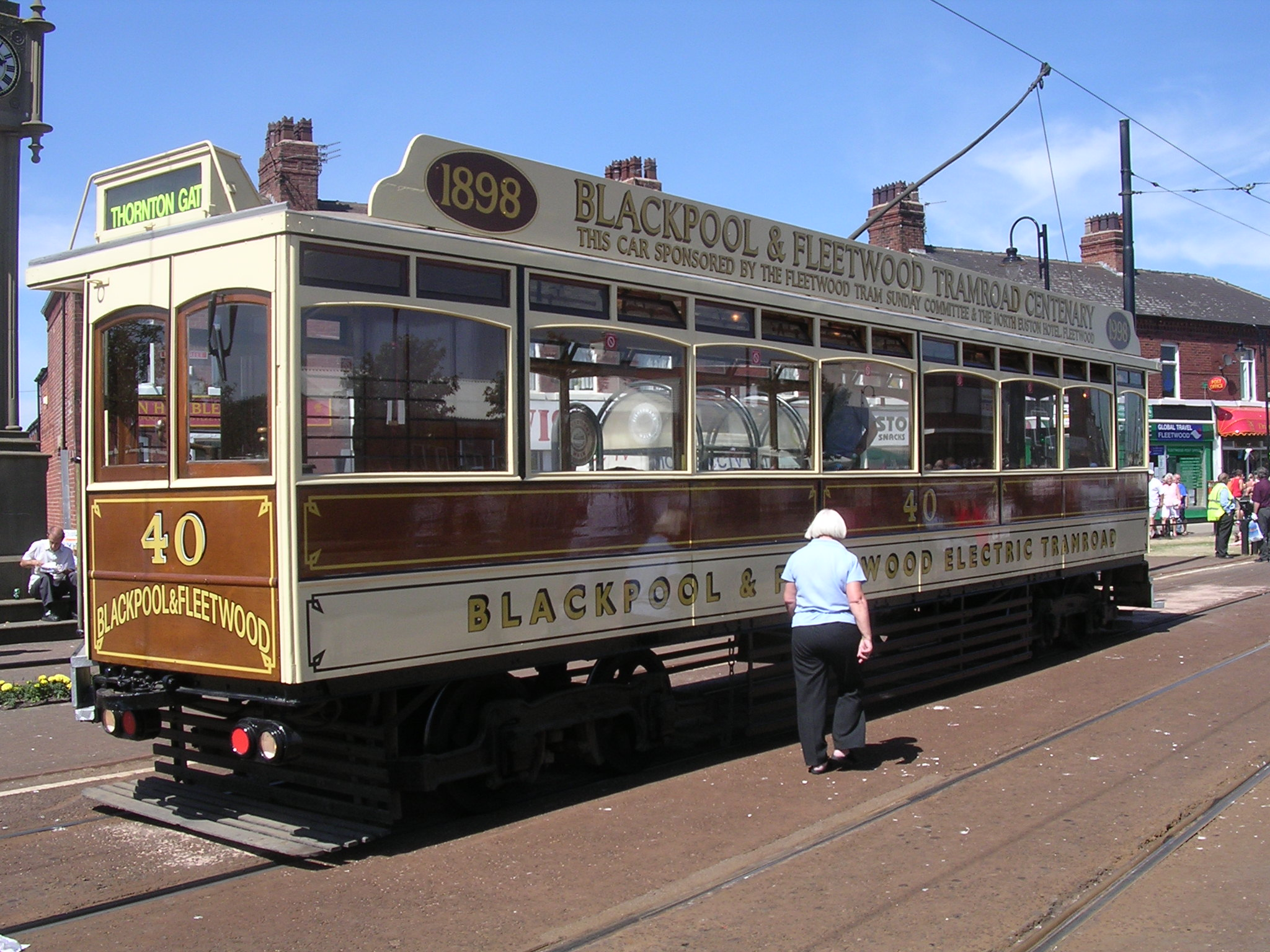
- Blackpool and Fleetwood Tramroad Box car 40 on the Blackpool Tramway

Operation
- Locale: Blackpool, Fleetwood
- Open: 14 July 1898
- Close: 1 January 1920
- Status: Taken over by Blackpool Corporation Tramways

Infrastructure
- Track gauge: 1,435 mm (4 ft 8 1/2 in)
- Propulsion system: Electric

Statistics
- Route length: 8.21 miles (13.21 km)

The Blackpool and Fleetwood Tramroad operated a tramway service between Blackpool and Fleetwood from 1898 to 1920.

== History ==
Blackpool and Fleetwood Tramroad Act 1896
- Act of Parliament
- Parliament of the United Kingdom
- Long title: An Act for incorporating the Blackpool and Fleetwood Tramroads Company and empowering them to construct a Tramroad and Tramway between Blackpool and Fleetwood and for other purposes.
- Citation: 59 & 60 Vict. c. cxlvii

Dates
- Royal assent: 20 July 1896

Other legislation
- Repealed by: County of Lancashire Act 1984

Status: Repealed

Text of statute as originally enacted

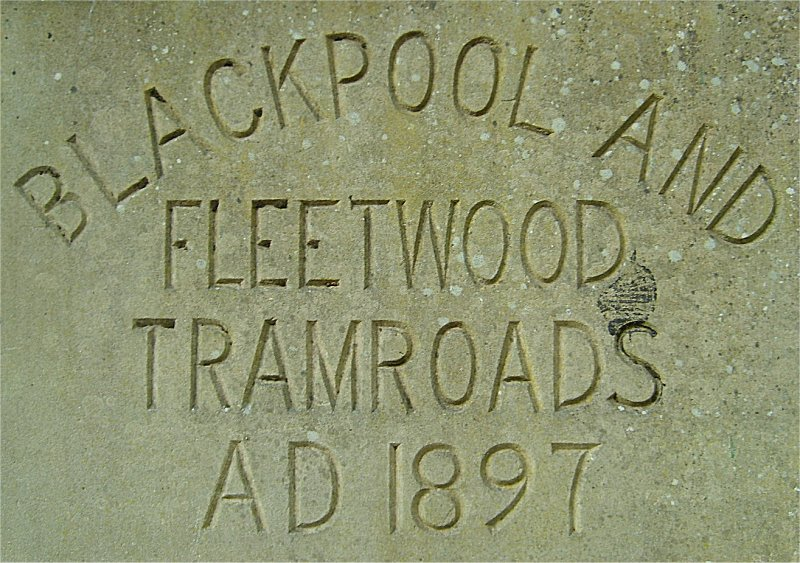
Bispham depot headstone at the National Tramway Museum

The tramway was authorised by the Blackpool and Fleetwood Tramroad Act 1896 (59 & 60 Vict. c. cxlvii). Construction of the tramway began in 1897. Within Blackpool, the tracks were constructed by the corporation, and services started on 14 July 1898.

== Tram depots ==
There were three depots:

- Copse Road Depot in Fleetwood was built in 1897 with six tracks and a capacity of 18 trams. It was used as a store and service depot. After passing to Blackpool Corporation Tramways in 1920, it was used to dismantle trams. Between 1925 and 1949 a line connected the depot with the railway and was used to shunt wagons. After Blackpool Corporation sold the depot, it was used as a car showroom. The substation still fed the Fleetwood line section of the Blackpool Tramway during this time. The depot was demolished in 2016 after a scheme to convert the building into a tram museum failed, due to the poor condition of the building.
- Bispham Depot in Blackpool was built in 1898 and extended in 1914 to have six tracks and a capacity of 36 trams. A substation was built to the side of the depot. The depot was used to receive Blackpool Corporation Pantograph cars in 1928 and Brush Railcoach cars in 1940. It closed on 27 October 1963 and was used as a store until the mid-1970s. It was demolished to make way for a Sainsbury's supermarket and the depot's headstone was installed at the National Tramway Museum in Crich.
- Bold Street Depot in Fleetwood opened in January 1899 with two tracks and a capacity of 4 trams. It was used only by the last two trams to Fleetwood in the evening and the first two trams in the morning. After Blackpool Corporation took over the tramroad in 1920, the depot was closed. Wires were taken down in 1924 when the Fleetwood loop was built. After World War II the depot was used by Fisherman's Friend. It was demolished in 1973 to make way for flats.

== Tramcar fleet ==
The company had a fleet of 41 tramcars in a brown and cream livery.

=== Crossbench Rack cars ===
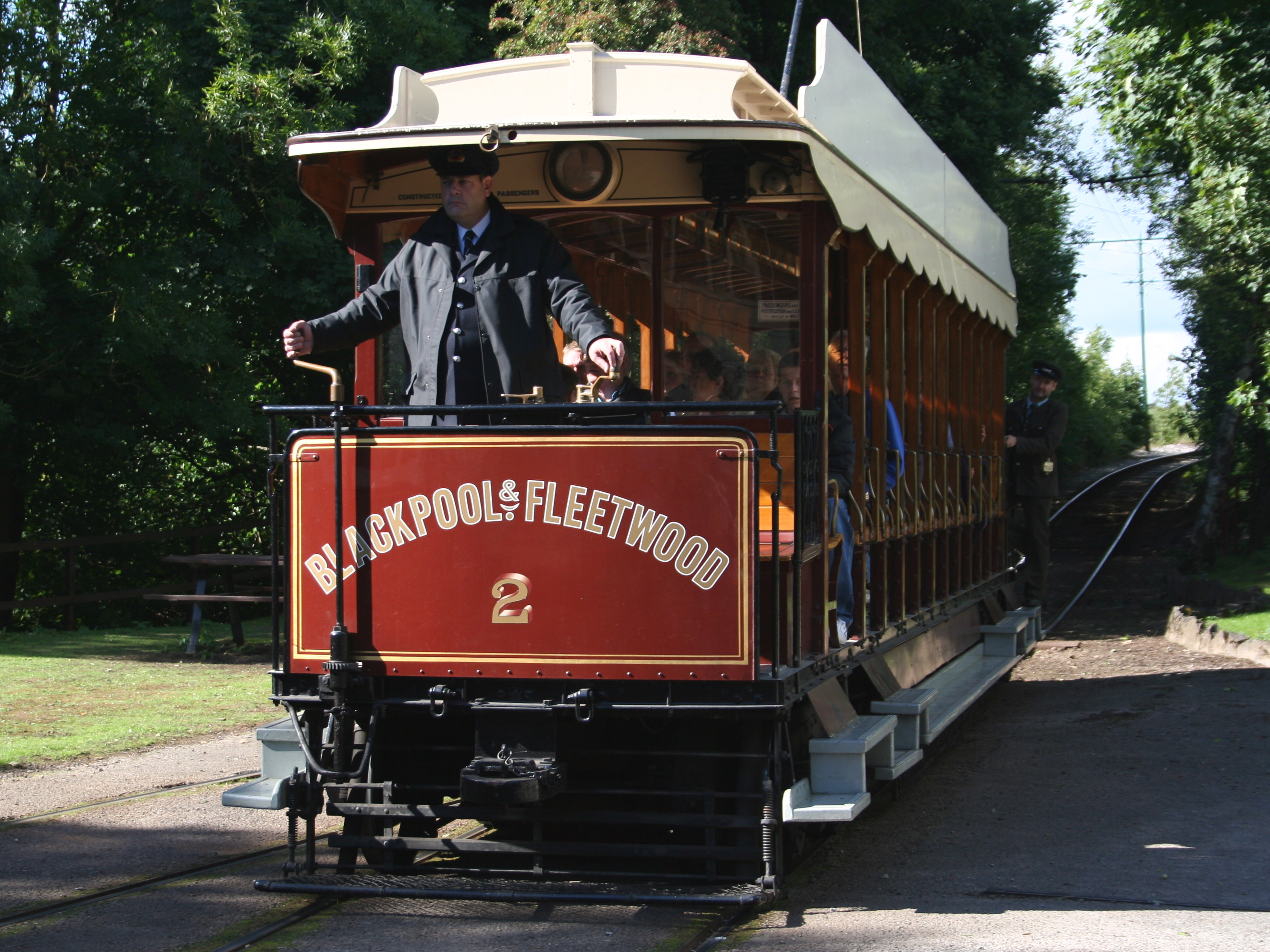
Crossbench Rack car No. 2

The Crossbench Rack cars were 16 open-sided trams built between 1898 and 1899 by G.F. Milnes. They were originally numbered 1–13 and 25–27 in the Blackpool and Fleetwood Tramroad fleet, before being renumbered 126–141 after being purchased by Blackpool Corporation Transport in 1920. The Crossbench Rack cars were 1–10 (126–135) and 25–27 (139–141) and the trailer cars were 11–13 (136–138). The trailer cars were later converted to motor cars. Rack car No. 2 (127) is preserved by the National Tramway Museum in Crich, Derbyshire.

=== Box cars ===
The Box cars were 15 trams built between 1898 and 1914 by G.F. Milnes. They were originally numbered 14–24 and 38–41 in the Blackpool and Fleetwood Tramroad fleet, before being renumbered 101–115 after being purchased by Blackpool Corporation Transport in 1920. Box cars 20–24 became 101–105, Box cars 14–19 became 106–111 and Box cars 38–41 became 112–115. The last four cars were built without clerestory roofs and were known as New Fleetwood Box cars. Box car No. 40 (114) is preserved by the National Tramway Museum in Crich.

=== Yankee cars ===
The Yankee cars were 7 partially open-sided combination trams built in 1899 by the Electric Railway and Tram Carriage Works (ER&TCW). They were originally numbered 28–34 in the Blackpool and Fleetwood Tramroad fleet, before being renumbered 116–122 after being purchased by Blackpool Corporation Transport in 1920. Apart from No. 30 (118), they were rebuilt with enclosed saloons between 1920–1921 and became known as Greenhouse cars and Glasshouse cars.

=== Vanguard cars ===
The Vanguard cars were 3 trams built in 1910 by United Electric Car Company. They were originally numbered 35–37 in the Blackpool and Fleetwood Tramroad fleet, before being renumbered 123–125 after being purchased by Blackpool Corporation Transport in 1920. Blackpool Corporations' OMO car No. 7 was rebuilt as a replica Vanguard car in 1987 and was renumbered 619, its previous number when it was a Blackpool Corporation English Electric Railcoach prior to its rebuild as an OMO car. It is preserved by the Heaton Park Tramway in Manchester.

== Merger and legacy ==
The Blackpool and Fleetwood Tramroad was taken over by Blackpool Corporation Tramways on 1 January 1920 at a cost of £284,000 (equivalent to £10,974,784 in 2025). Two tramcars survive, both in the National Tramway Museum collection. Rack No. 2, built in 1898, is on display at the National Tramway Museum in Crich, Derbyshire. Box No. 40 built in 1914 is operational at the same museum. In addition, Replica Vanguard No. 619 from the Blackpool Tramway, rebuilt in 1987, is in the Heaton Park Tramway collection.
