= Metropolitan Electric Tramways =

English electric tram network (1904-33)

Operation
- Locale: London
- Open: 1904
- Status: Defunct

Infrastructure
- Propulsion system: Electric
- Stock: 316

Metropolitan Electric Tramways Limited (MET) operated electric tram services in suburban areas of Middlesex and Hertfordshire from 1904 to 1933, when its services passed to the London Passenger Transport Board.

== History ==
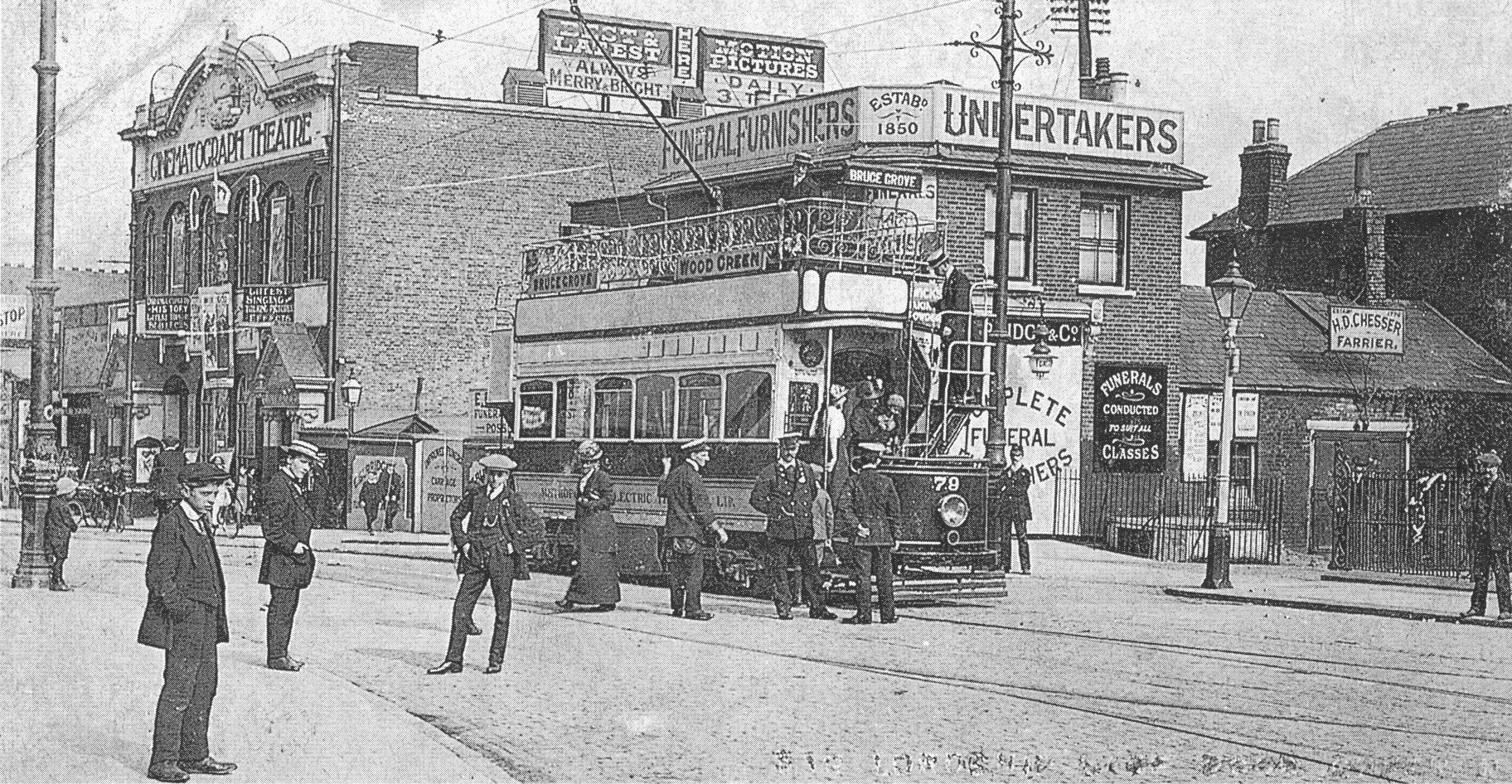
MET A class tram No.79 in Lordship Lane, Haringey, 1913

The company originated in 1894 as the Metropolitan Tramways and Omnibus Company Limited. The company hoped to construct horse tramways in the northern suburbs of London. The proposed tramways were not built, but an agreement was entered into with Middlesex County Council to operate the tramway network it was constructing under the Light Railways Act 1896. The company was acquired by British Electric Traction (BET) in 1901, and its name changed to Metropolitan Electric Tramways Ltd. (MET).

The first section of line was opened on 22 July 1904, with services from Finsbury Park to Manor House (where a connection with the London County Council Tramways was made) and Wood Green. On 3 December a separate section from Cricklewood to Edgware via Hendon opened.

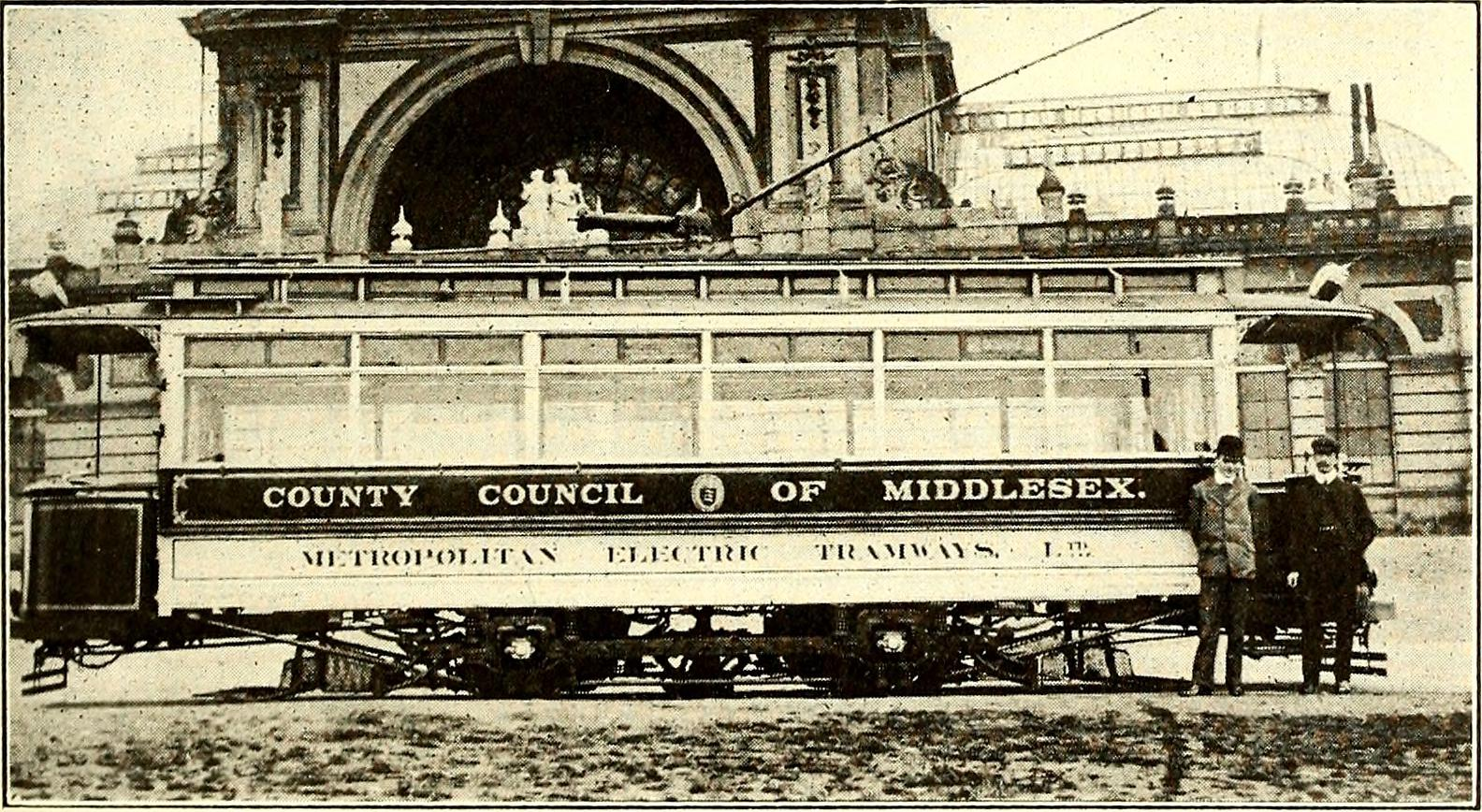
MET E class single-deck tram at Alexandra Palace

The network was rapidly expanded between 1905 and 1911, MET having gained powers to build its own lines as well as operating those constructed by the county council, and by the acquisition and electrification of the North Metropolitan Tramways Company's steam-operated line from Wood Green to Ponders End.

The MET operated London's only regular single-deck electric tram services, on two tram lines serving Alexandra Palace. The first line ran from Turnpike Lane, approaching the Palace from the West via Muswell Hill, and was opened in late 1905; the second line opened a few months later in 1906, and started from Wood Green, entering the Palace grounds from the East.

On 1 January 1913, MET became a subsidiary of the London and Suburban Traction Company (LSTC), jointly owned by BET and the Underground Group. LSTC also owned the two other company-operated tramways in London, London United Tramways (LUT) and South Metropolitan Electric Tramways (SouthMET).

When MET was taken over by the London Passenger Transport Board on 1 July 1933, it was operating 53.51 miles (86.12 km) of route. At that time, company owned 316 tramcars, and 9.38 miles (15.10 km) of track, with the remainder being leased from Middlesex or Hertfordshire County Councils.

The outer termini of the MET network were Acton (where it connected with the LUT system), Sudbury, Canons Park, Barnet, Enfield and Waltham Cross. Joint-running with the LUT and London County Council systems brought MET trams into Central and West London.

== Tramcars ==
Fleet Nº	Class	Year Built	Body Type	Comments					
Fleet Nº	Class	Year Built	Body Type	Comments	1 to 70	B	1904–05	reversed Maximum Traction bogie, open-top double-deck	16 cars received covered tops and reclassified B/2, 1928–29
71 to 130	A	1904–05	reversed Maximum Traction bogie, open-top double-deck	all cars received covered tops, 1928–29. The body of Car 94 was acquired by a group of enthusiasts in 1961, after spending the years since its withdrawal in 1935 as a garden shed at Waltham Cross. Claude Lane allowed the group to keep it at his Eastbourne Tramway, where the initial intention was to restore it to its original condition, but this plan foundered for lack of a permanent site, so Claude Lane took ownership with a plan to convert it to a narrow gauge single deck saloon car for his new project, Seaton Tramway. The move to Seaton delayed the restoration for many years, but it was finally launched into service as Seaton car 14 in 1984, where it still operates in regular service.					
131 to 150	E	1905	single truck, single-deck saloon	135, 136, 143, and 144 sold to Auckland (NZ); 132 transferred to LUT (class S/1, No 341)					
191	D/1	1905	single truck, open-top double-deck						
166 to 190	D	1906	single truck, open-top double-deck						
151 to 165	C	1907	reversed Maximum Traction bogie, open-top double-deck	all cars received covered tops and reclassified C/2, 1914–15					
192 to 211	C/1	1908	reversed Maximum Traction bogie, open-top double-deck	all cars received covered tops, 1929					
212 to 216	F	1908	Maximum Traction bogie, open-top double-deck						
217 to 236, 317	G	1909/21	Maximum Traction bogie, open-top double-deck	all cars received covered tops, 1929					
237 to 316	H	1909–12	Maximum Traction bogie, open-top double-deck	2, 12, 22, 31, 46, and 82 were rebuilt to this body style					
318	"Bluebell"	1926	Maximum Traction bogie, totally enclosed double-deck	Experimental					
319	"Poppy"	1927	Maximum Traction bogie, totally enclosed double-deck	Experimental, sold to LUT (November 1927), renumbered 350					
320	UCC (Feltham)	1929	Equal-wheel bogie, totally enclosed double-deck	Experimental, equal-wheel bogies with four motors					
330	UCC (Feltham)	1929	Maximum Traction bogie, totally enclosed double-deck	Experimental, Pay-As-You-Enter fare system					
331	UCC (Feltham)	1930	Maximum Traction bogie, totally enclosed double-deck	Experimental, centre entrance; preserved in operating condition at Crich as MET 331					
319, 321 to 329, 332 to 375	UCC (Feltham)	1931	Maximum Traction bogie, totally enclosed double-deck	No. 355 is preserved as a static exhibit (in 1930s MET livery) at the London Transport Museum's depot in Acton					

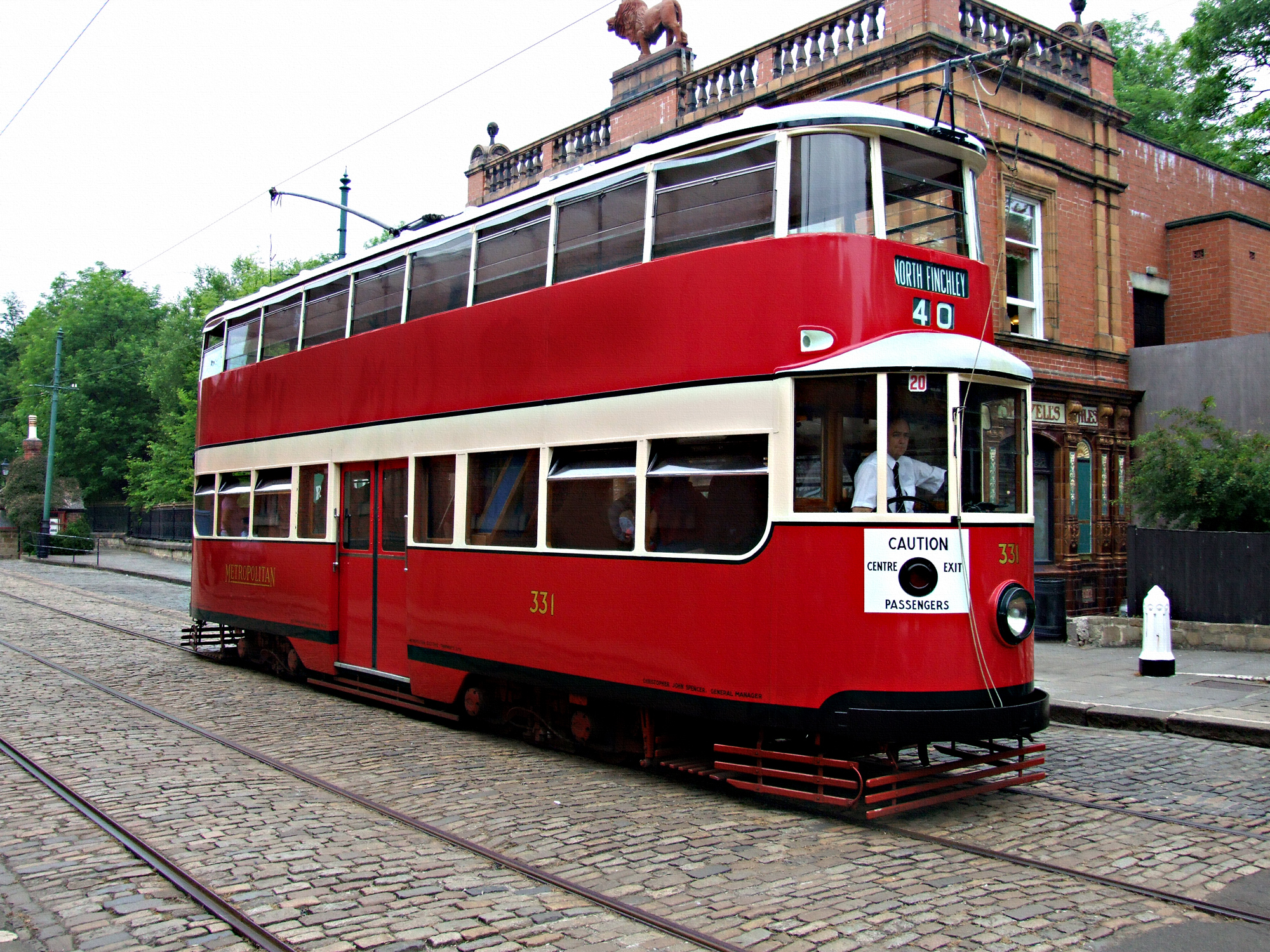
MET experimental centre-entrance Feltham tram No.331, running at Crich, July 2009

Not all trams survived into London Transport ownership, and many that did were withdrawn before receiving their new LT numbers.

Many of the modern UCC (Feltham) tramcars were sold for further service in Leeds (331 going to Sunderland), lasting until the late 1950s.

== Sources ==
- Day, John R. (1979). London's Trams and Trolleybuses. London Transport.
- Hibbs, John (1979). The History of British Bus Services (Second ed.). Newton Abbot.
- Gibbs, T.A. (1962). The Metropolitan Electric Tramways, a Short History. The Light Rail Railway Society.
- Smeeton, C.S. (1984). The Metropolitan Electric Tramways, Vol.1 – Origins to 1920. The Light Rail Transit Association.
- Smeeton, C.S. (1986). The Metropolitan Electric Tramways, Vol.2 – 1921 to 1933. The Light Rail Transit Association.
