= Michael Holroyd Smith =

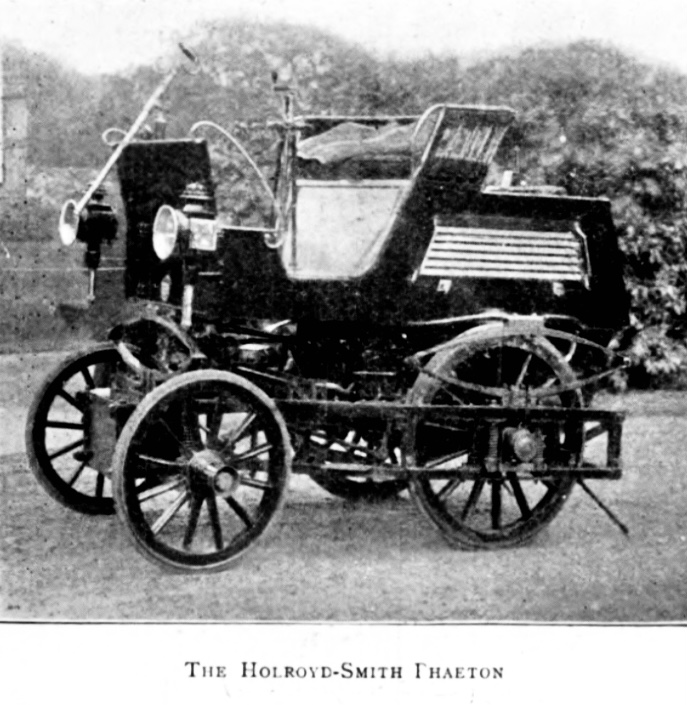
Holroyd Smith (1897)

Michael Holroyd Smith (1847–1932) was an English pioneer of electrical and motor car engineering. He was born in Halifax on 22 December 1847, the son of Matthew Smith and his wife Mary Sutcliffe. Over his life he worked on various projects as a consulting engineer. In 1885 he was responsible for the design and construction of the Blackpool Electric Tramway, a line in Blackpool that was Britain's first electric tramway and survives to this day, albeit in a rather different form. Between 1886 and 1890, he was responsible for the electrification of the City and South London Railway, the first deep-level tube railway in London. In the 1890s, he built at least two motor cars of his own design, though these do not appear to have gone into production. He died at his home in Llanrwst, Denbighshire on 6 July 1932.

Michael Holroyd Smith was a member of both the Institution of Electrical Engineers and the Institution of Mechanical Engineers.
