= Port Soderick =

Coordinates: 54.1226°N 4.5324°W

Port Soderick: Manx: Purt Soderick
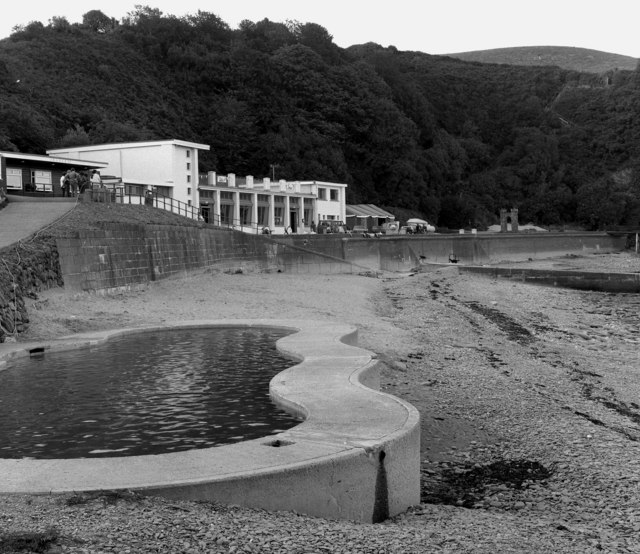
- Paddling pool and arcade (1993)

- Location within the Isle of Man
- OS grid reference: SC346726
- Parish: Braddan
- Sheading: Middle
- Crown dependency: Isle of Man
- Post town: ISLE OF MAN
- Postcode district: IM4
- Dialling code: 01624
- Police: Isle of Man
- Fire: Isle of Man
- Ambulance: Isle of Man
- House of Keys: Middle

Port Soderick (Manx: Purt Soderick) is a small hamlet to the south of Douglas, capital of the Isle of Man, once famed for its pleasure grounds and beach. In later years there have been various attempts to rejuvenate the area, all of which have been unsuccessful to date. It still has a station on the steam railway.

The beach area had its own small promenade and hotel (later named "The Anchor" but now closed and abandoned), a suspended walkway (now closed and deemed unsafe), former oyster beds, and a sea lion pool, a large building formerly housing an amusement arcade, paddling pool (long since filled in by shingle from the incoming tide), and access to the nearby glen of the same name. These days the place is something of a ghost town, disturbed only by the occasional dog walker, but it once had its own funicular railway linking the sea level resort with the Douglas Head Marine Drive Railway atop the cliffs above, the remnants of which can still be traced today.

== Former leisure facility ==
The entire site was purchased in the 1990s by Pacini Ltd (a subsidiary of De Beers) and the land was leased to Port Soderick Leisure Ltd, a company established by Andrew Evans of Douglas, with the sole purpose of rebuilding much of the site and operating a water sports facility there: primarily scuba diving, sailing, canoeing and jet ski rentals.

The original building was gutted except for the original sprung dance floor, and was converted for the most part into the Anchor pub. The centre opened with much support from local people, and was very popular during the summer. Pacini had however inadvertently leased the small wooden cafe on the site to a separate party who enforced their contract to be the sole supplier of food to the area. Thus robbed of the lucrative profits from food as alcohol consumption fell due to social concerns, the centre's financial viability was stretched. Pacini decided to pull all future funding; this resulted in the lease being given up and control handed to the cafe proprietor, who abandoned the water sports and ran the pub for a short while before closing its doors for good.

The site has limitations mainly associated with decay of the building structures due to lack of maintenance and vandalism and the general deterioration of the old coastal walkways. In addition there is no sewer connection at the site and the sea outfall has long been destroyed.

== Notable people ==
- Hazel Hannan, politician, born in Port Soderick
- Pierre Novellie, comedian, grew up in Port Soderick

== See also ==
- Douglas Head Marine Drive Railway
- Isle of Man Railway stations
- Douglas, Isle of Man
