= Douglas Southern Electric Tramway =

Tramway on the Isle of Man

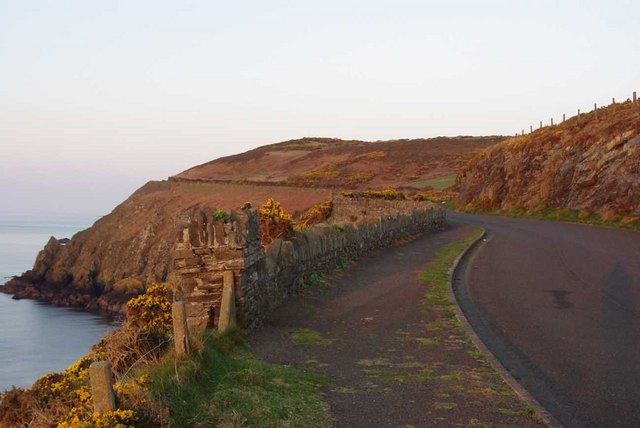
- The course of the tramway
- Locale: Douglas, Isle of Man
- Terminus: Port Soderick

Commercial operations
- Name: Douglas Southern Electric Tramway
- Original gauge: 1,435 mm (4 ft 8 1/2 in)

Preserved operations
- Operated by: Douglas Southern Electric Tramways Co., Ltd.
- Stations: 4 (Plus Loops)
- Length: 4.5 miles (7.2 km)

Commercial history
- Opened: 7 August 1896
- Closed: 28 August 1939
Route map
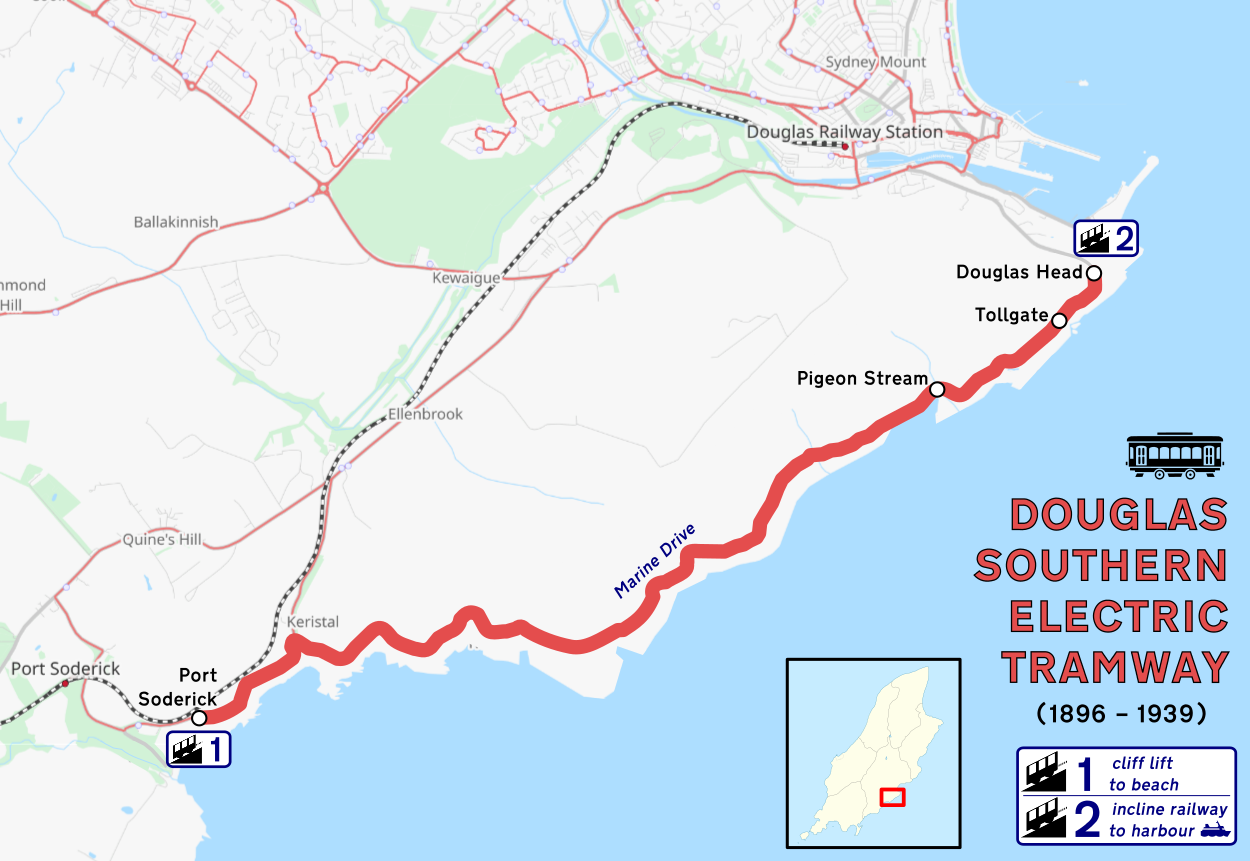
(Click to expand)

Douglas Southern Electric Tramway was a standard gauge tramway between the top of Douglas Head on the Isle of Man and the nearby resort of Port Soderick.

== Route ==
The route ran along from the Douglas Head end of the Marine Drive atop the cliffs and crossed a number of viaducts and bridges. The tram line was 3.5 miles (5.6 km) long, and was single track with passing places. All stops were on the seaward side of the track, and cars only had doors on that side. At each end of the route short inclined railways carried passengers to and from the termini.

== History ==
=== 1896–1926 ===
The tramway was opened in 1896 by the New General Traction Company. Initially the tramway company was a separate entity from the Douglas Head Marine Drive Company, which owned the roadway and received a payment of one penny per passenger together with a share of the takings. When the franchise to operate the tramway expired in 1926, however, the two companies amalgamated under the title of the Douglas Head Marine Drive Company Ltd.

=== 1926–1939 ===
Operation was suspended at the outbreak of both the First World War and the Second World War. Activity was resumed after the end of the First World War, but the line never reopened after the Second World War, and it was largely lifted and destroyed by 1955.

== Fleet ==
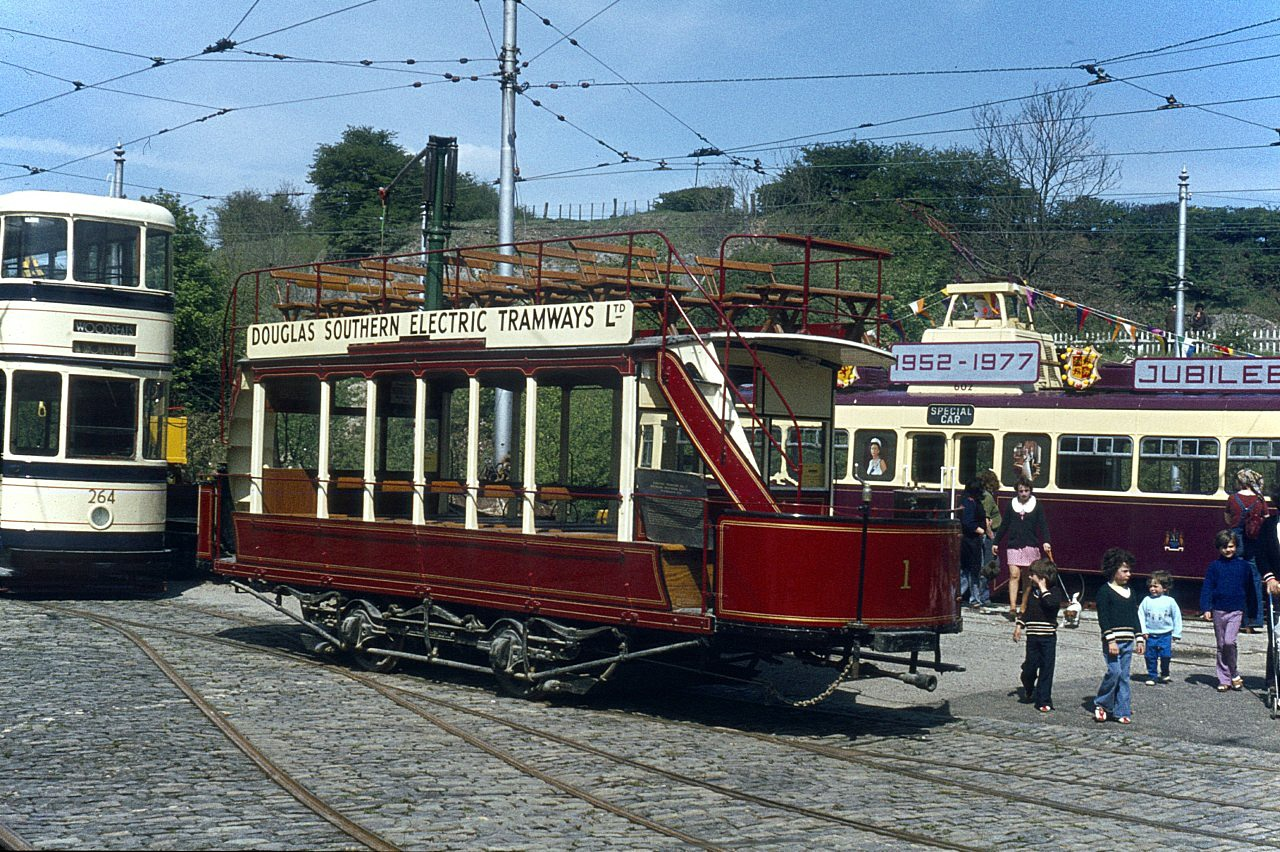
No.1 Preserved Crich Tramway Village

At its peak, the line was operated by a fleet of eight motor cars and an identical number of trailers, all of which were double deckers and very similar in appearance. They wore a standard livery of maroon dash and side panels complete with gold trim and fleet lettering front and rear, with white uprights, varnished toastrack and knifeboard seats and the lettering of the company across longitudinal; boards on each side; it is in this guise that the sole remaining car is preserved today, complete with characteristic striped curtains. The colour scheme appears to have remained largely unchanged throughout the lifespan of the tramway.

Key:	Scrapped	Preserved

=== Motors ===
No.	Built	Layout	Seats	Builders	Status
1	1896	Double Deck	75	Brush (Lougborough)	Preserved
2	1896	Double Deck	75	Brush (Lougborough)	Scrapped
3	1896	Double Deck	75	Brush (Lougborough)	Scrapped
4	1896	Double Deck	75	Brush (Lougborough)	Scrapped
5	1896	Double Deck	75	Brush (Lougborough)	Scrapped
6	1896	Double Deck	75	Brush (Lougborough)	Scrapped
7	1896	Double Deck	75	Brush (Lougborough)	Scrapped
8	1896	Double Deck	75	Brush (Lougborough)	Scrapped

=== Trailers ===
No.	Built	Layout	Seats	Builders	Status
9	1896	Double Deck	75	Brush (Lougborough)	Scrapped
10	1896	Double Deck	75	Brush (Lougborough)	Scrapped
11	1896	Double Deck	75	Brush (Lougborough)	Scrapped
12	1896	Double Deck	75	Brush (Lougborough)	Scrapped
13	1896	Double Deck	75	Brush (Lougborough)	Scrapped
14	1896	Double Deck	75	Brush (Lougborough)	Scrapped
15	1896	Double Deck	75	Brush (Lougborough)	Scrapped
16	1896	Double Deck	75	Brush (Lougborough)	Scrapped

== Remains ==
There is little left of the line as it was, save for the castellated entrance to the Marine Drive itself. The tramway's sheds and workshops were located mid-way along the line at Little Ness, together with the power station for generating the electricity but this was filled in and is now a car park. The roadway has been closed for several years owing to a number of serious landslides, but in the 1960s the local authority of Douglas Corporation attempted to rejuvenate the area by introducing a bus service on the coastal route. However, it was short-lived owing to further landslides which made the road unsafe. Today parts of the route can be used by motor traffic, but a stretch north of Little Ness is only open to pedestrians. The route of this railway provides views of the Irish Sea, and forms part of the Isle of Man's coastal footpath Raad ny Foillan (Way of the Gull), created in 1986.

There exists a film of a ride on this tramway in 1902 made by Mitchell and Kenyon and available at the British Film Institute. The journey has been described as a white knuckle ride.

After closure, motor car no. 1 was rescued from the line's isolated depot and, after a period of storage on the island, the car was moved in 1956 to London, where it was restored and put on display in the British Transport Museum. When that museum closed, its ownership was transferred to the city's Science Museum. Since 1975 it has been on long-term loan to the National Tramway Museum at Crich in Derbyshire, where it is on static display in the exhibition hall.

== Locations ==
Point	Coordinates (Links to map resources)	OS Grid Ref	Notes
Douglas Head	54.1434°N 4.4695°W	SC38797477	
Marine Drive Arch	54.1407°N 4.4707°W	SC38707447	
Pigeon Stream Depot	54.1378°N 4.4797°W	SC38107417	
Wallberry Viaduct	54.1314°N 4.4955°W	SC37047349	
Horseleap Viaduct	54.1300°N 4.4980°W	SC36877334	
Little Ness Depot	54.1276°N 4.5044°W	SC36447309	
Whing Loop	54.1297°N 4.5113°W	SC36007334	
Port Soderick	54.1243°N 4.5302°W	SC34757278	

== Gallery ==
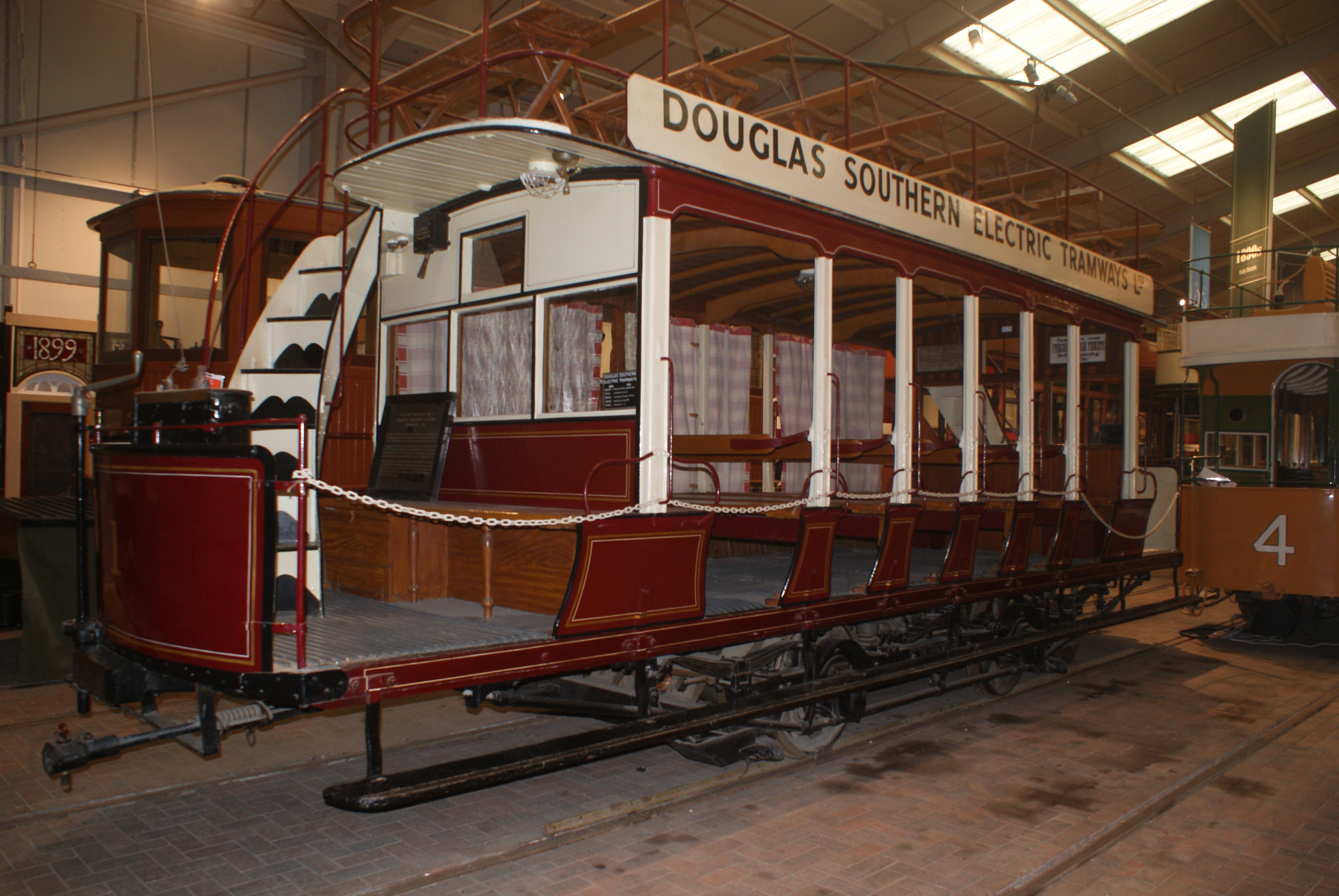
The preserved tram at Crich

Marine Drive, the former route of the tramway

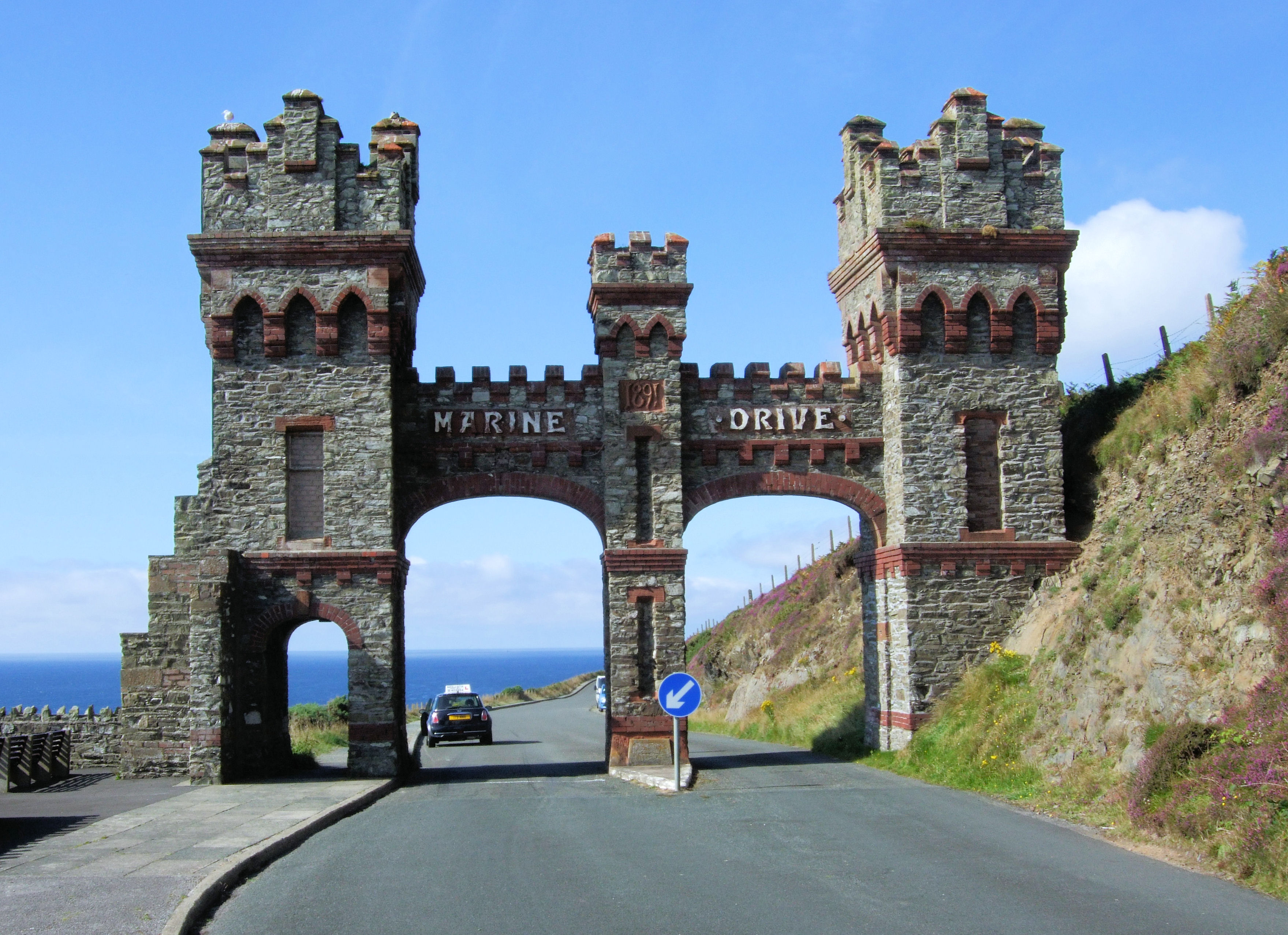
Entrance To Marine Drive
