= Chesterfield tramway =

Tramway system in Derbyshire, England

Chesterfield Tramway
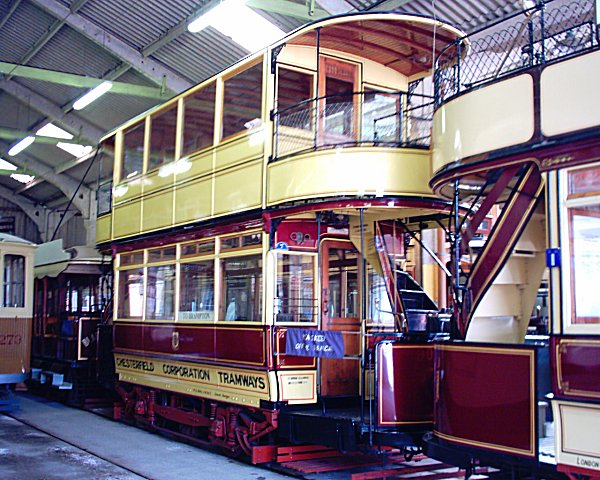
- Restored electric tramcar no. 7 at the National Tramway Museum, Crich

Overview
- Headquarters: Chesterfield
- Locale: England
- Dates of operation: 1882–1927
- Successor: Abandoned

Technical
- Track gauge: 4 ft 8 1/2 in (1,435 mm)
- Length: 3 5/8 miles (5.8 km)

The Chesterfield and District Tramways Company and its successors ran a tramway system in the Derbyshire town of Chesterfield, England. The first horse-drawn line opened in 1882, and in 1897, the system was taken over by Chesterfield Corporation, who extended and electrified it in 1904 and 1905. Additional tramcars were purchased, but two had to be scrapped after a disastrous fire at the depot in 1916. The system suffered from a lack of maintenance as a result of reduced staffing levels during the First World War, and the trams were replaced by trolleybuses in 1927.

Chesterfield Corporation obtained an act of Parliament, the Chesterfield Corporation Railless Traction Act 1913 (3 & 4 Geo. 5. c. xxxv), authorising it to build a network of trolleybus lines, and was nearly a pioneer in this field, but did not follow the plan through. When trolleybuses appeared in Chesterfield, they only operated on the former tramway route, with a small extension to New Whittington. A total of 19 trolleybuses were used on the system, including two double-deck vehicles, and three trolleybuses bought second-had from York. Expansion of the system was hampered by low railway bridges, and that was one of the reasons why the trolleybuses were replaced by motor buses in 1938.

== History ==
The Chesterfield and District Tramways Company obtained an order to allow it to build two lines in Chesterfield. This was the Chesterfield, Brampton and Whittington Tramways Order 1879, confirmed by the Tramways Orders Confirmation Act 1879 (42 & 43 Vict. c. cxciii) and the two lines totalled 4.5 miles (7.2 km), but the company only constructed part of one of the lines, building 1.25 miles (2.0 km) of standard gauge 4 ft 8 1/2 in (1,435 mm) track. This ran from the junction of Chatsworth Road and Walton Lane (now Walton Road) in the district of Brampton to the town centre at Low Pavement, near the market place, passing along Chatsworth Road and West Bars. There was a depot to the south of Chatsworth Road at Rodney Yard, just to the east of Alma Street. Joseph Speight of St Helens was employed to build the line, which progressed rather slowly, but it was eventually completed and the line opened on 8 November 1882. The trams were horse-drawn, and there were three vehicles, two double deck cars and one single deck car, all built by Ashbury Railway Carriage and Iron Company Ltd. The company was short-lived, and went into voluntary liquidation in February 1885, with debts of £500.

The Chesterfield Tramways Company was registered on 6 December 1886, and took over the tramway. The company brought two more tramcars, probably single deck vehicles built by G. F. Milnes & Co. and reduced the fare prices from 2d to 1d. Chesterfield Corporation were keen to be involved in their own tram system, and when the tramways company offered it to them in 1897, they paid £2,050 and took over the tramway from 22 November. The fee included the cost of winding up for the now-defunct Chesterfield Tramways Company.

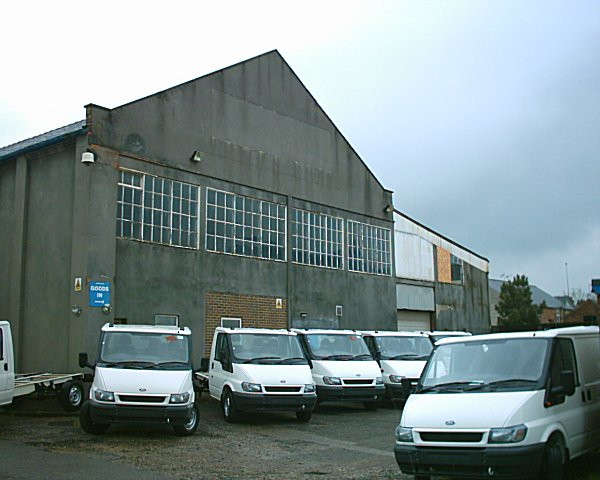
Chatsworth Road depot in 2006.

Chesterfield Corporation bought a new single deck tram from Milnes in 1898, and two more cars in 1899. Expansion continued with the purchase in 1903 of two second-hand double deck trams from Sheffield Tramway, although some sources suggest that only one vehicle was bought, and that it may never have run on the system. By this time the Corporation were considering extending and electrifying the line. The town's first electrical engineer and tramways manager was Robert Lawford Acland, and under his direction, they obtained the Chesterfield Corporation Tramways and Improvements Act 1904 (4 Edw. 7. c. xxxvii) to authorise the work. In order to allow the existing tracks to be relaid, the horse tram service was suspended from August 1904, when the work began. A new section of track, running northwards from the original Market Place terminus to Whittington Moor, more than doubled the length of the system. The horse tram service resumed once the line towards Brampton was completed, although it stopped short of the Brampton terminus, and the whole system was inspected by the Board of Trade on 19 December 1904. There is some doubt as to when the electric service started, due to conflicting sources, but the route to Brampton was running by 23 December, and half of the new route to the borough boundary at Stonegravels began operating on 24 December. The final section to Whittington Moor did not see trams until 31 January 1905. The initial service was provided by a fleet of twelve open-topped double deck trams, built by Brush Electrical Engineering Company.

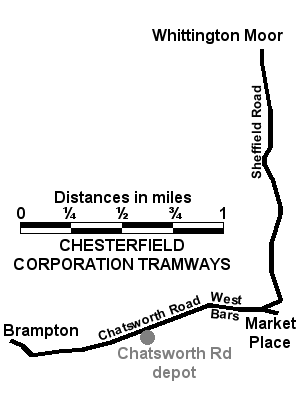
Chesterfield Corporation Tramways network plan

In order to house the trams, a new depot was built, again on the south side of Chatsworth Road, but a little further to the west, opposite School Board Lane. There was a passing loop at this location, and a 'Y' junction allowed trams to enter the system in either direction. The depot tracks crossed the southern side of the loop, and joined the northern side. Within the depot, there were four tracks, all built over inspection pits. The tram shed, which was 126 feet (38 m) long and 26 feet (7.9 m) wide, was built of bricks with a pitched slate roof. It was constructed by departmental staff, and is one of the few buildings from the early tramway period to have survived.

The tramway was mostly single track with passing loops, with a spur to the original Low Pavement terminus, although there was double track in the town centre, and a section of the route along Sheffield Road to Whittington Moor was doubled in 1905. Weekends proved to be rather busy so the line was operated in two sections, as no trams were allowed through the town centre. Facing crossovers on Low Pavement and Cavendish Street allowed two tramcars to park side by side.

The corporation had purchased two more tramcars in 1907, and a water car in 1909, by which time they were facing difficulties with the tramway system. Some of the estimates as to how long equipment would last had been over-optimistic, and the tracks were wearing out, particularly on curves and points for the passing loops. The system had been funded by long-term loans, but passenger numbers had remained fairly static, and financial deficits began to mount up. The overhead wires and tramcars were also needing attention, but despite this, three new balcony cars were bought from Brush in 1914.

In order to accommodate the extra trams, an extension was added to the western side of the depot in 1914. During the First World War, the number of staff employed on the tramway system reduced significantly, and the track soon began to suffer from the lack of maintenance. Some of the shortfall was made up by employing women, who served both as conductresses and as drivers. One of them, Millicent Rowbotham, was awarded £1 by the Tramways Committee after she braked hard to reduce the impact of a head-on crash on West Bars. When the war ended, young men returned to their posts as motormen, although the tramway continued to employ some women until the end of 1921. In the mid-1920s, the Corporation decided to replace the trams with trolleybuses. Conversion work to the overhead wires was necessary, and to enable this to happen, the tram service to Brampton was suspended on 28 February 1927. The trams were replaced by petrol buses until the new wiring was in place. Trams on the section to Whittington Moor were withdrawn from 23 May 1927, and were again replaced by petrol buses until the conversion work was completed.

=== Trolleybuses ===
Chesterfield Corporation Railless Traction Act 1913
- Act of Parliament
- Parliament of the United Kingdom
- Long title: An Act to enable the corporation of Chesterfield to provide and run vehicles by means of railless traction and for other purposes.
- Citation: 3 & 4 Geo. 5. c. xxxv

Dates
- Royal assent: 15 August 1913

Other legislation
- Repealed by: Post Office Act 1969

Status: Repealed

Text of statute as originally enacted

Chesterfield Corporation was nearly an early pioneer in the use of trolleybuses, in that the Chesterfield Corporation Railless Traction Act 1913 (3 & 4 Geo. 5. c. xxxv) allowed them to build five routes, which would have acted as extensions to the tramway. The routes radiated out from the town centre, and would have served Newbold to the north-west, Unstone to the north, Brimington to the north-east, Temple Normanton to the south-east and Clay Cross to the south. However, they did not proceed with the scheme, and it was not until the 1920s, when the tramway tracks needed serious maintenance, that consideration was again given to a trolleybus system. In 1926 an order for 14 vehicles was placed with Straker-Squire, whose products were marketed as Straker-Clough trolley omnibuses, and the bodywork was built by Reeve and Kenning, who were based in the nearby village of Pilsley. The first trolleybus arrived in Chesterfield on 21 April 1927, allowing trials to be carried out. Conversion of the overhead wiring on the Brampton section was completed on 23 May 1927, and trolleybuses began running in the evening. Conversion of the northern route to Whittington Moor then began, and was completed to allow the full service to begin on 27 September 1927, following an opening ceremony. The trolleybus route followed the tram route, with the exception of a short section in the town centre, where a one-way system was introduced.

A new depot was built at Thornfield, Stonegavels, consisting of a steel frame with corrugated iron cladding. It was 295 feet (90 m) by 150 feet (46 m), with a floor area of 30,000 square feet (2,800 m^{2}). It could stable 100 vehicles, and was used by motorbuses as well as the trolleybuses. In order to access the building, trolleybuses travelled along Hardwick Street and entered from the back, allowing them to leave from the front when starting service.

Within a month of the new service starting, the corporation decided to extend the northern route from Whittington Moor to New Whittington, a distance of just over 2 miles (3.2 km). Trolleybuses began running to New Whittington on 29 July 1929. Two low height double deck trolleybuses were purchased in 1931, from Ransomes of Ipswich. The final expansion of the fleet took place in 1936, when three Karrier-Clough model E4 trolleybuses were bought second-hand from York, where the York trolleybus system had closed on 5 January 1935. They did not last long at Chesterfield, as the decision to replace the trolleybuses with motor buses was made in 1937. Reasons for the closure included the need for renewal of the overhead wiring, the cost of electricity, and the fact that extensions to the system were hampered by a number of low railway bridges. The system closed on 24 March 1938, when the final journey consisted of two single deck vehicles filled with councillors. The unwanted vehicles were stored in a field at the side of the depot, where they remained until the summer, with no attempts being made to sell them. They were eventually sold to a scrapyard for £80.50.

== Fleet ==
The tramway ran a plethora of tramcars.

=== Horse cars ===
Car numbers	Type (as built)	Year built	Builder	Seats	Notes
1-2	Open top	1882	Ashbury	32	
3	Single deck	1882	Ashbury	16	
4-5	Single deck	1890	Milnes	16	
6	Single deck	1898	Milnes	16	
7-8	Single deck	1899	Milnes	16	No.8 preserved
9	Open top	1903		32	Ex-Sheffield. 1 or 2 cars

Cars 1 and 2 were fitted with Eade's trucks. These resulted in a lighter-weight tram, as they only required a staircase to reach the upper deck at the back end of the car. When the tram reached a terminus, the horses would move sideways, swinging the whole body around through 180 degrees on a central pivot, while the wheels remained stationary on the track. The seats on the lower deck were arranged across the body of the tram, so that passengers faced forwards, but on the upper deck there was a central knifeboard seat, with passengers facing the sides of the vehicle.

Tramcar No. 8 was sold when the system was electrified, and was used as a summer house until 1934. It was then obtained by the chairman of Chesterfield Corporation's transport sub-committee, and moved to the bus garage at Thornfield, where the Corporation Transport Department restored it. After a period in storage, it was given to the Science Museum, who displayed it between 1962 and 1970, before it spent another 15 years mostly in storage. In 1985, it was placed on loan to the National Tramway Museum by the Science Museum, and in 2016 ownership passed to the National Tramway Museum. It operated for a total of 10 seasons, covering a distance of 120 miles (190 km), but has been on display as a static exhibit at Crich since the end of the 1993 season.

=== Electric cars ===
Car numbers	Type (as built)	Year built	Builder	Seats	Truck	Motors	Controllers	Length	Wheelbase
1-12	'Aston' type open top	1904	Brush	22+34	Brush	Westinghouse 90M	2x25hp	26 ft (7.9 m)	8 ft 6 in (2.59 m)
13-14	Open top	1907	Brush	22+34	Brush flexible axle truck	Westinghouse 90M	2x25hp		8 ft 6 in (2.59 m)
15	Water car	1909	Brush	none	Brush	Westinghouse 90M	2x25hp		8 ft 6 in (2.59 m)
16-18	Balcony	1914	Brush	22+34	Peckham P22 Pendulum	Westinghouse T1	2x25hp		8 ft (2.4 m)

The first 12 trams bought for the opening of the system were built by Brush Electrical Engineering Company at Loughborough. They had seating for 22 passengers in the lower saloon and 34 on the top deck. Five additional trams and a water car had been acquired by 1914, but a fire broke out at the depot in the early morning on 20 October 1916, and many of the cars were damaged. Car 8 and one of the three cars bought in 1914 were sufficiently damaged that they were scrapped, but the rest were repaired. There is some evidence that two replacement vehicles were purchased in 1920, but few details survive. At around the same time, seven of the open-topped tramcars were fitted with top covers, converting them into balcony cars. No. 17 was completely rebuilt after the fire, and No. 7 had a top cover fitted at that time. Dates for the rest are less certain, but by 1919 cars 6, 8, 11 and 12 had all been roofed with top covers. The water car was a single deck vehicle, with the central section occupied by a 2,000-imperial-gallon (9,100 L) cylindrical water tank. This was used to spray the roads and tracks.

Tramcar No. 7 was among the vehicles sold when the system closed in 1927, and became a holiday cottage at Two Dales in Derbyshire. By 1973 the cottage was semi-derelict, but was offered for sale, and was bought by the Tramway Museum Society, who transferred the remains to Crich for conservation. The car was restored between 1993 and 1996 at a cost of £120,000. It has operated on the line at Crich Tramway Village since 1997, covering a distance of 18,520 miles (29,810 km) by the end of the 2018 season. Because only the bodywork was sold, the tramcar currently has different electrical equipment to that originally fitted. It now runs on a Peckham P22 truck, rather than the original Brush, Lycett & Conaty radial truck, and is powered by two BTH 40 hp (30 kW) RGE20 motors, which are controlled by a Westinghouse T2C controller.

=== Trolleybuses ===
Fleet numbers	Chassis	Electrical equipment	Body	Type	In service
1-12, 14-15	Straker-Clough	BTH	Reeve & Kenning B32C	single deck	1927
16-17	Ransomes D2	BTH	Ransomes L24/24R	double deck	1931
18-20	Karrier E4	BTH	Roe B32R	single deck	1936

Vehicles 18 to 20 had been built in 1931 for the York trolleybus system, and carried the numbers 30 to 32 before moving to Chesterfield. In addition to its own fleet, the Chesterfield system played host to a number of visiting trolleybuses. The first was an English Electric single deck vehicle, registration number CK 3898, which covered 179 miles (288 km) in June 1928, before its delivery to Maidstone. From August to October 1931, the prototype Leyland TDB1 double deck trolleybus was tested out in Chesterfield, covering nearly 5,000 miles (8,000 km). It looked like a motorbus, with a half cab and dummy radiator. Its registration number was OV 1175, and it subsequently worked in Birmingham. It was then fitted with a petrol engine, was re-registered as SV 6107, and was shipped to Jersey in 1934. At the end of its commercial service, it was preserved, and appears at rallies. The next visitor was the prototype Leyland TBS1, registration number TJ 2822, a single deck vehicle which covered nearly 9,000 miles (14,000 km) between September and December 1933. In December 1935, a Leyland TB10 demonstrator covered some 1,300 miles (2,100 km) on the system. It was a three-axle double deck vehicle, with front and rear entrances, a seating capacity of 63, and carried the registration number ATD 747.

== External sources ==
Media related to Chesterfield Tramway at Wikimedia Commons
