= Leeds Tramways Company =

Tramway operator in Yorkshire, England

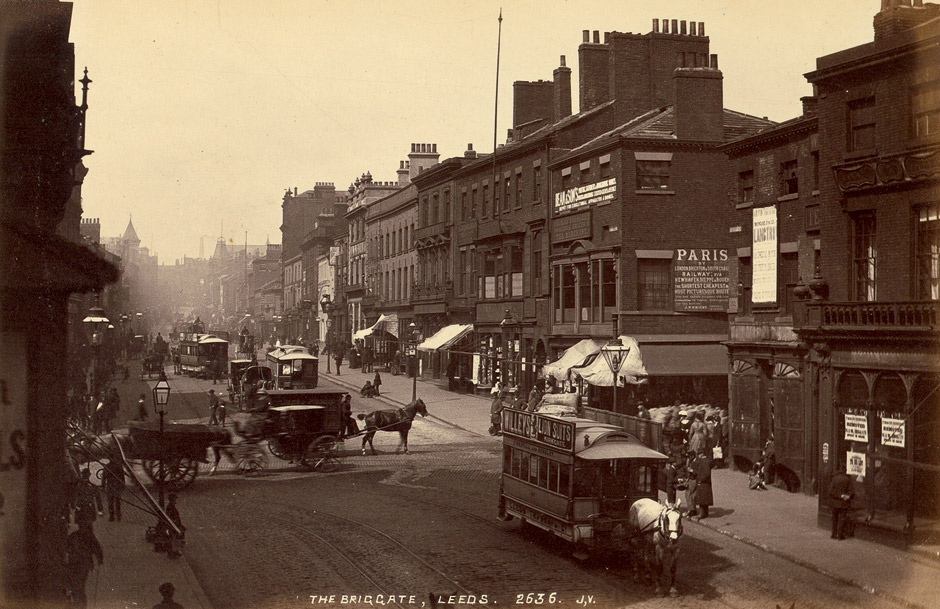
- Trams on Briggate

Operation
- Locale: Leeds
- Open: 16 September 1871
- Close: 2 February 1894
- Status: Closed

Infrastructure
- Track gauge: 4 ft 8 1/2 in (1,435 mm)
- Propulsion systems: Horse and steam

Statistics
- Route length: 14.16 miles (22.79 km)

Leeds Tramways Company operated a tramway service in Leeds between 1871 and 1894.

== History ==
The Leeds Tramways Order 1871 authorised the Leeds Tramways Company to construct tramway lines in Leeds. The first route opened on 16 September 1871 from Boar Lane to Oak Inn, Headingley.

With subsequently built additional routes and extensions the total length of the network increased to just over 14 miles (22.5 km).

A successful experiment with steam traction took place in 1882, and from this time onwards until the end of services the company operated a mixture of horse drawn and steam services.

=== William Turton ===
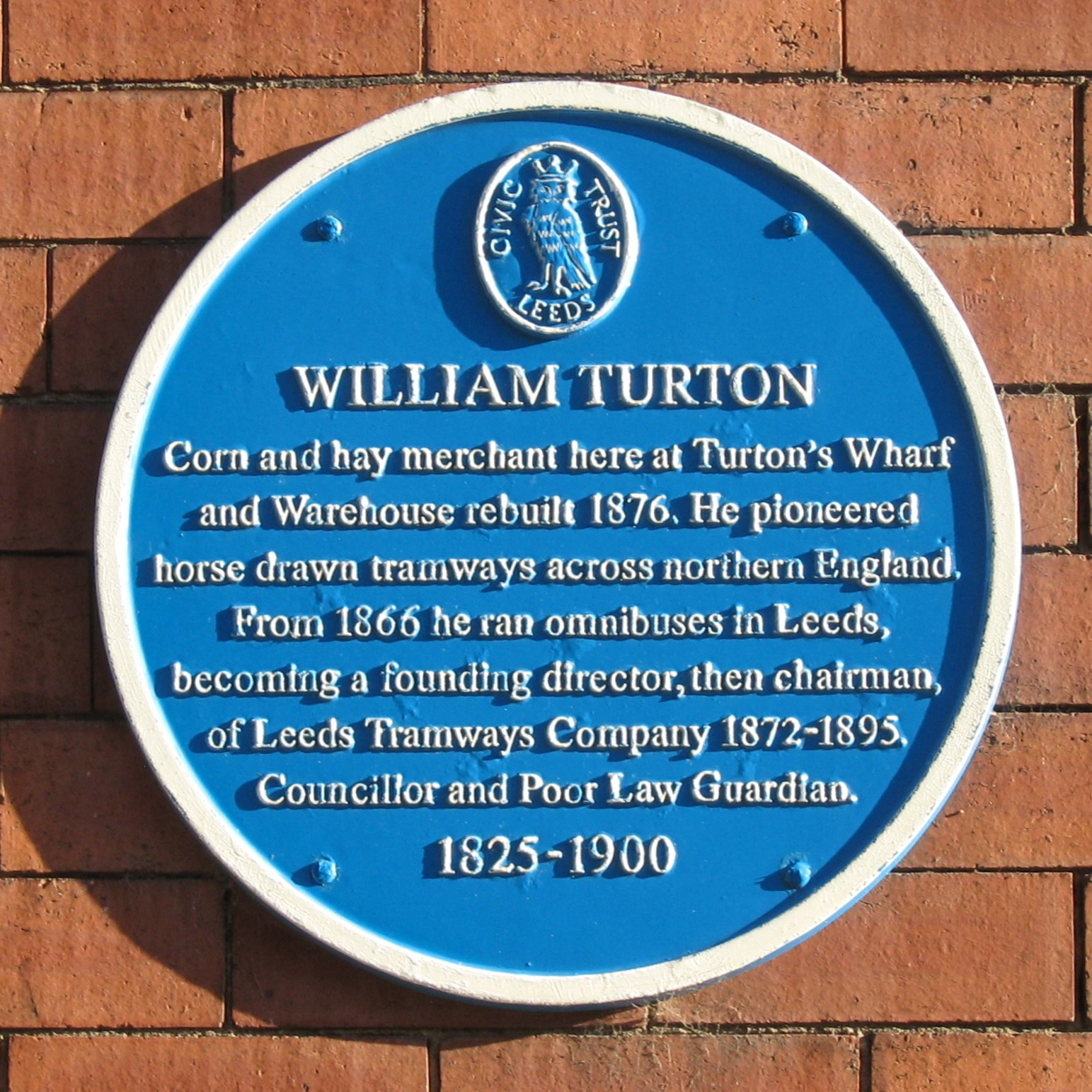
William Turton blue plaque 4 August 2018

William Turton pioneered the use of horse-drawn tramways and was the founding director of the company.

== Closure ==
Leeds Corporation purchased the tramway company in 1893 for the sum of £112,225 with the aim of modernising it and extending it, which it did under the control of Leeds Corporation Tramways. It took direct control of operations in 1894.

== See also ==
- Leeds Tramway
- Leeds Supertram
- Trolleybuses in Leeds
- Transport in Leeds
- History of Leeds
