= Third International Electric Tramway and Railway Exhibition =

1905 exhibition held in England

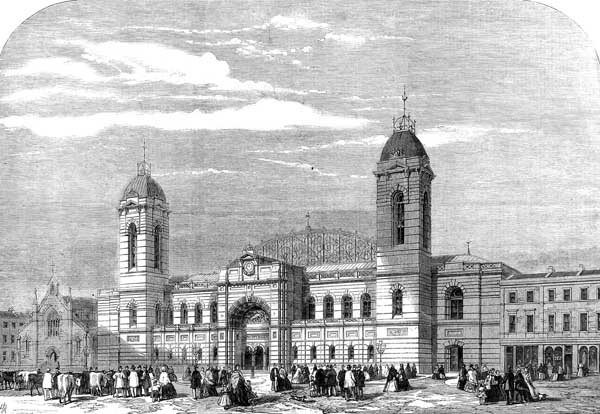
The Royal Agricultural Hall in 1861, seen from Liverpool Road.

Interior of the Royal Agricultural Hall

The Third International Electric Tramway and Railway Exhibition was held in the Royal Agricultural Hall, Islington, London, England, from 3 July 1905 to 14 July 1905.

It was a successor event to the Second International Tramways and Light Railways Exhibition held in 1902.

The Third International Electric Tramway and Railway Exhibition was opened on 3 July 1905 by Frederick Stanley, 16th Earl of Derby. It was organised by Tramway and Railway World. There were over 150 exhibitors, including the major suppliers of tramway and light railway equipment were present, including:

- Brush Electrical Engineering Company
- Bruce Peebles & Co. Ltd.
- Dick, Kerr & Co.

Although some of the largest electrical manufacturing companies did not exhibit there in 1905, the exhibits of the smaller companies, especially those handling auxiliary apparatus, were better than in previous years, and the exhibition, while it lasted, was well attended throughout and proved entirely successful.
