= Dick, Kerr Type Tram =

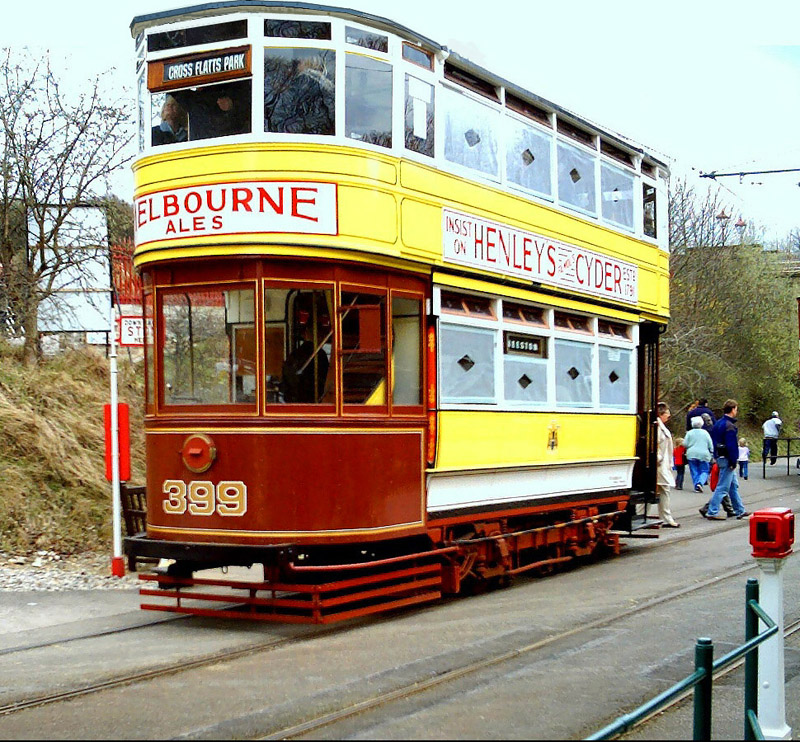
The Dick, Kerr Type Tram from the Leeds Tramway

The Dick, Kerr Type tram was the classic British tram design. It was the most common tram seen on Britain's tramways until the 1950s. The Trams were built by Dick, Kerr & Co. of Preston and Kilmarnock. They were the flagship design of the company. Many different types of the tram were designed. These included:

- The Fully Enclosed Tram - All of the tram and driver's compartment was enclosed.
- The Semi-Enclosed Tram - All of the tram except the driver's compartment was enclosed.
- The Open Tram - All of the tram was open to the elements.

Many variations of the tram were designed, including the double-deck and single deck tram.
