= Leeds New Lane railway station =

Proposed railway station in West Yorkshire, England

Leeds New Lane
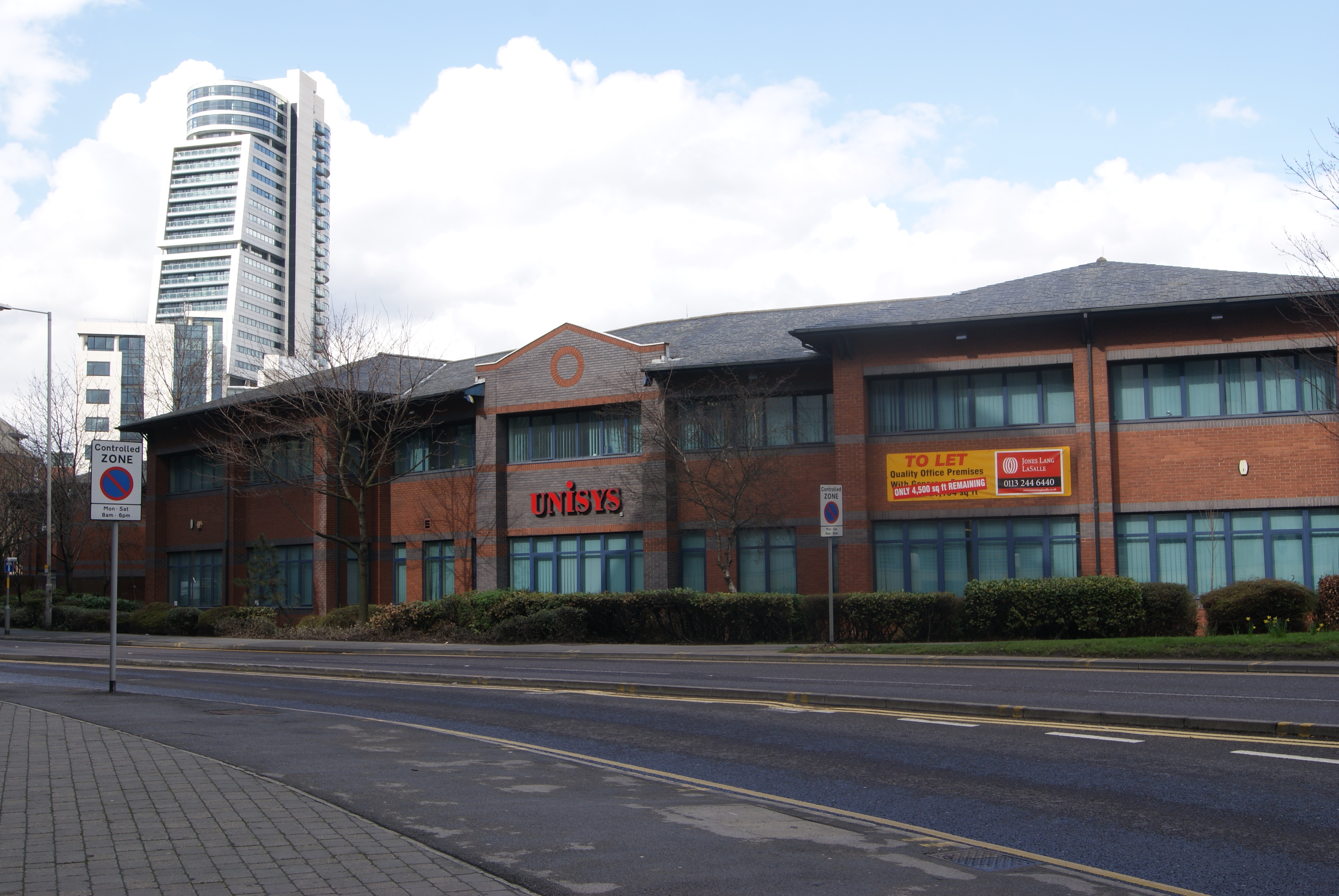
- Central Park, an office park which stands on the site.

General information
- Location: Leeds city centre, City of Leeds; England
- Coordinates: 53.79°N 1.545°W
- Managed by: Network Rail
- Transit authority: West Yorkshire (Metro)
- Platforms: unknown (proposed)

Other information
- Fare zone: 1

History
- Opening: 2032
Location

Leeds New Lane was a proposed new railway station to accommodate High Speed Two rail services in West Yorkshire, England. It was planned to be constructed on a viaduct on New Lane south of Leeds city centre, the River Aire and Leeds City station to which it would be connected by an elevated walkway. The site is occupied by Central Park, a small low-rise office park built in the 1990s and other small office buildings.

Whilst originally the preferred station option, a November 2015 review of the phase two route instead proposed that the Leeds HS2 platforms should join onto the side of the existing Leeds station. Unlike New Lane, this would have provided a common concourse for easy interchange between high speed and classic rail services.

== Background ==
In 2009, the Labour Government created High Speed Two Ltd to examine the prospect of further high-speed rail in the United Kingdom. Later in 2010, the Coalition Government confirmed there would be a terminus in both Leeds and Manchester. In January 2013 the final route was announced with a new station being proposed for Leeds and a new station adjacent to Piccadilly station for the terminus in Manchester. Both Leeds and Manchester were to have junctions to the south of the cities allowing for connections to the East Coast Main Line and the West Coast Main Line respectively.

== Proposal ==
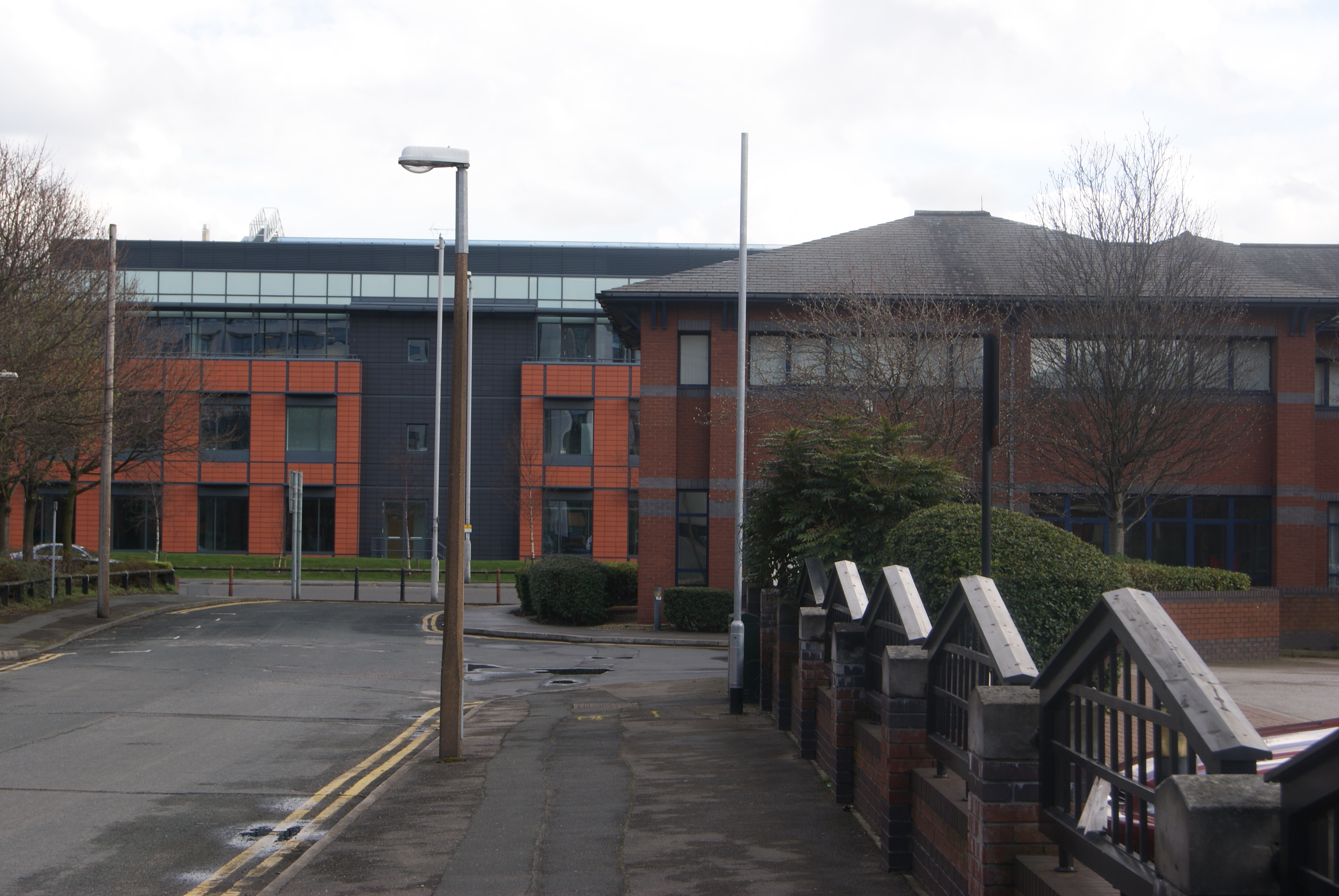
New Lane in April 2010

Publication of the proposed route on 28 January 2013 showed that the Leeds station would be a new terminus connected to Leeds City station by airport-style pedestrian walkways, possibly with moving walkways.

The configuration and design of the station has not been confirmed. New Lane is one-quarter of a mile (0.4 km) south of Leeds station and is a cul-de-sac in the centre of a gyratory, containing a small business park. There is no railway infrastructure at the site. Previously there were railways to the west with a goods yard at Crown Point (see Leeds Hunslet Lane railway station) and mineral lines to transport coal to Meadow Lane Gas Works.

The site is next to Bridgewater Place and close to Holbeck Urban Village and the M621 motorway.

=== Proposed facilities ===
Few details of the proposed facilities have been released, however the Department for Transport have confirmed car parking will be provided to the south of the site. The station will link to Leeds station which has ticket offices, car parks, a bus interchange and two concourses containing retail, restaurant and licensed facilities. There are currently proposals to expand these to larger facilities. With the link this will enable facilities to be shared by the two stations. The plans released appear to show the New Lane site with a sizeable concourse.

== Public transport ==
First Leeds bus routes run around the gyratory and there are stops on Victoria Road and Meadow Lane. Both the formerly proposed Leeds Supertram and Leeds Trolleybus routes would have passed within half a mile of the site.

== Location in Leeds and on HS2 ==
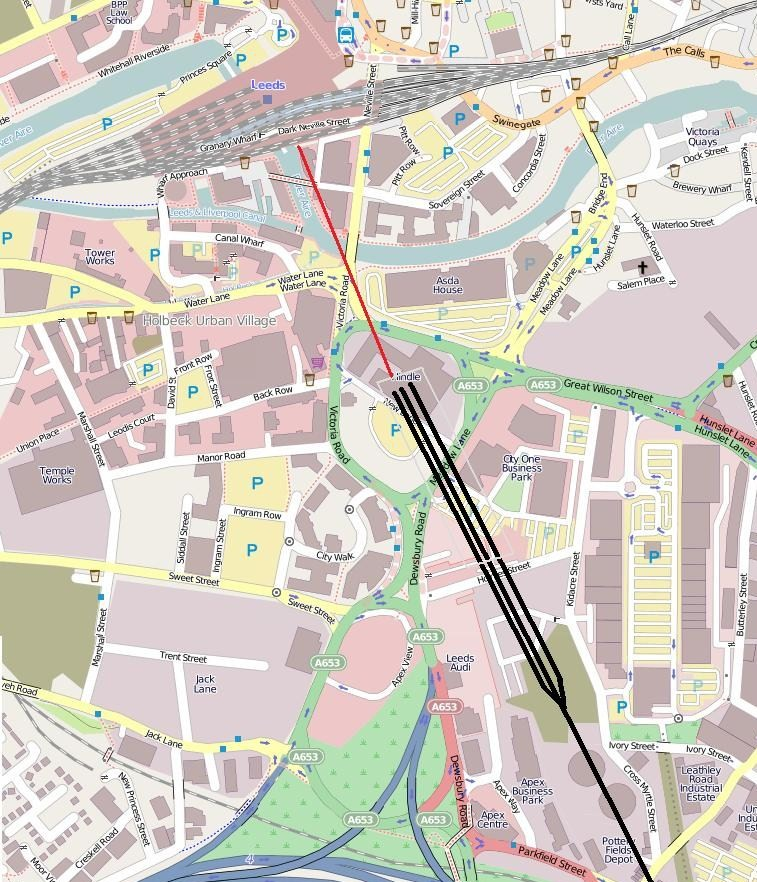
The proposed location of Leeds New Lane (black:tracks, red:pedestrian walkway, grey:station area)

The plans show the tracks approaching the station from the south-east, parallel to the Pontefract Line and then the M621, coming through Meadow Lane Gas Works and Leeds City Business Park, with the station on a viaduct which spreads from the centre of the gyratory through the Leeds City Business Park site: the viaduct would extend 290m beyond the station buildings. This would mean the relocation of several businesses, a Leeds City Council depot and a natural gas storage facility consisting of two low-pressure gas holders.

Preceding station	Future services	Following station
Meadowhall Interchange	TBA; High Speed 2	Terminus

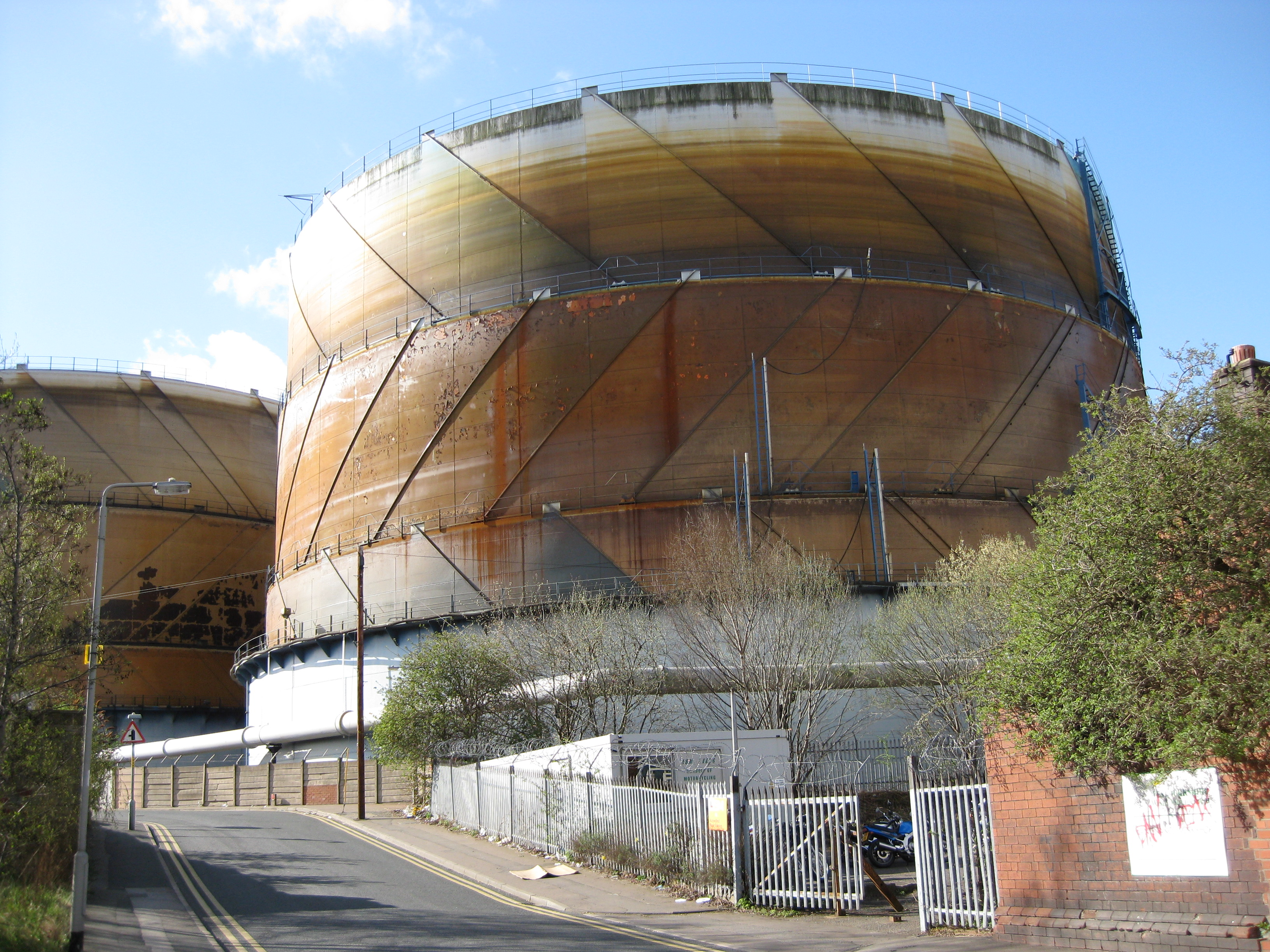
The Meadow Lane gas holders are in the path of the development

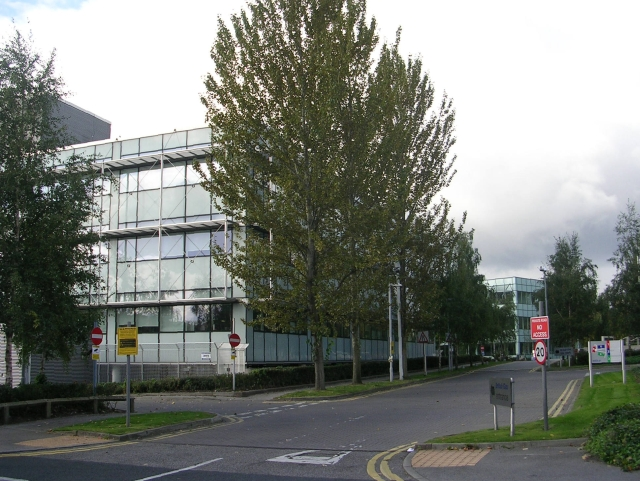
The Leeds City Business Park, also in the path of the development

== Withdrawal of preferred status ==
In November 2015 an interim report on the Leeds HS2 station location was published. This stated that New Lane was no longer the preferred station location, as it would be too detached from the existing Leeds station and too isolated from the city centre. Instead it recommends that a different location for the HS2 platforms be found which shares a common concourse with the existing Leeds station. The suggested location has the platforms connect to the existing station building across the river from the South, creating a 'T' shape.

== See also ==
- High Speed 2
- Leeds railway station
- Transport in Leeds
