= Second International Tramways and Light Railways Exhibition =

1902 exhibition held in London, England

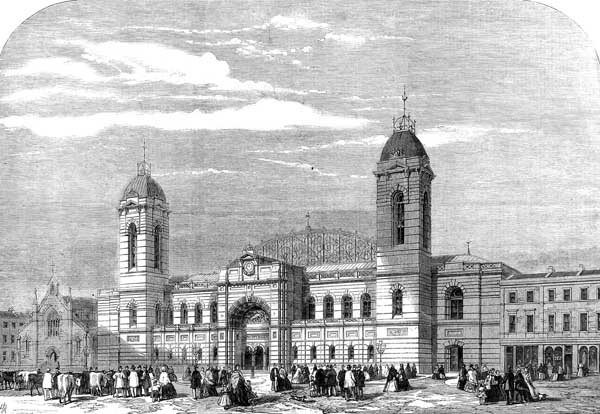
The Royal Agricultural Hall in 1861, seen from Liverpool Road.

The Second International Tramways and Light Railways Exhibition was held in the Royal Agricultural Hall, Islington, London from 1 July 1902 – 12 July 1902.

It was a successor event to the First International Tramways and Light Railways Exhibition held in 1900.

The Second International Tramways and Light Railways Exhibition was opened on 1 July 1902 by the President of the Board of Trade, Gerald Balfour, 2nd Earl of Balfour. It was organised by Tramway and Railway World. The major suppliers of tramway and light railway equipment were present, including:

- Brush Electrical Engineering Company
- The British Electric Car Company
- Dick, Kerr & Co.

The International Tramways and Light Railways Congress held its meetings on 1 and 2 July, co-inciding with the exhibition. This was the 12th congress held by the Union Internationale Permanenete de Tramways, and the first in London.

A successor event, the Third International Electric Tramway and Railway Exhibition was held in 1905.
