= Dick, Kerr & Co. =

Rolling stock manufacturer

- Formerly: W.B. Dick & Co. (1854–1883); Dick, Kerr & Co (1883–1919)
- Type: Private
- Industry: Rail transport
- Founded: 1854 in Glasgow
- Founder: William Bruce Dick
- Defunct: 1919; 107 years ago
- Fate: Acquired by English Electric
- Headquarters: Kilmarnock (1854–93); Preston (1893–)
- Area served: United Kingdom
- Products: Locomotives, trams, tram engines

Dick, Kerr and Company was a locomotive and tramcar manufacturer based in Kilmarnock, Scotland and Preston, England.

== Early history ==
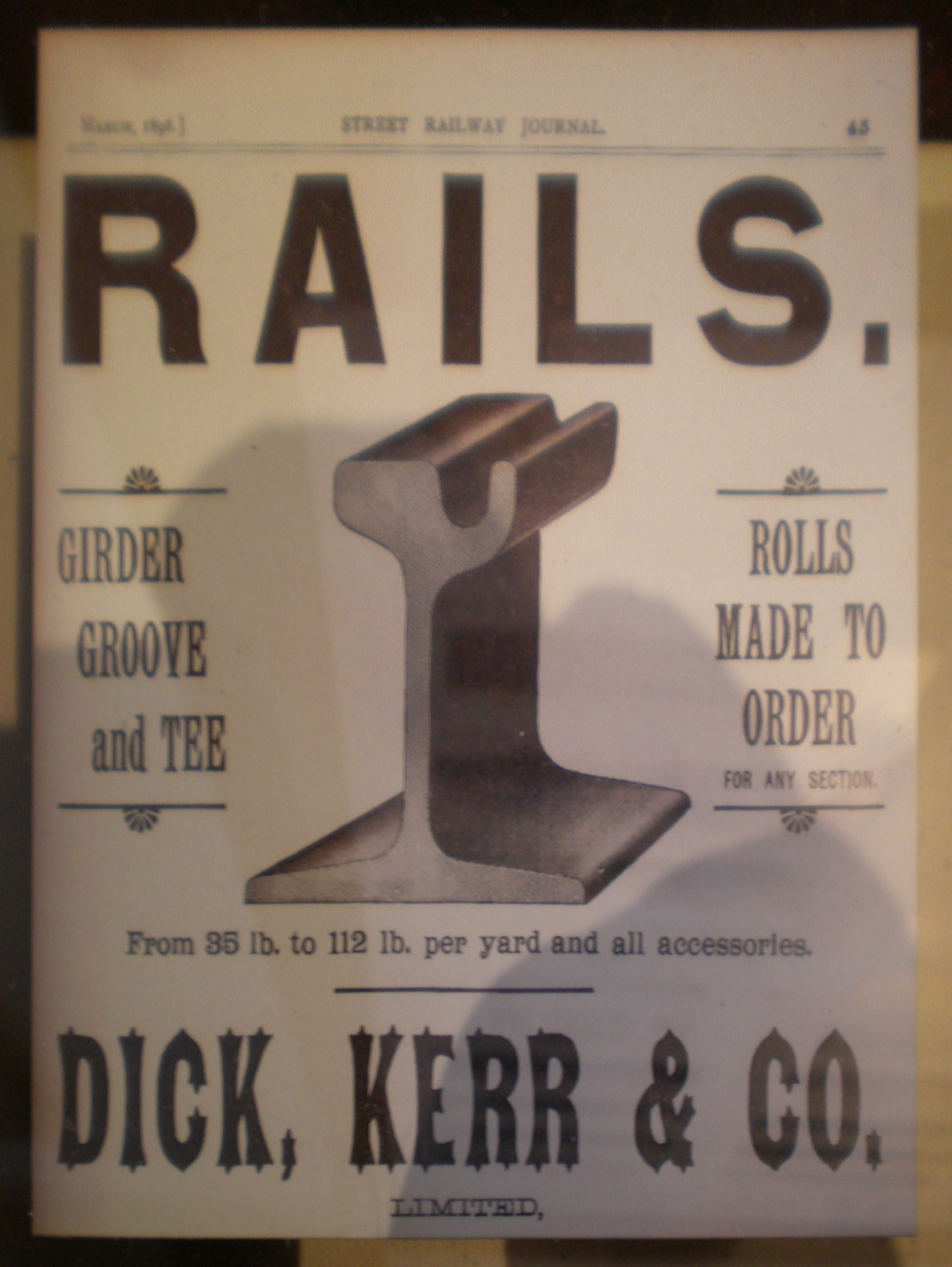
Advertisement for rails by Dick, Kerr & Co. in the Street Railway Journal, March 1896, on display at the San Francisco Railway Museum

W.B. Dick and Company was founded in 1854 in Glasgow by William Bruce Dick. The company were initially oil refiners and manufacturers of paint used for coating the bottom of ships. They had depots and works in Glasgow, Liverpool, Newcastle, Barrow-in-Furness, Cardiff and Hamburg by 1890. From 1883 the company joined with John Kerr and under its new name, expanded into rail transport, supplying tramway equipment and rolling stock and built around fifty locomotives up to 1919.

In 1885 Dick, Kerr and Co. started construction of 6 steam launches at its Britannia Works, Kilmarnock. In 1888 it produced the 'Griffin' gas engine which is described and illustrated in The Engineer. This 6-stroke engine was devised to get around Otto's patent of the 4-stroke cycle. By 1892 Dick, Kerr was producing gas engines in a wide range of sizes using the Otto principle, both single and double acting.

In 1890 it took limited company status, as railway and tramway appliance makers and as iron and steel founders and electricians. There was a public offer of shares to acquire the engineering and contracting company of the same name –reasons given were the advancing years of the senior partner and the need for investment to expand the works at Kilmarnock including a modern iron and steel foundry.

Until the late 1890s the company had largely produced steam tram engines, but in 1888 they bought the assets of the Patent Cable Tramways Corporation (including the Highgate Cable Tramway) and in 1892 they built the Brixton Cable Tramway for the London Tramways Company. They built other cable tramways in Douglas, Matlock and two in Edinburgh, but while cable tramways overcame problems where horse tramways struggled with hills, it was the electric tramway that came to dominate, and Dick, Kerr became one of the largest manufacturers of electric tramway cars.

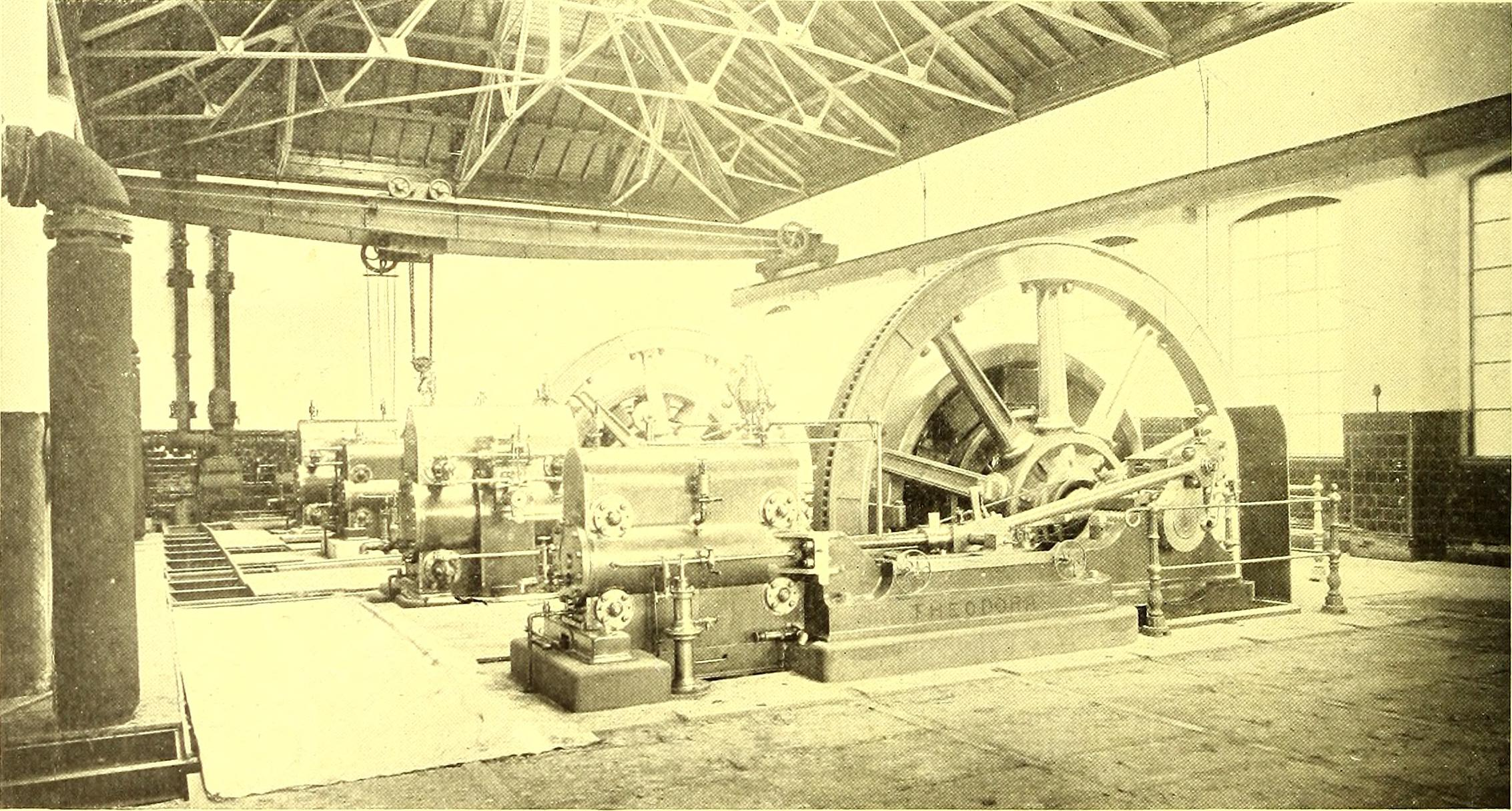
Generating Station, Preston, from a 1900 advertisement in the Street Railway Journal

The company facilities in Preston, Lancashire, were acquired in 1893 along with the railway and tramway plant activities of Hartley, Arnoux and Fanning which had been bought from Kerr Stuart and Company.

The company was registered on 24 August 1899, as a reconstruction of a company of the same name, to take over a business of engineers and contractors. In 1899 the "English Electric Manufacturing Co." was incorporated as a public company, for purpose of manufacturing, at its own new works at Preston, every variety of electrical machinery, particularly for use by railways and tramways. In 1900 it was an exhibitor at the First International Tramways and Light Railways Exhibition in London.

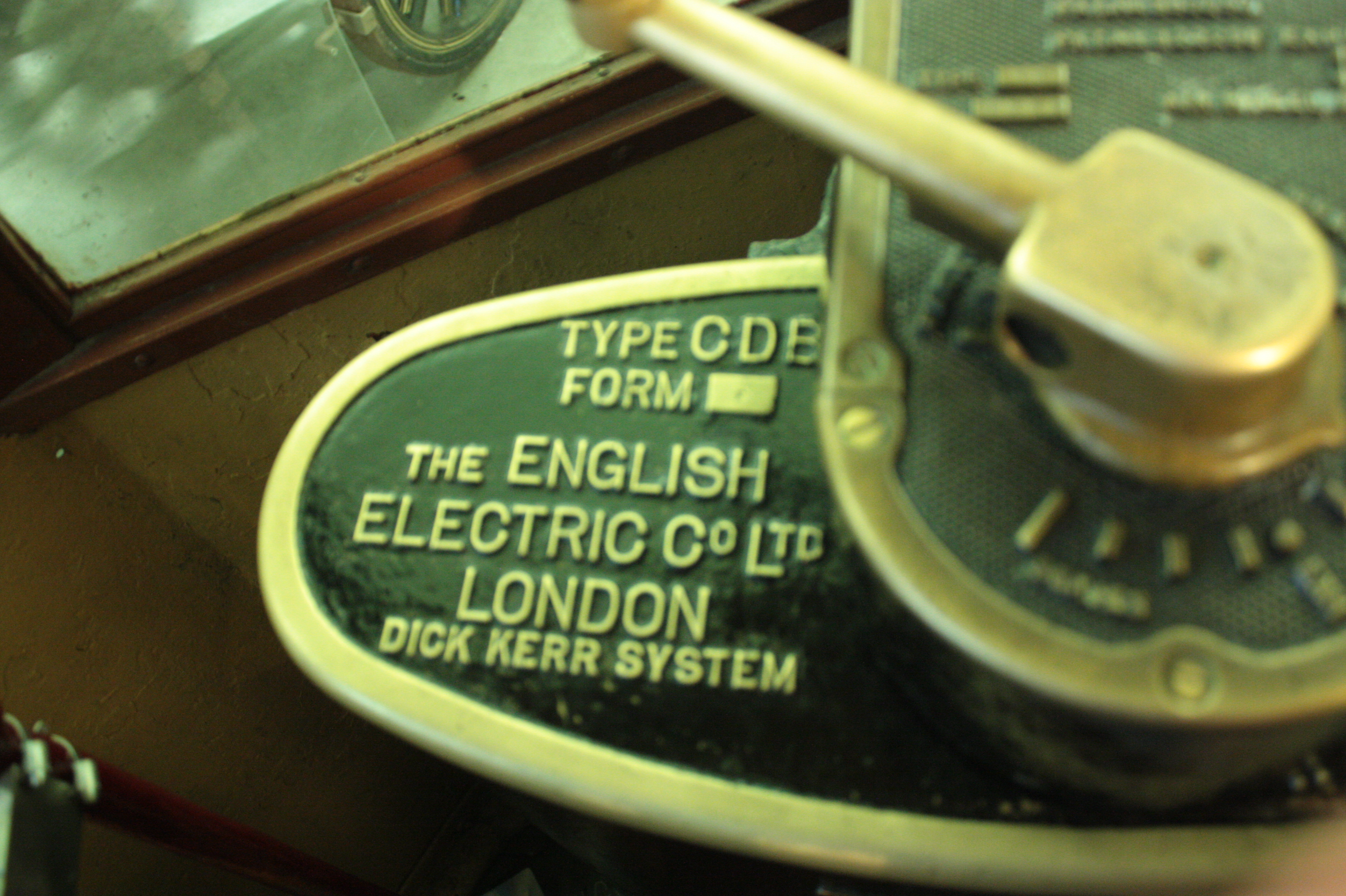
Dick, Kerr controls on a Glasgow tram

In 1902 the bulk of the capital of the English Electric Manufacturing Co was acquired, and the capital of that company largely increased, which gave Dick, Kerr and Co a factory at Preston. In the same year, the company was a major exhibitor at the Second International Tramways and Light Railways Exhibition in London.

In 1904 Dick, Kerr and Co. were contractors for the Lancashire and Yorkshire Railway's electrification. From 1904 to 1912, the company supplied first generation tram cars to Hong Kong Tramways. The 60 single deck cars were retired in 1935. In 1910 they began construction of steam turbines under the Bergmann patents, and one year later built a lamp factory at Preston, to make metal filament lamps.

Dick, Kerr supplied the Municipal Council of Sydney with eleven alternators for its Sydney Electric Lighting Station between 1904 and 1914.

== The First World War ==
Dick, Kerr Petrol-Electric Locomotive with the covers removed

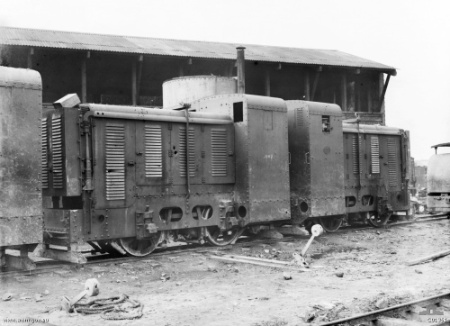
Dick, Kerr Petrol-Electric Locomotives at Ypres, 1917

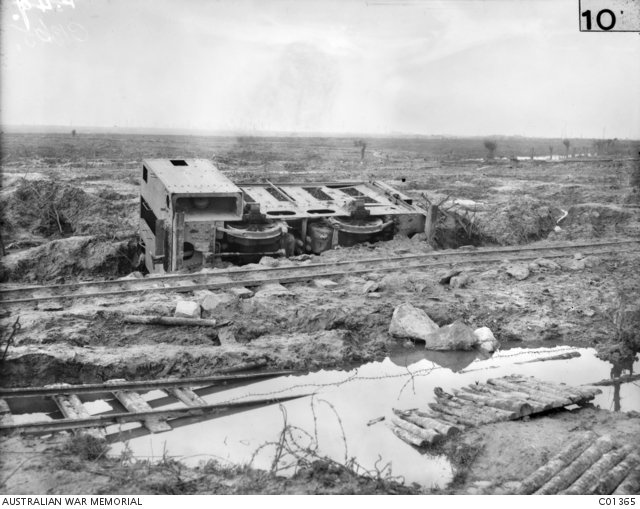
Stability on uneven tracks was not as good as the Motor Rail tractors

During the First World War the company was converted to a munitions factory. The company also made aircraft, to designs from the Seaplane Experimental Station, Felixstowe.

They also produced 100 petrol-electric locomotives for the War Department Light Railways. These locomotives weighed 7 tons and had a 45 hp Dorman 4JO four-cylinder petrol engine driving a 30 kW DC generator at 1000 rpm. This supplied current at up to 500 volts to 2 traction-motors driving the 32 inch wheels via a 6.68:1 reduction gear. The motors had an hourly rating of 25 hp, allowing the locomotive to haul 100tons at 5.2 mph. The two motors were run in parallel, with speed control by altering the generator voltage, and either motor could be cut out in event of a failure.

The generator also offered electric starting of the petrol engine by connecting to another locomotive, and the locomotives could also be used as mobile generators. In a parallel order 100 similarly rated locomotives were made by British Westinghouse, who were probably the original designers, though the DC generator/DC motor speed control mechanism is an early example of the application of a Ward Leonard control system (Harry Ward Leonard patented its application to vehicles in 1903). The selection of this drive system was in part because the War Department had originally considered using overhead electric as an alternative way of powering the locomotives, but it was subsequently decided this was not practical.

Dick, Kerr supplied the New South Wales Railways and Tramways (NSWR&T) with 25 cycle alternators for use in Ultimo Power Station and White Bay Power Station, which were commissioned from 1913 to 1918.

In 1917, they acquired the United Electric Car Company of Preston.

== Post War ==
Towards the end of the war the company took steps to change from a war footing to a peacetime one, which included the takeover of Willans and Robinson, and the United Electric Car Company, which were completed by November 1918 - they had also cemented an alliance with Siemens Brothers & Co Ltd, and established companies in France and Japan in connection with railway and tramway products. Seeking new and well equipped engineering capability they had reached an agreement with Coventry Ordnance Works Ltd.

In 1919, the Britannia works in Kilmarnock was sold to the Kilmarnock Engineering Company, who according to their 1925 advert produced steam, electric and petrol locomotives as well as mining gear, rails, points, crossings, and rolling stock. Although they were in production until at least the mid-1930s, few if any of their locomotives and other products survive.

At the same time as Kilmarnock Engineering Co took over the Britannia Works, Dick, Kerr & Co was merged into a new combine named the English Electric Company Ltd, which as a result held Dick, Kerr; the Coventry Ordnance Works; the Phoenix Dynamo Manufacturing Company; the United Electric Car Company; and Willans & Robinson Ltd. In November 1919, English Electric bought the Stafford works of Siemens Brothers Dynamo Works Ltd.

The absorbed companies retained much of their original structure, and the English Electric Company advertised itself in 1920 as a specialised manufacturer of electrical machinery at:

- Dick, Kerr Works, Preston
- Ordnance Works, Coventry
- Phoenix Works, Bradford
- Siemens Works, Stafford
- Willans Works, Rugby

The Dick, Kerr name was kept for the works in Preston until well into the 1950s.

== Surviving Dick, Kerr products ==
=== Locomotives ===
Dick, Kerr locomotives known to have survived:

- 600 mm (1 ft 11 5/8 in) gauge 4wPE from 1917, at the Tacot de Lacs, France
- 600 mm (1 ft 11 5/8 in) gauge 4wPE from 1918, at the Vale of Rheidol Railway, Aberystwyth, UK
- 2 ft (610 mm) gauge 0-4-2T "Gresham" of 1910 (Builder's Number unknown), ex Marian Mill #3, Queensland, plinthed in Pioneer Shire Council Park, Seaforth 1964. Now privately owned and stored at Echuca, Victoria pending restoration
- 2 ft (610 mm) gauge 0-4-0T "Valdora" of 1893 (Builder's Number unknown), Racecourse Mill then to Moreton Mill in 1937, Queensland. Plinthed 1964 - on display at Nambour, Queensland
- 2 ft 6 in (762 mm) gauge 0-4-2T MTR No.2 of 1910 (Builder's Number unknown), built for the Karachi Port Trust, then worked at the Marala Timber Depot (1917–1922) before finally coming to the Creosating Plant at Dilwan on the Northern Railway of India. The locomotive was modified by the Amritsar Workshops in 2000 and is now preserved in non-working order at the National Rail Museum, New Delhi
- 2 ft 6 in (762 mm) gauge 0-4-2T MTR No.1 of 1910 (Builder's Number unknown), presumably also built for the Karachi Port Trust, then worked at the Marala Timber Depot before finally coming to the Northern Railway of India. The locomotive was renovated by the Amritsar Workshops in September 1990 and is now plinthed at the entrance to the General Manager's Office of the Northern Railway of India, Baroda House, New Delhi.

=== Trams ===
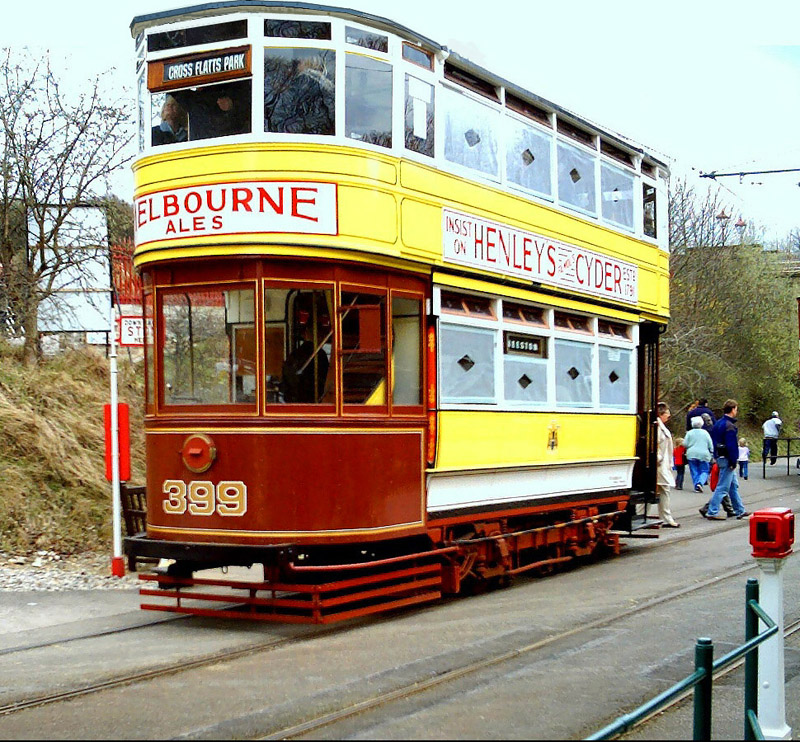
A Dick, Kerr Type Tram from the Leeds Tramway at the National Tramway Museum, Crich

Dick, Kerr trams known to have survived:

- Electric Tram 19 – Built in circa 1901. This narrow-gauge open-top double-decker tram, probably ran on the Dudley-Stourbridge route. Stored at the Black Country Living Museum
- Leicester 76 - Leicester City Tramcar 76 saw service from 1904 to 1947, after which it was used as a cricket pavilion. The tramcar arrived at the National Tramway Museum in 1960 and has been fully restored.
- Sóller-Port tramway, Majorca
- Kolkata, West Bengal, India
- Lisbon tram series 400-474, built in 1901 by the St. Louis Car Company, equipped with controllers supplied by Dick, Kerr & Co.; as of 2020 survive numbers 436 (in Portland), 435, 437, 441, 444, and 446 (in Portugal). Lisbon “caixote” cars of series 403÷610, rebodied locally in 1960-1961 partly based on some of those 400-474 cars with inherited controllers; as of 2014, number 442 is known to have survived.

=== Other Products ===
An example of the unusual 6-stroke Griffin gas engine manufactured by Dick, Kerr & Co is on display at the Anson Engine Museum.

A V-skip railway truck of 2 foot gauge manufactured by Dick, Kerr & Co is preserved at the Moseley Railway Trust.

== See also ==
- Dick, Kerr's Ladies F.C.
- Hick, Hargreaves & Co. Ltd
- Dick, Kerr Type Tram
- National Tramway Museum
