= Leeds City Tramways VAMBAC No. 602 =

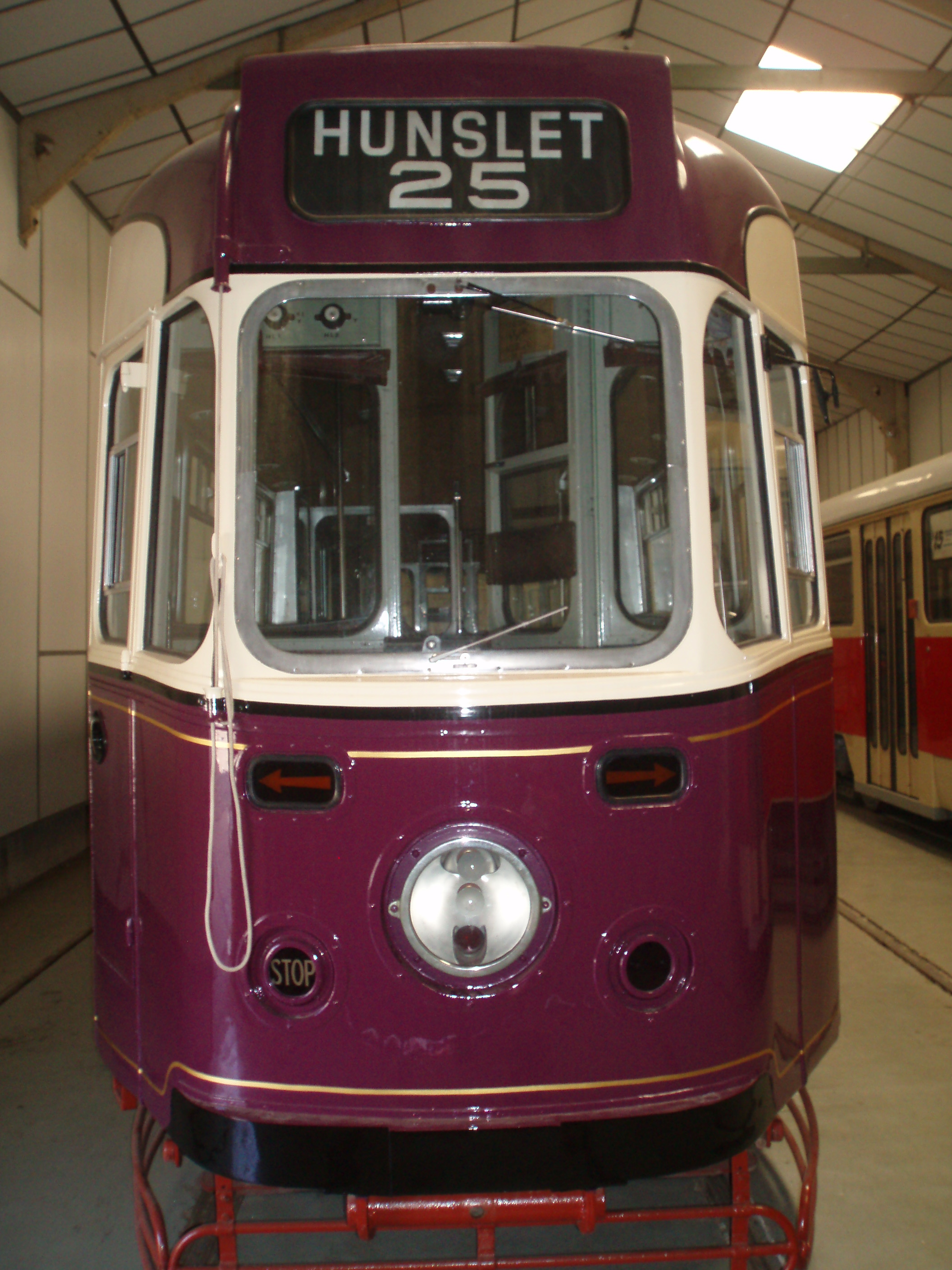

Leeds 602 is an experimental tramcar built for Leeds Corporation Tramways in 1953. It operated in its home city until 1957, when it was acquired for preservation at the National Tramway Museum in Crich, Derbyshire. It currently on display in the museum's Exhibition Hall.

The tramcar is the only vehicle at Crich to use VAMBAC (Variable Automatic Multinotch Braking and Acceleration Control), and one of only four in the country - two of which are at Blackpool, and the other being at the East Anglia Transport Museum.

== History ==
Leeds 602 was one of three experimental tramcars built for Leeds City Tramways, the others being Leeds 600, and Leeds 601. Car 602 entered service on 1 June 1953, and was built by bus manufacturer Charles H Roe. The design of 602 owes a lot to the Glasgow Cunarders and Coronations, because the General Manager of Leeds at the time was A. B. Findlay, who did at one stage produce drawings of a single-decker Cunarder. Findlay used these ideas to build two identical prototypes (601 and 602), and Leeds 602 was fitted with VAMBAC equipment under the Bow Collector. In addition, all its fittings are electrical, making it a very complicated tram.

602's service life was spent working the Hunslet Route around Leeds - the blind for which can be seen in the picture - and it was here until the end of its working life, when it was withdrawn in 1957. It was then acquired for preservation at the National Tramway Museum. Leeds 601 was also preserved, but was destroyed soon after in an arson attack.

== Preservation ==
At Crich, car 602 was used in service between 1967 and 1972, before its first workshop attention in 1973. It saw further use in 1974–5, and returned to the workshop in 1977. It was back in the fleet for the 1979–80 seasons, before having a third bout of workshop attention in 1986. Following this it had a longer operational life between 1987 and 1995, but it was finally withdrawn due to the discovery of a leaking roof. It was resurrected on a limited-use basis for the Tramathon in 2003, and then it was withdrawn to have attention to its leaky roof. This was finally fixed, and a long-needed repaint was undertaken. It returned for the Tramathon and Enthusiast's Day in 2005, and was used for six days in 2006. One of which was the enthusiast's day, which allowed the opportunity to ride both a bus and tram built by Charles H. Roe. The tram has not been used since, and now stands on display in the Exhibition Hall.
