= Trolleybuses in Leeds =

Transportation system

Leeds trolleybus system
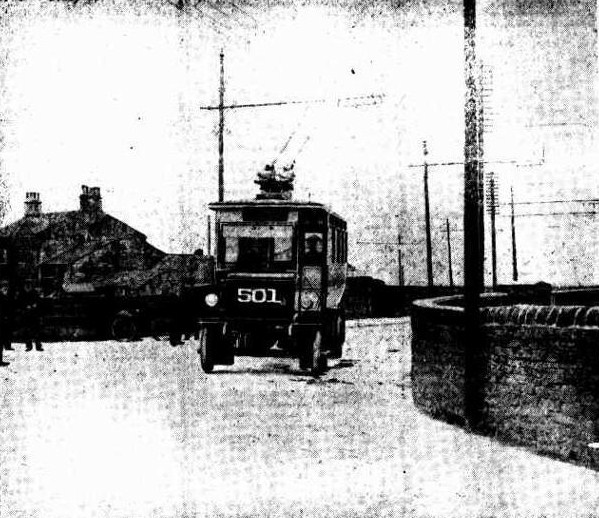
- An original Leeds trolleybus, ca. 1912.

Operation
- Locale: Leeds, West Riding of Yorkshire, England

Statistics
Twentieth century era: 1911–1928
- Status: Closed
- Routes: Leeds–Farnley; Guiseley–Otley/Burley-in-Wharfedale
- Electrification: V DC parallel overhead lines
- Depots: Kirkstall Road; Guiseley
Twenty-first century era: NGT
- Status: Cancelled
- Routes: 3
- Operator: New Generation Transport
- Electrification: V DC parallel overhead lines
- Route length: 14 km (8.7 mi)
- 7-8 million (targeted for 2020)
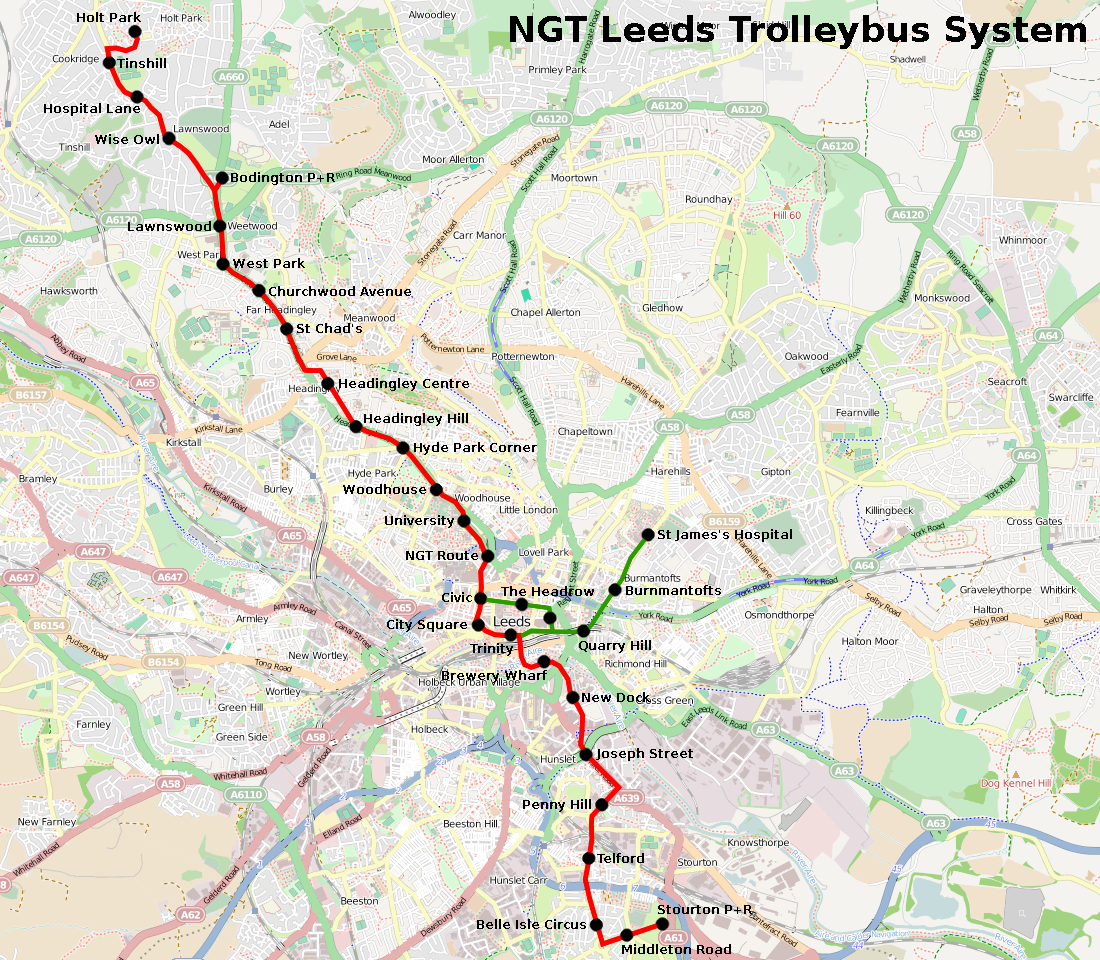
- Website: New Generation Transport

The Leeds trolleybus system served the West Riding of Yorkshire city of Leeds in England between 1911 and 1928. In May 2016, plans to construct a new system, the New Generation Transport (NGT) project, were refused approval from the UK Department for Transport, following a negative report from the planning inquiry.

The original system was one of the first two trolleybus systems in the United Kingdom, along with Bradford. Both systems commenced operation on 20 June 1911, but public service in Bradford did not start until four days later. The Leeds system had three routes, and closed on 26 July 1928.

== Twentieth century routes ==
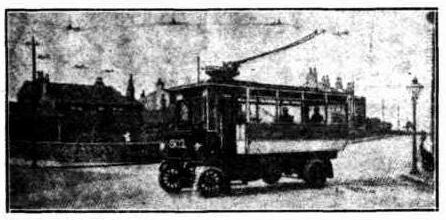
An original Leeds trolleybus, ca. 1912.

The original Leeds route, operated by Leeds Tramways, was from City Square to Moor Top via Lower Wortley and Farnley.

The route was launched at Thirsk Row, off Wellington Street on 20 June 1911. The first of two buses to set off on the first official run was driven by the Lord Mayor, William Middlebrook, and the second by his deputy, Frederick James Kitson. Both buses went on a round trip to Farnley, four miles from Leeds, returning 45 minutes later.

When the original route commenced operation, it had four trolleybuses. They were manufactured by the Railless Electric Traction Company, and powered by Siemens motors. They had solid rubber tyres and carried 28 passengers, who paid their fares when boarding. Known officially as "trackless cars" to distinguish them from trams, they ran on rural routes, to which trams were not suited.

In 1915 two further routes were opened, unconnected to the first route and operated from an existing tram depot at Guiseley, constructed from stone, which still exists. These were feeder routes to the tram system.

The three routes were:

- Leeds–Lower Wortley–Farnley–Moor Top, opened 20 June 1911;
- Guiseley–Otley, opened 9 September 1915;
- Guiseley–Burley-in-Wharfedale, opened 22 October 1915.

The system was not hugely successful. There was controversy between Leeds Corporation and the various councils over several issues relating to its operation. As time passed, internal combustion engined buses became more competitive. They soon replaced the trolleybuses, which closed on 26 July 1928.

== Proposed NGT system ==
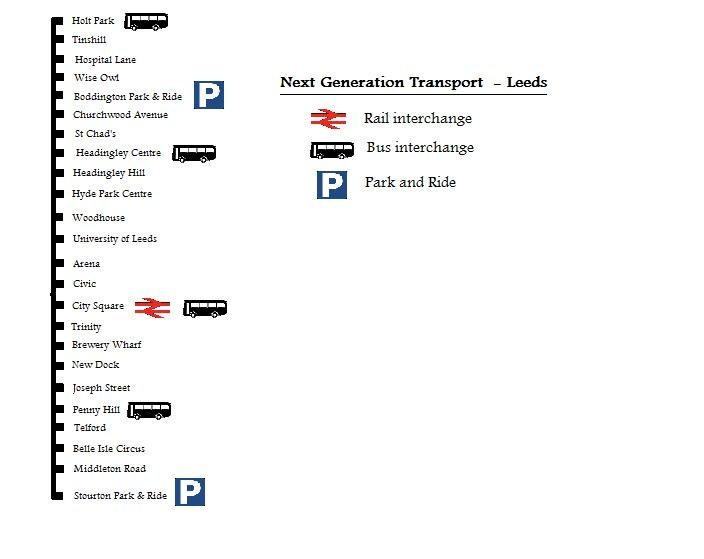
Map of the proposed system

Following the failure of plans for a Leeds Supertram network, which was rejected by the Department of Transport as being too costly in November 2005, the public transport provider Metro proposed the construction of an electric bus network, at an estimated cost of £300 million. The trolleybus system would be similar to that operating in the French city of Lyon, and gained support from the Regional Transport Board in June 2007.

=== Proposed vehicles ===
The NGT trolleybus vehicles would likely have been single-articulated single-deck vehicles with multiple doors (typically three or four sets). They would have been fully DDA-compliant with low floors to allow through movement by wheelchair users and those with pushchairs and prams.

=== Proposed routes ===
Three initial routes were planned, to north, south and east Leeds:

- North route - from a new park & ride site at Bodington (up to 800 spaces) to Leeds city centre;
- South route - from a new park & ride site at Stourton (up to 2,200 spaces) to Leeds city centre; and
- East route - from Leeds city centre to St James's Hospital. This route was later withdrawn from the proposals.

=== Proposed demolition ===
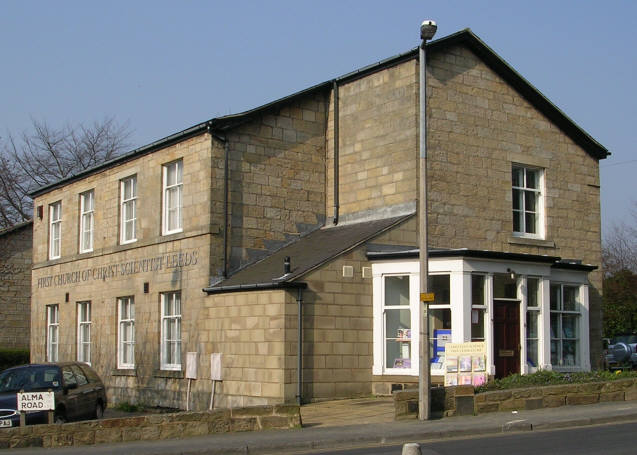
The former First Church of Christ Scientist building in Headingley was set to be demolished to make way for the Trolleybus.

Several buildings were set to be demolished to accommodate the scheme, all of these lie on the Northern leg of the route. The buildings are as follows:

- A parade of eight shops at Hyde Park Corner
- A former stable block and lodge building at the former Leeds Girls High School
- A terrace block within Headingley Business Park, between Headingley Lane and Victoria Road
- A residential brick built villa on Wood Lane, Headingley
- The former First Church of Christ Scientist building on Alma Road, Headingley which is currently used as offices
- Changing rooms and a groundsmans' cottage at the University of Leeds site in Weetwood

=== Progress of the NGT proposal ===
A 'Major Scheme Business Case' was submitted to the Department for Transport in October 2009 In March 2010, the Government announced that the proposal had been awarded 'Programme Entry Approval'.

Funding was approved for the North Route to Bodington and an extension to Holt Park, the South Route to Stourton and a section of the city centre loop linking these two lines. The government did not approve funding for the East Route or a full city centre loop.

The DfT approved the Holt Park - Stourton route on 5 July 2012. The planned scheme was subject to a public Inquiry in 2014. Following a negative report from the public Inquiry, the proposed scheme was cancelled in May 2016.

== See also ==
- List of trolleybus systems in the United Kingdom
- Transport in Leeds
