= Transport in Leeds =

Road, rail and bus transportation in Leeds, England

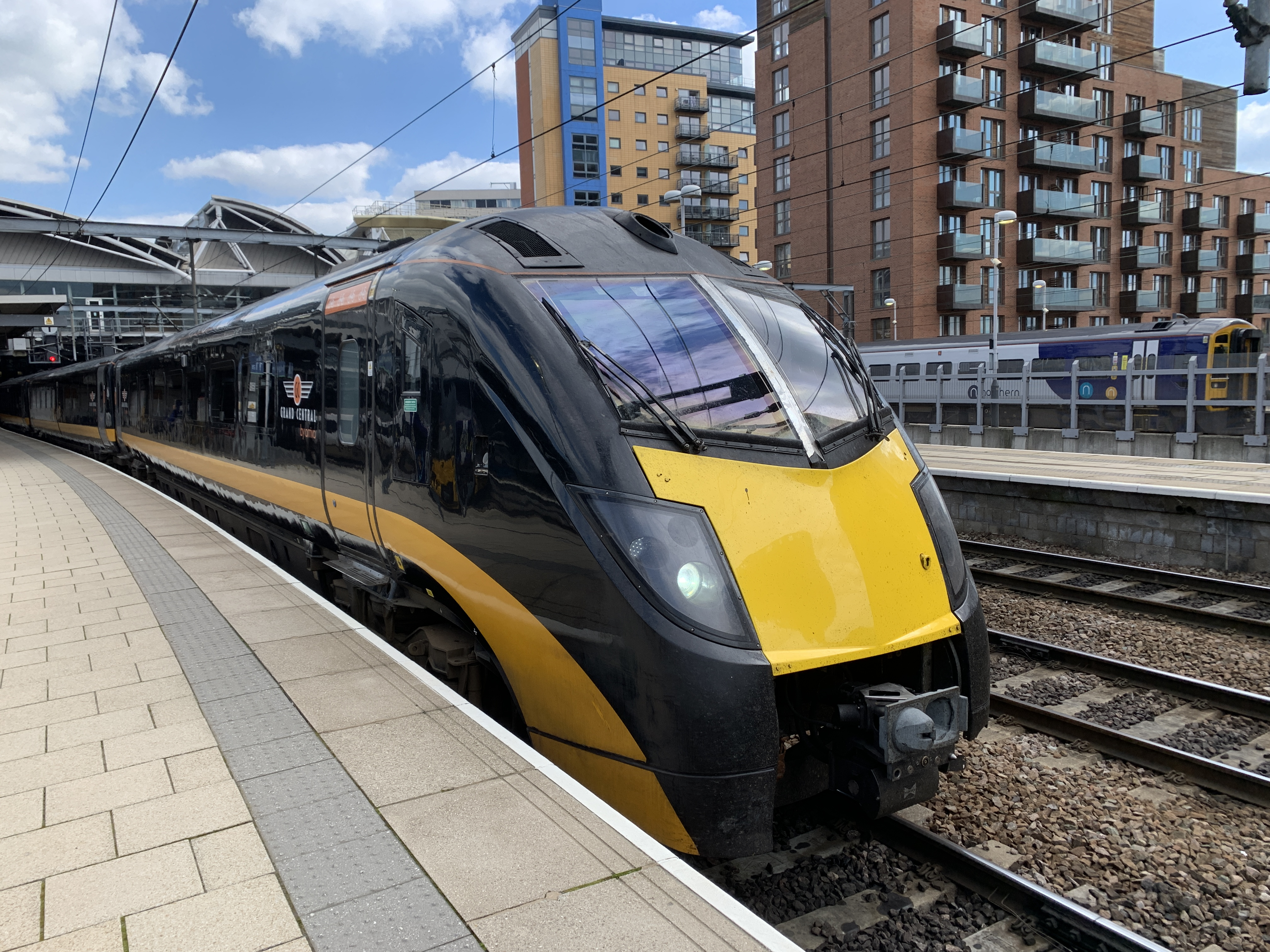
British Rail Class 180 at Leeds railway station

Transport in Leeds consists of extensive road, bus and rail networks in Leeds, West Yorkshire, England. Public transport in the Leeds area is coordinated and developed by West Yorkshire Metro. The city has good rail and road links to the rest of the country. Leeds railway station is one of the busiest in Britain, and Leeds is connected to the national road network via the A1(M) motorway, M1 motorway and M62 motorway. The city is served by Leeds Bradford Airport.

The main type of public transport in Leeds is bus services. Intracity services are mainly provided by First Leeds. Intercity services are provided by Arriva Yorkshire, First West Yorkshire and Transdev Blazefield to other areas in West Yorkshire, with Transdev also providing services further afield into the North Yorkshire areas of Harrogate, Scarborough, Whitby and York.

Leeds has less extensive public transport coverage than other UK cities of comparable size, and is among the largest cities in Europe without any form of light rail or rapid transit service. Plans are in place to improve public transport in Leeds, making it a car free city with upgrades to railway, bus services, and cycle lanes.

== Rail ==
Leeds railway station is one of the busiest in Britain.

The rail network is of great importance. Leeds railway station on New Station Street is one of the busiest in the UK outside central London, with around 1,000 trains serving more than 100,000 passengers who pass through the main ticket gates daily. Its modern interior provides connections to Birmingham, Bristol, Exeter, Newcastle via CrossCountry. Edinburgh and the north can be accessed via CrossCountry or London North Eastern Railway services to Aberdeen, although changes are often required at York or Newcastle. Manchester, Liverpool and the west are accessible by TransPennine Express, as are Scarborough and Hull in the east. There is a large commuter rail network co-ordinated by Metro and operated by Northern to many villages, towns and cities in the city region.

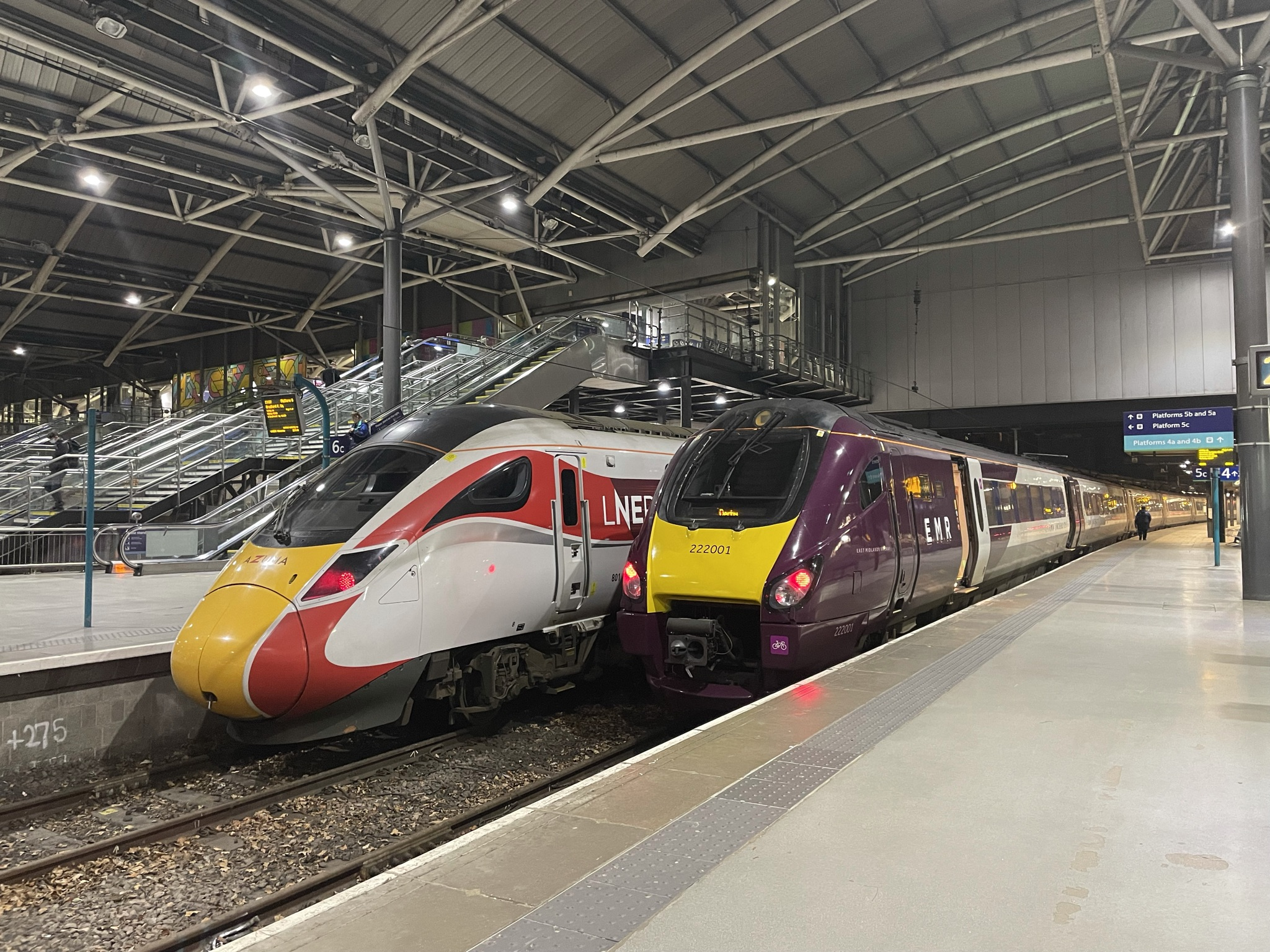
High-speed trains in Leeds

The station has 18 platforms, making it the largest in England outside London, and the second largest, after Edinburgh Waverley, in the UK, having been rebuilt from 12 platforms in 2001 at a cost of £265 million.

From Leeds, West Yorkshire Metro trains operated by Northern operate to all parts of West Yorkshire and surrounding local and commuter locations and other operators including CrossCountry, London North Eastern Railway and TransPennine Express operate services to the rest of the country.

The rail network in Leeds

=== Railway stations in Leeds ===
- Leeds
- Bramley
- Burley Park
- Cross Gates
- Cottingley
- East Garforth
- Garforth
- Guiseley
- Headingley
- Horsforth
- Kirkstall Forge
- Micklefield
- Morley
- New Pudsey
- Woodlesford

=== High Speed rail and Leeds New Lane ===
Publication of the proposed route of the second phase of High Speed 2 on 28 January 2013 revealed that the station at Leeds would be a new terminus called Leeds New Lane, connected to Leeds station by pedestrian walkways, possibly with moving walkways. However, following a review in November 2015, there have also been proposals to instead add the HS2 platforms as an extension to the existing Leeds station. On 18 November 2021 the UK government confirmed that the Leeds leg of HS2 would be scrapped, favouring instead investment in a mass transit system for Leeds and the wider region.

=== Middleton Steam Railway ===
The Middleton Steam Railway is the oldest continuously working railway system in the world. Originally built to transport coal from Middleton Colliery to Leeds, the railway is now a heritage piece. The railway effectively runs the length of Middleton Park, joining onto the national rail network at the northern end. The Middleton Steam Railway contains Leeds' only road level crossings (Moor Road and Tulip Street, Hunslet). There are two stations, Park Halt and Moor Road. The steam locomotives for the Middleton railway were made in Holbeck, near to the location of the present Leeds railway station.

== Roads ==
Leeds is the focus of the regional primary road network which includes A58, A61, A62, A63, A64 and A65 roads. It is also a principal hub of the national motorway network, with the M1 and M62 intersecting in the south east of the city and the A1(M) running along its eastern border. The M1 joins the A1(M) in east Leeds, creating a semi-orbital motorway consisting of the M62, M1 and A1(M) motorways around the south and east of the city. The M621 carries high volumes of traffic quickly in and out of central Leeds from the M62 and M1.

The Leeds city centre loop

The Inner Ring Road largely carries through traffic across the city, whereas the City Centre Loop distributes local traffic around the city centre. The City Centre Loop that was formed by using a number of streets to create a one way loop, however they will soon not be a continues loop around the city centre for cars as more roads get pedestrianized. This acts as a local access thoroughfare for city centre traffic, allowing the core centre to be heavily pedestrianised and largely traffic-free.

In 2017, Leeds had introduced a Clean Air Zone and provided financial support to businesses to promote the adoption of cleaner vehicles. This initiative, along with other measures, resulted in significant improvements in air quality. Leeds announced a Clean Air Zone in 2020, which will charge the most polluting buses, coaches HGVs £50 a day to enter the city, while taxis and private hire vehicles which are not clean enough will be charged £12.50 a day. The proposals came after the government ordered the council to come up with ways to lower the air pollution in the city.

The railway station has a dedicated public hire taxi rank that operates 24 hours a day.

=== Inner ring road ===
In the 1960s Leeds set about building the most ambitious ring road plan of any British city. The road is designated as a motorway, and describes a semicircle round the western, northern and eastern parts of the city centre. The road is elevated at its western and eastern ends but in cutting and tunnel to the north. This enabled a long stretch to be hidden underground.

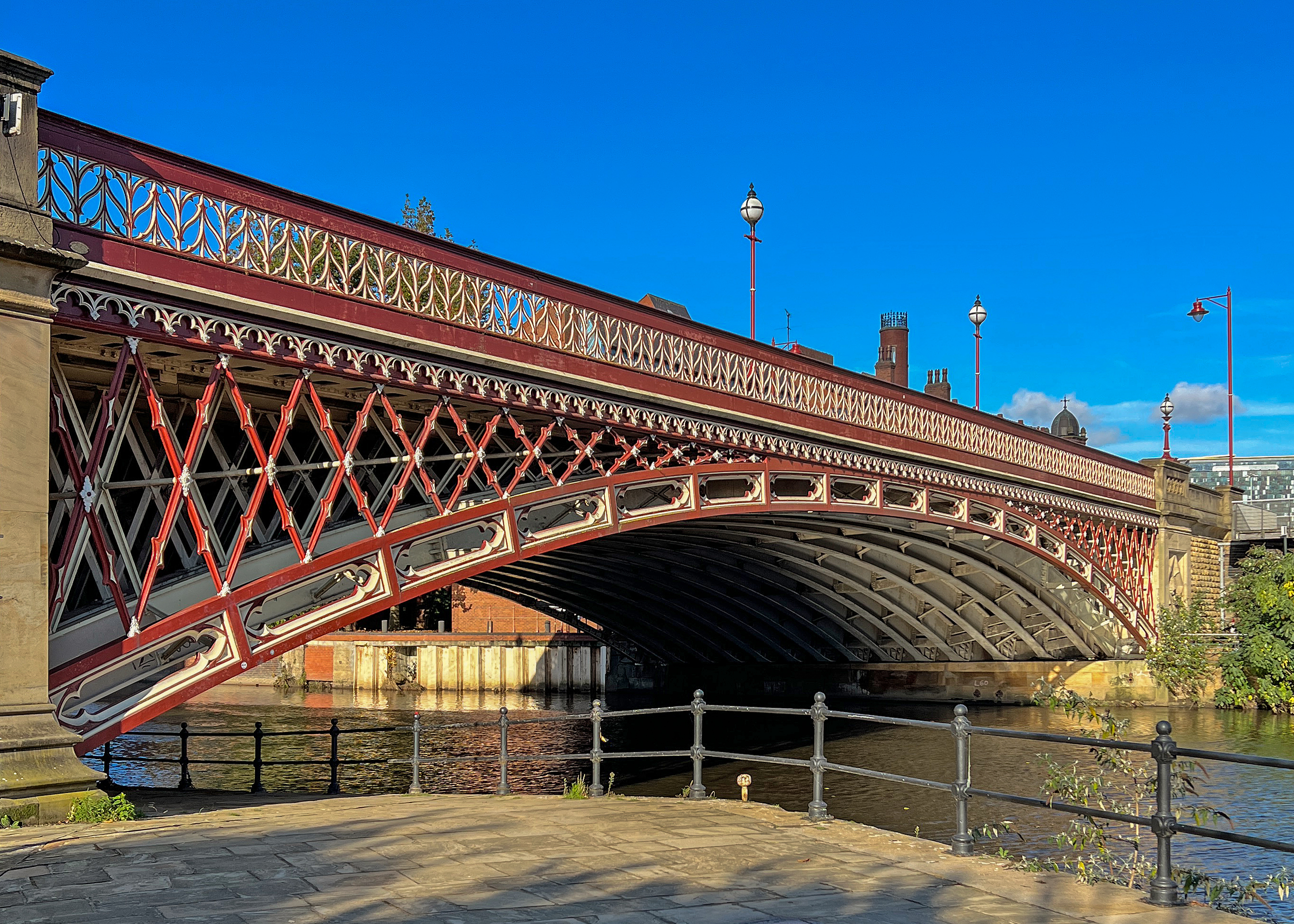
Crown Point Bridge, A653

Pedestrians may walk over it into the city centre, completely unaware of its presence. This gave Leeds City Council the idea to promote the city with the slogan Motorway City of the Seventies. The inner ring road is made up of the A58(M) from the Armley Gyratory continues as the A64(M) to Quarry Hill/Marsh Lane. (the number A58 forks off to the north at Clay Pit Lane and The A64 continues east as graded dual carriageway with a mix of grade separated and traffic light controlled junctions.) The Inner Ring Road junctions off and heads southwards under the Railway and join the A61 East Street/South Accommodation Road towards the East Bank. (Here, it meets the East Leeds Link Road (A63), which provides fast connections to the M1 junction 45 at Skelton Lake.) The IRR continues over the River Aire using the John Smeaton Viaduct as a high quality dual carriageway on a flyover, meeting the M621 at Junction 4 Hunslet. The M621 completes the southern flank of the Inner Ring Road, linking up to the A643 Ingram Distributor at M621 at Junction 2 Elland Road which joins back to the Armley Gyratory.

To manage traffic in the city centre and to provide an efficient traffic distributor around the city, inside the Inner Ring Road the city centre loop was created. This involved no actual engineering or construction work, but the remaking of the city's entire one way system.

One of the main advantages of the loop is its simplicity: whereas in other cities unfamiliar drivers may have to plan a route across the city's one way system or have to attempt map reading while driving, perhaps missing lanes and turnings, in Leeds the main body of city centre traffic is carried around the loop in a clockwise direction, and drivers can simply follow the signs and use the convenient junction numbers.

All loop signage is marked with the city centre loop logo, and each junction has a number and a name. The city centre loop connects the A58, A61, A64, A660, A65, A653 and A62 as well as smaller local routes. The route runs by Leeds railway station, the Merrion Centre, Quarry House, and Leeds General Infirmary as well as through the heart of the city's financial district.

=== Motorways and A roads ===
Leeds is served by the M1 and A1 heading South towards London and the East Midlands, the A1(M) heading north towards Newcastle upon Tyne and Edinburgh, the M62 heading both west towards Bradford, Manchester, Liverpool and the M62 and east towards Kingston upon Hull and the Port of Hull (this is a particularly important freight route).

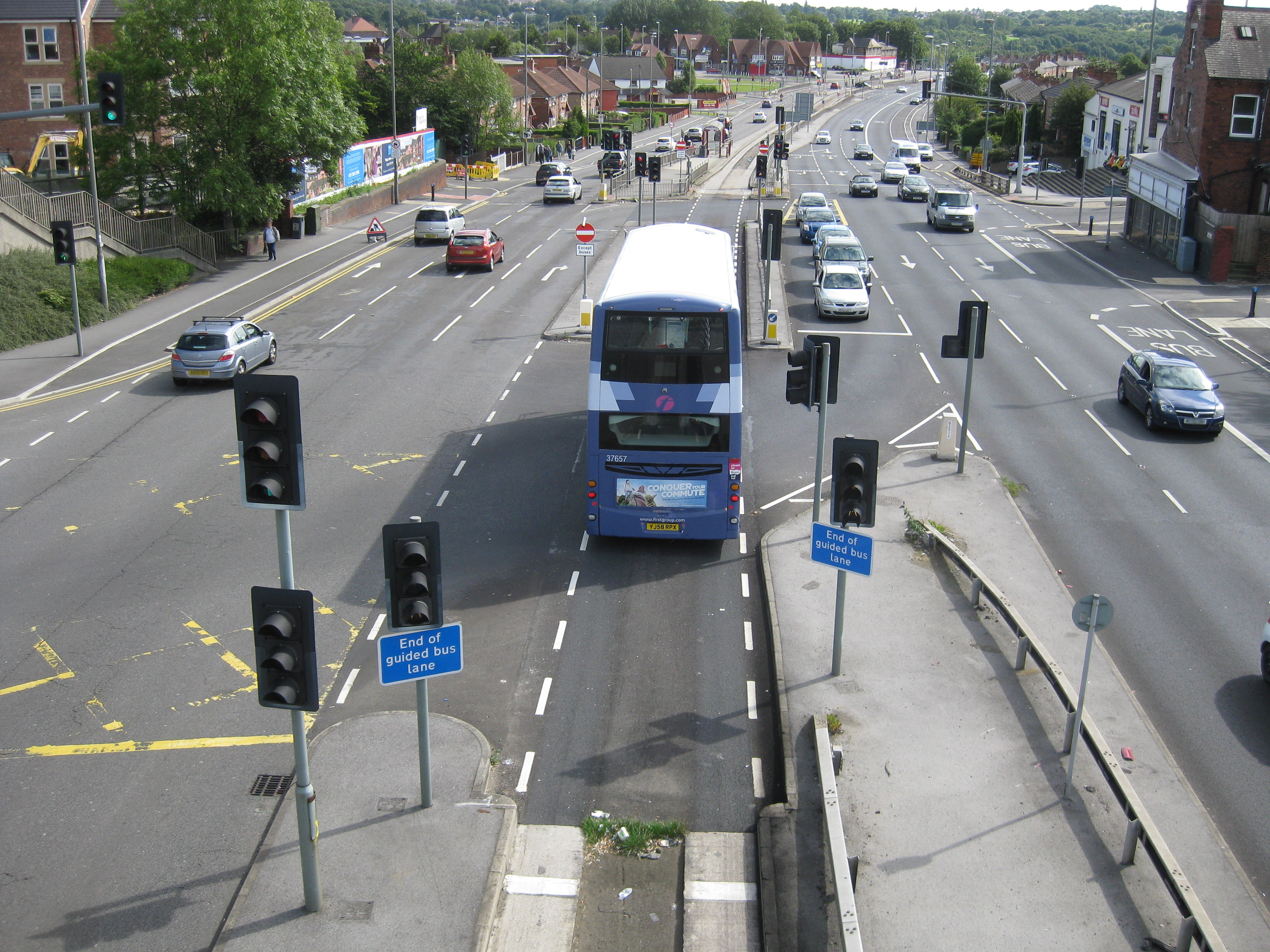
Guided bus lane on York Road

Away from motorways, a regional dual carriageway network meets in Leeds. The A64 is an important trunk road, heading as an unbroken dual carriageway to the outskirts of York and then on to Scarborough. Added to this, the A61 expressway to the north links the northern suburbs of Leeds to the city centre, and onto Harrogate and Ripon. The A660 and A65 dual carriageways link the commuter belts to the north west of the city and onto the Lancashire, meeting the A650. The A6110 expressway forms part of the Leeds Outer Ring Road and continues as dual carriageway southwards, connecting the areas south of the M62 to Leeds. The Outer Ring Road is designated as A6120 in the north of the city. To the north east of the city, the East Leeds Orbital Route being constructed by Balfour Beatty will take the Outer Ring Road away from existing residential areas and facilitate development of land as part of an East Leeds Extension project. Guided bus routes using kerb guidance operate on parts of the A61 (Scott Hall Road) and A64 (York Road).

The M621 is an internal urban motorway. Much of it is the former M1 (until it was diverted as the South East Leeds Orbital linking the M1 and A1(M)). The motorway begins at the M62 in Birstall, (near Ikea), and finishes where it merges with the M1 at Stourton. Since the M1 diversion the motorway has increased in length, previously it only ran from Birstall as far as the city centre. The M62 and M1 collectively create a part-orbital motorway around the south and east of the city.

=== Bus network ===
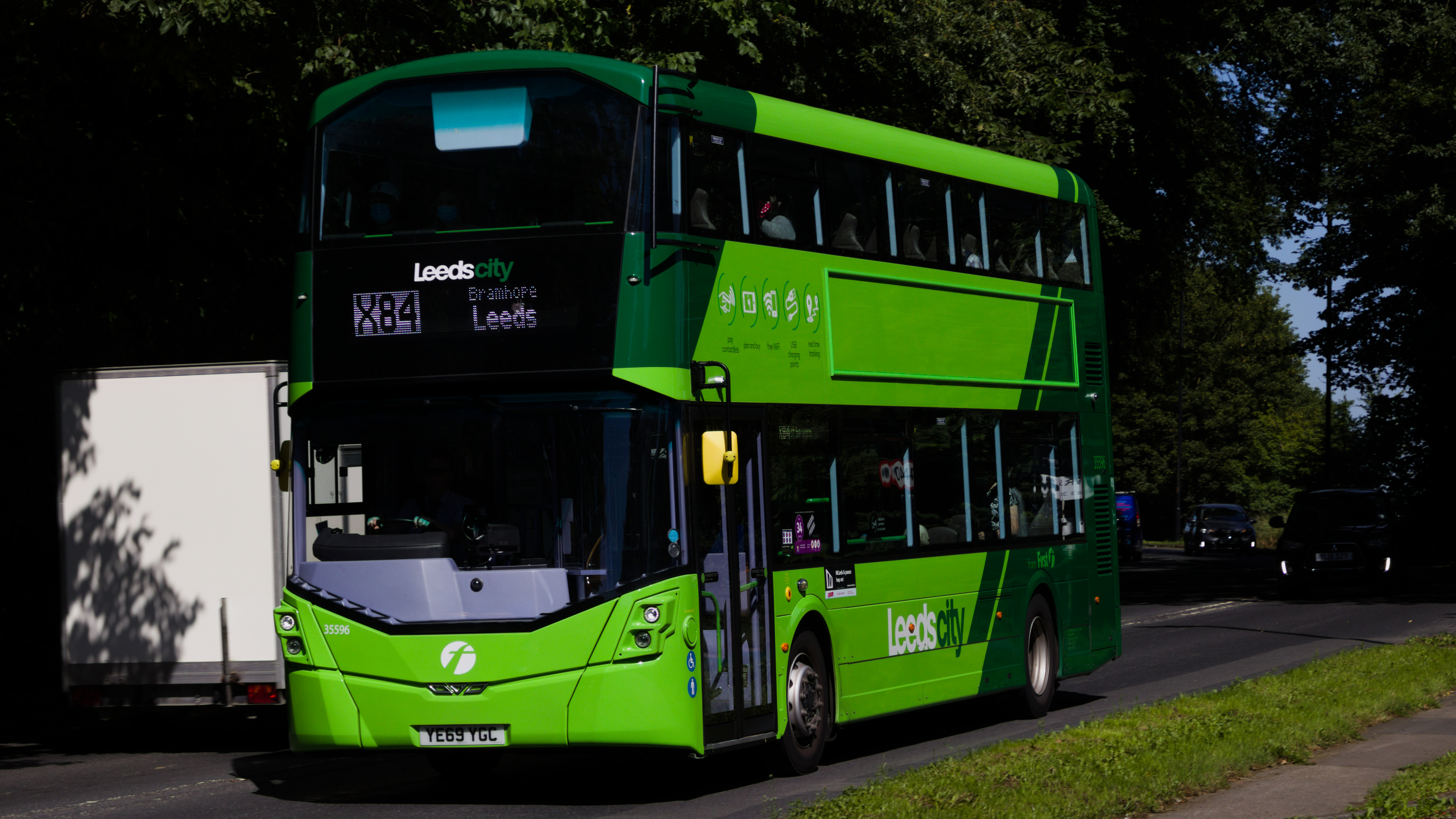
Bus networks are widespread throughout the city.

Leeds has an extensive bus network. The main provider of intracity services is First Leeds. Other smaller operators providing services in the city include Connexionsbuses, Station Coaches and Yorkshire Buses.

Intercity services to other towns/cities of West Yorkshire are mainly provided by Arriva Yorkshire, First Bradford, First Halifax, and Transdev-owned The Keighley Bus Company. A service to Leeds Bradford Airport is provided by Transdev's Flyer division.

Further services entering into North Yorkshire are mainly provided by Transdev, such as The 36 to Harrogate and Ripon, and Yorkshire Coastliner services to Scarborough and Whitby via York and Malton. Arriva Yorkshire also provides a service to Selby.

Leeds City bus station is the main hub for the city's bus services, and also long-distance coach services by National Express.

Leeds has a "public transport box" around a pedestrian core – these are clusters of bus stops on Eastgate, The Headrow, Park Row, Infirmary Street Boar Lane, Vicar Lane, Leeds Corn Exchange Albion Street, Cookridge Street, and outside the main entrance to the railway station for services linking the railway station with the rest of the city's public transport. In an attempt to simplify the bus network WYCA has introduced a core bus network map] and branding.

Leeds has three dedicated park and ride bus services to sites near motorways:

- PR1 – Elland Road (M621 junctions 1 and 2)
- PR2 – Temple Green (M1 junction 45)
- PR3 – Stourton (M621 junction 7)

In March 2024, the West Yorkshire Combined Authority announced that buses in Leeds are set to be operated under a publicly-controlled franchise system from March 2027.

== Cycling ==
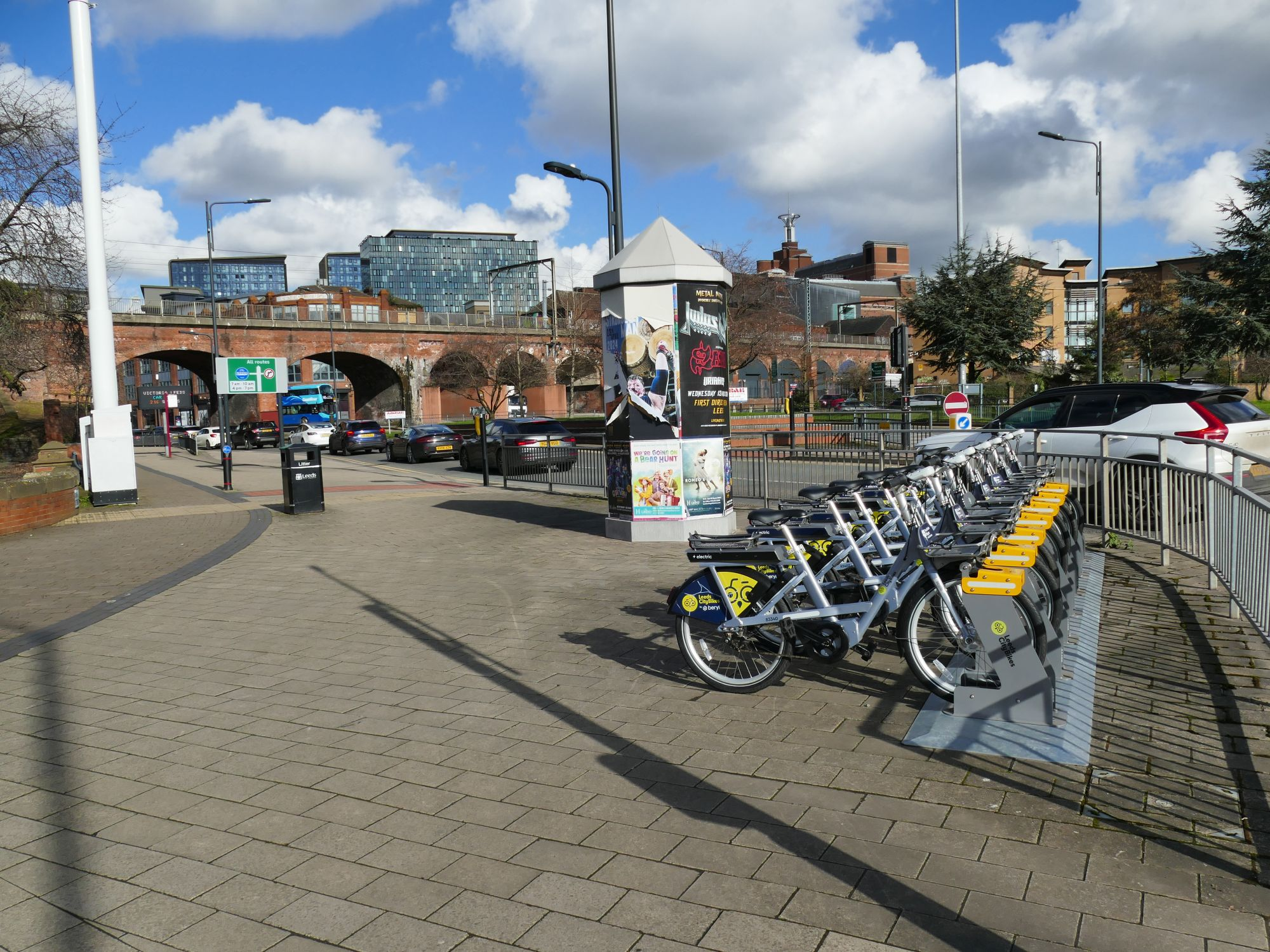
Leeds City Bikes ("Beryl Bikes") in Kirkgate in 2024

In 2010, Leeds Cyclepoint opened at Leeds railway station providing cycle hire by the day as well as paid secure parking for up to 300 cycles. The council provide maps showing ideal road routes for cyclists cycling maps. The Leeds Cycling Campaign works with the council and campaigns for improved cycling provision.

In late 2014 work started on Cycle City Connect, which includes a mostly segregated cycle path connecting Seacroft in East Leeds to Bradford, as well as resurfacing parts of the Leeds-Liverpool Canal shared use tow path. The government granted more money to Leeds, one example is £7.06 million under Transforming Cities Fund (TCF) to deliver improved and expanded cycle links and cycling routes in the city centre and beyond.

Since the 2014 Tour de France the number of publicly available bike lock-up rack has been increased, which includes high-capacity racks shaped like car outlines. Sustrans' National Cycle Network has several of its routes running through Leeds. These are the major routes 66 (between Manchester and York) and 67 (from Sheffield), as well as suburban routes 668 (from Alwoodley) and 677 (Wyke Beck Way).

An electric bicycle rental scheme, Leeds City Bikes, operated by Beryl, opened in September 2023. Users must download an app, and can pay on a one-off basis or buy a pass or a "bundle" of minutes as a regular customer. The bikes are collected from bays around the city centre, and hirers are penalised if they do not return the bike to one of the bays. The company is named after Leeds cyclist Beryl Burton. In the period from the scheme's launch until February 2024, 13,000 journeys were made totalling almost 36,000 km (22,000 mi). There were 200 bikes available from 20 bays. The number of bikes was planned to increase to 650 in spring of 2024.

== Walking ==
The Leeds Country Way is a waymarked circular walk of 62 miles (100 km) through the rural outskirts of the city, never more than 7 miles (11 km) from City Square. The Meanwood Valley Trail leads from Woodhouse Moor along Meanwood Beck to Golden Acre Park. The Leeds extension of the Dales Way follows the Meanwood Valley Trail before it branches off to head towards Ilkley and Windermere. Leeds is on the northern section of the Trans Pennine Trail for walkers and cyclists, and the towpath of the Leeds and Liverpool Canal is another popular walking and cycling route. The White Rose Way walking trail to Scarborough begins at City Square. In addition, there are many parks and public footpaths in both the urban and rural parts of Leeds, and The Ramblers' Association, YHA and other walking organisations offer sociable walks. The Ramblers' Association publish various booklets of walks in and around Leeds.

== Trams ==
Leeds' tram system was dismantled in the early 1950s (as was the case in most cities) with the final services running in November 1959. In recent years this decision has become regarded as short-sighted. The former tram routes are evident on some of the main roads in and out of the city; for instance the void in the A64 York Road, now filled with guided bus lanes, and the unusually wide central reservation between the carriageways on the A58 Easterly Road (towards Wetherby).

The original tram system ran a larger route than the proposed supertram; the original system ran along the A64, A58, A61, A660 and also down through Beeston and Belle Isle. By the time the tram network was dismantled it had become unpopular with many people in Leeds, due to its ageing, draughty and poorly maintained fleet. Neighbouring Bradford lost its trolley bus system during the same era (the final journey being made in 1972). Sheffield also lost its tram system several years earlier, yet has seen the return of the tram in the early 1990s.

== Air ==
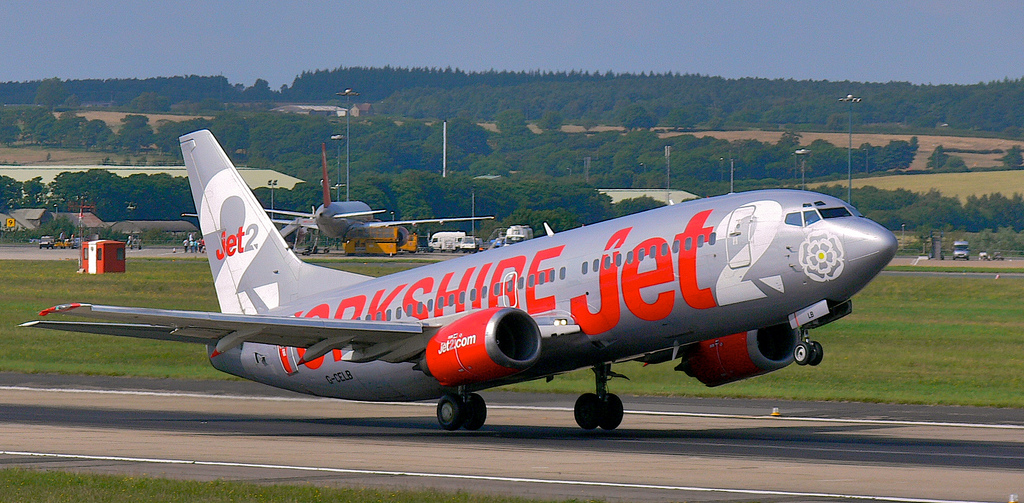
A Jet2 Boeing 737-300 taking off at Leeds Bradford Airport

Leeds Bradford Airport is located to the north-west of the city and has scheduled flights to destinations within Europe plus Egypt and Turkey. The airport is the largest in Yorkshire. Since the arrival of budget airline Jet2 (who chose Leeds Bradford as their base) the airport has experienced a considerable increase in passenger numbers. Jet 2 have operated seasonal (Christmas period ) services to and from New York City but there are no regular scheduled services between Leeds Bradford and the United States.

In 2007 the five metropolitan councils of West Yorkshire sold the airport to Bridgepoint Capital for in excess of £140 million. The new owners are currently drawing up an expansion plan. There is no railway station close to the airport, but there is a proposed parkway station located North of Horsforth and south of the Bramhope tunnel, With Access from Scotland Lane, due to open by 2024.

The airport is served by three direct bus services.

There is a direct rail service from Leeds station to Manchester Airport, the nearest airport with regular intercontinental flights, with trains running throughout the night. Doncaster Sheffield Airport, was 40 miles from Leeds, but closed in November 2022. Craven College operates an Aviation Academy based at the airport.

== Waterways ==
The Leeds and Liverpool Canal links the city to Liverpool and the west coast. The Aire and Calder Navigation links Leeds to the Humber and the east coast. The city has a dock, situated on both canals at Clarence Dock (adjacent to the Royal Armouries).

In 2014, a free river taxi service was introduced between Leeds Dock and Granary Wharf; operated by boats Twee and Drei.

== Transport information services for Leeds ==
Leeds City Council provides Leeds Travel Info, an online service of real-time travel information, including information about roadworks, traffic incidents, and car park availability for motorists as well as access to local public transport information. West Yorkshire Metro provides bus and train information online and offers the "My Next Bus" service of real-time bus information by text message or online. This real-time information is also displayed in certain bus shelters.

Leeds is one of the cities covered by the urban pedestrian route-planning system Walkit.com.

== See also ==
- Leeds
- Economy of Leeds
