= Walkit.com =

Walkit.com was an urban walking route planner which operated as a website and a mobile app.

== History ==
The site launched with coverage of central London in 2006. The cities of Edinburgh and Birmingham were added within the first year. The service expanded to cover Aberdeen, Aylesbury, Bolton, Bristol, Bury St Edmunds, Cambridge, Coventry, Derby, Glasgow, High Wycombe, Ipswich, Leeds, Lowestoft, Manchester, Middlesbrough, Newcastle and Gateshead, Norwich, Nottingham, Oldham, Portsmouth, Salford, Sheffield, Stockport, Sunderland, Trafford and Wigan, with an intended programme of launches in new cities and towns.

Walkit.com was independently owned and managed by a team of staff based in Birmingham, London and Norfolk.

As of October 2020 the website planning content was offline and the site in a parked state with advertising content only. A corporate database site lists the company as having dissolved in March 2014.

== Services ==
Walkit.com generated both A to B and circular routes, providing printable written directions and maps. As walkit.com was tailored to pedestrians, it included data that was omitted from many traditional vehicle-based journey planners, such as routes across parks, beside rivers and canals and along footpaths and alleyways. There was the option to select a 'less busy' route, which avoided main roads where possible. Some cities had additional features, such as step-free routes, hill profiles, and air-pollution-aware routes.

The site hosted a blog, an events page highlighting walking-related events in its featured cities, and information pages on walking for health, walking to work, walking to school and going green.

In 2010, personalised walkit accounts were launched in the form of mywalkit (free) and mywalkit+ (£1.50 per month/£15.00 annually). Subscribers to the mywalkit account were able to personalise their walking speed in order to provide more accurate walking statistics. The mywalkit+ account allowed subscribers to keep a log of their previous walks, as well as setting three different personalised speeds, and keep a record of their carbon savings.

Walkit allowed users to create 'link to us' widgets for their own sites, in order to promote walking. Widgets could be created for directions to or from particular destinations, between two locations, or for circular walks.

The company had a Facebook fan page (inactive since 2015) and group and a Twitter account (inactive since 2019).

== Awards ==
Walkit.com was both shortlisted for and received a number of awards.

These included one of "The Guardian's 100 top sites for 2009", one of "The Telegraph's 101 most useful websites of 2008" and one of "Time Out's 50 Best London Websites" in 2008.

Walkit was named the winner of the "Most Innovative Transport Project" at the National Transport Awards in 2008 , and shortlisted for both the "Ethical Business of the Year" by the Observer Ethical awards 2008 , and the "Media Guardian Innovation Awards" in 2008 .
