= First International Tramways and Light Railways Exhibition =

Exhibition in London held in 1900

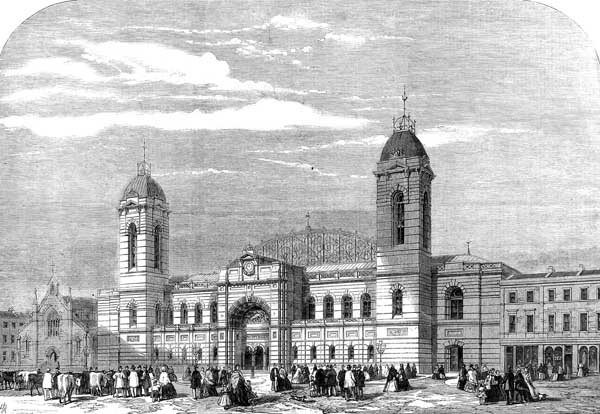
The Royal Agricultural Hall in 1861, seen from Liverpool Road.

The First International Tramways and Light Railways Exhibition was held in the Royal Agricultural Hall, Islington, London from 30 June 1900 – 11 July 1900.

The International Tramways and Light Railways Exhibition was promoted by "The Tramway and Railway World".

The exhibitors included:

- The Electric Tramways Equipment Company of Birmingham
- The Ohio Brass Company
- British Westinghouse Electric, which ran a full-sized double-decked car on track in the exhibition hall to demonstrate its third rail and conduit system.
- British Mannesman Tube Company, Showed traction, arc and trolley poles
- British Thomson-Houston
- Brush Electrical Engineering Company
- Brill Company
- Robert W. Blackwell and Company a large display of items related to electrically equipped vehicles and lines including poles, trolleys, insulators, trucks, conduits, fittings and an electric car to carry 53 passengers.
- Dick, Kerr & Co.
- Electric Railway and Tramway Carriage Works
- English Electric Manufacturing Company

Mr. O'Brien won the competition for reversible tramway seats.
