= Leeds Corporation Tramways =

Transit system serving Leeds, England

Leeds Tramway
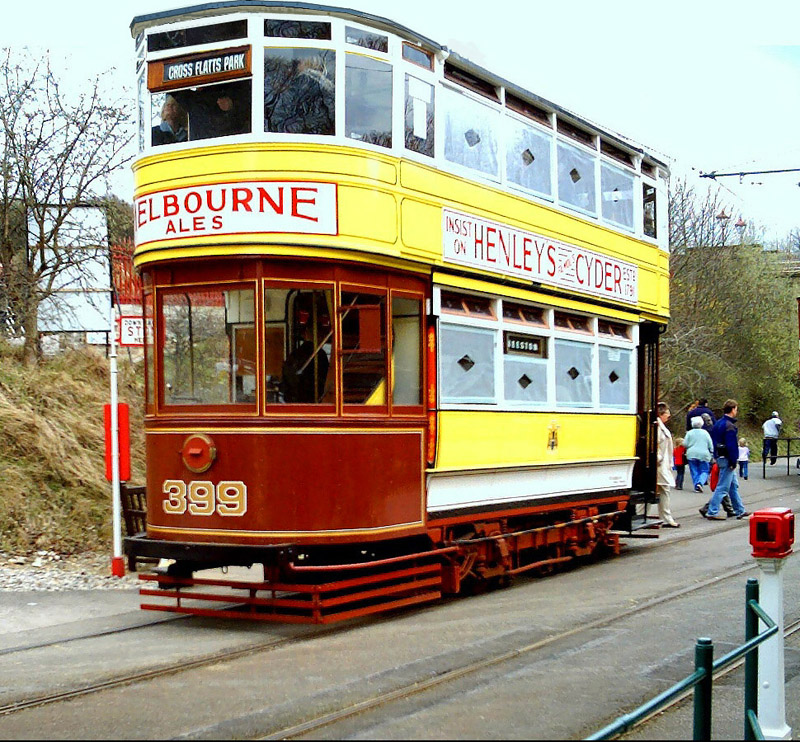
- A 1925 Leeds tram at the National Tramway Museum in Crich, Derbyshire

Overview
- Headquarters: Leeds
- Locale: England
- Dates of operation: 29 October 1891–7 November 1959
- Successor: Abandoned

Technical
- Track gauge: 4 ft 8 1/2 in (1,435 mm)
- Electrification: overhead catenary

Leeds Corporation Tramways formerly served the city of Leeds, England. The original trams were horse-drawn, but the city introduced Britain's first overhead-powered electric trams in 1891, and by 1901, electrification had been completed. The tramway opened on 29 October 1891.

== Routes ==
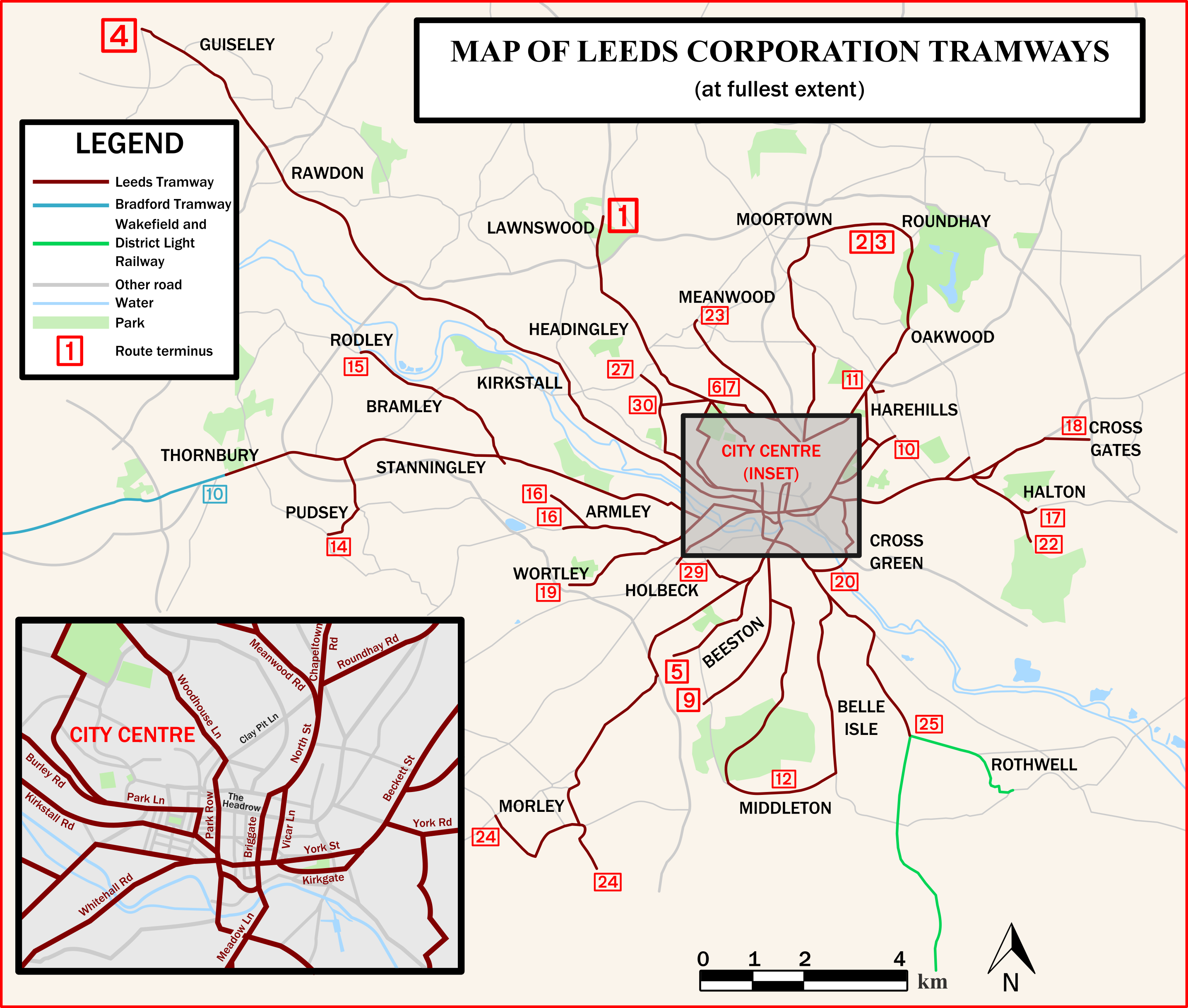
System map at fullest extent (click to expand)

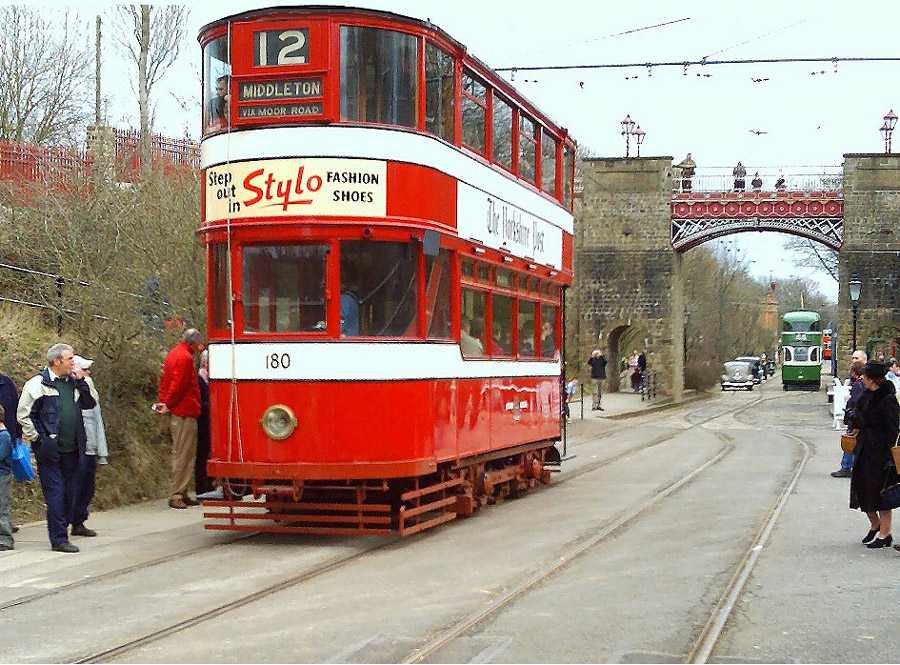
A 1931 Leeds tram, in the later red livery

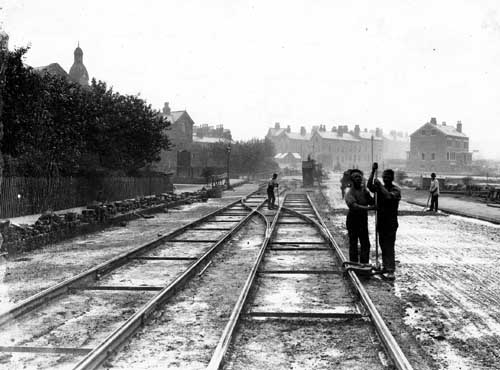
Construction of the Leeds Tramway on Roundhay Road, Harehills, Leeds

Leeds Tramway on Briggate.

There were several lines running between the city centre and Cross Gates, Chapel Allerton, Moortown, Roundhay, Middleton, Beeston, Armley, Hunslet and Kirkstall. The network, of which certain sections were on reserved track, was far more extensive than that of the proposed Leeds Supertram, which has not been built after a funding shortfall from central government.

== Trams ==
The earliest trams were single-decker horse-drawn trams, but later purchases were double-deckers, operated by Leeds Tramways Company. The last of these ran in 1901. Steam trams were also used until full electrification. Throughout most of the twentieth century, the tramway used a mixture of bus-style and balloon trams, both in double-decker formation. The system of collection by trams from the overhead wiring was unusual in that it used bow collectors rather than poles, obviating the need to turn the pole round at each terminus.

Even when other cities were abandoning their tramways in the 1940s, Leeds continued to modernise its system. Two prototype modern single-deck trams (somewhat similar to those used in continental European cities) were built in the early 1950s, receiving a purple-and-cream livery for the coronation, and operating on route 3 to Roundhay in 1953 – perhaps because this followed a segregated track along Roundhay Road to the popular attraction of Roundhay Park. These two were a conventional air-and-magnetic-braked vehicle (601) and an all-electric "vambac" car (602). The latter now resides in the Crich tramway museum along with an earlier experimental single-deck tram purchased from Sunderland. This was rebuilt as Leeds number 600 around the time 601 and 602 were built, but was painted in a red-and-cream livery.

In the early 1950s (1951), Leeds purchased 90 "Feltham" secondhand trams (dating from 1931), from London Transport. By this period, Leeds tramcars were normally painted in red.

== Closure ==
After the closure of the Leeds system on 7 November 1959, Sheffield became the last city in England operating trams (closing in 1960), with Glasgow (Scotland) the last in the UK (closing in 1962). The Blackpool tramway then became the UK's only commercial tramway, until the opening of the Manchester Metrolink in 1992.

It is argued that the closure of the tramway was shortsighted, particularly given the fact that the majority of the network ran on reserved track, and as such did not interfere with the road system. Leeds had one of largest and most advanced urban transport systems in the UK, and was developing new tramcars and opening new lines right until its closure. The people of Leeds have now tried multiple times since the 1980s to get their tramway back, with no success.

=== Queens Hall ===
Queens Hall was the central tram shed, situated off Swinegate. This was used as a concert hall from the trams closure until 1989, when it was demolished. Queens Hall became a renowned punk venue and hosted other artists such as Elton John. However, the venue's poor acoustics and high upkeep costs brought about its closure. The site is now various office buildings, bars and purpose built car park.

== Preservation ==
Several Leeds electric trams are now preserved at the National Tramway Museum at Crich; numbers 180, 345, 399, 600 and 602.

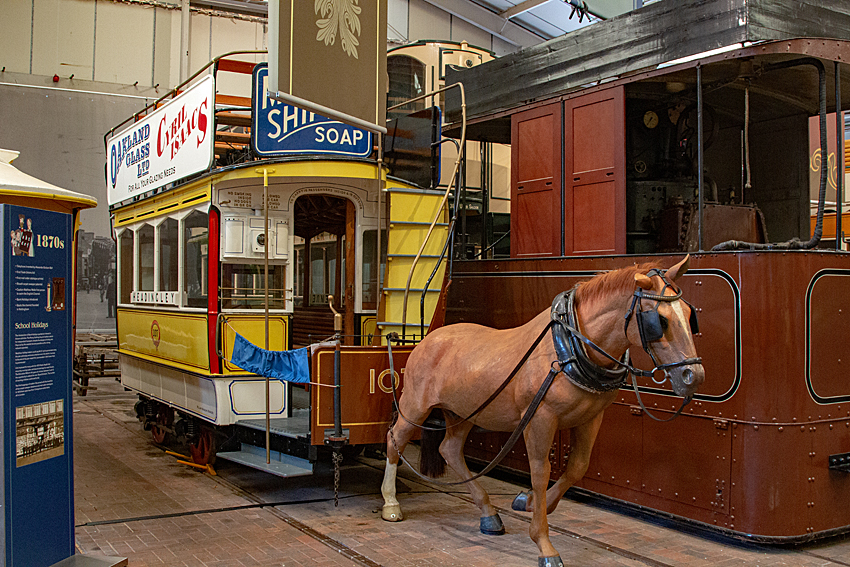
Leeds horse tram 107 at the National Tramway Museum

The last remaining Leeds horse tram, number 107, has been restored by the Leeds Transport Historical Society and is currently on display at Crich. The second of the two experimental single deck trams, number 602, is also preserved at a Crich along with a conversion from a Sunderland tram (Leeds 600). The other experimental single decker, 601, was preserved at the Middleton Railway along with tram 202 owned by Leeds Museums. These were, however, destroyed by vandalism and arson during 1962. Leeds Horsfield Tram No 160 and Feltham Tram No 517 also ended up stored at the Middleton Railway and suffered the same fate in 1968.

What were once commonly thought to have been original tram poles remaining in Roundhay were actually lighting standards in a bus park. There is an old electricity sub station used for the tramway on Abbey Road in Hawksworth.
