= List of acts of the Parliament of the United Kingdom from 1903 =

This is a complete list of acts of the Parliament of the United Kingdom for the year 1903.

Note that the first parliament of the United Kingdom was held in 1801; parliaments between 1707 and 1800 were either parliaments of Great Britain or of Ireland). For acts passed up until 1707, see the list of acts of the Parliament of England and the list of acts of the Parliament of Scotland. For acts passed from 1707 to 1800, see the list of acts of the Parliament of Great Britain. See also the list of acts of the Parliament of Ireland.

For acts of the devolved parliaments and assemblies in the United Kingdom, see the list of acts of the Scottish Parliament, the list of acts of the Northern Ireland Assembly, and the list of acts and measures of Senedd Cymru; see also the list of acts of the Parliament of Northern Ireland.

The number shown after each act's title is its chapter number. Acts passed before 1963 are cited using this number, preceded by the year(s) of the reign during which the relevant parliamentary session was held; thus the Union with Ireland Act 1800 is cited as "39 & 40 Geo. 3 c. 67", meaning the 67th act passed during the session that started in the 39th year of the reign of George III and which finished in the 40th year of that reign. Note that the modern convention is to use Arabic numerals in citations (thus "41 Geo. 3" rather than "41 Geo. III"). Acts of the last session of the Parliament of Great Britain and the first session of the Parliament of the United Kingdom are both cited as "41 Geo. 3". Acts passed from 1963 onwards are simply cited by calendar year and chapter number.

== 3 Edw. 7 ==
The fourth session of the 27th Parliament of the United Kingdom, which met from 17 February 1903 until 14 August 1903.

This session was also traditionally cited as 3 Ed. 7 or 3 E. 7.

=== Public general acts ===
| Short title | Citation | Royal assent |
Long title
| Bank Holiday (Ireland) Act 1903 (repealed) | 3 Edw. 7. c. 1 | 27 March 1903 |
An Act to make provision for a Bank Holiday in Ireland on the seventeenth day of every March. (Repealed by Banking and Financial Dealings Act 1971 (c. 80))
| Light Locomotives (Ireland) Act 1903 (repealed) | 3 Edw. 7. c. 2 | 27 March 1903 |
An Act to provide for the Authorisation of Races with Light Locomotives in Ireland. (Repealed by Statute Law Revision Act 1927 (17 & 18 Geo. 5. c. 42))
| Consolidated Fund (No. 1) Act 1903 (repealed) | 3 Edw. 7. c. 3 | 27 March 1903 |
An Act to apply certain sums out of the Consolidated Fund to the service of the years ending on the thirty-first day of March one thousand nine hundred and two, one thousand nine hundred and three, and one thousand nine hundred and four. (Repealed by Statute Law Revision Act 1927 (17 & 18 Geo. 5. c. 42))
| Army (Annual) Act 1903 (repealed) | 3 Edw. 7. c. 4 | 30 April 1903 |
An Act to provide, during Twelve Months, for the Discipline and Regulation of the Army. (Repealed by Statute Law Revision Act 1927 (17 & 18 Geo. 5. c. 42))
| Berwickshire County Town Act 1903 (repealed) | 3 Edw. 7. c. 5 | 30 June 1903 |
An Act to constitute the Town of Duns to be the Head Burgh or County Town of Berwickshire. (Repealed by Statute Law (Repeals) Act 1977 (c. 18))
| Naval Forces Act 1903 (repealed) | 3 Edw. 7. c. 6 | 30 June 1903 |
An Act to provide for the Constitution of a Royal Naval Volunteer Reserve, and a Force of Royal Marine Volunteers, and otherwise amend the Law relating to His Majesty's Naval Forces. (Repealed by Reserve Forces Act 1980 (c. 9))
| Coal Mines Regulation Act (1887) Amendment Act 1903 (repealed) | 3 Edw. 7. c. 7 | 30 June 1903 |
An Act to amend the Coal Mines Regulation Act, 1887. (Note: Coal Mines Regulation Act 1887 (50 & 51 Vict. c. 58)) (Repealed by Coal Mines Act 1911 (1 & 2 Geo. 5. c. 50))
| Finance Act 1903 (repealed) | 3 Edw. 7. c. 8 | 30 June 1903 |
An Act to grant certain duties of Customs and Inland Revenue, to alter other duties, and to amend the Law relating to Customs and Inland Revenue and the National Debt, and to make other provisions for the financial arrangements of the year. (Repealed by Finance Act 1905 (5 Edw. 7. c. 4), Statute Law Revision Act 1927 (17 & 18 Geo. 5. c. 42) and Statute Law Revision Act 1950 (14 Geo. 6. c. 6))
| County Councils (Bills in Parliament) Act 1903 (repealed) | 3 Edw. 7. c. 9 | 21 July 1903 |
An Act to empower County Councils to promote Bills in Parliament. (Repealed for England and Wales by Local Government Act 1933 (23 & 24 Geo. 5. c. 51), for London by London Government Act 1939 (2 & 3 Geo. 6. c. 40) and for Scotland by Local Government (Scotland) Act 1947 (10 & 11 Geo. 6. c. 43))
| Education (Provision of Working Balances) Act 1903 (repealed) | 3 Edw. 7. c. 10 | 21 July 1903 |
An Act to provide for the borrowing by Local Education Authorities for certain purposes. (Repealed by Education Act 1918 (8 & 9 Geo. 5. c. 39))
| Contracts (India Office) Act 1903 (repealed) | 3 Edw. 7. c. 11 | 21 July 1903 |
An Act to remove Doubts as to the Mode of Execution of certain Contracts entered into on behalf of the Secretary of State for India in Council. (Repealed by Government of India Act 1915 (5 & 6 Geo. 5. c. 61))
| Post Office (Money Orders) Act 1903 (repealed) | 3 Edw. 7. c. 12 | 21 July 1903 |
An Act to enable the Postmaster General to issue Postal Orders of the value of Twenty-one Shillings. (Repealed by Post Office Act 1908 (8 Edw. 7. c. 48))
| Elementary Education Amendment Act 1903 (repealed) | 3 Edw. 7. c. 13 | 21 July 1903 |
An Act to amend the Elementary Education (Defective and Epileptic Children) Act, 1899. (Note: Elementary Education (Defective and Epileptic Children) Act 1899 (62 & 63 Vict. c. 32)) (Repealed by Elementary Education (Defective and Epileptic Children) Act 1914 (4 & 5 Geo. 5. c. 45))
| Borough Funds Act 1903 (repealed) | 3 Edw. 7. c. 14 | 11 August 1903 |
An Act to amend the Borough Funds Act, 1872. (Note: Borough Funds Act 1872 (35 & 36 Vict. c. 91)) (Repealed by Local Government Act 1933 (23 & 24 Geo. 5. c. 51) and for London by London Government Act 1939 (2 & 3 Geo. 6. c. 40))
| Local Government (Transfer of Powers) Act 1903 (repealed) | 3 Edw. 7. c. 15 | 11 August 1903 |
An Act to amend section ten of the Local Government Act, 1888. (Note: Local Government Act 1888 (51 & 52 Vict. c. 41)) (Repealed by Local Government Act 1933 (23 & 24 Geo. 5. c. 51) and London Government Act 1939 (2 & 3 Geo. 6. c. 40))
| Public Offices Site (Dublin) Act 1903 | 3 Edw. 7. c. 16 | 11 August 1903 |
An Act for the acquisition of certain land in Dublin as a site for a proposed Royal College of Science and other offices and buildings for the public service, and for purposes connected therewith.
| Metropolitan Streets Act 1903 (repealed) | 3 Edw. 7. c. 17 | 11 August 1903 |
An Act to amend the Metropolitan Streets Act, 1867. (Note: Metropolitan Streets Act 1867 (30 & 31 Vict. c. 134)) (Repealed by London Government Act 1963 (c. 33))
| Pistols Act 1903 (repealed) | 3 Edw. 7. c. 18 | 11 August 1903 |
An Act to regulate the sale and use of Pistols or other Firearms. (Repealed by Firearms Act 1920 (10 & 11 Geo. 5. c. 43))
| Poor Law (Dissolution of School Districts and Adjustments) Act 1903 (repealed) | 3 Edw. 7. c. 19 | 11 August 1903 |
An Act to give power to dissolve School Districts formed under the Acts relating to the relief of the poor, and for facilitating adjustments on alterations of areas or authorities under those Acts. (Repealed by Poor Law Act 1927 (17 & 18 Geo. 5. c. 14))
| Patriotic Fund Reorganisation Act 1903 (repealed) | 3 Edw. 7. c. 20 | 11 August 1903 |
An Act to reorganise the Administration of the Patriotic Fund. (Repealed by Armed Forces (Pensions and Compensation) Act 2004 (c. 32))
| Sugar Convention Act 1903 (repealed) | 3 Edw. 7. c. 21 | 11 August 1903 |
An Act to make provision for giving effect to a Convention signed the Fifth day of March Nineteen hundred and two, in relation to Sugar. (Repealed by Statute Law Revision Act 1927 (17 & 18 Geo. 5. c. 42))
| Naval Works Act 1903 (repealed) | 3 Edw. 7. c. 22 | 11 August 1903 |
An Act to make further provision for the construction of works in the United Kingdom and elsewhere for the purposes of the Royal Navy. (Repealed by Statute Law Revision Act 1927 (17 & 18 Geo. 5. c. 42))
| Ireland Development Grant Act 1903 (repealed) | 3 Edw. 7. c. 23 | 11 August 1903 |
An Act to provide for a Special Grant to be used for the purposes of the Development of Ireland. (Repealed by Statute Law Revision Act 1927 (17 & 18 Geo. 5. c. 42))
| Education (London) Act 1903 (repealed) | 3 Edw. 7. c. 24 | 14 August 1903 |
An Act to extend and adapt the Education Act, 1902, (Note: Education Act 1902 (2 Edw. 7. c. 42)) to London. (Repealed by London Government Act 1963 (c. 33))
| Licensing (Scotland) Act 1903 (repealed) | 3 Edw. 7. c. 25 | 14 August 1903 |
An Act to consolidate with Amendments the Laws relating to Licensing in Scotland. (Repealed by Civic Government (Scotland) Act 1982 (c. 45))
| Marriages Legalization Act 1903 (repealed) | 3 Edw. 7. c. 26 | 14 August 1903 |
An Act to render valid Marriages heretofore solemnized at the Ellerker Chapel-of-Ease, Brantingham, and at the Churches of Saint Mark, Marske-in-Cleveland, All Saints, Brightwaltham (otherwise Brightwalton) and Saint Mary, Great Ilford, and at the Old Baptist Union Chapel, Grays Thurrock, and Marriages solemnized after banns published at the Mission Room in the parish of Marrick. (Repealed by Statute Law (Repeals) Act 1977 (c. 18))
| South African Loan and War Contribution Act 1903 (repealed) | 3 Edw. 7. c. 27 | 14 August 1903 |
An Act to authorise the Treasury to guarantee the payment of a Loan to be raised by the Transvaal, and to provide for the application of any sums paid by that Colony or the Orange River Colony towards the expenses incurred by His Majesty’s Government in or incidental to the prosecution of the late war in South Africa. (Repealed by Statute Law Revision Act 1927 (17 & 18 Geo. 5. c. 42) and Statute Law Revision Act 1953 (2 & 3 Eliz. 2. c. 5))
| Public Works Loans Act 1903 (repealed) | 3 Edw. 7. c. 28 | 14 August 1903 |
An Act to grant Money for the purpose of certain Local Loans out of the Local Loans Fund and for other purposes relating to Local Loans. (Repealed by Statute Law Revision Act 1927 (17 & 18 Geo. 5. c. 42))
| Military Works Act 1903 (repealed) | 3 Edw. 7. c. 29 | 14 August 1903 |
An Act to make further Provision for Defraying the Expenses of certain Military Works and other Military Services. (Repealed by Statute Law Revision Act 1927 (17 & 18 Geo. 5. c. 42))
| Railways (Electrical Power) Act 1903 | 3 Edw. 7. c. 30 | 14 August 1903 |
An Act to facilitate the Introduction and Use of Electrical Power on Railways. (Repealed for England and Wales and Scotland by Transport and Works Act 1992 (c. 42))
| Board of Agriculture and Fisheries Act 1903 | 3 Edw. 7. c. 31 | 14 August 1903 |
An Act to transfer to the Board of Agriculture powers and duties relating to the Industry of Fishing and to amend the Board of Agriculture Act, 1889. (Note: Board of Agriculture Act 1889 (52 & 53 Vict. c. 30))
| Appropriation Act 1903 (repealed) | 3 Edw. 7. c. 32 | 14 August 1903 |
An Act to apply certain sums out of the Consolidated Fund to the service of the years ending on the thirty-first day of March one thousand nine hundred and two and one thousand nine hundred and four, and to appropriate the Supplies granted in this Session of Parliament. (Repealed by Statute Law Revision Act 1927 (17 & 18 Geo. 5. c. 42))
| Burgh Police (Scotland) Act 1903 (repealed) | 3 Edw. 7. c. 33 | 14 August 1903 |
An Act to amend the Law relating to the Administration of Burghs in Scotland. (Repealed by Local Government (Scotland) Act 1973 (c. 65) and Local Government (Scotland) Act 1978 (c. 4))
| Town Councils (Scotland) Act 1903 (repealed) | 3 Edw. 7. c. 34 | 14 August 1903 |
An Act to amend the Town Councils (Scotland) Act, 1900. (Note: Town Councils (Scotland) Act 1900 (63 & 64 Vict. c. 49)) (Repealed by Representation of the People Act 1918 (7 & 8 Geo. 5. c. 64), Statute Law Revision Act 1927 (17 & 18 Geo. 5. c. 42), Local Government (Scotland) Act 1929 (19 & 20 Geo. 5. c. 25) and Local Government (Scotland) Act 1947 (10 & 11 Geo. 6. c. 43))
| Isle of Man (Customs) Act 1903 (repealed) | 3 Edw. 7. c. 35 | 14 August 1903 |
An Act to amend the Law with respect to Customs Duties in the Isle of Man. (Repealed by Statute Law Revision Act 1927 (17 & 18 Geo. 5. c. 42))
| Motor Car Act 1903 (repealed) | 3 Edw. 7. c. 36 | 14 August 1903 |
An Act to amend the Locomotives on Highways Act, 1896. (Note: Locomotives on Highways Act 1896 (59 & 60 Vict. c. 36)) (Repealed for England and Wales and Scotland by Road Traffic Act 1930 (20 & 21 Geo. 5. c. 43) and for Northern Ireland by Motor Vehicles (Traffic and Regulation) Act (Northern Ireland) 1926 (16 & 17 Geo. 5. c. 31 (N.I.)))
| Irish Land Act 1903 or the Land Purchase (Ireland) Act 1903 or the Wyndham Land Act | 3 Edw. 7. c. 37 | 14 August 1903 |
An Act to amend the Law relating to the occupation and ownership of Land in Ireland and for other purposes relating thereto, and to amend the Labourers (Ireland) Acts.
| Poor Prisoners' Defence Act 1903 (repealed) | 3 Edw. 7. c. 38 | 14 August 1903 |
An Act to make provision for the Defence of Poor Prisoners. (Repealed by Poor Prisoners' Defence Act 1930 (20 & 21 Geo. 5. c. 32))
| Housing of the Working Classes Act 1903 (repealed) | 3 Edw. 7. c. 39 | 14 August 1903 |
An Act to amend the Law relating to the Housing of the Working Classes. (Repealed for England and Wales by Housing Act 1925 (15 & 16 Geo. 5. c. 14), for Scotland by Housing (Scotland) Act 1925 (15 & 16 Geo. 5. c. 15) and for Northern Ireland by Planning and Housing Act (Northern Ireland) 1931 (21 & 22 Geo. 5. c. 12 (N.I.)) (Note: Incorrectly cited as "Planning and Housing (NI), 1913" in the Chronological Table of the Statutes.))
| Expiring Laws Continuance Act 1903 (repealed) | 3 Edw. 7. c. 40 | 14 August 1903 |
An Act to continue various Expiring Laws. (Repealed by Statute Law Revision Act 1927 (17 & 18 Geo. 5. c. 42))
| Public Buildings Expenses Act 1903 (repealed) | 3 Edw. 7. c. 41 | 14 August 1903 |
An Act to make further provision for defraying the expenses of the purchase of Land and Buildings and the construction of Buildings and Works in connexion with certain Public Departments. (Repealed by Statute Law Revision Act 1927 (17 & 18 Geo. 5. c. 42))
| County Courts Act 1903 (repealed) | 3 Edw. 7. c. 42 | 14 August 1903 |
An Act to extend the Jurisdiction of the County Courts. (Repealed by County Courts Act 1934 (24 & 25 Geo. 5. c. 53))
| Diseases of Animals Act 1903 (repealed) | 3 Edw. 7. c. 43 | 14 August 1903 |
An Act to amend the Diseases of Animals Act, 1894, (Note: Diseases of Animals Act 1894 (57 & 58 Vict. c. 57)) in relation to Sheep Scab. (Repealed for England and Wales and Scotland by Diseases of Animals Act 1950 (14 Geo. 6. c. 36) and for Northern Ireland by Diseases of Animals Act (Northern Ireland) 1958 (c. 13 (N.I.)))
| General Dealers (Ireland) Act 1903 | 3 Edw. 7. c. 44 | 14 August 1903 |
An Act for regulating the business of Marine Store Dealers and Dealers in Second-hand Goods in Ireland.
| Employment of Children Act 1903 (repealed) | 3 Edw. 7. c. 45 | 14 August 1903 |
All Act to make better provision for regulating the Employment of Children. (Repealed for England and Wales by Education Act 1921 (11 & 12 Geo. 5. c. 51), for Scotland by Children and Young Persons (Scotland) Act 1932 (22 & 23 Geo. 5. c. 47) and for Northern Ireland by Education Act (Northern Ireland) 1923 (13 & 14 Geo. 5. c. 21 (N.I.)))
| Revenue Act 1903 | 3 Edw. 7. c. 46 | 14 August 1903 |
An Act to make certain amendments of the Law relating to Customs and Inland Revenue, and of the Law relating to the powers and duties of the National Debt Commissioners.
| Military Lands Act 1903 | 3 Edw. 7. c. 47 | 14 August 1903 |
An Act to amend the Military Lands Acts, 1892 to 1900, with respect to the acquisition of land for military purposes.

=== Local acts ===
| Short title | Citation | Royal assent |
Long title
| Western Trust Limited Act 1903 | 3 Edw. 7. c. i | 30 June 1903 |
An Act for enabling the Western Trust Limited to re-arrange its capital and to provide for the extinction of its B shares and for issuing ordinary shares in lieu thereof and for altering the memorandum and articles of association of the Company and for other purposes.
| Great Western Railway (Pension Fund) Act 1903 | 3 Edw. 7. c. ii | 30 June 1903 |
An Act to make further provision with respect to the Servants' Pension Fund of the Great Western Railway Company and for other purposes.
| Iveagh Trust Act 1903 or the Dublin Improvement (Bull Alley Area) Act 1903 | 3 Edw. 7. c. iii | 30 June 1903 |
An Act to amalgamate the Guinness Trust (Dublin) Fund with the Dublin Improvement (Bull Alley Area) Scheme to vest the property of the Guinness (Dublic) Trustees in the Trustees of the said scheme to change the name of such last-mentioned Trustees to confer further powers on them and for other purposes.
| Queensland Investment and Land Mortgage Company's Act 1903 | 3 Edw. 7. c. iv | 30 June 1903 |
An Act for enabling the Queensland Investment and Land Mortgage Company Limited to pay off capital paid in advance of calls and for other purposes.
| Great Northern and City Railway Act 1903 | 3 Edw. 7. c. v | 30 June 1903 |
An Act to amend the Great Northern and City Railway Act 1902 (Note: Great Northern and City Railway Act 1902 (2 Edw. 7. c. ccxxii)) and to authorise the Great Northern and City Railway Company to raise additional capital for the purposes of their undertaking.
| Maidstone Gas Act 1903 | 3 Edw. 7. c. vi | 30 June 1903 |
An Act to authorise the Maidstone Gas Company to convert their existing capital to raise additional capital and for other purposes.
| Stoke Newington Borough Council Act 1903 (repealed) | 3 Edw. 7. c. vii | 30 June 1903 |
An Act to authorise agreements between the Councils of the metropolitan boroughs of Stoke Newington Hackney and Islington with respect to the supply of electricity in bulk and to confer powers upon the Stoke Newington Borough Council with respect to the purchase of lands and for other purposes. (Repealed by Local Law (Greater London Council and Inner London Boroughs) Order 1965 (SI 1965/540))
| North Middlesex Gas Act 1903 | 3 Edw. 7. c. viii | 30 June 1903 |
An Act to extend the powers of the North Middlesex Gas Company.
| Plymouth and Stonehouse Gas Act 1903 | 3 Edw. 7. c. ix | 30 June 1903 |
An Act to confer further powers on the Plymouth and Stonehouse Gas Light and Coke Company and for other purposes.
| Faversham Gas Act 1903 | 3 Edw. 7. c. x | 30 June 1903 |
An Act to confer further powers upon the Faversham Gas Company and for other purposes.
| North's Navigation Collieries (1889) Limited Act 1903 | 3 Edw. 7. c. xi | 30 June 1903 |
An Act to provide for an increase and re-arrangement of the share capital of North's Navigation Collieries (1889) Limited and for other purpose
| Life Association of Scotland Act 1903 (repealed) | 3 Edw. 7. c. xii | 30 June 1903 |
An Act for enlarging the powers of investment of the Life Association of Scotland and for other purposes. (Repealed by Life Association of Scotland Limited Act 1964 (c. vii))
| Pelican and British Empire Life Office Act 1903 | 3 Edw. 7. c. xiii | 30 June 1903 |
An Act to effect a combination of the undertakings of the Pelican Life Insurance Company and the British Empire Mutual Life Assurance Company and for other purposes.
| Lima Railways Company Act 1903 | 3 Edw. 7. c. xiv | 30 June 1903 |
An Act to extend the objects and powers of the Lima Railways Company Limited and for other purposes.
| Exeter Railway Act 1903 | 3 Edw. 7. c. xv | 30 June 1903 |
An Act to authorise the Exeter Railway Company to acquire additional lands to revive and further extend the time for the completion of their authorised railways to raise additional capital and for other purposes.
| Poplar All Saints (Rate Abolition) Act 1903 | 3 Edw. 7. c. xvi | 30 June 1903 |
An Act to abolish the rate now leviable for certain church purposes in the parish of All Saints Poplar in the county of London and to make other provisions for securing the stipend of the rector of All Saints Poplar and for other purposes.
| London Hydraulic Power Company Act 1903 | 3 Edw. 7. c. xvii | 30 June 1903 |
An Act to enlarge the powers of the London Hydraulic Power Company as to the raising of capital the supply of water and the acquisition of a new site for their pumping station at Westminster and for other purposes.
| Sutton District Waterworks Act 1903 | 3 Edw. 7. c. xviii | 30 June 1903 |
An Act to authorise the Sutton District Water Company to construct additional waterworks acquire lands and raise further moneys and for other purposes.
| Bridgwater Gas Act 1903 | 3 Edw. 7. c. xix | 30 June 1903 |
An Act for continuing the Bridgwater Gas Light Company for regulating and increasing the capital of the Company and for other purposes.
| East Ardsley Gas Act 1903 | 3 Edw. 7. c. xx | 30 June 1903 |
An Act for incorporating and conferring powers upon the East Ardsley Gas Company and for other purposes.
| Burgess Hill and St. John's Common Gas Act 1903 | 3 Edw. 7. c. xxi | 30 June 1903 |
An Act for incorporating and conferring powers on the Burgess Hill and St. John's Common Gas Company and for other purposes.
| Scarborough Gas Act 1903 (repealed) | 3 Edw. 7. c. xxii | 30 June 1903 |
An Act to authorise the Scarborough Gas Company to raise additional capital and for other purposes. (Repealed by Scarborough Gas (Consolidation) Act 1927 (17 & 18 Geo. 5. c. xcv))
| Sittingbourne District Gas Act 1903 | 3 Edw. 7. c. xxiii | 30 June 1903 |
An Act to confer further powers on the Sittingbourne District Gas Company.
| South Wales Mineral Railway Act 1903 | 3 Edw. 7. c. xxiv | 30 June 1903 |
An Act to regulate the capital of the South Wales Mineral Railway Company and for other purposes.
| Cleveland and Durham County Electric Power Act 1903 | 3 Edw. 7. c. xxv | 30 June 1903 |
An Act to confer further powers upon the Cleveland and Durham County Electric Power Company and for other purposes.
| India Rubber, Gutta Percha and Telegraph Works Company Act 1903 | 3 Edw. 7. c. xxvi | 30 June 1903 |
An Act for further extending the powers of the India Rubber Gutta Percha and Telegraph Works Company Limited.
| Milford Docks Act 1903 (repealed) | 3 Edw. 7. c. xxvii | 30 June 1903 |
An Act to amend the Acts relating to the Milford Docks Company and for other purposes. (Repealed by Milford Docks Act 1930 (20 & 21 Geo. 5. c. lxxi))
| Market Drayton Gas Act 1903 | 3 Edw. 7. c. xxviii | 30 June 1903 |
An Act for incorporating and conferring powers on the Market Drayton Gas Company.
| Wellington (Salop) Gas Act 1903 | 3 Edw. 7. c. xxix | 30 June 1903 |
An Act for incorporating and conferring powers on the Wellington (Salop) Gas Company and for other purposes.
| Knott End Railway (Extension of Time) Act 1903 | 3 Edw. 7. c. xxx | 30 June 1903 |
An Act for reviving and extending the period limited by the Knott End Railway Act 1898 (Note: Knott End Railway Act 1898 (61 & 62 Vict. c. ccxliv)) for the compulsory purchase of lands and for extending the period limited by that Act for the construction of the railway by that Act authorised and for other purposes.
| Winchester Water and Gas Act 1903 | 3 Edw. 7. c. xxxi | 30 June 1903 |
An Act for conferring further powers upon the Winchester Water and Gas Company and for other purposes.
| Midland Railway Act 1903 | 3 Edw. 7. c. xxxii | 30 June 1903 |
An Act to confer additional powers upon the Midland Railway Company and upon the Norfolk and Suffolk Joint Railways Committee and upon the Midland and Great Northern Railways Joint Committee for the construction of works and the acquisition of lands and for other purposes.
| Staffordshire and Worcestershire Canal Act 1903 | 3 Edw. 7. c. xxxiii | 30 June 1903 |
An Act for conferring further powers upon the Company of Proprietors of the Staffordshire and Worcestershire Canal Navigation and for other purposes.
| Harrow and Stanmore Gas Act 1903 | 3 Edw. 7. c. xxxiv | 30 June 1903 |
An Act to authorise the Harrow and Stanmore Gas Company to acquire lands to construct gasworks to raise additional capital and for other purposes.
| Wirral Railway Act 1903 | 3 Edw. 7. c. xxxv | 30 June 1903 |
An Act to revive and extend the powers for the purchase of land and the time limited for the completion of the railway authorised by the Wirral Railway Act 1898 (Note: Wirral Railway Act 1898 (61 & 62 Vict. c. lxvii)) to extend the time for disposing of and otherwise dealing with certain surplus lands of the Wirral Railway Company to increase the capital of that Company and for other purposes.
| Rickmansworth Gas Act 1903 | 3 Edw. 7. c. xxxvi | 30 June 1903 |
An Act to empower the Urban District Council of Rickmansworth to purchase the undertaking of the Rickmansworth Gas Company and to supply gas and for other purposes.
| Harrogate Water Act 1903 (repealed) | 3 Edw. 7. c. xxxvii | 30 June 1903 |
An Act to authorise the transfer of the Knaresborough Waterworks to the Corporation of Harrogate and to enable them to supply water in Knaresborough and adjoining places. (Repealed by Harrogate Stray Act 1985 (c. xxii))
| Gorleston and Southtown Gas Act 1903 | 3 Edw. 7. c. xxxviii | 30 June 1903 |
An Act for conferring further powers on the Gorleston and Southtown Gas Company.
| Belfast Water Act 1903 | 3 Edw. 7. c. xxxix | 30 June 1903 |
An Act to confer further powers on the Belfast City and District Water Commissioners.
| Sheepshed Urban District Council Gas Act 1903 | 3 Edw. 7. c. xl | 30 June 1903 |
An Act to provide for the transfer of the undertaking of the Sheepshed Gas and Coke Company Limited to the Sheepshed Urban District Council and to confer further powers on the said Council with inspect to the supply of gas and for other purposes.
| Gas Light and Coke Company's Act 1903 | 3 Edw. 7. c. xli | 30 June 1903 |
An Act to enable the Gas Light and Coke Company to raise additional moneys and to purchase take and hold lands and for altering the standard price of gas and redeeming capital and for other purposes.
| Commercial Gas Act 1903 (repealed) | 3 Edw. 7. c. xlii | 30 June 1903 |
An Act to make provision for the testing of gas supplied by the Commercial Gas Company and for other purposes. (Repealed by London Gas Act 1905 (5 Edw. 7. c. clv))
| Great Eastern Railway Act 1903 | 3 Edw. 7. c. xliii | 30 June 1903 |
An Act for conferring further powers on the Great Eastern Railway Company and for other purposes.
| Land Drainage Provisional Order Confirmation Act 1903 | 3 Edw. 7. c. xliv | 30 June 1903 |
An Act to confirm a Provisional Order under the Land Drainage Act 1861 (Note: Land Drainage Act 1861 (24 & 25 Vict. c. 133)) relating to lands in the parishes of Aslackby and Dowsby in the county of Lincoln.
| | Drainage Order (Lincoln) 1903 In the matter of the proposed Separate Drainage District in the parishes of Aslackby and Dowsby in the county of Lincoln. | |
| Electric Lighting Order Confirmation (No.1) Act 1903 | 3 Edw. 7. c. xlv | 30 June 1903 |
An Act to confirm a Provisional Order made by the Board of Trade under the Electric Lighting Acts 1882 (Note: Electric Lighting Act 1882 (45 & 46 Vict. c. 56)) and 1888 (Note: Electric Lighting Act 1888 (51 & 52 Vict. c. 12)) relating to Mitchelstown in the county of Cork.
| | Mitchelstown Electric Lighting Order 1903 Provisional Order granted by the Board of Trade under the Electric Lighting Acts 1882 and 1888 to the Mitchelstown Rural District Council No. 1 in respect of the town of Mitchelstown in the County of Cork. | |
| Electric Lighting Orders Confirmation (No. 2) Act 1903 | 3 Edw. 7. c. xlvi | 30 June 1903 |
An Act to confirm certain Provisional Orders made by the Board of Trade under the Electric Lighting Acts 1882 and 1888 relating to Brixham Brumby and Frodingham Dawlish Horbury Hucknall-under-Huthwaite Newton-in-Makerfield Orrell Scunthorpe Sidmouth and Yeovil.
| | Brixham Electric Lighting Order 1903 Provisional Order granted by the Board of Trade under the Electric Lighting Acts 1882 and 1888 to the Brixham Urban District Council in respect of the Urban District of Brixham in the County of Devon. | |
| | Brumby and Frodingham Electric Lighting Order 1903 Provisional Order granted by the Board of Trade under the Electric Lighting Acts 1882 and 1888 to the Urban District Council of Brumby and Frodingham in respect of the Urban District of Brumby and Frodingham in the County of Lincoln. | |
| | Dawlish Electric Lighting Order 1903 Provisional Order granted by the Board of Trade under the Electric Lighting Acts 1882 and 1888 to the Urban District Council of Dawlish in respect of the Urban District of Dawlish in the County of Devon. | |
| | Horbury Electric Lighting Order 1903 Provisional Order granted by the Board of Trade under the Electric Lighting Acts 1882 and 1888 to the Urban District Council of Horbury in respect of the Urban District of Horbury in the West Riding of the County of York. | |
| | Hucknall-under-Huthwaite Electric Lighting Order 1903 Provisional Order granted by the Board of Trade under the Electric Lighting Acts 1882 and 1888 to the Hucknall-under-Huthwaite Urban District Council in respect of the Urban District of Hucknall-under-Huthwaite in the County of Nottingham. | |
| | Newton-in-Makerfield Electric Lighting Order 1903 Provisional Order granted by the Board of Trade under the Electric Lighting Acts 1882 and 1888 to the Urban District Council of Newton-in-Makerfield in respect of the Urban District of Newton-in-Makerfield in the County of Lancaster. | |
| | Orrell Electric Lighting Order 1903 Provisional Order granted by the Board of Trade under the Electric Lighting Acts 1882 and 1888 to the Urban District Council of Orrell in respect of the Urban District of Orrell in the County of Lancaster. | |
| | Scunthorpe Electric Lighting Order 1903 Provisional Order granted by the Board of Trade under the Electric Lighting Acts 1882 and 1888 to the Urban District Council of Scunthorpe in respect of the Urban District of Scunthorpe in the Parts of Lindsey in the County of Lincoln. | |
| | Sidmouth Electric Lighting Order 1903 Provisional Order granted by the Board of Trade under the Electric Lighting Acts 1882 and 1888 to the Urban District Council of Sidmouth in respect of the Urban District of Sidmouth in the County of Devon. | |
| | Yeovil Electric Lighting Order 1903 Provisional Order granted by the Board of Trade under the Electric Lighting Acts 1882 and 1888 to the Mayor Aldermen and Burgesses of the Borough of Yeovil in respect of the Borough of Yeovil in the County of Somerset. | |
| Electric Lighting Orders Confirmation (No. 3) Act 1903 | 3 Edw. 7. c. xlvii | 30 June 1903 |
An Act to confirm certain Provisional Orders made by the Board of Trade under the Electric Lighting Acts 1882 and 1888 relating to Auckland (Rural) Carisbrooke and Northwood Drayton in Hales Illogan Ingleton Port Dinorwic Sevenoaks South Shields (Rural) Stafford (Rural) and Wilmslow.
| | Auckland (Rural) Electric Lighting Order 1903 Provisional Order granted by the Board of Trade under the Electric Lighting Acts 1882 and 1888 to the County of Durham Electrical Power Distribution Company Limited in respect of the Rural District of Auckland in the County of Durham. | |
| | Carisbrooke and Northwood Electric Lighting Order 1903 Provisional Order granted by the Board of Trade under the Electric Lighting Acts 1882 and 1888 to the Isle of Wight Electric Light and Power Company Limited in respect of the Parishes of Carisbrooke and Northwood in the Rural District of Isle of Wight in the Isle of Wight. | |
| | Drayton-in-Hales Electric Lighting Order 1903 Provisional Order granted by the Board of Trade under the Electric Lighting Acts 1882 and 1888 to the Market Drayton Electric Light and Power Company Limited in respect of a portion of the Parish of Drayton in Hales in the Rural District of Drayton in the County of Salop. | |
| | Illogan Electric Lighting Order 1903 Provisional Order granted by the Board of Trade under the Electric Lighting Acts 1882 and 1888 to the Urban Electric Supply Company Limited in respect of the Parish of Illogan in the Rural District of Redruth in the County of Cornwall. | |
| | Ingleton Electric Lighting Order 1903 Provisional Order granted by the Board of Trade under the Electric Lighting Acts 1882 and 1888 to the Ingleton Electric Lighting and Power Company Limited in respect of the Parishes of Ingleton and Thornton-in-Lonsdale in the Rural District of Settle in the West Riding of the County of York. | |
| | Port Dinorwic Electric Lighting Order 1903 Provisional Order granted by the Board of Trade under the Electric Lighting Acts 1882 and 1888 to George William Duff Assheton Smith of Vaynol Park in the County of Carnarvon Esquire and his successors in title in respect of portions of the rural districts of Gwyrfai and Ogwen in the County of Carnarvon. | |
| | Sevenoaks Electric Lighting Order 1903 Provisional Order granted by the Board of Trade under the Electric Lighting Acts 1882 and 1888 to the Kent Electric Power Syndicate Limited in respect of the Urban District of Sevenoaks in the County of Kent. | |
| | South Shields (Rural) Electric Lighting Order 1903 Provisional Order granted by the Board of Trade under the Electric Lighting Acts 1882 and 1888 to the County of Durham Electrical Power Distribution Company Limited in respect of the Rural District of South Shields in the County of Durham. | |
| | Stafford (Rural) Electric Lighting Order 1903 Provisional Order granted by the Board of Trade under the Electric Lighting Acts 1882 and 1888 to the Mayor Aldermen and Burgesses of the Borough of Stafford in respect of parts of the parishes of Seighford Tillington Hopton and Coton Baswich and Castle Church all within the Rural District of Stafford in the County of Stafford. | |
| | Wilmslow Electric Lighting Order 1903 Provisional Order granted by the Board of Trade under the Electric Lighting Acts 1882 and 1888 to the Alderley and Wilmslow Electric Supply Limited in respect of the Urban District of Wilmslow in the County of Chester. | |
| Electric Lighting Orders Confirmation (No. 4) Act 1903 | 3 Edw. 7. c. xlviii | 30 June 1903 |
An Act to confirm certain Provisional Orders made by the Board of Trade under the Electric Lighting Acts 1882 and 1888 the Electric Lighting (Scotland) Act 1890 (Note: Electric Lighting (Scotland) Act 1890 (53 & 54 Vict. c. 13)) and the Electric Lighting (Scotland) Act 1902 (Note: Electric Lighting (Scotland) Act 1902 (2 Edw. 7. c. 35)) relating to Borrowstounness Cambuslang Irvine Kilmalcolm and Kirkintilloch.
| | Borrowstouness Electric Lighting Order 1903 Provisional Order granted by the Board of Trade under the Electric Lighting Acts 1882 and 1888 the Electric Lighting (Scotland) Act 1890 and the Electric Lighting (Scotland) Act 1902 to the Provost Magistrates and Councillors of the Burgh of Borrowstounness in respect of the Burgh of Borrowstounness in the County of Linlithgow. | |
| | Cambuslang Electric Lighting Order 1903 Provisional Order granted by the Board of Trade under the Electric Lighting Acts 1882 and 1888 the Electric Lighting (Scotland) Act 1890 and the Electric Lighting (Scotland) Act 1902 to the County Council of the County of Lanark in respect of the Special Lighting District of Cambuslang in the Parish of Cambuslang in the said county. | |
| | Irvine Electric Lighting Order 1903 Provisional Order granted by the Board of Trade under the Electric Lighting Acts 1882 and 1888 the Electric Lighting (Scotland) Act 1890 and the Electric Lighting (Scotland) Act 1902 to the Provost Magistrates and Councillors of the Royal Burgh of Irvine in respect of the Burgh of Irvine in the County of Ayr. | |
| | Kilmalcolm Electric Lighting Order 1903 Provisional Order granted by the Board of Trade under the Electric Lighting Acts 1882 and 1888 the Electric Lighting (Scotland) Act 1890 and the Electric Lighting (Scotland) Act 1902 to the Kilmalcolm Electric Lighting Company Limited in respect of part of the Parish of Kilmalcolm in the County of Renfrew. | |
| | Kirkintilloch Electric Lighting Order 1903 Provisional Order granted by the Board of Trade under the Electric Lighting Acts 1882 and 1888 the Electric Lighting (Scotland) Act 1890 and the Electric Lighting (Scotland) Act 1902 to the Provost Magistrates and Councillors of the Burgh of Kirkintilloch in respect of the Burgh of Kirkintilloch in the County of Dumbarton. | |
| Electric Lighting Orders Confirmation (No. 6) Act 1903 | 3 Edw. 7. c. xlix | 30 June 1903 |
An Act to confirm certain Provisional Orders made by the Board of Trade under the Electric Lighting Acts 1882 and 1888 relating to Bexley (Extension) Bridgwater and District Bromley (Rural) Hendon (Amendment) Huddersfield (Extension) Leatherhead and District (Extension) Prestwich (Amendment) Stroud and Whitchurch and Pangbourne.
| | Bexley (Extension) Electric Lighting Order 1903 Provisional Order granted by the Board of Trade under the Electric Lighting Acts 1882 and 1888 to the Urban District Council of Bexley in respect of an extension of their existing area of supply to the East Wickham Ward of the said district in the County of Kent. | |
| | Bridgwater and District Electric Lighting Order 1903 Provisional Order granted by the Board of Trade under the Electric Lighting Acts 1882 and 1888 to the Bridgwater and District Electric Supply and Traction Company Limited in respect of the Borough of Bridgwater and parts of the Parishes of Bridgwater Without Durleigh and Wembdon in the Rural District of Bridgwater in the County of Somerset. | |
| | Bromley (Rural) Electric Lighting Order 1903 Provisional Order granted by the Board of Trade under the Electric Lighting Acts 1882 and 1888 to the Kent Electric Power Syndicate Limited in respect of the Rural District of Bromley in the County of Kent. | |
| | Hendon (Amendment) Electric Lighting Order 1903 Provisional Order granted by the Board of Trade under the Electric Lighting Acts 1882 and 1888 amending the Hendon Electric Lighting Order 1899. | |
| | Huddersfield (Extension) Electric Lighting Order 1903 Provisional Order granted by the Board of Trade under the Electric Lighting Acts 1882 and 1888 to the Mayor Aldermen and Burgesses of the County Borough of Huddersfield in respect of the Urban District of Linthwaite in the West Riding of the County of York. | |
| | Leatherhead and District (Extension) Electric Lighting Order 1903 Provisional Order granted by the Board of Trade under the Electric Lighting Acts 1882 and 1888 to the Leatherhead and District Electricity Company Limited in respect of the extension of their area of supply to the Parish of Fetcham in the Rural District of Epsom in the County of Surrey. | |
| | Prestwich (Amendment) Electric Lighting Order 1903 Provisional Order granted by the Board of Trade under the Electric Lighting Acts 1882 and 1888 amending the Prestwich Electric Lighting Order 1900. | |
| | Stroud Electric Lighting Order 1903 Provisional Order granted by the Board of Trade under the Electric Lighting Acts 1882 and 1888 to the Urban District Council of Stroud in respect of the Urban District of Stroud in the County of Gloucester. | |
| | Whitchurch and Pangbourne Electric Lighting Order 1903 Provisional Order granted by the Board of Trade under the Electric Lighting Acts 1882 and 1888 to the Whitchurch and Pangbourne Electric Supply Company Limited in respect of the Parish of Whitchurch in the Rural District of Goring in the County of Oxford and the Parish of Pangbourne in the Rural District of Bradfield in the County of Berkshire. | |
| Lanarkshire and Ayrshire Railway Order Confirmation Act 1903 | 3 Edw. 7. c. l | 30 June 1903 |
An Act to confirm a Provisional Order under the Private Legislation Procedure (Scotland) Act 1899 (Note: Private Legislation Procedure (Scotland) Act 1899 (62 & 63 Vict. c. 47)) relating to the Lanarkshire and Ayrshire Railway.
| | Lanarkshire and Ayrshire Railway Order 1903 Provisional Order to empower the Lanarkshire and Ayrshire Railway Company to raise additional capital to enable the Caledonian Railway Company to subscribe for additional shares or stock and for other purposes. | |
| Dundee Royal Lunatic Asylum Order Confirmation Act 1903 | 3 Edw. 7. c. li | 30 June 1903 |
An Act to confirm a Provisional Order under the Private Legislation Procedure (Scotland) Act 1899 relating to the Dundee Royal Lunatic Asylum
| | Dundee Royal Lunatic Asylum (Sale) Order 1903 Provisional Order to confirm an Agreement between the Dundee Royal Lunatic Asylum and the District Lunacy Board for the Dundee Lunacy District for the Sale to that Board of the Asylum known as Westgreen Lunatic Asylum and for other purposes. | |
| Local Government Board (Ireland) Provisional Orders Confirmation (No. 1) Act 1903 | 3 Edw. 7. c. lii | 30 June 1903 |
An Act to confirm certain Provisional Orders of the Local Government Board for Ireland relating to the urban districts, of Bray and Dungarvan and the counties of Dublin Waterford and Wicklow.
| | Bray (Financial Relations) Order 1903 Provisional Order to alter the financial relations between the Urban District of Bray and the Counties of Wicklow and Dublin. | |
| | Dungarvan (Financial Relations) Order 1903 Provisional Order to alter the financial relations between the Urban District of Dungarvan and the County of Waterford. | |
| Local Government Board (Ireland) Provisional Order Confirmation (No. 2) Act 1903 | 3 Edw. 7. c. liii | 30 June 1903 |
An Act to confirm a Provisional Order of the Local Government Board for Ireland relating to the county of Waterford.
| | County Waterford Order 1903 Provisional Order to enable the County Council of Waterford to put in force the Compulsory Clauses of the Lands Clauses Acts. | |
| Local Government Board (Ireland) Provisional Orders Confirmation (No. 4) Act 1903 | 3 Edw. 7. c. liv | 30 June 1903 |
An Act to confirm certain Provisional Orders of the Local Government Board for Ireland relating to Belfast (Rural) Ennistymon (Rural) and Londonderry and the Rathdrum and Wicklow Joint Burial Board District.
| | Carnmoney Burial Ground Order 1903 Provisional Order to enable the Council of the Rural District of Belfast to put in force the Compulsory Clauses of the Lands Clauses Acts. | |
| | Ennistymon Order 1903 Provisional Order to enable the Council of the Rural District of Ennistymon to put in force the Compulsory Clauses of the Lands Clauses Acts. | |
| | Londonderry Order 1903 Provisional Order to enable the Corporation of Londonderry to put in force the Compulsory Clauses of the Lands Clauses Acts. | |
| | Rathdrum and Wicklow Joint Burial Board Provisional Order 1903 Provisional Order. | |
| Local Government Board (Ireland) Provisional Orders Confirmation (No. 6) Act 1903 | 3 Edw. 7. c. lv | 30 June 1903 |
An Act to confirm certain Provisional Orders of the Local Government Board for Ireland relating to the urban district of Athy and the rural district of Naas (No. 1).
| | Athy Order 1903 Provisional Order to enable the Council of the Urban District of Athy to put in force the Compulsory Clauses of the Lands Clauses Acts. | |
| | Newbridge Waterworks Order 1903 Provisional Order to enable the Council of the Rural District of Naas (No. 1) to put in force the Compulsory Clauses of the Lands Clauses Acts. | |
| Local Government Board (Ireland) Provisional Orders Confirmation (No. 8) Act 1903 | 3 Edw. 7. c. lvi | 30 June 1903 |
An Act to confirm certain Provisional Orders of the Local Government Board for Ireland relating to the urban districts of Armagh Clonakilty Fermoy Kinsale Lurgan Macroom Midleton Portadown Queenstown Skibbereen and Youghal the counties of Armagh and Cork and the Kildare Drainage District.
| | County of Armagh (Financial Relations) Order 1903 Provisional Order to alter the financial relations between the Urban County Districts of Armagh Portadown and Lurgan and the County of Armagh. | |
| | County of Cork (Financial Relations) Order 1903 Provisional Order to alter the Financial Relations between the Urban County Districts of Clonakilty Fermoy Kinsale Macroom Midleton Queenstown Skibbereen and Youghal in the County of Cork and the County of Cork. | |
| | Kildare Drainage Order 1903 Provisional Order to transfer the business of the Kildare District Drainage Board to the County Council of Kildare. | |
| Local Government Board's Provisional Order Confirmation (Housing of Working Classes) Act 1903 | 3 Edw. 7. c. lvii | 30 June 1903 |
An Act to confirm a Provisional Order of the Local Government Board relating to Bolton.
| | Bolton Order 1903 Provisional Order for confirming an Improvement Scheme under Part I. of the Housing of the Working Classes Act 1890. (Note: Housing of the Working Classes Act 1890 (53 & 54 Vict. c. 70)) | |
| Local Government Board's Provisional Orders Confirmation (No. 1) Act 1903 | 3 Edw. 7. c. lviii | 30 June 1903 |
An Act to confirm certain Provisional Orders of the Local Government Board relating to Aberavon Darlington Hexham Reading Stafford and Wallasey.
| | Aberavon Order 1903 Provisional Order for altering a Local Act (Note: Aberavon Local Board Act 1866 (29 & 30 Vict. c. ccxl)) and a Confirming Act. (Note: Local Government Board's Provisional Orders Confirmation (No. 14) Act 1896 (59 & 60 Vict. c. cviii)) | |
| | Darlington Order 1903 Provisional Order for altering a Confirming Act. (Note: Local Government Board's Provisional Orders Confirmation (No. 18) Act 1896 (59 & 60 Vict. c. cx)) | |
| | Hexham Order 1903 Provisional Order for the alteration of a Confirming Act. | |
| | Reading Water Order 1903 Provisional Order for altering a Confirming Act. (Note: Local Government Board's Provisional Orders Confirmation (No. 14) Act 1899 (62 & 63 Vict. c. cclxxii)) | |
| | Stafford Order 1903 Provisional Order for altering a Confirming Act. (Note: Local Government Board's Provisional Orders Confirmation (No. 16) Act 1889 (52 & 53 Vict. c. cxvii)) | |
| | Wallasey Order 1903 Provisional Order for altering certain Local Acts. | |
| Local Government Board's Provisional Orders Confirmation (No. 2) Act 1903 | 3 Edw. 7. c. lix | 30 June 1903 |
An Act to confirm certain Provisional Orders of the Local Government Board relating to Barnes Burton upon Trent Castle Ward (Rural) Matlock Bath and Scarthin Nick. Newton Abbot Penrith Stroud Worthing and Yardley (Rural).
| | Barnes Order 1903 Provisional Order to enable the Urban District Council of Barnes to put in force the Compulsory Clauses of the Lands Clauses Acts. | |
| | Burton-upon-Trent Order 1903 Provisional Order to enable the Urban Sanitary Authority for the Borough of Burton upon Trent to put in force the Compulsory Clauses of the Lands Clauses Acts. | |
| | Castle Ward Rural Order 1903 Provisional Order to enable the Rural District Council of Castle Ward to put in force the Compulsory Clauses of the Lands Clauses Acts. | |
| | Matlock Bath and Scarthin Nick Order 1903 Provisional Order to enable the Urban District Council of Matlock Bath and Scarthin Nick to put in force the Compulsory Clauses of the Lands Clauses Acts. | |
| | Newton Abbot Order 1903 Provisional Order to enable the Urban District Council of Newton Abbot to put in force the Compulsory Clauses of the Lands Clauses Acts. | |
| | Penrith Order 1903 Provisional Order to enable the Urban District Council of Penrith to put in force the Compulsory Clauses of the Lands Clauses Acts. | |
| | Stroud Order 1903 Provisional Order to enable the Urban District Council of Stroud to put in force the Compulsory Clauses of the Lands Clauses Acts. | |
| | Worthing Order 1903 Provisional Order to enable the Urban District Council for the Borough of Worthing to put in force the Compulsory Clauses of the Lands Clauses Acts. | |
| | Yardley Rural Order 1903 Provisional Order to enable the Rural District Council of Yardley to put in force the Compulsory Clauses of the Lands Clauses Acts. | |
| Local Government Board's Provisional Orders Confirmation (No. 3) Act 1903 (repealed) | 3 Edw. 7. c. lx | 30 June 1903 |
An Act to confirm certain Provisional Orders of the Local Government Board relating to the counties of Oxford and Worcester. (Repealed by Statute Law (Repeals) Act 1998 (c. 43))
| | County of Oxford Order 1903 Provisional Order made in pursuance of sub-section (2) of Section 69 of the Local Government Act 1888. (Note: Local Government Act 1888 (51 & 52 Vict. c. 41)) | |
| | County of Worcestershire Order 1903 Provisional Order made in pursuance of sub-section (2) of Section 69 of the Local Government Act 1888. | |
| Local Government Board's Provisional Orders Confirmation (No. 4) Act 1903 | 3 Edw. 7. c. lxi | 30 June 1903 |
An Act to confirm certain Provisional Orders of the Local Government Board relating to Camborne Heston and Isleworth Mountain Ash New Windsor Southport Stratford-upon-Avon Tunbridge Wells and Whitley and Monkseaton.
| | Camborne Order 1903 Provisional Order to enable the Urban District Council of Camborne to put in force the Compulsory Clauses of the Lands Clauses Acts. | |
| | Heston and Isleworth Order 1903 Provisional Order to enable the Urban District Council of Heston and Isleworth to put in force the Compulsory Clauses of the Lands Clauses Acts. | |
| | Mountain Ash Order 1903 Provisional Order for altering the Mountain Ash Local Board Act 1886. (Note: Mountain Ash Local Board Act 1886 (49 & 50 Vict. c. cxiv)) | |
| | New Windsor Order 1903 Provisional Order to enable the Urban District Council for the Borough of New Windsor to put in force the Compulsory Clauses of the Lands Clauses Acts. | |
| | Southport Order 1903 Provisional Order for altering a Confirming Act. (Note: Local Government Board's Provisional Orders Confirmation (No. 6) Act 1895 (58 & 59 Vict. c. lxxxvii)) | |
| | Stratford-upon-Avon Order 1903 Provisional Order to enable the Urban District Council for the Borough of Stratford - upon - Avon to put in force the Compulsory Clauses of the Lands Clauses Acts. | |
| | Tunbridge Wells Order 1903 Provisional Order for altering a Confirming Act. (Note: Local Government Board's Provisional Orders Confirmation (No. 14) Act 1897 (60 & 61 Vict. c. cxli)) | |
| | Whitley and Monkseaton Order 1903 Provisional Order to enabie the Urban District Council of Whitley and Monkseaton to put in force the Compulsory Clauses of the Lands Clauses Acts. | |
| Local Government Board's Provisional Orders Confirmation (No. 6) Act 1903 | 3 Edw. 7. c. lxii | 30 June 1903 |
An Act to confirm certain Provisional Orders of the Local Government Board relating to Coventry Rawmarsh Shipley and Tynemouth.
| | Coventry Water Order 1903 Provisional Order for altering the Coventry Water Act 1889. (Note: Coventry Water Act 1889 (52 & 53 Vict. c. xli)) | |
| | Rawmarsh Order 1903 Provisional Order for partially repealing and altering the Rotherham and Kimberworth Local Board of Health Act 1870. (Note: Rotherham and Kimberworth Local Board of Health Act 1870 (33 & 34 Vict. c. cxxxiv)) | |
| | Shipley Order 1903 Provisional Order for the alteration of a Confirming Act. (Note: Local Government Board's Provisional Orders Confirmation (No. 13) Act 1900 (63 & 64 Vict. c. clxxxii)) | |
| | Tynemouth Order 1903 Provisional Order for partially repealing and altering certain Local Acts. | |
| Local Government Board's Provisional Orders Confirmation (No. 7) Act 1903 | 3 Edw. 7. c. lxiii | 30 June 1903 |
An Act to confirm certain Provisional Orders of the Local Government Board relating to the counties of East Sussex and Leicester.
| | County of East Sussex Order 1903 Provisional Order to enable the County Council of East Sussex to put in force the Compulsory Clauses of the Lands Clauses Acts. | |
| | County of Leicester Order 1903 Provisional Order made in pursuance of sub-section (2) of Section 69 of the Local Government Act 1888. | |
| Local Government Board's Provisional Orders Confirmation (No. 11) Act 1903 | 3 Edw. 7. c. lxiv | 30 June 1903 |
An Act to confirm certain Provisional Orders of the Local Government Board relating to the Ashbourne the Guildford Godalming and Woking and the South Shields (Rural) and Southwick-on-Wear Joint Hospital Districts.
| | Ashbourne Joint Hospital Order 1903 Provisional Order for forming a United District under Section 279 of the Public Health Act 1875. (Note: Public Health Act 1875 (38 & 39 Vict. c. 55)) | |
| | Guildford, Godalming and Woking Joint Hospital Order 1903 Provisional Order for altering certain Confirming Acts. | |
| | South Shields Rural and Southwick-on-Wear Joint Hospital Order 1903 Provisional Order for forming a United District under Section 279 of the Public Health Act 1875. | |
| Local Government Board's Provisional Orders Confirmation (Gas) Act 1903 | 3 Edw. 7. c. lxv | 30 June 1903 |
An Act to confirm certain Provisional Orders of the Local Government Board relating to Cudworth Hucknall-under-Huthwaite and Meltham.
| | Cudworth Gas Order 1903 Provisional Order under the Gas and Water Works Facilities Act 1870. (Note: Gas and Water Works Facilities Act 1870 (33 & 34 Vict. c. 70)) | |
| | Hucknall-under-Huthwaite Order 1903 Provisional Order under the Gas and Water Works Facilities Act 1870. | |
| | Meltham Gas Order 1903 Provisional Order under the Gas and Water Works Facilities Act 1870 and the Gas and Water Works Facilities Act 1870 Amendment Act 1873. (Note: Gas and Water Works Facilities Act 1870 Amendment Act 1873 (36 & 37 Vict. c. 89)) | |
| St. Luke's Church and Parish Quoad Sacra Edinburgh Order Confirmation Act 1903 | 3 Edw. 7. c. lxvi | 30 June 1903 |
An Act to confirm a Provisional Order under the Private Legislation Procedure (Scotland) Act 1899 relating to St. Luke's Church and Parish Quoad Sacra Elinburgh.
| | St. Luke's (Edinburgh) Church and Parish quoad sacra Order 1903 Provisional Order to authorise the Annexation of St. Luke's Parish Quoad Sacra Edinburgh to one or more of the adjoining parishes the sale of the Church of that Parish the application of the endowments and the price of the Church to the endowment of a new parish and the provision of a Church for such new parish and other matters relating to these objects. | |
| Naval Works Provisional Order Confirmation Act 1903 (repealed) | 3 Edw. 7. c. lxvii | 30 June 1903 |
An Act to confirm a Provisional Order of the Admiralty under the Naval Works Act 1895. (Note: Naval Works Act 1895 (58 & 59 Vict. c. 35)) (Repealed by Statute Law (Repeals) Act 2008 (c. 12))
| | Britannia Royal Naval College Order 1903 A Provisional Order made in pursuance of Section Two of the Naval Works Act 1895 authorising the taking for the purposes of His Majesty's Navy of certain lands at or near the borough of Dartmouth. | |
| Pier and Harbour Orders Confirmation (No. 1) Act 1903 | 3 Edw. 7. c. lxviii | 30 June 1903 |
An Act to confirm certain Provisional Orders made by the Board of Trade under the General Pier and Harbour Act 1861 (Note: General Pier and Harbour Act 1861 (24 & 25 Vict. c. 45)) relating to Llandudno Galway and Scrabster.
| | Llandudno Victoria Pier Order 1903 Provisional Order for Amending the Llandudno Victoria Pier Order 1897 with respect to the time for the commencement and completion of the Works under that Order. | |
| | Galway Harbour Order 1903 Provisional Order for altering for the purposes of rating the method of calculating the register tonnage of steam vessels and steam tugs respectively entering using or touching at the Port and Harbour of Galway and for other purposes. | |
| | Scrabster Harbour Order 1903 Provisional Order for reviving the powers for the construction of Works at the Harbour of Scrabster in the County of Caithness authorised by the Scrabster Harbour Order 1897. | |
| Grangemouth Water Order Confirmation Act 1903 | 3 Edw. 7. c. lxix | 30 June 1903 |
An Act to confirm a Provisional Order under the Private Legislation Procedure (Scotland) Act 1899 relating to Grangemouth water.
| | Grangemouth Water Order 1903 Provisional Order to authorise the Provost Magistrates and Councillors of the Burgh of Grangemouth to provide an additional Water Supply and to construct and maintain new Waterworks and for other purposes. | |
| Lanarkshire Electricity and Refuse Destruction Order Confirmation Act 1903 (repealed) | 3 Edw. 7. c. lxx | 30 June 1903 |
An Act to confirm a Provisional Order under the Private Legislation Procedure (Scotland) Act 1899 relating to Lanarkshire electricity and refuse destruction. (Repealed by South of Scotland Electricity Order Confirmation Act 1956 (4 & 5 Eliz. 2. c. xciv))
| | Lanarkshire Electricity and Refuse Destruction Order 1903 Provisional Order to make provisions with regard to the Supply of Electricity and the Destruction of Refuse in Special Lighting and Scavenging Districts in the county of Lanark to increase the Special District Rates and for other purposes. | |
| Forth Navigation Order Confirmation Act 1903 | 3 Edw. 7. c. lxxi | 30 June 1903 |
An Act to confirm a Provisional Order under the Private Legislation Procedure (Scotland) Act 1899 relating to the Forth Navigation.
| | Forth Navigation Order 1903 Provisional Order to authorise the Commissioners of the Forth Navigation to improve and deepen certain parts of the bed or navigable channel of the River Forth to make works to acquire lands and for other purposes. | |
| Caledonian Railway Order Confirmation Act 1903 | 3 Edw. 7. c. lxxii | 30 June 1903 |
An Act to confirm a Provisional Order under the Private Legislation Procedure (Scotland) Act 1899 relating to the Caledonian Railway.
| | Caledonian Railway Order 1903 Provisional Order to confer further powers on the Caledonian Railway Company to sanction their branch railway to the Provan Gasworks in Glasgow to extend the time for the purchase of lands by the Caledonian Railway Company and for the completion of works by that Company and the Callander and Oban Railway Company to provide for the raising of capital in lieu of borrowing by the Glasgow and Renfrew District Railway Company and for other purposes. | |
| Edinburgh Corporation (Markets, Slaughter-houses, &c.) Order Confirmation Act 1903 (repealed) | 3 Edw. 7. c. lxxiii | 30 June 1903 |
An Act to confirm a Provisional Order under the Private Legislation Procedure (Scotland) Act 1899 relating to Edinburgh Corporation (Markets Slaughter-houses &c.) (Repealed by Edinburgh Corporation Order Confirmation Act 1933 (24 & 25 Geo. 5. c. v))
| | Edinburgh Corporation (Markets, Slaughter-houses, &c.) Order 1903 Provisional Order to authorise the Lord Provost Magistrates and Council of the City of Edinburgh to provide new Markets and Slaughter-houses and to provide and maintain a Municipal Hall to construct Works to acquire Lands to amend Acts and for other purposes. | |
| North British Railway (General Powers) Order Confirmation Act 1903 | 3 Edw. 7. c. lxxiv | 30 June 1903 |
An Act to confirm a Provisional Order under the Private Legislation Procedure (Scotland) Act 1899 relating to the North British Railway.
| | North British Railway (General Powers) Order 1903 Provisional Order to authorise the North British Railway Company to construct certain new Railways and Widenings to acquire and to hold additional Lands to extend the time for the purchase of Lands and for the completion of certain Railways to raise additional Capital and for other purposes. | |
| Local Government Board (Ireland) Provisional Orders Confirmation (Housing of Working Classes) Act 1903 | 3 Edw. 7. c. lxxv | 21 July 1903 |
An Act to confirm certain Provisional Orders of the Local Government Board for Ireland relating to the Urban Districts of Athlone and Kingstown (two).
| | Athlone Order 1903 Provisional Order to enable the Urban District Council of Athlone to put in force the Compulsory Clauses of the Lands Clauses Acts. | |
| | Kingstown (No. 1) Order 1903 Provisional Order for confirming an Improvement Scheme under Part I. of the Housing of the Working Classes Act 1890. | |
| | Kingstown (No. 2) Order 1903 Provisional Order to enable the Urban District Council of Kingstown to put in force the Compulsory Clauses of the Lands Clauses Acts. | |
| Local Government Board's Provisional Orders Confirmation (Poor Law) Act 1903 (repealed) | 3 Edw. 7. c. lxxvi | 21 July 1903 |
An Act to confirm certain Provisional Orders of the Local Government Board relating to the City of Oxford. (Repealed by Oxford Corporation Act 1933 (23 & 24 Geo. 5. c. xxi))
| | Oxford (Poor Law) Order (No. 2) 1903 Provisional Order for altering the Oxford Poor Act 1854. (Note: Oxford Poor Act 1854 (17 & 18 Vict. c. ccxix)) | |
| Local Government Board's Provisional Orders Confirmation (No. 9) Act 1903 | 3 Edw. 7. c. lxxvii | 21 July 1903 |
An Act to confirm certain Provisional Orders of the Local Government Board relating to Barry Fenton Leeds and Tonbridge and the Ports of Hartlepool and Manchester.
| | Barry Order 1903 Provisional Order to enable the Urban District Council of Barry to put in force the Compulsory Clauses of the Lands Clauses Acts. | |
| | Fenton Order 1903 Provisional Order to enable the Urban District Council of Fenton to put in force the Compulsory Clauses of the Lands Clauses Acts. | |
| | Leeds Order 1903 Provisional Order to enable the Urban Sanitary Authority for the City of Leeds to put in force the Compulsory Clauses of the Lands Clauses Acts. | |
| | Tonbridge Order 1903 Provisional Order to enable the Urban District Council of Tonbridge to put in force the Compulsory Clauses of the Lands Clauses Acts. | |
| | Hartlepools Order 1903 Provisional Order for repealing a Confirming Act (Note: Local Government Board's Provisional Orders Confirmation (No. 6) Act 1885 (48 & 49 Vict. c. cxxviii)) and for altering a Confirming Act. (Note: Local Government Board's Provisional Orders Confirmation (Bath, &c.) Act 1881 (44 & 45 Vict. c. xv)) | |
| | Manchester Port Order 1903 Provisional Order for altering a Confirming Act. (Note: Local Government Board's Provisional Order Confirmation (Port) Act 1901 (1 Edw. 7. c. clxx)) | |
| Local Government Board's Provisional Orders Confirmation (No. 10) Act 1903 | 3 Edw. 7. c. lxxviii | 21 July 1903 |
An Act to confirm certain Provisional Orders of the Local Government Board relating to Ashton-under-Lyne Darwen Newton-in-Makerfield Prestwich and Yaynor and Penderyn.
| | Ashton-under-Lyne Order 1903 Provisional Order for altering certain Local Acts and a Confirming Act. (Note: Local Government Board's Provisional Orders Confirmation (No. 13) Act 1900 (63 & 64 Vict. c. clxxxii)) | |
| | Darwen Order 1903 Provisional Order for partially repealing and altering the Darwen Corporation Act 1899. (Note: Darwen Corporation Act 1899 (62 & 63 Vict. c. ccxxiv)) | |
| | Newton-in-Makerfield Order 1903 Provisiomal Order for altering the Newton District Improvement Act 1855 (Note: Newton District Improvement Act 1855 (18 & 19 Vict. c. c)) and certain Confirming Acts. | |
| | Prestwich Order 1903 Provisional Order to enable the Urban District Council of Prestwich to put in force the Compulsory Clauses of the Lands Clauses Acts. | |
| | Vaynor and Penderyn Order 1903 Provisional Order to enable the Rural District Council of Vaynor and Penderyn to put in force the Compulsory Clauses of the Lands Clauses Acts. | |
| Local Government Board's Provisional Orders Confirmation (No. 12) Act 1903 | 3 Edw. 7. c. lxxix | 21 July 1903 |
An Act to confirm certain Provisional Orders of the Local Government Board relating to Blackpool Conway and Spalding and the Darenth Valley Main Sewerage District.
| | Blackpool Order 1903 Provisional Order for altering certain Local Acts. | |
| | Conway Order 1903 Provisional Order for altering the Conway Bridge Act 1878. (Note: Conway Bridge Act 1878 (41 & 42 Vict. c. lxviii)) | |
| | Spalding Gas Order 1903 Provisional Order for altering a Local Act. (Note: Spalding Improvement Act 1853 (16 & 17 Vict. c. cxxxix)) | |
| | Darenth Valley Main Sewerage Order 1903 Provisional Order for altering certain Confirming Acts. | |
| Local Government Board's Provisional Orders Confirmation (No. 14) Act 1903 | 3 Edw. 7. c. lxxx | 21 July 1903 |
An Act to confirm certain Provisional Orders of the Local Government Board relating to Colne and Swansea and the South Staffordshire Joint Small-Pox Hospital District.
| | Colne Order 1903 Provisional Order for altering certain Local Acts. | |
| | Swansea Order 1903 Provisional Order for altering certain Local Acts. | |
| | South Staffordshire Joint Small-pox Hospital Order 1903 Provisional Order for forming a United District under Section 279 of the Public Health Act 1875. | |
| Local Government Board's Provisional Order Confirmation (No. 16) Act 1903 | 3 Edw. 7. c. lxxxi | 21 July 1903 |
An Act to confirm a Provisional Order of the Local Government Board relating to the Counties of London and Surrey.
| | Counties of London and Surrey (Wandsworth and Mitcham) Order 1903 Provisional Order made in pursuance of Sections 54 and 59 of the Local Government Act 1888 for altering the Boundary between Counties. | |
| Local Government Board's Provisional Orders Confirmation (No. 17) Act 1903 | 3 Edw. 7. c. lxxxii | 21 July 1903 |
An Act to confirm certain Provisional Orders of the Local Government Board relating to Bury and the Bury and District Joint Hospital District.
| | Bury (Transfer of Hospitals) Order 1903 Provisional Order for altering certain Local Acts. | |
| | Bury and District Joint Hospital Order 1903 Provisional Order for forming a United District under Section 279 of the Public Health Act 1875. | |
| Local Government Board's Provisional Order Confirmation (No. 18) Act 1903 (repealed) | 3 Edw. 7. c. lxxxiii | 21 July 1903 |
An Act to confirm a Provisional Order of the Local Government Board relating to Wolverhampton. (Repealed by Wolverhampton Corporation Act 1969 (c. lx))
| | Wolverhampton Order 1903 Provisional Order for altering the Wolverhampton Improvement Act 1869 (Note: Wolverhampton Improvement Act 1869 (32 & 33 Vict. c. cxxxi)) and certain Confirming Acts. | |
| Military Lands Provisional Orders Confirmation Act 1903 (repealed) | 3 Edw. 7. c. lxxxiv | 21 July 1903 |
An Act to confirm certain Provisional Orders of the Secretary of State under the Military Lands Act 1892. (Note: Military Lands Act 1892 (55 & 56 Vict. c. 43)) (Repealed by Statute Law (Repeals) Act 2008 (c. 12))
| | Bordon Military Lands Order 1903 A Provisional Order made in pursuance of Section Two of the Military Lands Act 1892 authorising the taking for military purposes of certain lands in the Parish of Headley and County of Southampton. | |
| | Windsor Military Lands Order 1903 A Provisional Order made in pursuance of Section Two of the Military Lands Act 1892 authorising the taking for military purposes of certain lands in the Royal Borough of Windsor. | |
| Education Board Provisional Orders Confirmation (East Ham, &c.) Act 1903 | 3 Edw. 7. c. lxxxv | 21 July 1903 |
An Act to confirm certain Provisional Orders made by the Board of Education under the Elementary Education Acts 1870 to 1900 to enable the School Boards for East Ham Lower Michaelstone Manchester and Willesden to put in force the Lands Clauses Acts.
| | East Ham (Essex) School Board Order 1903 Provisional Order for putting in force the Lands Clauses Acts. | |
| | Lower Michaelstone (Glamorgan) School Board Order 1903 Provisional Order for putting in force the Lands Clauses Acts. | |
| | Manchester School Board Order 1903 Provisional Order for putting in force the Lands Clauses Acts. | |
| | Willesden (Middlesex) School Board Order 1903 Provisional Order for putting in force the Lands Clauses Acts. | |
| Hamilton Burgh Order Confirmation Act 1903 | 3 Edw. 7. c. lxxxvi | 21 July 1903 |
An Act to confirm a Provisional Order under the Burgh Police (Scotland) Act 1892 (Note: Burgh Police (Scotland) Act 1892 (55 & 56 Vict. c. 55)) relating to Hamilton Burgh Water and Town Hall.
| | Hamilton Burgh Order 1903 Provisional Order. | |
| Broughty Ferry Gas Order Confirmation Act 1903 (repealed) | 3 Edw. 7. c. lxxxvii | 21 July 1903 |
An Act to confirm a Provisional Order under the Burgh Police (Scotland) Act 1892 relating to Broughty Ferry Gas Supply. (Repealed by Dundee Boundaries Act 1913 (3 & 4 Geo. 5. c. lxxx))
| | Broughty Ferry Gas Order 1903 Provisional Order. | |
| Electric Lighting Orders Confirmation (No. 5) Act 1903 | 3 Edw. 7. c. lxxxviii | 21 July 1903 |
An Act to confirm certain Provisional Orders made by the Board of Trade under the Electric Lighting Acts 1882 and 1888 relating to Abersychan Calverley Falmouth Horsforth Launceston Maesteg Walton-upon-Thames Warmley Whickham and Wigan (Rural).
| | Abersychan Electric Lighting Order 1903 Provisional Order granted by the Board of Trade under the Electric Lighting Acts 1882 and 1888 to the Urban District Council of Abersychan in respect of the Urban District of Abersychan in the County of Monmouth. | |
| | Calverley Electric Lighting Order 1903 Provisional Order granted by the Board of Trade under the Electric Lighting Acts 1882 and 1888 to the Urban District Council of Calverley in respect of the Urban District of Calverley in the West Riding of the County of York. | |
| | Falmouth Electric Lighting Order 1903 Provisional Order granted by the Board of Trade under the Electric Lighting Acts 1882 and 1888 to the Mayor Aldermen and Burgesses of the Borough of Falmouth in respect of the Borough of Falmouth in the County of Cornwall. | |
| | Horsforth Electric Lighting Order 1903 Provisional Order granted by the Board of Trade under the Electric Lighting Acts 1882 and 1888 to the Urban District Council of Horsforth in respect of the Urban District of Horsforth in the West Riding of the County of York. | |
| | Launceston Electric Lighting Order 1903 Provisional Order granted by the Board of Trade under the Electric Lighting Acts 1882 and 1888 to the Mayor Aldermen and Burgesses of the Borough of Dunheved otherwise Launceston in respect of the Borough of Dunheved otherwise Launceston in the County of Cornwall. | |
| | Maesteg Electric Lighting Order 1903 Provisional Order granted by the Board of Trade under the Electric Lighting Acts 1882 and 1888 to the Urban District Council of Maesteg in respect of the Urban District of Maesteg in the County of Glamorgan. | |
| | Walton-upon-Thames Electric Lighting Order 1903 Provisional Order granted by the Board of Trade under the Electric Lighting Acts 1882 and 1888 to the Urban District Council of Walton-upon-Thames in respect of the Urban District of Walton-upon-Thames in the County of Surrey. | |
| | Warmley Electric Lighting Order 1903 Provisional Order granted by the Board of Trade under the Electric Lighting Acts 1882 and 1888 to the Warmley Rural District Council in respect of the Rural District of Warmley in the County of Gloucester. | |
| | Whickam Electric Lighting Order 1903 Provisional Order granted by the Board of Trade under the Electric Lighting Acts 1882 and 1888 to the Urban District Council of Whickham in respect of the Urban District of Whickham in the County of Durham. | |
| | Wigan Rural District Council Electric Lighting Order 1903 Provisional Order granted by the Board of Trade under the Electric Lighting Acts 1882 and 1888 to the Rural District Council of Wigan in respect of the Rural District of Wigan in the County of Lancaster. | |
| Electric Lighting Orders Confirmation (No. 7) Act 1903 | 3 Edw. 7. c. lxxxix | 21 July 1903 |
An Act to confirm certain Provisional Orders made by the Board of Trade under the Electric Lighting Acts 1882 and 1888 relating to Cambridge and District Isle of Sheppey and District Sandwich Deal Walmer and District Sittingbourne and Milton Strood and Dartford (Rural Districts) Tadcaster and District (Extension) Uxbridge and District (Extension) and Wimbledon (Extension).
| | Cambridge and District Electric Lighting Order 1903 Provisional Order granted by the Board of Trade under the Electric Lighting Acts 1882 and 1888 to the Cambridge Electric Supply Company Limited in respect of the Urban District of Chesterton and a portion of the Rural District of Chesterton in the County of Cambridge. | |
| | Isle of Sheppey and District Electric Lighting Order 1903 Provisional Order granted by the Board of Trade under the Electric Lighting Acts 1882 and 1888 to the County of Kent Electrical Power Distribution Company Limited in respect of the Borough of Queenborough and the Rural District of Sheppey in the County of Kent. | |
| | Sandwich Deal Walmar and District Electric Lighting Order 1903 Provisional Order granted by the Board of Trade under the Electric Lighting Acts 1882 and 1888 to the Kent Electric Power Syndicate Limited in respect of the Boroughs of Sandwich and Deal the Urban District of Walmer and the Rural District of Eastry all in the County of Kent. | |
| | Sittingbourne and Milton Electric Lighting Order 1903 Provisional Order granted by the Board of Trade under the Electric Lighting Acts 1882 and 1888 to the Kent Electric Power Syndicate Limited in respect of the Urban Districts of Sittingbourne and Milton-next-Sittingbourne in the County of Kent. | |
| | Strood and Dartford (Rural Districts) Electric Lighting Order 1903 Provisional Order granted by the Board of Trade under the Electric Lighting Acts 1882 and 1888 to the Kent Electric Power Syndicate Limited in respect of the Rural District of Strood and the Parishes of Stone and Swanscombe in the Rural District of Dartford in the County of Kent. | |
| | Tadcaster and District (Extension) Electric Lighting Order 1903 Provisional Order granted by the Board of Trade under the Electric Lighting Acts 1882 and 1888 to the Tadcaster Electricity Company Limited in respect of the extension of their existing area of supply to the Township of Boston Spa and part of the Township of Thorparch all in the Rural District of Wetherby in the County of York. | |
| | Uxbridge and District Electricity Supply (Extension) Order 1903 Provisional Order granted by the Board of Trade under the Electric Lighting Acts 1882 and 1888 to the Uxbridge and District Electric Supply Company Limited to amend the Uxbridge and District Electricity Supply Order 1900 and to extend their Area of Supply to the Parishes of Yiewsley West Drayton Harefield and Northolt in the Uxbridge Rural District and to the Greenford Urban District both in the County of Middlesex and to the Parishes of Gerrard's Cross and Fulmer in the Eton Rural District and to the Parishes of Chalfont St. Peter and Chalfont St. Giles in the Amersham Rural District both in the County of Buckingham. | |
| | Wimbledon Electric Lighting (Extension) Order 1903 Provisional Order granted by the Board of Trade under the Electric Lighting Acts 1882 and 1888 to the Urban District Council of Wimbledon in respect of the Parish of Merton in the Rural District of Croydon in the County of Surrey. | |
| Pier and Harbour Orders Confirmation (No. 6) Act 1903 | 3 Edw. 7. c. xc | 21 July 1903 |
An Act to confirm certain Provisional Orders made by the Board of Trade under the General Pier and Harbour Act 1861 relating to Truro and Salen (Mull)
| | Truro Harbour Order 1903 Provisional Order for the construction of further Works in Truro Harbour and for conferring further powers upon the Mayor Aldermen and Citizens of the City of Truro in the County of Cornwall in relation to that Harbour. | |
| | Salen (Mull) Pier Order 1903 Provisional Order for the Construction and Maintenance of a Pier and Works and Access Road at Salen in the Island of Mull in the County of Argyll. | |
| Southampton Harbour Act 1903 | 3 Edw. 7. c. xci | 21 July 1903 |
An Act to consolidate the existing loans of the Southampton Harbour Board and to empower them to raise further money and to authorise contributions by and agreements with the London and South Western Railway Company and the Mayor Aldermen and Burgesses of the borough of Southampton and for other purposes.
| King's College London Act 1903 (repealed) | 3 Edw. 7. c. xcii | 21 July 1903 |
An Act to amend King's College London Act 1882. (Note: King's College London Act 1882 (45 & 46 Vict. c. xiii)) (Repealed by King's College London Act 1978 (c. xii))
| Scunthorpe Urban District Water Act 1903 | 3 Edw. 7. c. xciii | 21 July 1903 |
An Act to authorise the Scunthorpe Urban District Council to construct waterworks in lieu of the waterworks authorised by the Scunthorpe Urban District Gas and Water Act 1899 (Note: Scunthorpe Urban District Gas and Water Act 1899 (62 & 63 Vict. c. xcvii)) and for other purposes
| Ipswich Gas Act 1903 | 3 Edw. 7. c. xciv | 21 July 1903 |
An Act to confer further powers upon the Ipswich Gas Light Company.
| Lanarkshire and Dumbartonshire Railway Act 1903 | 3 Edw. 7. c. xcv | 21 July 1903 |
An Act to authorise the Lanarkshire and Dumbartonshire Railway Company to raise further moneys to enable the Caledonian Railway Company to subscribe for additional shares or stock to sanction certain existing railways and for other purposes.
| New Hunstanton Improvement Act 1903 | 3 Edw. 7. c. xcvi | 21 July 1903 |
An Act to authorise the Urban District Council of New Hunstanton to acquire land for water and gas purposes to construct an outfall sewer and to make further provision in regard to the health local government improvement and finance of the Urban District and for other purposes.
| British Gas Light Company Limited (Norwich) Act 1903 | 3 Edw. 7. c. xcvii | 21 July 1903 |
An Act for empowering the British Gas Light Company Limited to expend further capital at Norwich.
| Hastings Tramways (Extensions) Act 1903 (repealed) | 3 Edw. 7. c. xcviii | 21 July 1903 |
An Act to empower the Hastings Tramways Company to construct extension tramways in the county borough of Hastings and for other purposes. (Repealed by Hastings Tramways Act 1957 (5 & 6 Eliz. 2. c. xxxvi))
| Jewish Colonization Association Act 1903 (repealed) | 3 Edw. 7. c. xcix | 21 July 1903 |
An Act to extend the powers of the Jewish Colonization Association and for other purposes. (Repealed by Jewish Colonization Association Act 1944 (7 & 8 Geo. 6. c. iii))
| Hampton Court Gas Act 1903 | 3 Edw. 7. c. c | 21 July 1903 |
An Act to authorise the Hampton Court Gas Company to raise additional capital to convert their existing capital to enlarge their works to amend their existing Act (Note: Hampton Court Gas Act 1867 (30 & 31 Vict. c. lxiii)) and for other purposes.
| Charing Cross, Euston and Hampstead Railway Act 1903 | 3 Edw. 7. c. ci | 21 July 1903 |
An Act to confer further powers upon the Charing Cross Euston and Hampstead Railway Company to authorise agreements with the Underground Electric Railways Company of London Limited and for other purposes.
| Wolverhampton and Cannock Chase Railway (Extension of Time) Act 1903 | 3 Edw. 7. c. cii | 21 July 1903 |
An Act to extend the time for the compulsory purchase of lands and for the construction and completion of the Wolverhampton and Cannock Chase Railway and for other purposes.
| London and North Western Railway Act 1903 | 3 Edw. 7. c. ciii | 21 July 1903 |
An Act for conferring further powers upon the London and North Western Railway Company in relation to their own undertaking and upon that Company and the Midland Railway Company in relation to their respective joint undertakings and upon the Shropshire Union Railways and Canal Company in relation to their undertaking and for other purposes.
| Nantwich Urban District Council Act 1903 | 3 Edw. 7. c. civ | 21 July 1903 |
An Act to empower the Urban District Council of Nantwich to supply gas and to provide for the transfer of the undertaking of the Nantwich Gas Company Limited to the Council and to make further and better provision with regard to the supply of electricity and for the improvement health local government and finance of the district and for other purposes.
| Sheffield and South Yorkshire Navigation Act 1903 | 3 Edw. 7. c. cv | 21 July 1903 |
An Act to confer further powers upon the Sheffield and South Yorkshire Navigation Company.
| Torquay Corporation Water Act 1903 | 3 Edw. 7. c. cvi | 21 July 1903 |
An Act to authorise the Corporation of Torquay to construct additional waterworks and for other purposes.
| Nelson Corporation Act 1903 (repealed) | 3 Edw. 7. c. cvii | 21 July 1903 |
An Act to extend the time for the construction of certain waterworks authorised by the Nelson Local Board Act 1888 (Note: Nelson Local Board Act 1888 (51 & 52 Vict. c. cxlvi)) for protecting the water supply from pollution and to make better provision in regard to the supply of water and for other purposes. (Repealed by County of Lancashire Act 1984 (c. xxi))
| West Cumberland Electric Tramways Act 1903 | 3 Edw. 7. c. cviii | 21 July 1903 |
An Act to extend the periods for the commencement of the construction and for the completion of the tramways tramroads and other works and for the taking of lands authorised by the West Cumberland Electric Tramways Act 1901 (Note: West Cumberland Electric Tramways Act 1901 (1 Edw. 7. c. ccli)) to extend the area within which the West Cumberland Electric Tramways Company may supply electricity and to confer on that Company further and additional powers with regard to such supply and for other purposes.
| Fishguard and Rosslare Railways and Harbours Act 1903 | 3 Edw. 7. c. cix | 21 July 1903 |
An Act to confer further powers upon the Fishguard and Rosslare Railways and Harbours Company for the construction of a railway and other works and the acquisition of lands and to make provision as to a bridge over the river Suir at Waterford to empower the Great Western and Great Southern and Western Railway Companies to guarantee interest on the capital of the Company and for other purposes.
| Hexham Gas Act 1903 | 3 Edw. 7. c. cx | 21 July 1903 |
An Act to confer further powers upon the Hexham Gas Company.
| Cheshire Lines Act 1903 | 3 Edw. 7. c. cxi | 21 July 1903 |
An Act to enable the Cheshire Lines Committee to make new railways to acquire additional lands and for other purposes.
| Highland and Invergarry and Fort Augustus Railways Act 1903 | 3 Edw. 7. c. cxii | 21 July 1903 |
An Act to confirm an agreement between the Highland Railway Company and the Invergarry and Fort Augustus Railway Company to enable the Highland Railway Company to erect and maintain a hotel at Dornoch to apply their capital thereto and for other purposes.
| Port Talbot Railway and Docks Act 1903 | 3 Edw. 7. c. cxiii | 21 July 1903 |
An Act to authorise the Port Talbot Railway and Docks Company to raise further moneys for the purposes of their undertaking.
| Merthyr Tydfil Urban District Council Act 1903 | 3 Edw. 7. c. cxiv | 21 July 1903 |
An Act to empower the Urban District Council of Merthyr Tydfil to construct additional waterworks and a street improvement and to make further and better provision for the good government health and improvement of the district and for other purposes.
| Pontypridd Urban District Council Act 1903 | 3 Edw. 7. c. cxv | 21 July 1903 |
An Act to empower the Pontypridd Urban District Council to make a new street and other street works to lay down a tramway and to confer further powers upon the Council with regard to their gas and electricity undertakings and with regard to the good government and improvement of the district.
| Frinton-on-Sea Defences Act 1903 (repealed) | 3 Edw. 7. c. cxvi | 21 July 1903 |
An Act to authorise the Council for the Urban District of Frinton-on-Sea in the county of Essex to construct and maintain sea-walls and other works at Frinton-on-Sea and to improve and regulate the sea front of the said district and for other purposes. (Repealed by Essex Act 1987 (c. xx))
| Cardiff Railway Act 1903 | 3 Edw. 7. c. cxvii | 21 July 1903 |
An Act for empowering the Cardiff Railway Company to construct a new railway and works and to abandon the construction of a portion of railway already authorised for extending the time for the completion of certain railways and works and for other purposes.
| Aston Manor Improvement Act 1903 | 3 Edw. 7. c. cxviii | 21 July 1903 |
An Act to make further and better provision with regard to the electric light undertaking of the Council and for the improvement, health local government and finance of the district and for other purposes.
| Grindleford, Baslow and Bakewell Railway Act 1903 | 3 Edw. 7. c. cxix | 21 July 1903 |
An Act for making railways in the county of Derby from the Midland Railway (Dore and Chinley Branch) at Grindleford to the Midland Railway (Derby and Manchester Branch) at Bakewell and for other purposes.
| London, Brighton and South Coast Railway Act 1903 | 3 Edw. 7. c. cxx | 21 July 1903 |
An Act to confer further powers on the London Brighton and South Coast Railway Company and for other purposes.
| Mersey Docks and Harbour Board Act 1903 | 3 Edw. 7. c. cxxi | 21 July 1903 |
An Act to authorise the Mersey Docks and Harbour Board to construct additional dock works on the Liverpool side of the River Mersey to amend in certain respects the Acts relating to that Board and for other purposes.
| Broadstairs Gas Act 1903 | 3 Edw. 7. c. cxxii | 21 July 1903 |
An Act for conferring further Powers on the Broadstairs Gas Company.
| Hyde Corporation Act 1903 | 3 Edw. 7. c. cxxiii | 21 July 1903 |
An Act to make further and better provision with regard to the improvement health local government and finance of the borough of Hyde and for other purposes.
| Leigh Corporation Act 1903 | 3 Edw. 7. c. cxxiv | 21 July 1903 |
An Act to make provision as to the water supply of the borough of Leigh and the Urban District of Hindley to enable the Corporation of Leigh to make new waterworks tramways and street improvements and to make further provisions for the health local government and improvement of the said borough and for other purposes.
| Great Northern Railway Act 1903 | 3 Edw. 7. c. cxxv | 21 July 1903 |
An Act to confer further powers upon the Great Northern Railway Company.
| Metropolitan District Railway Act 1903 | 3 Edw. 7. c. cxxvi | 21 July 1903 |
An Act to empower the Metropolitan District Railway Company to deviate the railway authorised by the Metropolitan District Railway Act 1897 (Note: Metropolitan District Railway Act 1897 (60 & 61 Vict. c. ccxlvii)) and to construct other railways to acquire lands to lay down electric cables to raise further capital to acquire the Hounslow and Metropolitan Railway and for other purposes.
| Midland Railway (Belfast and Northern Counties Railway Purchase) Act 1903 | 3 Edw. 7. c. cxxvii | 21 July 1903 |
An Act to provide for the vesting of the undertaking of the Belfast and Northern Counties Railway Company in the Midland Railway Company.
| Pier and Harbour Orders Confirmation (No. 2) Act 1903 | 3 Edw. 7. c. cxxviii | 11 August 1903 |
An Act to confirm certain Provisional Orders made by the Board of Trade under the General Pier and Harbour Act 1861 relating to Dawlish Bude and Sandown.
| | Dawlish Pier Order 1903 Provisional Order for the construction maintenance and regulation of a Pier at Dawlish in the County of Devon. | |
| | Bude Harbour Order 1903 Order for amending the Stratton and Bude Improvement Act 1901 (Note: Stratton and Bude Improvement Act 1901 (1 Edw. 7. c. cclviii)) in relation to Bude Harbour. | |
| | Sandown Pier Order 1903 Provisional Order for amending the Sandown Pier Orders 1874 and 1893 as to rates and otherwise and for repealing the Sandown Pier Order 1887. | |
| Pier and Harbour Orders Confirmation (No. 3) Act 1903 | 3 Edw. 7. c. cxxix | 11 August 1903 |
An Act to confirm certain Provisional Orders made by the Board of Trade under the General Pier and Harbour Act 1861 relating to Aultbea and Pennan.
| | Aultbea Pier Order 1903 Provisional Order for the construction maintenance and regulation of a Pier at Aultbea in the Parish of Gairloch and County of Ross and Cromarty. | |
| | Pennan Harbour Order 1903 Order for incorporating a body of Trustees for the Harbour of Pennan in the Parish of Aberdour and County of Aberdeen and for the improvement maintenance and regulation of the Harbour. | |
| Pier and Harbour Orders Confirmation (No. 4) Act 1903 | 3 Edw. 7. c. cxxx | 11 August 1903 |
An Act to confirm certain Provisional Orders made by the Board of Trade under the General Pier and Harbour Act 1861 relating to Sligo Limerick and Dundalk.
| | Sligo Harbour Order 1903 Provisional Order for the construction of further Works in the Port and Harbour of Sligo and for conferring further powers upon the Sligo Harbour Commissioners in relation to the said Port and Harbour. | |
| | Limerick Harbour Order 1903 Provisional Order for altering for the purposes of rating the method of calculating the register tonnage of steam vessels and steam tugs using the Harbour of Limerick the charging and levying of harbour light dues and for other purposes. | |
| | Dundalk Harbour Order 1903 Provisional Order for altering for the purposes of rating the method of calculating the register tonnage of steam vessels and steam tugs respectively entering using or touching at the Harbour of Dundalk and for other purposes. | |
| Pier and Harbour Orders Confirmation (No. 5) Act 1903 | 3 Edw. 7. c. cxxxi | 11 August 1903 |
An Act to confirm certain Provisional Orders made by the Board of Trade under the General Pier and Harbour Act 1861 relating to Boscombe and Bournemouth Carnarvon Gorleston Herne Bay and Avoch.
| | Boscombe and Bournemouth Piers Order 1903 Provisional Order for the transfer of Boscombe Pier to the Corporation of Bournemouth and for other purposes in connexion with the Boscombe and Bournemouth Piers. | |
| | Carnarvon Harbour Order 1903 Provisional Order for amending an Act of the thirty-third year of His late Majesty King George III. Chapter 123. intituled "An Act for enlarging deepening cleansing improving and regulating the Harbour of Carnarvon in the County of Carnarvon" (Note: Carnarvon Harbour Act 1793 (33 Geo. 3. c. 123)) and for amending an Act of the twenty-ninth year of His late Majesty King George III. Chapter 24. intituled "An Act for the further improvement of the Harbour in the County of Carnarvon" (Note: Caernarvon Harbour Act 1809 (49 Geo. 3. c. xxiv)) and for other purposes relating thereto and for the regulation of the Harbour. | |
| | Gorleston Pier Order 1903 Provisional Order for the construction maintenance and regulation of a Pier at Gorleston in the County Borough of Great Yarmouth in the County of Norfolk. | |
| | Herne Bay Pier Order 1903 Provisional Order for authorising the Herne Bay Pier Company Limited to widen and extend their Pier at Herne Bay and for other purposes connected therewith. | |
| | Avoch Harbour Order 1903 Provisional Order for the Construction Maintenance and Regulation of a Pier and Works at the Harbour of Avoch in the County of Ross and Cromarty. | |
| Gas Orders Confirmation (No. 1) Act 1903 | 3 Edw. 7. c. cxxxii | 11 August 1903 |
An Act to confirm certain Provisional Orders made by the Board of Trade under the Gas and Water Works Facilities Act 1870 relating to Cobham Gas Conisbrough Gas Hailsham Gas St Ives (Hunts) Gas and Woking District Gas.
| | Cobham Gas Order 1903 | |
| | Conisbrough Gas Order 1903 | |
| | Hailsham Gas Order 1903 | |
| | St. Ives (Hunts.) Gas Order 1903 | |
| | Woking District Gas Order 1903 | |
| Gas Orders Confirmation (No. 2) Act 1903 | 3 Edw. 7. c. cxxxiii | 11 August 1903 |
An Act to confirm certain Provisional Orders made by the Board of Trade under the Gas and Water Works Facilities Act 1870 relating to Brading Harbour District Gas Crossgates Halton and Seacroft Gas Herne Bay Gas Pembroke Docks and Town Gas and Biddings District Gas.
| | Brading Harbour District Gas Order 1903 | |
| | Crossgates Halton and Seacroft Gas Order 1903 | |
| | Herne Bay Gas Order 1903 | |
| | Pembroke Docks and Town Gas Order 1903 | |
| | Riddings District Gas Order 1903 | |
| Water Orders Confirmation Act 1903 | 3 Edw. 7. c. cxxxiv | 11 August 1903 |
An Act to confirm certain Provisional Orders made by the Board of Trade under the Gas and Water Works Facilities Act 1870 relating to Bolsover and District Water Goring and Streatley District Water Leatherhead and District Water Ludgershall Water and Mid-Kent Water.
| | Bolsover and District Water Order 1903 | |
| | Goring and Streatley District Water Order 1903 | |
| | Leatherhead and District Water Order 1903 | |
| | Ludgershall Water Order 1903 | |
| | Mid-Kent Water Order 1903 | |
| Local Government Board's Provisional Orders Confirmation (No. 5) Act 1903 (repealed) | 3 Edw. 7. c. cxxxv | 11 August 1903 |
An Act to confirm certain Provisional Orders of the Local Government Board relating to the Metropolitan Boroughs of Hampstead Holborn and Lambeth. (Repealed by Local Law (Greater London Council and Inner London Boroughs) Order 1965 (SI 1965/540))
| | Hampstead Order 1903 Provisional Order to enable the Council of the Metropolitan Borough of Hampstead to put in force the Compulsory Clauses of the Lands Clauses Acts. | |
| | Holborn Order 1903 Provisional Order to enable the Council of the Metropolitan Borough of Holborn to put in force the Compulsory Clauses of the Lands Clauses Acts. | |
| Local Government Board's Provisional Orders Confirmation (No. 8) Act 1903 | 3 Edw. 7. c. cxxxvi | 11 August 1903 |
An Act to confirm certain Provisional Orders of the Local Government Board relating to the Auckland Shildon and Willington the Croydon and Wimbledon the Tarvin Malpas and Tarporley and the Windsor and Egham Joint Hospital Districts.
| | Auckland, Shildon and Willington Joint Hospital Order 1903 Provisional Order for altering a Confirming Act. (Note: Local Government Board's Provisional Orders Confirmation (No. 4) Act 1897 (60 & 61 Vict. c. lxix)) | |
| | Croydon and Wimbledon Joint Small-pox Hospital Order 1903 Provisional Order for altering a Confirming Act. (Note: Local Government Board's Provisional Orders Confirmation (No. 4) Act 1898 (61 & 62 Vict. c. lxxvii)) | |
| | Tarvin, Malpas and Tarporley Joint Hospital Order 1903 Provisional Order for forming a United District under Section 279 of the Public Health Act 1875. | |
| | Windsor and Egham Joint Hospital Order 1903 Provisional Order for forming a United District under Section 279 of the Public Health Act 1875. | |
| Local Government Board's Provisional Orders Confirmation (No. 13) Act 1903 | 3 Edw. 7. c. cxxxvii | 11 August 1903 |
An Act to confirm certain Provisional Orders of the Local Government Board relating to Dover and Yeovil.
| | Dover (Extension) Order 1903 Provisional Order made in pursuance of Sections 54 and 59 of the Local Government Act 1888. | |
| | Yeovil (Extension) Order 1903 Provisional Order made in pursuance of Sections 51 and 59 of the Local Government Act 1888. | |
| Drainage and Improvement of Lands Supplemental (Ireland) Act 1903 | 3 Edw. 7. c. cxxxviii | 11 August 1903 |
An Act to confirm a Provisional Order under the Drainage and Improvement of Lands Act (Ireland) 1863 (Note: Drainage and Improvement of Lands Act (Ireland) 1863 (26 & 27 Vict. c. 88)) and the Acts amending the same relating to the. Pallas River Drainage District in the County of Tipperary.
| | Pallas River (County Tipperary) Drainage District Order 1903 In the matter of the Pallas River Drainage District in the county of Tipperary. | |
| Local Government Board (Ireland) Provisional Orders Confirmation (No. 3) Act 1903 | 3 Edw. 7. c. cxxxix | 11 August 1903 |
An Act to confirm certain Provisional Orders of the Local Government Board for Ireland relating to the County of Wexford the Urban District of Wexford and the Town of Keady.
| | Keady Urban District Order 1903 Provisional Order for constituting the Town of Keady an Urban Sanitary District. | |
| | Wexford (Urban) Order 1903 Provisional Order to alter the financial relations between the Urban District of Wexford and the County of Wexford. | |
| Local Government Board (Ireland) Provisional Orders Confirmation (No. 5) Act 1903 | 3 Edw. 7. c. cxl | 11 August 1903 |
An Act to confirm certain Provisional Orders of the Local Government Board for Ireland relating to Castleblayney (Urban) Castleblayney (Rural) the port of Cork and the Portadown and Banbridge Joint Waterworks District.
| | Castleblayney Order 1903 Provisional Order to enable the Urban District Council of Castleblayney to put in force the Compulsory Clauses of the Lands Clauses Acts. | |
| | Castleblayney (Ballybay Town) Order 1903 Provisional Order to enable the Council of the Rural District of Castleblayney to put in force the Compulsory Clauses of the Lands Clauses Acts. | |
| | Cork Port Sanitary Order 1903 Provisional Order for constituting a Port Sanitary Authority. | |
| | Portadown and Banbridge Waterworks Order 1903 Provisional Order to enable the Portadown and Banbridge Joint Waterworks Board to put in force the Compulsory Clauses of the Lands Clauses Acts. | |
| Local Government Board (Ireland) Provisional Orders Confirmation (No. 7) Act 1903 | 3 Edw. 7. c. cxli | 11 August 1903 |
An Act to confirm certain Provisional Orders of the Local Government Board for Ireland relating to the Urban Districts of Ballymena Ballymoney Banbridge Bangor Carrickfergus Dromore Holywood Larne Lisburn Newry Newtownards Portrush and Warrenpoint and the Counties of Antrim Armagh and Down.
| | County of Antrim (Financial Relations) Order 1903 Provisional Order to alter the financial relations between the Urban County Districts of Ballymena Ballymoney Carrickfergus Larne Lisburn and Portrush in the County of Antrim and the County of Antrim. | |
| | Counties of Down and Armagh (Financial Relations) Order 1903 Prorisional Order to alter the financial relations between the Urban County Districts of Banbridge Bangor Dromore Holywood Newry Newtownards and Warrenpoint in the County of Down and the County of Down and between the Urban County District of Newry and the County of Armagh. | |
| Perth Corporation (Tramways) Order Confirmation Act 1903 | 3 Edw. 7. c. cxlii | 11 August 1903 |
An Act to confirm a Provisional Order under the Private Legislation Procedure (Scotland) Act 1899 relating to Perth Corporation (Tramways).
| | Perth Corporation (Tramways) Order 1903 Provisional Order to empower the Lord Provost Magistrates and Councillors of the City and Royal Burgh of Perth on the acquisition by them of the tramways of the Perth and District Tramways Company (Limited) to work and use the same and for other purposes. | |
| Aberdeen Corporation Tramways Order Confirmation Act 1903 (repealed) | 3 Edw. 7. c. cxliii | 11 August 1903 |
An Act to confirm a Provisional Order under the Private Legislation Procedure (Scotland) Act 1899 relating to Aberdeen Corporation Tramway (Repealed by Aberdeen Corporation (Administration, Finance, &c.) Order Confirmation Act 1940 (c.iii))
| | Aberdeen Corporation Tramways Order 1903 Provisional Order to authorise the Lord Provost Magistrates and Town Council of the City and Royal Burgh of Aberdeen to construct additional Tramways to borrow money for their Tramway and Gas Undertakings and for other purposes. | |
| Metropolitan Police Provisional Order Confirmation Act 1903 (repealed) | 3 Edw. 7. c. cxliv | 11 August 1903 |
An Act to confirm a Provisional Order made by one of His Majesty's Principal Secretaries of State under the Metropolitan Police Act 1886 (Note: Metropolitan Police Act 1886 (49 & 50 Vict. c. 22)) relating to land in the Royal Borough of Kensington. (Repealed by Statute Law (Repeals) Act 2008 (c. 12))
| | Order made by the Secretary of State under the Metropolitan Police Act 1886. | |
| Tramways Orders Confirmation (No. 1) Act 1903 | 3 Edw. 7. c. cxlv | 11 August 1903 |
An Act to confirm certain Provisional Orders made by the Board of Trade under the Tramways Act 1870 (Note: Tramways Act 1870 (33 & 34 Vict. c. 78)) relating to Burton-upon-Trent Corporation Tramways Bury Corporation Tramways Cardiff Corporation Tramways (Extension) Huddersfield Corporation Tramways Leeds Corporation Tramways Newcastle-upon-Tyne Corporation Tramways and Portobello and Musselburgh Tramways.
| | Burton-upon-Trent Corporation Tramways Order 1903 Order authorising the Mayor Aldermen and Burgesses of the Borough of Burton-upon-Trent to construct additional Tramways in the said Borough. | |
| | Bury Corporation Tramways Order 1903 Order authorising the Mayor Aldermen and Burgesses of the County Borough of Bury to construct additional Tramways in the said Borough and for other purposes. | |
| | Cardiff Corporation Tramways (Extension) Order 1903 Order authorising the Mayor Aldermen and Burgesses of the Borough of Cardiff to construct additional Tramways in the said Borough and for other purposes. | |
| | Huddersfield Corporation Tramways Order 1903 Order authorising the Mayor Aldermen and Burgesses of the County Borough of Huddersfield to construct additional Tramways in the said Borough and for other purposes. | |
| | Leeds Corporation Tramways Order 1903 Order authorising the Lord Mayor Aldermen and Citizens of the City of Leeds to construct additional Tramways in their City. | |
| | Newcastle-upon-Tyne Corporation Tramways Order 1903 Order authorising the Mayor Aldermen and Citizens of the City of Newcastle-upon-Tyne to construct additional Tramways in the said City. | |
| | Portobello and Musselburgh Tramways Order 1903 Order authorising the Pioneer Electric Company Limited (formerly known as the Drake and Gorham Electric Power and Traction (Pioneer) Syndicate Limited) to construct new Tramway in the City Parish of Edinburgh and City and Royal Burgh of Edinburgh and County of the City of Edinburgh to amend the Portobello and Musselburgh Tramways Order 1900 and for other purposes. | |
| Tramways Orders Confirmation (No. 2) Act 1903 | 3 Edw. 7. c. cxlvi | 11 August 1903 |
An Act to confirm certain Provisional Orders made by the Board of Trade under the Tramways Act 1870 relating to Barrow-in-Furness Tramways Horsforth Urban District Council Tramways Keighley Corporation Tramways and Ramsbottom Urban District Council Tramways.
| | Barrow-in-Furness Tramways Order 1903 Order authorising the Construction of a new Tramway and the Electrical Equipment of the existing Tramways in the Borough of Barrow-in-Furness. | |
| | Horsforth Urban District Council Tramways Order 1903 Order authorising the Urban District Council of Horsforth to construct Tramways in their District and for other purposes. | |
| | Keighley Corporation Tramways Order 1903 Order authorising the Mayor Aldermen and Burgesses of the Borough of Keighley to construct Tramways in their Borough. | |
| | Ramsbottom Urban District Council Tramways Order 1903 Order authorising the Urban District Council of Ramsbottom to construct Tramways in the Urban District of Ramsbottom and for other purposes. | |
| Irvine and District Water Board Order Confirmation Act 1903 (repealed) | 3 Edw. 7. c. cxlvii | 11 August 1903 |
An Act to confirm a Provisional Order under the Private Legislation Procedure (Scotland) Act 1899 relating to Irvine and District Water Board. (Repealed by Irvine and District Water Board Order 1961 (SI 1961/872))
| | Irvine and District Water Board Order 1903 Provisional Order to constitute and incorporate a Water Board for the burgh of Irvine and districts adjacent thereto in the county of Ayr to transfer to and vest in such Board the water undertaking of the Corporation of Irvine and for other purposes. | |
| Rothesay Corporation Order Confirmation Act 1903 | 3 Edw. 7. c. cxlviii | 11 August 1903 |
An Act to confirm a Provisional Order under the Private Legislation Procedure (Scotland) Act 1899 relating to the Royal Burgh of Rothesay.
| | Rothesay Corporation Order 1903 Provisional Order to make further provision for the improvement and good government of the Royal Burgh of Rothesay. | |
| Scottish Episcopal Clergy Widows' and Orphans' Fund Order Confirmation Act 1903 (repealed) | 3 Edw. 7. c. cxlix | 11 August 1903 |
An Act to confirm a Provisional Order under the Private Legislation Procedure (Scotland) Act 1899 relating to the Scottish Episcopal Clergy Widows' and Orphans' Fund. (Repealed by Statute Law (Repeals) Act 1998 (c. 43))
| | Scottish Episcopal Clergy Widows' and Orphans' Fund Order 1903 Provisional Order to establish a Fund for providing Annuities for the Widows and Orphan Children of the Bishops and Clergy of the Episcopal Church in Scotland and for other purposes. | |
| Education Board Provisional Order Confirmation (London) Act 1903 | 3 Edw. 7. c. cl | 11 August 1903 |
An Act to confirm a Provisional Order made by the Board of Education under the Education Acts 1870 to 1902 to enable the School Board for London to put in force the Lands Clauses Acts.
| | School Board (London) Order 1903 Provisional Order for putting in force the Lands Clauses Acts. | |
| Gas and Water Orders Confirmation Act 1903 | 3 Edw. 7. c. cli | 11 August 1903 |
An Act to confirm certain Provisional Orders made by the Board of Trade under the Gas and Water Works Facilities Act 1870 relating to Aldershot Gas and Water Amersham Beaconsfield and District Water St. David’s Water and Gas St. Neot's Water and Wexford Gas.
| | Aldershot Gas and Water Order 1903 Order empowering the Aldershot Gas and Water Company to raise additional capital to extend their existing Gasworks and for other purposes. | |
| | Amersham, Beaconsfield and District Water Order 1903 Order empowering the Amersham Beaconsfield and District Waterworks Company Limited to extend their limits of supply to and construct and maintain additional waterworks and to raise additional capital. | |
| | St. David's Water and Gas Order 1903 Order empowering the St. David's Water and Gas Company to raise additional capital for the purposes of their water and gas undertakings and for other purposes. | |
| | St. Neot's Water and Gas Order 1903 Order empowering the St. Neot's Water Company to raise additional Capital. | |
| | Wexford Gas Order 1903 Order empowering the Wexford Gas Consumers Company (Limited) to maintain and continue Gasworks and to manufacture and supply Gas in the Borough of Wexford in the County of Wexford and for other purposes. | |
| Glasgow Corporation (Police) Order Confirmation Act 1903 (repealed) | 3 Edw. 7. c. clii | 11 August 1903 |
An Act to confirm a Provisional Order under the Private Legislation Procedure (Scotland) Act 1899 relating to Glasgow Corporation (Police). (Repealed by Statute Law (Repeals) Act 1995 (c. 44))
| | Glasgow Corporation (Police) Order 1903 Provisional Order to authorise the Corporation of the city of Glasgow to construct a deviation of an authorised sewer to abandon certain authorised sewers to vest the bridge over the River Kelvin at Woodlands Road in the Corporation and for other purposes. | |
| Lanarkshire Tramways Order Confirmation Act 1903 | 3 Edw. 7. c. cliii | 11 August 1903 |
An Act to confirm a Provisional Order under the Private Legislation Procedure (Scotland) Act 1899 relating to the Lanarkshire Tramways.
| | Lanarkshire Tramways Order 1903 Provisional Order for conferring further powers upon the Hamilton Motherwell and Wishaw Tramways Company with respect to the construction of tramways for changing the name of the Company and for other purposes. | |
| Wick and Pulteney Harbours Order Confirmation Act 1903 | 3 Edw. 7. c. cliv | 11 August 1903 |
An Act to confirm a Provisional Order under the Private Legislation Procedure (Scotland) Act 1899 relating to Wick and Pulteney Harbours.
| | Wick and Pulteney Harbours Order 1903 Provisional Order to authorise the Wick and Pulteney Harbours Trustees to construct additional works to amend the Wick and Pulteney Harbours Acts 1879 to 1899 to confer borrowing powers and for other purposes. | |
| Addenbrooke's Hospital Scheme Confirmation Act 1903 (repealed) | 3 Edw. 7. c. clv | 11 August 1903 |
An Act to confirm a scheme of the Charity Commissioners for the management of the charity called Addenbrooke's Hospital in the town of Cambridge in the county of Cambridge regulated by the Act of the seventh year of George the Third chapter ninety-nine. (Note: Addenbrooke's Hospital Act 1767 (7 Geo. 3. c. 99)) (Repealed by Statute Law (Repeals) Act 2013 (c. 2))
| | Scheme for the Management of Addenbrooke's Hospital. | |
| Post Office (Sites) Act 1903 (repealed) | 3 Edw. 7. c. clvi | 11 August 1903 |
An Act to enable His Majesty's Postmaster-General to acquire lands in London and Bristol for the public service and for other purposes. (Repealed by Postal Services Act 2000 (Consequential Modifications to Local Enactments) Order 2003 (SI 2003/1542))
| Scottish American Mortgage Company Limited Act 1903 (repealed) | 3 Edw. 7. c. clvii | 11 August 1903 |
An Act to enable the Scottish American Mortgage Company Limited to create preference stock to enlarge its powers and for other purposes. (Repealed by Statute Law (Repeals) Act 2004 (c. 14))
| South Lancashire Tramways Act 1903 (repealed) | 3 Edw. 7. c. clviii | 11 August 1903 |
An Act to authorise the South Lancashire Tramways Company to construct additional tramways and other works and to extend the time for taking lands and for the construction and completion of certain authorised tramways and widenings and for other purposes. (Repealed by South Lancashire Transport Act 1958 (6 & 7 Eliz. 2. c. xxxiii))
| Didcot, Newbury and Southampton Railway Act 1903 | 3 Edw. 7. c. clix | 11 August 1903 |
An Act to confer further powers on the Didcot Newbury and Southampton Railway Company.
| Great Southern and Western Railway Act 1903 | 3 Edw. 7. c. clx | 11 August 1903 |
An Act to empower the Great Southern and Western Railway Company to construct certain new railways to acquire additional lands to enlarge and improve their station at Waterford to confer further powers upon the Company to enable them to raise additional capital and for other purposes.
| St. Philip (Regent Street) Chapel Act 1903 | 3 Edw. 7. c. clxi | 11 August 1903 |
An Act to provide for the sale and disposal of Saint Philip's Chapel (Regent Street) and for other purposes.
| Baker Street and Waterloo Railway Act 1903 | 3 Edw. 7. c. clxii | 11 August 1903 |
An Act to authorise the Baker Street and Waterloo Railway Company to acquire additional lands and for other purposes.
| Midland Great Western Railway of Ireland Act 1903 (repealed) | 3 Edw. 7. c. clxiii | 11 August 1903 |
An Act to enable the Midland Great Western Railway of Ireland Company to construct a railway from Kingscourt to Castleblayney to acquire additional lands and for other purposes. (Repealed by Statute Law (Repeals) Act 2013 (c. 2))
| Walker and Wallsend Union Gas Act 1903 (repealed) | 3 Edw. 7. c. clxiv | 11 August 1903 |
An Act to empower the Walker and Wallsend Union Gas Company to raise additional capital and for other purposes. (Repealed by Newcastle-upon-Tyne and Gateshead Gas Order 1924 (SR&O 1924/1455))
| Blackheath and Greenwich District Electric Light Company's Act 1903 | 3 Edw. 7. c. clxv | 11 August 1903 |
An Act to confirm an agreement for the transfer to the Blackheath and Greenwich District Electric Light Company Limited of the undertaking of the Lewisham and District Electric Supply Company Limited and to confer further powers upon the Blackheath and Greenwich District Electric Light Company Limited and for other purposes.
| Derby Gas Act 1903 | 3 Edw. 7. c. clxvi | 11 August 1903 |
An Act for consolidating the capital of the Derby Gas Light and Coke Company for enabling that Company to raise additional capital and for other purposes.
| Dudley, Stourbridge and District Tramways Act 1903 | 3 Edw. 7. c. clxvii | 11 August 1903 |
An Act for empowering the Dudley Stourbridge and District Electric Traction Company Limited to work their tramways by mechanical or electrical power and for other purposes.
| Christchurch and Bournemouth Tramways Act 1903 (repealed) | 3 Edw. 7. c. clxviii | 11 August 1903 |
An Act to extend the time limited for the completion of and purchase of lands for the works authorised by the Christchurch and Bournemouth Tramways Act 1900 (Note: Christchurch and Bournemouth Tramways Act 1900 (63 & 64 Vict. c. cclxi)) and for other purposes. (Repealed by Bournemouth Borough Council Act 1985 (c. v))
| Tynemouth and District Tramways Act 1903 | 3 Edw. 7. c. clxix | 11 August 1903 |
An Act for authorising the Tynemouth and District Electric Traction Company Limited to use mechanical power upon their tramways and for other purposes.
| Middlesbrough Corporation Act 1903 (repealed) | 3 Edw. 7. c. clxx | 11 August 1903 |
An Act to make farther provision with respect to the health and good government of the county borough of Middlesbrough and the collection of rates within the said borough and for other purposes. (Repealed by Middlesbrough Corporation Act 1933 (23 & 24 Geo. 5. c. lxxxiii))
| Taff Vale Railway Act 1903 | 3 Edw. 7. c. clxxi | 11 August 1903 |
An Act for extending the time for the purchase or certain lands and completion of certain railways by the Taff Vale Railway Company for enabling the Company to work their railways by electrical power and for other purposes.
| Sutton Coldfield Corporation Act 1903 (repealed) | 3 Edw. 7. c. clxxii | 11 August 1903 |
An Act to confer further powers on the Mayor Aldermen and Burgesses of the borough of Sutton Coldfield in regard to their electric light undertaking and to make further provision for the improvement health local government and finance of the borough and for other purposes. (Repealed by West Midlands Act 1980 (c. xi))
| City and South London Railway Act 1903 | 3 Edw. 7. c. clxxiii | 11 August 1903 |
An Act for empowering the City and South London Railway Company to construct an extension of their underground railway to Euston in the county of London and for transferring to that Company the powers of the City and Brixton Railway Company and for other purposes.
| Newcastle-upon-Tyne Electric Supply Company's Act 1903 | 3 Edw. 7. c. clxxiv | 11 August 1903 |
An Act to transfer the electricity undertaking of the Walker and Wallsend Union Gas Company to the Newcastle-upon-Tyne Electric Supply Company Limited and for other purposes.
| Romford and District Tramways Act 1903 | 3 Edw. 7. c. clxxv | 11 August 1903 |
An Act to authorise the Empire Electric Light and Power Company Limited to construct tramways in Romford and the adjoining districts in the county of Essex and for other purposes.
| Wigan Corporation Tramways Act 1903 | 3 Edw. 7. c. clxxvi | 11 August 1903 |
An Act to confer further powers upon the Mayor Aldermen and Burgesses of the borough of Wigan in regard to the construction of tramways and street improvements and for other purposes.
| Woolwich Borough Council Act 1903 | 3 Edw. 7. c. clxxvii | 11 August 1903 |
An Act to authorise the Mayor Aldermen and Councillors of the metropolitan borough of Woolwich to supply electrical energy in bulk to the Urban District Council of Foots Cray to confer further powers upon the said Mayor Aldermen and Councillors and to make further provision with respect to markets in the borough of Woolwich and for other purposes.
| Bournemouth Corporation Tramways Act 1903 (repealed) | 3 Edw. 7. c. clxxviii | 11 August 1903 |
An Act to empower the Mayor Aldermen and Burgesses of the borough of Bournemouth to maintain and use the tramways authorised by the Bournemouth Corporation Tramways Order 1900 and to make provision for the transfer of the undertaking of the Poole and District Electric Traction Company Limited and for other purposes. (Repealed by Bournemouth Borough Council Act 1985 (c. v))
| Alexandra Park and Palace Act 1903 (repealed) | 3 Edw. 7. c. clxxix | 11 August 1903 |
An Act to amend the Alexandra Park and Palace (Public Purposes) Act 1900 (Note: Alexandra Park and Palace (Public Purposes) Act 1900 (63 & 64 Vict. c. cclix)) and to confer powers on the Alexandra Park Trustees to make charges for admission on bank holidays. (Repealed by Alexandra Park and Palace Order 1966 (SI 1966/199))
| Chatham and District Light Railways Act 1903 (repealed) | 3 Edw. 7. c. clxxx | 11 August 1903 |
An Act to authorise the Chatham and District Light Railways Company to construct tramways and tramroads and other works and for other purposes. (Repealed by Chatham and District Traction Act 1955 (4 & 5 Eliz. 2. c. xiv))
| Willesden Urban District Council Act 1903 | 3 Edw. 7. c. clxxxi | 11 August 1903 |
An Act to confer powers on the Urban District Council of Willesden with respect to their electric lighting undertaking and recreation grounds streets buildings sanitary and other matters for the good government of their district and to transfer to them the powers of the Vestry of the parish of Willesden and for other purposes.
| Exeter Corporation Act 1903 | 3 Edw. 7. c. clxxxii | 11 August 1903 |
An Act to authorise the Mayor Aldermen and Citizens of the city of Exeter to construct tramways and street improvements and for other purposes.
| Barry Railway Act 1903 | 3 Edw. 7. c. clxxxiii | 11 August 1903 |
An Act to extend the time for the completion of certain railways by the Barry Railway Company to confirm an agreement between the Company and certain landowners to empower the Company to raise additional capital and for other purposes.
| Dewsbury Batley and Birstal Tramways Act 1903 | 3 Edw. 7. c. clxxxiv | 11 August 1903 |
An Act to authorise the construction of a new tramway in the Urban District of Ravensthorpe and the electrical equipment and reconstruction of tramways in the boroughs of Dewsbury and Batley and the Urban Districts of Gomersal Birkenshaw Soothill Upper and Birstal and for other purposes
| Worthing Corporation Tramways Act 1903 | 3 Edw. 7. c. clxxxv | 11 August 1903 |
An Act to empower the Mayor Aldermen and Burgesses of the borough of Worthing to construct tramways, in and adjacent to the borough and for other purposes.
| Great Northern, Piccadilly and Brompton Railway (Various Powers) Act 1903 | 3 Edw. 7. c. clxxxvi | 11 August 1903 |
An Act to confer further powers on the Great Northern Piccadilly and Brompton Railway Company and for other purposes.
| London County Council (General Powers) Act 1903 | 3 Edw. 7. c. clxxxvii | 11 August 1903 |
An Act to empower the London County Council to purchase lands to extend the time for completion of certain works to empower the Metropolitan Borough Councils of Camberwell and Kensington to execute works and purchase lands to make provision with respect to premises used for receiving horses for slaughter and carcases of dead horses and the removal and disposal of dead horses to make provision with respect to the drainage of Upper Norwood to confer powers upon Metropolitan Borough Councils with respect to street markets and the provision and maintenance of public clocks and for other purposes.
| London, Tilbury and Southend Railway Act 1903 | 3 Edw. 7. c. clxxxviii | 11 August 1903 |
An Act to confer further powers upon the London Tilbury and Southend Railway Company.
| Watford and Edgware Railway Act 1903 | 3 Edw. 7. c. clxxxix | 11 August 1903 |
An Act to incorporate the Watford and Edgware Railway Company and for empowering them to construct a railway from Watford to Edgware and for other purposes.
| Harrow Road and Paddington Tramways Act 1903 | 3 Edw. 7. c. cxc | 11 August 1903 |
An Act to empower the Harrow Road and Paddington Tramways Company to work their tramways by mechanical power to lease their undertaking to the Metropolitan Electric Tramways Limited and for other purposes.
| London United Tramways Act 1903 | 3 Edw. 7. c. cxci | 11 August 1903 |
An Act for conferring further powers on the London United Tramways (1901) Limited for widening and altering roads and acquiring lands in the counties of Middlesex Surrey and London and for other purposes.
| Birmingham Corporation Act 1903 | 3 Edw. 7. c. cxcii | 11 August 1903 |
An Act to empower the Corporation of Birmingham to work tramways and to construct an additional tramway and to confer further powers on them in regard to streets buildings and sewers and the health local government and improvement of the city and for other purposes.
| Manchester Southern Tramways Act 1903 | 3 Edw. 7. c. cxciii | 11 August 1903 |
An Act to incorporate the Manchester Southern Tramways Company and to empower that Company to make and maintain tramways and other works in the county palatine of Lancaster and in the county of Chester and for other purposes.
| Castleblayney, Keady and Armagh Railway Act 1903 | 3 Edw. 7. c. cxciv | 11 August 1903 |
An Act to extend the time limited by the Kingscourt, Keady and Armagh Railway Act 1900 (Note: Kingscourt, Keady and Armagh Railway Act 1900 (63 & 64 Vict. c. ccxc)) for the compulsory purchase of lands and for the construction of certain of the railways authorised by that Act and for other purposes.
| Gosport and Fareham Tramways Act 1903 | 3 Edw. 7. c. cxcv | 11 August 1903 |
An Act to authorise the Portsmouth Street Tramways Company to construct new tramways in the urban districts of Gosport and Alverstoke and of Fareham in the county of Southampton to work such new tramways and to adapt the existing tramways of that Company in the urban district of Gosport and Alverstoke for working by electrical or other mechanical power and for other purposes.
| Great Western Railway Act 1903 | 3 Edw. 7. c. cxcvi | 11 August 1903 |
An Act for conferring further powers upon the Great Western Railway Company in respect of their own undertaking and upon that Company and the London and North Western Railway Company and the Midland Railway Company in respect of undertakings in which they are jointly interested for amalgamating the Ely Valley Railway Company with the Great Western Railway Company and for other purposes.
| Lancashire and Yorkshire and London and North Western Railway Companies (Steam Vessels) Act 1903 | 3 Edw. 7. c. cxcvii | 11 August 1903 |
An Act to extend and enlarge the powers of the Lancashire and Yorkshire Railway Company and the London and North Western Railway Company as to steam vessels and for other purposes.
| Neath, Pontardawe and Brynaman Railway Act 1903 | 3 Edw. 7. c. cxcviii | 11 August 1903 |
An Act to confer further powers upon the Neath Pontardawe and Brynaman Railway Company for the construction of railways to authorise the Company to raise additional capital and for other purposes.
| Chard Corporation Gas Act 1903 | 3 Edw. 7. c. cxcix | 11 August 1903 |
An Act to authorise the Mayor Aldermen and Burgesses of the borough of Chard to purchase the undertaking of the Chard Gas Company and to supply gas within their borough and the neighbourhood thereof and for other purposes.
| Rochester Corporation Tramways and Improvements Act 1903 | 3 Edw. 7. c. cc | 11 August 1903 |
An Act to authorise the Mayor Aldermen and Citizens of the City of Rochester to construct tramways and street improvements and for other purposes.
| Kip's Patents Act 1903 | 3 Edw. 7. c. cci | 11 August 1903 |
An Act for rendering valid certain letters patent granted to William Phillips Thompson in respect of inventions communicated to him from abroad by Frederic Ellsworth Kip (1) for improvements in stop motions for looms warping machines and the like and (2) for improvements in electrical stop-motions for warps.
| Nottinghamshire and Derbyshire Tramways Act 1903 | 3 Edw. 7. c. ccii | 11 August 1903 |
An Act to incorporate the Nottinghamshire and Derbyshire Tramways Company and to empower that Company to make and maintain tramways and other works in the counties of Nottingham and Derby and for other purposes.
| West Bromwich Corporation Act 1903 (repealed) | 3 Edw. 7. c. cciii | 11 August 1903 |
An Act to repeal section 17 of the West Bromwich Corporation Act 1900 (Note: West Bromwich Corporation Act 1900 (63 & 64 Vict. c. ccxlv)) and section 4 of the West Bromwich Improvement Amendment Act 1865 (Note: Bromwich Improvement Amendment Act 1865 (28 & 29 Vict. c. clx)) and to enact other provisions in lieu thereof and for other purposes. (Repealed by West Bromwich Corporation Act 1969 (c. lix))
| Hove, Worthing and District Tramways Act 1903 | 3 Edw. 7. c. cciv | 11 August 1903 |
An Act to authorise the British Electric Traction Company Limited to construct new tramways between Worthing and Shoreham to work such new tramways and to adapt the existing tramways between Shoreham and Hove for working by electrical or other mechanical power and for other purposes.
| South Eastern and London, Chatham and Dover Railways Act 1903 | 3 Edw. 7. c. ccv | 11 August 1903 |
An Act to enable the South Eastern and Chatham' Railway Companies Managing Committee to work the South Eastern and London Chatham and Dover Railways by electrical power and for other purposes.
| Scottish Ontario and Manitoba Land Company Act 1903 | 3 Edw. 7. c. ccvi | 11 August 1903 |
An Act to confer power on the Scottish Ontario and Manitoba Land Company Limited for the repayment and reduction of their capital and for other purposes.
| Bath Corporation Act 1903 | 3 Edw. 7. c. ccvii | 11 August 1903 |
An Act to empower the Corporation of Bath to construct additional waterworks and for other purposes.
| Dublin, Wicklow and Wexford Railway Act 1903 | 3 Edw. 7. c. ccviii | 11 August 1903 |
An Act to make provision in respect of the lease of the undertaking of the Dublin and Kingstown Railway Company to the Dublin Wicklow and Wexford Railway Company to enable the Dublin Wicklow and Wexford Railway Company to make certain diversion railways and other works to raise additional money and for other purposes.
| Bournemouth Gas and Water Act 1903 | 3 Edw. 7. c. ccix | 11 August 1903 |
An Act to authorise the Bournemouth Gas and Water Company to acquire additional lands to construct works and for other purposes.
| Carmarthenshire Electric Power Company Act 1903 (repealed) | 3 Edw. 7. c. ccx | 11 August 1903 |
An Act for incorporating and conferring powers on the Carmarthenshire Electric Power Company. (Repealed by South Wales Electrical Power Distribution Company Act 1908 (8 Edw. 7. c. lxxi))
| Bristol Corporation Act 1903 | 3 Edw. 7. c. ccxi | 11 August 1903 |
An Act to empower the Lord Mayor Aldermen and Burgesses of the City of Bristol to construct additional dock railways and works and for other purposes.
| Maryport Harbour Act 1903 (repealed) | 3 Edw. 7. c. ccxii | 11 August 1903 |
An Act to incorporate a Company and authorise them to acquire the undertaking of the Commissioners for the harbour of Maryport and to construct a dock railways and works at and near Maryport and for other purposes. (Repealed by Maryport Harbour Revision Order 2007 (SI 2007/3463))
| Manchester Corporation Act 1903 | 3 Edw. 7. c. ccxiii | 11 August 1903 |
An Act to confer further powers upon the Lord Mayor Aldermen and Citizens of the city of Manchester with reference to tramways and streets and otherwise for the better local government and improvement of the city to extend the city and to make provision with reference to the Manchester Royal Infirmary and the borrowing powers of the Corporation and for other purposes.
| Somerset and District Electric Power Act 1903 | 3 Edw. 7. c. ccxiv | 11 August 1903 |
An Act for incorporating and conferring powers on the Somerset and District Electric Power Company.
| Birmingham District Tramways Act 1903 | 3 Edw. 7. c. ccxv | 11 August 1903 |
An Act to enable the City of Birmingham Tramways Company Limited to construct additional tramways and for other purposes.
| Baker Street and Waterloo Railway (Extension of Time) Act 1903 | 3 Edw. 7. c. ccxvi | 11 August 1903 |
An Act to extend the time limited by the Baker Street and Waterloo Railway Act 1900 (Note: Baker Street and Waterloo Railway Act 1900 (63 & 64 Vict. c. ccxxv)) for the compulsory purchase of lands and for the construction of certain of the railways Authorised by that Act and for other purposes.
| Beckenham Urban District Council Act 1903 | 3 Edw. 7. c. ccxvii | 11 August 1903 |
An Act to authorise the Urban District Council of Beckenham in the county of Kent to carry out street improvements to construct and work tramways and to make further provision in regard to the electricity undertaking of the council and for the improvement health local government and finance of the district and for other purposes.
| London County Council (Money) Act 1903 (repealed) | 3 Edw. 7. c. ccxviii | 11 August 1903 |
An Act to regulate the expenditure of money by the London County Council on capital account during the current financial period and the raising of money to meet such expenditure. (Repealed by London County Council (Finance Consolidation) Act 1912 (2 & 3 Geo. 5. c. cv))
| London County Council (Tramways and Improvements) Act 1903 | 3 Edw. 7. c. ccxix | 11 August 1903 |
An Act to enable the London County Council to construct and work tramways in the county of London to make street improvements and to acquire and use tends for the purposes of a station or stations for generating electric energy to empower the Council of the metropolitan borough of Woolwich to widen and improve Well Hall Road and for other purposes.
| Mullingar, Kells and Drogheda Railway Act 1903 | 3 Edw. 7. c. ccxx | 11 August 1903 |
An Act to incorporate the Mullingar Kells and Drogheda Railway Company and for making railways and other works in the counties of Westmeath Meath and Louth and to confer subscription and other powers on certain existing railway companies and for other purposes.
| Fife Electrical Power Act 1903 (repealed) | 3 Edw. 7. c. ccxxi | 11 August 1903 |
An Act for incorporating and conferring powers on the Fife Electric Power Company. (Repealed by South of Scotland Electricity Order Confirmation Act 1956 (4 & 5 Eliz. 2. c. xciv))
| South Shields Corporation Act 1903 | 3 Edw. 7. c. ccxxii | 11 August 1903 |
An Act to enable the Mayor Aldermen and Burgesses of the county borough of South Shields to construct tramways in the borough and for other purposes.
| East Ham Improvement Act 1903 | 3 Edw. 7. c. ccxxiii | 11 August 1903 |
An Act to confer further powers upon the Urban District Council for the district of East Ham in the county of Essex.
| Wood Green Urban District Council Act 1903 | 3 Edw. 7. c. ccxxiv | 11 August 1903 |
An Act to enable the Urban District Council of Wood Green to acquire part of Wood Green Common for the purposes of a dust destructor and to make further provision with regard to the electric light undertaking of the Council and for the improvement health and local government of the district and for other purposes.
| Brighton Corporation Act 1903 (repealed) | 3 Edw. 7. c. ccxxv | 11 August 1903 |
An Act to empower the Mayor Aldermen and Burgesses of the county borough of Brighton to construct and work tramways and for other purposes. (Repealed by Brighton Corporation Act 1931 (21 & 22 Geo. 5. c. cix))
| Airdrie and Coatbridge Tramways Order Confirmation Act 1903 (repealed) | 3 Edw. 7. c. ccxxvi | 14 August 1903 |
An Act to confirm a Provisional Order under the Private Legislation Procedure (Scotland) Act 1899 relating to Airdrie and Coatbridge Tramways. (Repealed by Glasgow (Tramways, &c.) Order Confirmation Act 1922 (13 Geo. 5. Sess. 2. c. ii))
| | Airdrie and Coatbridge Tramways Order 1903 Provisional Order to extend the time limited for the completion of the tramways and works authorised by the Airdrie and Coatbridge Tramways Act 1900 (Note: Airdrie and Coatbridge Tramways Act 1900 (63 & 64 Vict. c. xcvii)) and for other purposes. | |
| Lerwick Harbour Improvements Act 1877 Amendment Order Confirmation Act 1903 (repealed) | 3 Edw. 7. c. ccxxvii | 14 August 1903 |
An Act to confirm a Provisional Order under the Private Legislation Procedure (Scotland) Act 1899 relating to Lerwick Harbour. (Repealed by Lerwick Harbour Order Confirmation Act 1952 (15 & 16 Geo. 6 & 1 Eliz. 2. c. liii))
| | Lerwick Harbour Improvements Act 1877 Amendment Order 1903 Provisional Order to amend the Lerwick Harbour Improvements Act 1877 (Note: Lerwick Harbour Improvements Act 1877 (40 & 41 Vict. c. cxciv)) to authorise the Trustees of the Port and Harbour of Lerwick to levy Tonnage and other Rates in place of the Tonnage and other Rates authorised by the said Act to repeal certain Provisions of that Act and for other purposes. | |
| Glasgow Corporation Tramways Order Confirmation Act 1903 | 3 Edw. 7. c. ccxxviii | 14 August 1903 |
An Act to confirm a Provisional Order under the Private Legislation Procedure (Scotland) Act 1899 relating to Glasgow Corporation Tramways.
| | Glasgow Corporation Tramways Order 1903 Provisional Order to authorise the Corporation of the city of Glasgow to construct new tramways and acquire certain tramways to authorise a supplementary valuation roll to raise further moneys and for other purposes. | |
| Auchterarder Town Council Order Confirmation Act 1903 | 3 Edw. 7. c. ccxxix | 14 August 1903 |
An Act to confirm a Provisional Order under the Private Legislation Procedure (Scotland) Act 1899 relating to the burgh of Auchterarder.
| | Auchterarder Town Council Order 1903 Provisional Order to vest in the Provost Magistrates and Councillors of the Burgh of Auchterarder the Rights and Interests of the Auchterarder Water Committee in the Crook of the Moss Water Supply the Common Muir of Auchterarder the Girnal House and Steelyard Trust Properties and the Aytoun Memorial Hall and for other purposes. | |
| Patent Office (Extension) Act 1903 | 3 Edw. 7. c. ccxxx | 14 August 1903 |
An Act for the acquisition of land for the further extension of the Patent Office and for purposes connected therewith.
| South Staffordshire Tramways Act 1903 | 3 Edw. 7. c. ccxxxi | 14 August 1903 |
An Act to confer further powers upon the South Staffordshire Tramways (lessee) Company Limited for the working of tramways by electrical power and for other purposes.
| Liverpool University Act 1903 | 3 Edw. 7. c. ccxxxii | 14 August 1903 |
An Act to separate University College Liverpool from the Victoria University and to merge it in the University of Liverpool and to transfer all the property and liabilities of the said University College to the University of Liverpool and for other purposes.
| Bradford Corporation Act 1903 (repealed) | 3 Edw. 7. c. ccxxxiii | 14 August 1903 |
An Act to confer powers on the Mayor Aldermen and Citizens of the city of Bradford with respect to tramways waterworks and gas supply to enable the Corporation and the Urban District Council of Shipley to exchange portions of their respective gas undertakings and to make further provisions with respect to rating and various matters of local administration and management. (Repealed by West Yorkshire Act 1980 (c. xiv))
| Bury and District Joint Water Board Act 1903 | 3 Edw. 7. c. ccxxxiv | 14 August 1903 |
An Act empower the Bury and District Joint Water Board to construct additional waterworks to repeal and amend enactments relating to the water undertaking of the Board and for other purposes.
| Preston, Chorley and Horwich Tramways Act 1903 | 3 Edw. 7. c. ccxxxv | 14 August 1903 |
An Act to incorporate the Preston Chorley and Horwich Tramways Company and to empower that Company to make and maintain tramways and other works and for other purposes.
| Salford Corporation Act 1903 | 3 Edw. 7. c. ccxxxvi | 14 August 1903 |
An Act to enable the Mayor Aldermen and Burgesses of the borough of Salford to construct an additional tramway and to make street improvements to confirm an agreement with the Lord Mayor Aldermen and Citizens of the city of Manchester to provide for transfer to the Corporation of certain powers of electric lighting and to enable the Corporation to raise additional moneys by mortgage and by the creation and issue of stock and for other purposes.
| Shropshire and Worcestershire Electric Power Act 1903 (repealed) | 3 Edw. 7. c. ccxxxvii | 14 August 1903 |
An Act for incorporating and conferring powers on the Shropshire and Worcestershire Electric Power Company. (Repealed by Shropshire, Worcestershire and Staffordshire Electric Power (Consolidation) Act 1938 (1 & 2 Geo. 6. c. lviii))
| North Western Electricity and Power-Gas Act 1903 | 3 Edw. 7. c. ccxxxviii | 14 August 1903 |
An Act for incorporating and conferring powers on the North Western Electricity and Power-Gas Company and for other purposes.
| Hastings Harbour Act 1903 | 3 Edw. 7. c. ccxxxix | 14 August 1903 |
An Act to define the ranking and priority of the mortgages of the Hastings Harbour Commissioners already issued and to be issued under former Acts for the completion of the harbour works to extend the periods limited for the purchase of lands for and for the completion of such works and for other purposes.
| Hastings Harbour District Railway Act 1903 (repealed) | 3 Edw. 7. c. ccxl | 14 August 1903 |
An Act to authorise the Hastings Harbour District Railway Company to construct deviation railways and new railways to raise additional capital and for other purposes. (Repealed by Hastings Harbour District Railway (Abandonment) Act 1905 (5 Edw. 7. c. xxiv))
| Scottish Central Electric Power Act 1903 (repealed) | 3 Edw. 7. c. ccxli | 14 August 1903 |
An Act for incorporating and conferring powers on the Scottish Central Electric Power Company. (Repealed by South of Scotland Electricity Order Confirmation Act 1956 (4 & 5 Eliz. 2. c. xciv))
| Mid-Yorkshire Tramways Act 1903 | 3 Edw. 7. c. ccxlii | 14 August 1903 |
An Act to incorporate the Mid-Yorkshire Tramways Company and to empower that Company to make and maintain tramways and other works and for other purposes.
| Bangor Corporation Act 1903 | 3 Edw. 7. c. ccxliii | 14 August 1903 |
An Act to empower the Mayor Aldermen and Burgesses of the borough of Bangor to make a gift of a new site for Bangor College to provide recreation grounds to provide weighing machines to acquire the Penrhyn Hall and for other purposes.
| South Western and Isle of Wight Junction Railway Act 1903 | 3 Edw. 7. c. ccxliv | 14 August 1903 |
An Act to empower the South Western and Isle of Wight Junction Railway Company to construct a railway and a pier to raise additional capital to enter into working agreements with the London and South Western Railway Company and for other purposes.
| Ebbw Vale Improvement Act 1903 | 3 Edw. 7. c. ccxlv | 14 August 1903 |
An Act to authorise the Urban District Council of Ebbw Vale to provide additional cemeteries and to make further provision with regard to the supply of electricity and for the improvement health local government and finance of the district and for other purposes.
| Kingston-upon-Hull Corporation Act 1903 | 3 Edw. 7. c. ccxlvi | 14 August 1903 |
An Act to empower the Corporation of Kingston-upon-Hull to make a certain street work and bridge to construct additional tramways and to confer further powers on them in regard to streets buildings and sewers and the health local government and improvement of the city and for other purposes.
| Dover Corporation Act 1903 (repealed) | 3 Edw. 7. c. ccxlvii | 14 August 1903 |
An Act to authorise the Corporation of Dover to borrow money for the purchase of the undertaking of the Dover Electricity Supply Company Limited and for other purposes. (Repealed by County of Kent Act 1981 (c. xviii))
| Western Valleys (Monmouthshire) Sewerage Board Act 1903 | 3 Edw. 7. c. ccxlviii | 14 August 1903 |
An Act to constitute and incorporate a joint board consisting of representatives of the urban district councils of Abercarn Abertillery Ebbw Vale Nantyglo and Blaina and Risca all in the county of Monmouth and to authorise the board to construct main trunk sewers and other works for the disposal of the sewage of such districts and for other purposes.
| Stroud and District Tramways Act 1903 | 3 Edw. 7. c. ccxlix | 14 August 1903 |
An Act to incorporate the Stroud and District Tramways Company and to empower that Company to make and maintain tramways in the county of Gloucester and for other purposes.
| Erith Tramways and Improvement Act 1903 | 3 Edw. 7. c. ccl | 14 August 1903 |
An Act to authorise the Urban District Council of Erith in the county of Kent to construct and work tramways to carry out street improvements and to make further provision in regard to the supply of electricity and for the improvement health local government and finance of the district and for other purposes.
| Great Central Railway Act 1903 | 3 Edw. 7. c. ccli | 14 August 1903 |
An Act to authorise the construction of new railways and the acquisition of lands by the Great Central Railway Company in connection with their undertaking the construction of a new railway by the North Wales and Liverpool Railway Committee or the Company in connection with the undertaking of that Committee the diversion of footpaths by the Great Western and Great Central Railways Joint Committee in connection with their undertaking and for other purposes.
| Gateshead Corporation Act 1903 (repealed) | 3 Edw. 7. c. cclii | 14 August 1903 |
An Act to make better provision for the health good government and improvement of the county borough of Gateshead and for other purposes. (Repealed by Tyne & Wear Act 1980 (c. xliii))
| South Yorkshire Joint Railway Act 1903 | 3 Edw. 7. c. ccliii | 14 August 1903 |
An Act for enabling the North Eastern the Lancashire and Yorkshire the Great Northern the Midland and the Great Central Railway Companies to construct or take over certain railways in South Yorkshire authorised by the Shireoaks Laughton and Maltby Railway Act 1901 (Note: Shireoaks Laughton and Maltby Railway Act 1901 (1 Edw. 7. c. ccxxx)) and the North Eastern Railway Act 1902 (Note: North Eastern Railway Act 1902 (2 Edw. 7. c. clxviii)) and to construct other railways and works for constituting a joint committee and for other purposes
| North Eastern Railway Act 1903 | 3 Edw. 7. c. ccliv | 14 August 1903 |
An Act to confer additional powers upon the North Eastern Railway Company for the construction of new railways and other works and the acquisition of lands and for other purposes.
| Sheffield Corporation Act 1903 (repealed) | 3 Edw. 7. c. cclv | 14 August 1903 |
An Act to confer further powers on the Lord Mayor Aldermen and Citizens of the City of Sheffield with respect to their water undertaking and their electrical undertaking to authorise the execution of various street widenings and other works in the city to consolidate into one township certain townships in the city to make further and better provision for the improvement health and good government of the city and for other purposes. (Repealed by Sheffield Corporation (Consolidation) Act 1918 (8 & 9 Geo. 5. c. lxi))
| Cork Harbour Act 1903 | 3 Edw. 7. c. cclvi | 14 August 1903 |
An Act to amend the Acts relating to the Cork Harbour Commissioners to confer further powers on the Commissioners and for other purposes.
| Hainault (Lambourne, Fox Burrows and Grange Hill) Act 1903 | 3 Edw. 7. c. cclvii | 14 August 1903 |
An Act to authorise the acquisition of lands known as Lambourne Common Chigwell Common Fox Burrows Farm Grange Hill Forest and other lands in the county of Essex for the purposes of public open spaces.
| Seaforth and Sefton Junction Railway Act 1903 | 3 Edw. 7. c. cclviii | 14 August 1903 |
An Act for making railways in the county of Lancaster for connecting the Southport and Cheshire Lines Extension Railway with the Liverpool Overhead Railway and for other purposes.
| Coventry Electric Tramways Act 1903 | 3 Edw. 7. c. cclix | 14 August 1903 |
An Act to authorise the Coventry Electric Tramways Company to construct additional tramways and for other purposes.
| Strabane, Raphoe and Convoy Railway Act 1903 | 3 Edw. 7. c. cclx | 14 August 1903 |
An Act to authorise the construction of a railway in the counties of Tyrone and Donegal between Strabane and Convoy and for other purpose
| Croydon and District Electric Tramways (Extensions) Act 1903 | 3 Edw. 7. c. cclxi | 14 August 1903 |
An Act to authorise the British Electric Traction Company Limited to construct further tramways in the counties of Surrey and Kent and for other purposes.
| Ulster and Connaught Light Railways Act 1903 | 3 Edw. 7. c. cclxii | 14 August 1903 |
An Act to change the name of the Newry Keady and Tynnn Light Railway Company to extend the time for the compulsory purchase of lances for and for the completion of the railways authorised by the Newry Keady and Tynan Light Railway Act 1900 (Note: Newry Keady and Tynan Light Railway Act 1900 (63 & 64 Vict. c. cclxxv)) and for other purposes
| North Metropolitan Electric Power Supply Act 1903 (repealed) | 3 Edw. 7. c. cclxiii | 14 August 1903 |
An Act to empower the Urban District Council of Willesden to sell their generating station at Willesden to the North Metropolitan Electric Power Supply Company to confer further powers upon that Company and for other purposes. (Repealed by North Metropolitan Electric Power Supply (Consolidation) Act 1928 (18 & 19 Geo. 5. c. cxviii))

=== Private and personal acts ===
| Short title | Citation | Royal assent |
Long title
| Lochnell Estate Act 1903 | 3 Edw. 7. c. 1 Pr. | 11 August 1903 |
An Act to vest the estate of Lochnell in the county of Argyll in Trustees for certain purposes with power of sale and other powers.
| Pentillie Estate Act 1903 | 3 Edw. 7. c. 2 Pr. | 11 August 1903 |
An Act to enable money to be raised or secured upon the Pentillie Estate in the county of Cornwall devised by the Will of Augustus Coryton Esquire deceased.

=== Sources ===
- Volume 41 - 3 Edward VII - 1903 – via Internet Archive.

== See also ==
- List of acts of the Parliament of the United Kingdom
