= Lanarkshire Tramways =

Inter-city tramway from Hamilton to Wishaw (1903-1931)

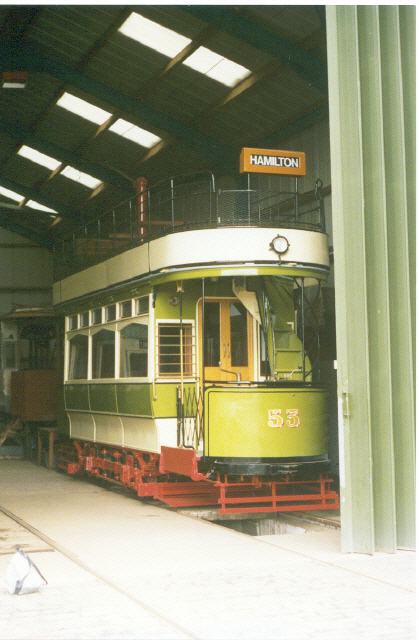
- Lanarkshire Tramways No 53 preserved at Summerlee, Museum of Scottish Industrial Life

Operation
- Locale: Hamilton, Motherwell, Wishaw
- Open: 22 July 1903
- Close: 14 February 1931
- Status: Closed

Infrastructure
- Track gauge: 4 ft 7 3/4 in (1,416 mm)
- Propulsion system: Electric

Statistics
- Route length: 28.43 miles (45.75 km)

The Lanarkshire Tramways was a tramway between Hamilton, Motherwell, and Wishaw from 1903 to 1931.

== History ==
Hamilton, Motherwell and Wishaw Tramways Act 1900
- Act of Parliament
- Parliament of the United Kingdom
- Long title: An Act for incorporating and conferring powers on the Hamilton Motherwell and Wishaw Tramways Company and for other purposes.
- Citation: 63 & 64 Vict. c. cxxi

Dates
- Royal assent: 30 July 1900

Text of statute as originally enacted

Lanarkshire Tramways Order Confirmation Act 1903
- Act of Parliament
- Parliament of the United Kingdom
- Long title: An Act to confirm a Provisional Order under the Private Legislation Procedure (Scotland) Act 1899 relating to the Lanarkshire Tramways.
- Citation: 3 Edw. 7. c. cliii

Dates
- Royal assent: 11 August 1903

Other legislation
- Relates to: Private Legislation Procedure (Scotland) Act 1899

Text of statute as originally enacted

The tramway was authorised by the Hamilton, Motherwell and Wishaw Tramways Act 1900 (63 & 64 Vict. c. cxxi). Services started on 22 July 1903, the company taking the shorter name 'Lanarkshire Tramways' by the Lanarkshire Tramways Order Confirmation Act 1903 (3 Edw. 7. c. cliii).

Lanarkshire Tramways Order Confirmation Act 1908
- Act of Parliament
- Parliament of the United Kingdom
- Long title: An Act to confirm a Provisional Order under the Private Legislation Procedure (Scotland) Act 1899 relating to Lanarkshire Tramways.
- Citation: 8 Edw. 7. c. cxviii

Dates
- Royal assent: 1 August 1908

Other legislation
- Relates to: Private Legislation Procedure (Scotland) Act 1899

Lanarkshire Tramways Order Confirmation Act 1920
- Act of Parliament
- Parliament of the United Kingdom
- Long title: An Act to confirm a Provisional Order under the Private Legislation Procedure (Scotland) Act, 1899, relating to Lanarkshire Tramways.
- Citation: 10 & 11 Geo. 5. c. clxxi
- Territorial extent: United Kingdom

Dates
- Royal assent: 23 December 1920

Other legislation
- Amended by: Statute Law (Repeals) Act 1993
- Relates to: Private Legislation Procedure (Scotland) Act 1899

Status: Amended

An extension was opened on 20 January 1907 which provided a connection with Glasgow Corporation Tramways.

== Closure ==
Lanarkshire Traction Order Confirmation Act 1929
- Act of Parliament
- Parliament of the United Kingdom
- Long title: An Act to confirm a Provisional Order under the Private Legislation Procedure (Scotland) Act 1899 relating to Lanarkshire Traction.
- Citation: 20 & 21 Geo. 5. c. xxxiv

Dates
- Royal assent: 20 December 1929

Other legislation
- Relates to: Private Legislation Procedure (Scotland) Act 1899

Text of statute as originally enacted

The tramway ceased operation on 14 February 1931, the company having changed its name the previous year to the Lanarkshire Traction Company by the Lanarkshire Traction Order Confirmation Act 1929 (20 & 21 Geo. 5. c. xxxiv).

One tram survived into preservation, No 53, and is currently at the Summerlee, Museum of Scottish Industrial Life.
