= Airdrie and Coatbridge Tramways =

Tramway operator in Scotland

Operation
- Locale: Airdrie, Coatbridge
- Open: 8 February 1904
- Close: 1 January 1922
- Status: Closed

Infrastructure
- Track gauge: 4 ft 7 3/4 in (1,416 mm)
- Propulsion system: Electric
- Depot: Main Street

Statistics
- Route length: 3.63 miles (5.84 km)

Airdrie and Coatbridge Tramways operated a tramway service in Airdrie and Coatbridge between 1904 and 1922 when it was taken over by Glasgow Corporation Tramways.

== History ==
British Electric Traction established the Airdrie and Coatbridge Tramways Company to operate this single line tramway between Airdrie and Coatbridge.

Some buses were acquired by the company in October 1911 to run complementary services.

== Fleet ==
- 1-12 Brush Electrical Engineering Company 1904
- 13-15 Brush Electrical Engineering Company 1905

== Closure ==
The tramway was purchased for £77,550 (equivalent to £2,996,812 in 2025) by Airdrie and Coatbridge Corporations and a connection was made on 30 December 1920 with the Glasgow Corporation Tramways between Coatbridge and Bailleston.

The tramway was acquired by Glasgow Corporation Tramways on 1 January 1922 for the sum of £82,250(equivalent to £4,040,927 in 2025).
