= Skipwith Common =

Nature reserve in North Yorkshire, England

Skipwith Common National nature reserve/SSSI/SAC
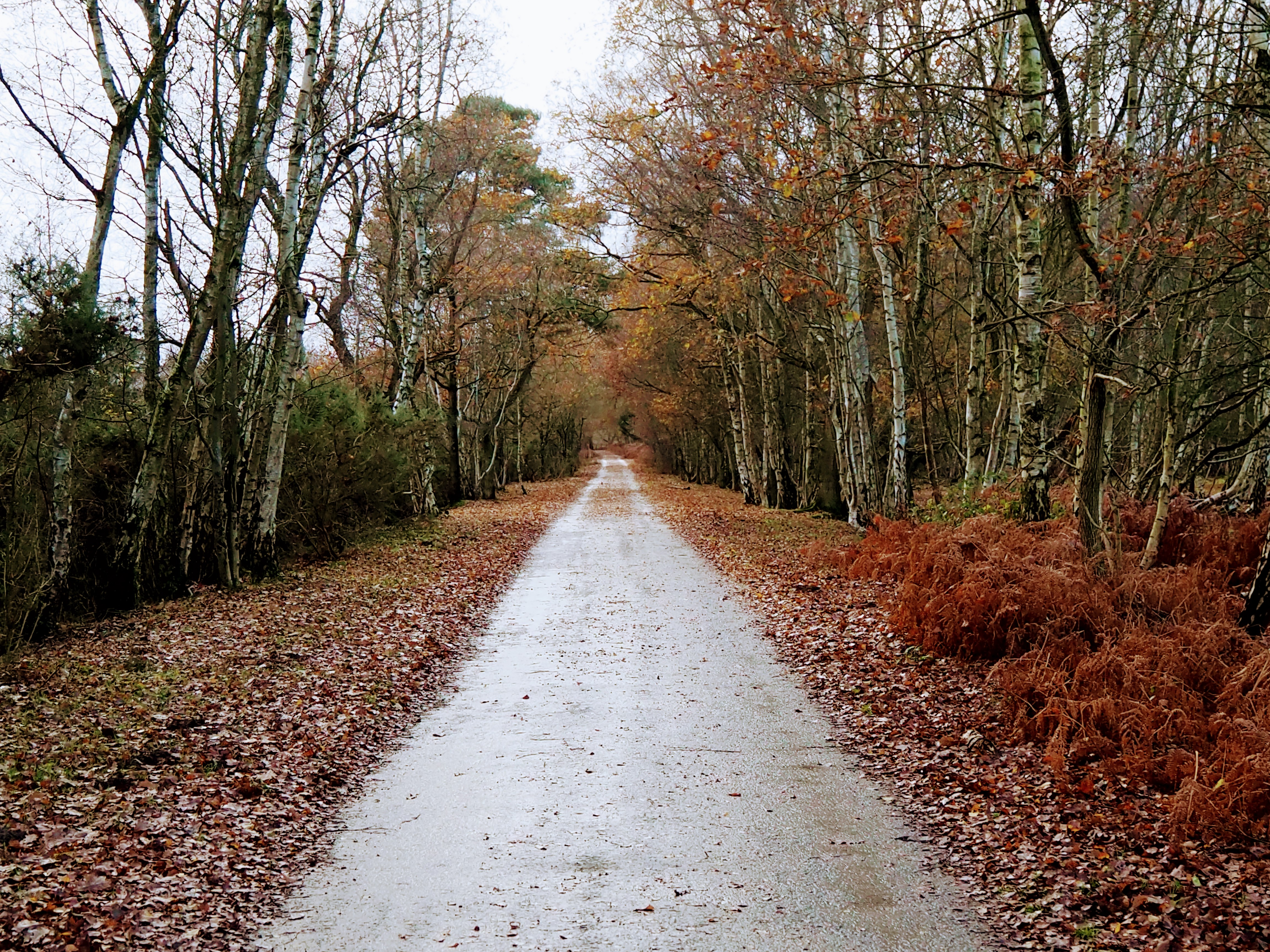
- Path on Skipwith Common

- Location within North Yorkshire
- Location: Skipwith, North Yorkshire
- Nearest town: Selby
- OS grid: SE668362
- Coordinates: 53.8277°N 0.9975°W
- Area: 680 acres (274 hectares)
- Elevation: 30 feet (9 m)
- Designated: SSSI - 1958; SAC - 2004; NNR - 2010
- Manager: Escrick Park Estate; Natural England
- Hiking trails: 3
- Designation: National nature reserve Special area of conservation SSSI

Skipwith Common is a national nature reserve south of Skipwith, North Yorkshire, England. It is one of only three areas within the Vale of York that represent what the area was like before intensive agriculture took over. Natural England have described the reserve as having "international importance" on account of "its wet and dry heathland".

The site used to be common land, and has seen use in the Bronze Age, during the Early modern European period, when it was harvested for peat, and during the 20th century when it was partly incorporated into an airfield during the Second World War.

The site was given the designation of SSSI in 1958, SAC in 2004 and NNR in 2010.

== History ==
In the 18th century, Skipwith Common covered an area of 869 acres (352 ha) and curved eastwards around the village. The modern-day site, which covers 580 acres (234 hectares), was formerly part of RAF Riccall, and is 30 feet (9 m) above sea level, sandwiched between the Rivers Ouse and Derwent, forming part of the watershed between the two. It can be defined into two distinct areas; lowland heath and woodland. Part of the site is labelled as Danes Hill and was thought to have been where the Viking army buried their dead after their defeat at the Battle of Stamford Bridge. Also on the common is a Bronze Age barrow, some 2,600 feet (800 m) south of Skipwith.

Regulation and Inclosure (Skipwith) Provisional Orders Act 1901
- Act of Parliament
- Parliament of the United Kingdom
- Long title: An Act to confirm a Provisional Order under the Inclosure Acts 1845 to 1882 for the Regulation of Skipwith Common in the parish of Skipwith in the county of York and a Provisional Order under the said Acts for the inclosure of the common fields in the same parish.
- Citation: 1 Edw. 7. c. xlv

Dates
- Royal assent: 2 July 1901

Text of statute as originally enacted

The numerous ponds on the site are from the flax industry which flourished in the area around the 19th century. The working of flax required large ponds on even ground with a plentiful supply of freshwater streams to feed the ponds. The process for working flax is known as retting, and is normally located away from settlements due to the poisoning of the water supply. The site was also used to harvest peat for fuel throughout the 16th, 17th and 18th centuries, with York being a popular market for the peat. In 1903, the common was enclosed under the Regulation and Inclosure (Skipwith) Provisional Orders Act 1901 (1 Edw. 7. c. xlv), being the last major piece of common land in England to undergo this transformation.

In the 1940s, the south-western edge of the common was utilised by the Royal Air Force as the bomb storage location for the adjacent RAF Riccall airfield. After the Air Force departed in 1957, the site was rarely used and was subject to being overgrown with Betula (birch trees) as the common was not being actively managed. Sheep were introduced in 1983, which proved beneficial for keeping the scrub in check, but they were heavy-footed and so were replaced in 1986 with the Hebridean breed, which weigh a lot less than the Swaledale and Dalesbred breeds that were being used previously. The site is also grazed by English Longhorn cattle and Exmoor ponies.

The site was designated as a Site of Special Scientific Interest in 1958, because of its rich vegetation and are entomological species such as orgyia recens and chilodes maritima. The designation extends to 724 acres (293 ha), which is slightly more than the NNR designation. In 2004, the site was confirmed as a Special Area of Conservation.

As part of the Selby Coalfield mining venture, the coal underneath the common was mined from 1997 onwards. Whilst there were some objections to this, RJB Mining countered that working the Stanley Main Seam was necessary as poor geological conditions in the Barnsley Seam led to the seeking alternatives.

Skipwith Common is representative of what a lowland heath would have looked like before the Vale of York was subject to intensive agriculture. A spokesperson for Natural England described the site as having "international importance for its wet and dry heathland." Skipwith Common is one of just three sites within the vale that are indicative of this lowland heath, the other two being Strensall Common and Allerthorpe Common. The common has a memorial to remember those who served at the RAF base during the Second World War.

Buses run through the village of Skipwith, and the nearest railway stations are at Wressle and Selby. The site is bounded on the west by the A19 road and to the south by the A163 road. Both provide access roads into the common with car parks on the common's edges.

== Geology ==
The common lies on sands of the Breighton Sand Formation with peat on the surface. The underlying sand is thought to have been deposited during a glacial period when sediment was left here due to retreating ice and the flow of water over the Vale of York. The coal seam is 900 feet (270 m) below the surface and was the subject of test borings in 1909 when the Derwent Valley Light Railway built their line to the east of Skipwith Common.

== Trails ==
Skipwith Common has quite a wide area, and off the main paths, it is easy to get lost and trample the undergrowth, thereby disturbing wildlife, so three trails have been developed:

- Bombs and Lizards - the shortest of the three at the western end of the common which takes the walker past the remnants of RAF Riccall's bomb dump, now home to a variety of reptiles
- Hidden Archaeology - explores the history of the site
- Skipwith Explorer - Takes in most of the other two trails with a diversion into the village of Skipwith itself

== Description ==
According to the JNCC (Joint Nature Conservation Committee), the site can be broken down as follows:

- 55% - Heath, Scrub, Maquis and Garrigue, Phygrana
- 27% - Broad-leaved deciduous woodland
- 5% - Bogs, Marshes, Water fringed vegetation, Fens
- 5% - Dry grassland, Steppes
- 5% - Inland water bodies (Standing water, Running water)
- 3% - Mixed woodland

== Species list ==
- Broadleaved hellebore
- Common twayblade
- Common spotted orchid
- Emperor moth
- Great crested newts
- Nightjar
- Pond mud snail
- Pirri-pirri bur, an invasive Australasian plant, said to arrived on the common thanks to Antipodean airmen who served at RAF Riccall during the Second World War.
- Round-leaved sundew
- Woodlark
- Water vole

Skipwith Common was one of the last places in Britain to have the Northern Mire Moss paludella squarrosa as part of its vegetation (1916), though the plant is believed to be extinct in Britain now.
