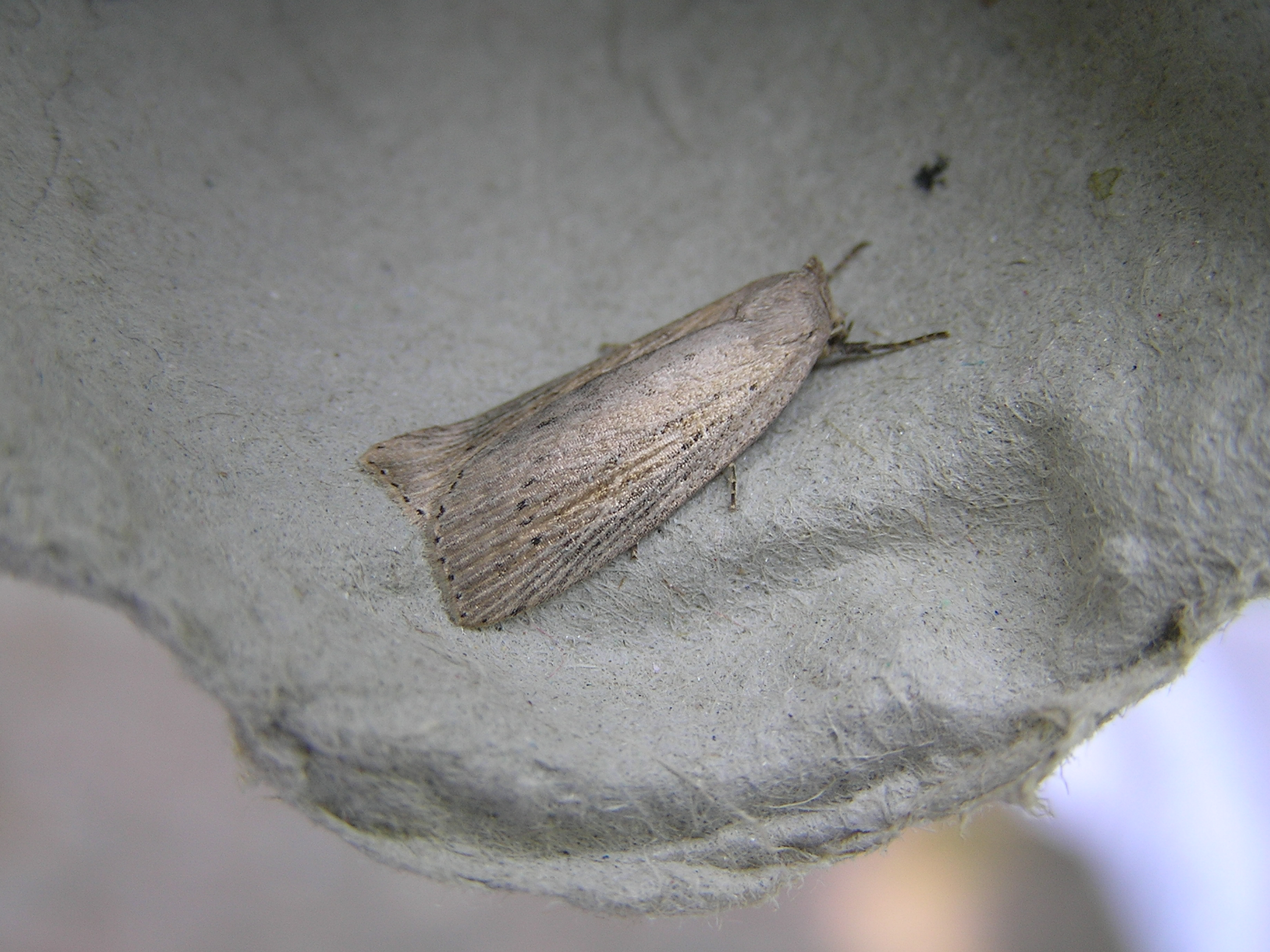
- Chilodes maritimus

Scientific classification
- Kingdom: Animalia
- Phylum: Arthropoda
- Class: Insecta
- Order: Lepidoptera
- Superfamily: Noctuoidea
- Family: Noctuidae
- Tribe: Caradrinini
- Genus: Chilodes; Herrich-Schäffer, 1849

= Chilodes =

Genus of moths

Chilodes is a genus of moths of the family Noctuidae.

== Species ==
- Chilodes distracta (Eversmann, 1848)
- Chilodes dubiosa (Draudt, 1950)
- Chilodes maritimus – silky wainscot (Tauscher, 1806)
- Chilodes nigrosignata (Graeser, [1889])
- Chilodes pacifica Sugi, 1982
