= List of acts of the Parliament of the United Kingdom from 1901 =

This is a complete list of acts of the Parliament of the United Kingdom for the year 1901.

Note that the first parliament of the United Kingdom was held in 1801; parliaments between 1707 and 1800 were either parliaments of Great Britain or of Ireland). For acts passed up until 1707, see the list of acts of the Parliament of England and the list of acts of the Parliament of Scotland. For acts passed from 1707 to 1800, see the list of acts of the Parliament of Great Britain. See also the list of acts of the Parliament of Ireland.

For acts of the devolved parliaments and assemblies in the United Kingdom, see the list of acts of the Scottish Parliament, the list of acts of the Northern Ireland Assembly, and the list of acts and measures of Senedd Cymru; see also the list of acts of the Parliament of Northern Ireland.

The number shown after each act's title is its chapter number. Acts passed before 1963 are cited using this number, preceded by the year(s) of the reign during which the relevant parliamentary session was held; thus the Union with Ireland Act 1800 is cited as "39 & 40 Geo. 3 c. 67", meaning the 67th act passed during the session that started in the 39th year of the reign of George III and which finished in the 40th year of that reign. Note that the modern convention is to use Arabic numerals in citations (thus "41 Geo. 3" rather than "41 Geo. III"). Acts of the last session of the Parliament of Great Britain and the first session of the Parliament of the United Kingdom are both cited as "41 Geo. 3". Acts passed from 1963 onwards are simply cited by calendar year and chapter number.

== 1 Edw. 7 ==
The second session of the 27th Parliament of the United Kingdom, which met from 23 January 1901 until 17 August 1901.

No private acts were passed during this session.

This session was also traditionally cited as 1 Ed. 7 or 1 E. 7.

=== Public general acts ===
Short title	Citation	Royal assent
Long title
Consolidated Fund Act (No. 1) 1901 (Note: This was the first public act of the reign of King Edward VII.) (repealed)	1 Edw. 7. c. 1	29 March 1901
An Act to apply certain sums out of the Consolidated Fund to the service of the years ending on the thirty-first day of March one thousand nine hundred, one thousand nine hundred and one, and one thousand nine hundred and two. (Repealed by Statute Law Revision Act 1927 (17 & 18 Geo. 5. c. 42))
Army (Annual) Act 1901 (repealed)	1 Edw. 7. c. 2	29 April 1901
An Act to provide, during Twelve Months, for the Discipline and Regulation of the Army. (Repealed by Statute Law Revision Act 1927 (17 & 18 Geo. 5. c. 42) and Revision of the Army and Air Force Acts (Transitional Provisions) Act 1955 (3 & 4 Eliz. 2. c. 20))
Purchase of Land (Ireland) Act 1901 (repealed)	1 Edw. 7. c. 3	2 July 1901
An Act to amend subsection (1) of section nine of the Purchase of Land (Ireland) Act, 1891, (Note: Purchase of Land (Ireland) Act 1891 (54 & 55 Vict. c. 48)) and subsection (2) of section forty-three of the Land Law (Ireland) Act, 1896. (Note: Land Law (Ireland) Act 1896 (59 & 60 Vict. c. 47)) (Repealed by Statute Law Revision Act 1927 (17 & 18 Geo. 5. c. 42) and Statute Law Revision Act 1950 (14 Geo. 6. c. 6))
Civil List Act 1901 (repealed)	1 Edw. 7. c. 4	2 July 1901
An Act to make provision for the honour and dignity of the Crown and the Royal Family, and for the payment of certain allowances and pensions. (Repealed by Statute Law Revision Act 1963 (c. 30))
Demise of the Crown Act 1901	1 Edw. 7. c. 5	2 July 1901
An Act to amend the Law relating to the Holding of Offices in case of the Demise of the Crown.
Consolidated Fund (No. 2) Act 1901 (repealed)	1 Edw. 7. c. 6	2 July 1901
An Act to apply a sum out of the Consolidated Fund to the service of the year ending on the thirty-first day of March one thousand nine hundred and two. (Repealed by Statute Law Revision Act 1927 (17 & 18 Geo. 5. c. 42))
Finance Act 1901	1 Edw. 7. c. 7	26 July 1901
An Act to grant certain duties of Customs and Inland Revenue, to alter other duties, and to amend the Law relating to Customs and Inland Revenue and the National Debt, and to make other provision for the financial arrangements of the year.
Isolation Hospitals Act 1901 (repealed)	1 Edw. 7. c. 8	26 July 1901
An Act to amend the Isolation Hospitals Act, 1893. (Note: Isolation Hospitals Act 1893 (56 & 57 Vict. c. 68)) (Repealed by Public Health Act 1936 (26 Geo. 5 & 1 Edw. 8. c. 49))
Education (Scotland) Act 1901 (repealed)	1 Edw. 7. c. 9	9 August 1901
An Act to regulate the Employment and Attendance of Children at School in Scotland. (Repealed by Education (Scotland) Act 1908 (8 Edw. 7. c. 63), Statute Law Revision Act 1927 (17 & 18 Geo. 5. c. 42), Children and Young Persons (Scotland) Act 1932 (22 & 23 Geo. 5. c. 47) and Education (Scotland) Act 1946 (9 & 10 Geo. 6. c. 72))
Larceny Act 1901 (repealed)	1 Edw. 7. c. 10	9 August 1901
An Act to amend the Larceny Act, 1861. (Note: Larceny Act 1861 (24 & 25 Vict. c. 96)) (Repealed by Larceny Act 1916 (6 & 7 Geo. 5. c. 50))
Education Act 1901 (repealed)	1 Edw. 7. c. 11	9 August 1901
An Act for enabling local authorities to empower School Boards temporarily to carry on certain schools; and for sanctioning certain School Board expenses. (Repealed by Education Act 1918 (8 & 9 Geo. 5. c. 39))
Loan Act 1901 (repealed)	1 Edw. 7. c. 12	17 August 1901
An Act to provide for raising Money for the service of the year ending the thirty-first day of March nineteen hundred and two. (Repealed by Statute Law Revision Act 1927 (17 & 18 Geo. 5. c. 42))
Agricultural Rates Act 1896, &c., Continuance Act 1901 (repealed)	1 Edw. 7. c. 13	17 August 1901
An Act to continue the Agricultural Rates Act, 1896, (Note: Agricultural Rates Act 1896 (59 & 60 Vict. c. 16)) the Tithe Rentcharge (Rates) Act, 1899, (Note: Tithe Rentcharge (Rates) Act 1899 (62 & 63 Vict. c. 17)) the Agricultural Rates, Congested Districts, and Burgh Land Tax Relief (Scotland) Act, 1896, (Note: Agricultural Rates, Congested Districts, and Burgh Land Tax Relief (Scotland) Act 1896 (59 & 60 Vict. c. 37)) and the Local Taxation Account (Scotland) Act, 1898. (Note: Local Taxation Account (Scotland) Act 1898 (61 & 62 Vict. c. 56)) (Repealed by Expiring Laws Continuance Act 1909 (9 Edw. 7. c. 46))
Militia and Yeomanry Act 1901 (repealed)	1 Edw. 7. c. 14	17 August 1901
An Act to amend the Law relating to the Militia and Yeomanry. (Repealed by Territorial Army and Militia Act 1921 (11 & 12 Geo. 5. c. 37))
Royal Titles Act 1901 (repealed)	1 Edw. 7. c. 15	17 August 1901
An Act to enable His most gracious Majesty to make an Addition to the Royal Style and Titles in recognition of His Majesty's dominions beyond the seas. (Repealed by Statute Law Revision Act 1958 (6 & 7 Eliz. 2. c. 46))
National Gallery (Purchase of Adjacent Land) Act 1901 (repealed)	1 Edw. 7. c. 16	17 August 1901
An Act for the acquisition of certain land, near the National Gallery in London, and for purposes connected therewith. (Repealed by Statute Law (Repeals) Act 1978 (c. 45))
Lunacy (Ireland) Act 1901 (repealed)	1 Edw. 7. c. 17	17 August 1901
An Act to amend the Law relating to Lunatics in Ireland. (Repealed by Judicature (Northern Ireland) Act 1978 (c. 23))
Patents Act 1901 (repealed)	1 Edw. 7. c. 18	17 August 1901
An Act to amend the Law with reference to International Arrangements for Patents. (Repealed by Patents and Designs Act 1907 (7 Edw. 7. c. 29))
Public Libraries Act 1901 (repealed)	1 Edw. 7. c. 19	17 August 1901
An Act to amend the Acts relating to Public Libraries, Museums and Gymnasiums and to regulate the Liability of Managers of Libraries to Proceedings for Libel. (Repealed by Public Libraries and Museums Act 1964 (c. 75))
Youthful Offenders Act 1901 (repealed)	1 Edw. 7. c. 20	17 August 1901
An Act to amend the Law relating to Youthful Offenders and for other purposes connected therewith. (Repealed by Children Act 1908 (8 Edw. 7. c. 67))
Appropriation Act 1901 (repealed)	1 Edw. 7. c. 21	17 August 1901
An Act to apply a sum out of the Consolidated Fund to the service of the year ending on the thirty-first day of March one thousand nine hundred and two, and to appropriate the Supplies granted in this Session of Parliament. (Repealed by Statute Law Revision Act 1927 (17 & 18 Geo. 5. c. 42))
Factory and Workshop Act 1901 (repealed)	1 Edw. 7. c. 22	17 August 1901
An Act to consolidate with Amendments the Factory and Workshop Acts. (Repealed for England and Wales and Scotland by Factories Act 1937 (1 Edw. 8 & 1 Geo. 6. c. 67) and for Northern Ireland by Quarries Act (Northern Ireland) 1927 (17 & 18 Geo. 5. c. 19 (N.I.)), Factories Act (Northern Ireland) 1938 (2 Geo. 6. c. 23 (N.I.)) and Education Act (Northern Ireland) 1947 (c. 3 (N.I.)))
Marriages Legalization Act 1901 (repealed)	1 Edw. 7. c. 23	17 August 1901
An Act for legalizing Marriages heretofore solemnized in certain Churches and Places. (Repealed by Statute Law (Repeals) Act 1977 (c. 18))
Burgh Sewerage, Drainage and Water Supply (Scotland) Act 1901 (repealed)	1 Edw. 7. c. 24	17 August 1901
An Act to amend the Law in regard to the Sewerage and Drainage and Water Supply of Burghs in Scotland. (Repealed by Sewerage (Scotland) Act 1968 (c. 47))
East India Loan (Great Indian Peninsula Railway Debentures) Act 1901 (repealed)	1 Edw. 7. c. 25	17 August 1901
An Act to enable the Secretary of State in Council of India to raise Money in the United Kingdom for the purpose of paying off or redeeming Debentures of the Great Indian Peninsula Railway Company. (Repealed by East India Loans Act 1937 (1 Edw. 8 & 1 Geo. 6. c. 14))
Births and Deaths Registration Act 1901 (repealed)	1 Edw. 7. c. 26	17 August 1901
An Act to amend the Law with respect to Districts for registration purposes and the appointment of Superintendent Registrars of Births and Deaths in certain Unions. (Repealed by Local Government Act 1929 (19 & 20 Geo. 5. c. 17))
Intoxicating Liquors (Sale to Children) Act 1901 (repealed)	1 Edw. 7. c. 27	17 August 1901
An Act to prevent the Sale of Intoxicating Liquors to Children. (Repealed for England and Wales and Scotland by Licensing (Scotland) Act 1903 (3 Edw. 7. c. 25) and Licensing (Consolidation) Act 1910 (10 Edw. 7 & 1 Geo. 5. c. 24) and for Northern Ireland by Licensing Act (Northern Ireland) 1971 (c. 13 (N.I.)))
Local Government (Ireland) Act 1901 (repealed)	1 Edw. 7. c. 28	17 August 1901
An Act to amend sections fifty-four, fifty-six, fifty-seven and seventy-one of the Local Government (Ireland) Act, 1898, (Note: Local Government (Ireland) Act 1898 (61 & 62 Vict. c. 37)) and to make provision with respect to the making of rates in certain urban districts in Ireland. (Repealed by Rates (Northern Ireland) Order 1972 (SI 1972/1633 (N.I. 16)))
Colonial Acts Confirmation Act 1901 (repealed)	1 Edw. 7. c. 29	17 August 1901
An Act to confirm certain Acts of Colonial Legislatures. (Repealed by Statute Law (Repeals) Act 1989 (c. 43))
Purchase of Land (Ireland) (No. 2) Act 1901 (repealed)	1 Edw. 7. c. 30	17 August 1901
An Act to extend the Purchase of Land (Ireland) Amendment Act, 1889. (Note: Purchase of Land (Ireland) Amendment Act 1889 (52 & 53 Vict. c. 13)) (Repealed by Statute Law Revision Act 1950 (14 Geo. 6. c. 6))
Pacific Cable Act 1901 (repealed)	1 Edw. 7. c. 31	17 August 1901
An Act to provide for the Construction and Working of a Submarine Cable from the Island of Vancouver to New Zealand and to Queensland. (Repealed by Pacific Cable Act 1927 (17 & 18 Geo. 5. c. 9))
Isle of Man (Customs) Act 1901 (repealed)	1 Edw. 7. c. 32	17 August 1901
An Act to amend the Law with respect to Customs Duties in the Isle of Man. (Repealed by Statute Law Revision Act 1927 (17 & 18 Geo. 5. c. 42))
Expiring Laws Continuance Act 1901 (repealed)	1 Edw. 7. c. 33	17 August 1901
An Act to continue various Expiring Laws. (Repealed by Statute Law Revision Act 1927 (17 & 18 Geo. 5. c. 42))
Congested Districts Board (Ireland) Act 1901 (repealed)	1 Edw. 7. c. 34	17 August 1901
An Act to amend the Congested Districts Board (Ireland) Acts. (Repealed by Statute Law Revision Act 1950 (14 Geo. 6. c. 6))
Public Works Loans Act 1901 (repealed)	1 Edw. 7. c. 35	17 August 1901
An Act to grant Money for the purpose of certain Local Loans out of the Local Loans Fund and for other purposes relating to Local Loans. (Repealed by Statute Law Revision Act 1927 (17 & 18 Geo. 5. c. 42))
Light Railway Commissioners (Salaries) Act 1901 (repealed)	1 Edw. 7. c. 36	17 August 1901
An Act to provide for the Payment of another of the Light Railway Commissioners. (Repealed by Railways Act 1921 (11 & 12 Geo. 5. c. 55))
Valuation (Ireland) Act 1901 (repealed)	1 Edw. 7. c. 37	17 August 1901
An Act to make provision with respect to Valuation Lists and Rates in cases of a re-valuation under Section Sixty-five of the Local Government (Ireland) Act, 1898. (Repealed by Statute Law Revision Act 1927 (17 & 18 Geo. 5. c. 42))
Fisheries (Ireland) Act 1901 (repealed)	1 Edw. 7. c. 38	17 August 1901
An Act to amend the Steam Trawling (Ireland) Act, 1889. (Note: Steam Trawling (Ireland) Act 1889 (52 & 53 Vict. c. 74)) (Repealed by Fisheries Amendment (Northern Ireland) Order 1981 (SI 1981/227 (N.I. 7)))
Naval Works Act 1901 (repealed)	1 Edw. 7. c. 39	17 August 1901
An Act to make further provision for the Construction of Works in the United Kingdom and elsewhere for the purposes of the Royal Navy. (Repealed by Statute Law Revision Act 1927 (17 & 18 Geo. 5. c. 42))
Military Works Act 1901 (repealed)	1 Edw. 7. c. 40	17 August 1901
An Act to make further Provision for Defraying the Expenses of certain Military Works and other Military Services. (Repealed by Statute Law Revision Act 1927 (17 & 18 Geo. 5. c. 42))

=== Local acts ===
Short title	Citation	Royal assent
Long title
Henry Diaper and Company (Delivery Warrants) Act 1901	1 Edw. 7. c. i	2 July 1901
An Act to enable Henry Diaper and Company of Liverpool to issue transferable certificates and warrants for the delivery of goods and for other purposes.
Paisley Gas Order Confirmation Act 1901	1 Edw. 7. c. ii	2 July 1901
An Act to confirm a Provisional Order under the Burgh Police (Scotland) Act 1892 (Note: Burgh Police (Scotland) Act 1892 (55 & 56 Vict. c. 55)) relating to Paisley.
	Paisley Gas Order 1901 Paisley Gas.	
Thames and Severn Canal Order Confirmation Act 1901	1 Edw. 7. c. iii	2 July 1901
An Act to confirm an Order made by the Board of Trade under the Railway and Canal Traffic Act 1888 (Note: Railway and Canal Traffic Act 1888 (51 & 52 Vict. c. 25)) for the transfer of the Thames and Severn Canal to the County Council of Gloucestershire and for other purposes.
	Thames and Severn Canal Order 1901 Order made in pursuance of Section 45 of the Railway and Canal Traffic Act 1888 for the transfer of the Thames and Severn Canal to the County Council of Gloucestershire and for other purposes.	
Gravesend Gas Act 1901	1 Edw. 7. c. iv	2 July 1901
An Act to convert and consolidate the existing capital of the Gravesend and Milton Gaslight Company to confer further powers upon that Company and for other purposes.
Honley Urban District Council (Gas) Act 1901 (repealed)	1 Edw. 7. c. v	2 July 1901
An Act to transfer to and vest in the Honley Urban District Council the undertaking of the Honley Gas Company Limited and to confer upon that Council powers for the supply of gas and for other purposes. (Repealed by Huddersfield Gas Order 1939 (SR&O 1939/801))
Folkestone Corporation Act 1901 (repealed)	1 Edw. 7. c. vi	2 July 1901
An Act to increase the number of the Council of the borough of Folkestone in the county of Kent and for other purposes. (Repealed by County of Kent Act 1981 (c. xviii))
Gateshead and District Tramways Act 1901	1 Edw. 7. c. vii	2 July 1901
An Act to enable the Gateshead and District Tramways Company to raise additional capital and for other purposes.
Bath Gas Act 1901	1 Edw. 7. c. viii	2 July 1901
An Act to extend the limits of supply of the Bath Gaslight and Coke Company to authorise the raising of additional capital and for other purposes.
Bristol Clifton and West of England Zoological Society's Act 1901	1 Edw. 7. c. ix	2 July 1901
An Act to alter and amend certain provisions of the deed of constitution of the Bristol Clifton and West of England Zoological Society and for other purposes.
Royal Exchange Assurance Act 1901	1 Edw. 7. c. x	2 July 1901
An Act to repeal the Special Acts of the Royal Exchange Assurance and to make further provisions in relation to the laws objects and regulations of the Royal Exchange Assurance and for other purposes.
Sheffield District Railway Act 1901	1 Edw. 7. c. xi	2 July 1901
An Act to authorise the Sheffield District Railway Company to raise additional capital by the creation and issue of debenture stock for the purposes of their undertaking.
Alfreton Gas Act 1901	1 Edw. 7. c. xii	2 July 1901
An Act for incorporating and conferring powers upon the Alfreton Gas Company and for other purposes.
Omagh Gas Act 1901 (repealed)	1 Edw. 7. c. xiii	2 July 1901
An Act to dissolve the Omagh Gas Company and to incorporate and confer powers on a new company. (Repealed by Omagh Urban District Gas Act 1902 (2 Edw. 7. c. cxlvii))
Oakham Water Act 1901	1 Edw. 7. c. xiv	2 July 1901
An Act to incorporate and confer powers for the supply of water upon the Oakham Water Company.
London Bridge Widening Act 1901	1 Edw. 7. c. xv	2 July 1901
An Act to empower the Corporation of the city of London to widen London Bridge and for other purposes.
Neath Harbour Act 1901	1 Edw. 7. c. xvi	2 July 1901
An Act to reduce and regulate the amount of the debt upon the Neath Harbour undertaking and for other purposes.
Thames Deep Water Dock Act 1901	1 Edw. 7. c. xvii	2 July 1901
An Act to revive the powers and extend the periods for the compulsory purchase of lands for and for the completion of the dock and works authorised by the Thames Deep Water Dock Act 1881 (Note: Thames Deep Water Dock Act 1881 (44 & 45 Vict. c. cxlii)) and for other purposes.
School for Orphans of Freemen of the City of London Act 1901	1 Edw. 7. c. xviii	2 July 1901
An Act to authorise and provide for the removal of the School for Orphans of Freemen of the City of London to a new site in the parish of Walton-on-the-Hill in the county of Surrey and the sale of the site and buildings at Brixton now occupied by the School and for other purposes.
Otley Gas Act 1901	1 Edw. 7. c. xix	2 July 1901
An Act for incorporating and conferring powers on the Otley Gas Company.
Horley District Gas Act 1901	1 Edw. 7. c. xx	2 July 1901
An Act for incorporating and conferring powers upon the Horley District Gas Company and for other purposes.
Mersey Docks (Canada Dock Works, &c.) Act 1901	1 Edw. 7. c. xxi	2 July 1901
An Act to authorise the Mersey Docks and Harbour Board to construct an additional branch dock in connection with their Canada Dock and for other purposes.
Bury Corporation Tramways Act 1901 (repealed)	1 Edw. 7. c. xxii	2 July 1901
An Act to authorise the Corporation of Bury to construct additional tramways within and adjacent to the borough to make certain street works and improvements and for other purposes. (Repealed by Bury Corporation Act 1909 (9 Edw. 7. c. clix))
Great Northern Railway Act 1901	1 Edw. 7. c. xxiii	2 July 1901
An Act to confer further powers upon the Great Northern Railway Company.
Midland Railway Act 1901	1 Edw. 7. c. xxiv	2 July 1901
An Act to confer additional powers upon the Midland Railway Company and upon the Norfolk and Suffolk Joint Railways Committee and upon the Midland and Great Northern Railways Joint Committee for the construction of works and the acquisition of lands and for other purposes.
Grangemouth Water Order Confirmation Act 1901	1 Edw. 7. c. xxv	2 July 1901
An Act to confirm a Provisional Order under the Private Legislation Procedure (Scotland) Act 1899 (Note: Private Legislation Procedure (Scotland) Act 1899 (62 & 63 Vict. c. 47)) relating to the Water Supply of the Burgh of Grangemouth.
	Grangemouth Water Order 1901 Provisional Order to authorise the Provost Magistrates and Councillors of the Burgh of Grangemouth to acquire Lands and to construct and maintain additional Works in connexion with their existing Water Supply and for other purposes.	
Scottish Provident Institution Order Confirmation Act 1901 (repealed)	1 Edw. 7. c. xxvi	2 July 1901
An Act to confirm a Provisional Order under the Private Legislation Procedure (Scotland) Act 1899 relating to Scottish Provident Institution. (Repealed by Scottish Provident Institution Act 1927 (17 & 18 Geo. 5. c. xv))
	Scottish Provident Institution Order 1901	
Ardrossan Harbour Order Confirmation Act 1901	1 Edw. 7. c. xxvii	2 July 1901
An Act to confirm a Provisional Order under the Private Legislation Procedure (Scotland) Act 1899 relating to Ardrossan Harbour.
	Ardrossan Harbour Order 1901 Provisional Order to confer on the Ardrossan Harbour Company pilotage and other powers in respect of the Harbour Docks and other works within the Harbour of Ardrossan and for other purposes.	
Ayr Harbour Order Confirmation Act 1901	1 Edw. 7. c. xxviii	2 July 1901
An Act to confirm a Provisional Order under the Private Legislation Procedure (Scotland) Act 1899 relating to Ayr Harbour.
	Ayr Harbour Order 1901 Provisional Order for enabling the Glasgow and South Western Railway Company to guarantee the interest on the Debenture Stock affecting the Undertaking of the Ayr Harbour Trustees for giving effect to an Agreement between the Trustees and that Company with respect to such guarantee and other matters for altering the constitution of the Ayr Harbour Trust and for other purposes.	
Highland Railway Order Confirmation Act 1901	1 Edw. 7. c. xxix	2 July 1901
An Act to confirm a Provisional Order under the Private Legislation Procedure (Scotland) Act 1899 relating to the Highland Railway Company.
	Highland Railway Order 1901 Provisional Order to enable the Highland Railway Company to raise further Capital to construct a new Railway being a doubling of a portion of their existing Railway and for other purposes.	
Hamilton Burgh Order Confirmation Act 1901	1 Edw. 7. c. xxx	2 July 1901
An Act to confirm a Provisional Order under the Private Legislation Procedure (Scotland) Act 1899 relating to the Burgh of Hamilton.
	Hamilton Burgh Order 1901 Provisional Order to amend the Hamilton Burgh Act 1878 (Note: Hamilton Burgh Act 1878 (41 & 42 Vict. c. cxxxvii)) with regard to assessments and to the common good of the burgh and for other purposes.	
Falkirk and District Tramways Order Confirmation Act 1901	1 Edw. 7. c. xxxi	2 July 1901
An Act to confirm a Provisional Order under the Private Legislation Procedure (Scotland) Act 1899 relating to the Falkirk and District Tramways.
	Falkirk and District Tramways Order 1901 Provisional Order to incorporate the Falkirk and District Tramways Company and to empower that Company to make and maintain Tramways and for other purposes.	
Military Lands Provisional Orders Confirmation Act 1901 (repealed)	1 Edw. 7. c. xxxii	2 July 1901
An Act to confirm certain Provisional Orders of the Secretary of State under the Military Lands Act 1892. (Note: Military Lands Act 1892 (55 & 56 Vict. c. 43)) (Repealed by Statute Law (Repeals) Act 2008 (c. 12))
Metropolitan Commons (Ham) Supplemental Act 1901	1 Edw. 7. c. xxxiii	2 July 1901
An Act to confirm a Scheme relating to Ham Common in the parish of Ham in the county of Surrey.
	Scheme with respect to Ham Common.	
Education Board Provisional Order Confirmation (Acton) Act 1901	1 Edw. 7. c. xxxiv	2 July 1901
An Act to confirm a Provisional Order made by the Board of Education under the Elementary Education Acts 1870 to 1900 to enable the School Board for Acton to put in force the Lands Clauses Acts.
	Acton School Board Order 1901 Provisional Order for putting in force the Lands Clauses Acts.	
Local Government Board (Ireland) Provisional Order Confirmation (No. 1) Act 1901	1 Edw. 7. c. xxxv	2 July 1901
An Act to confirm a Provisional Order of the Local Government Board for Ireland relating to the county and urban district of Carlow.
	Carlow Order 1901 Provisional Order to alter the financial relations between the Urban District of Carlow and the County of Carlow.	
Local Government Board (Ireland) Provisional Orders Confirmation (No. 2) Act 1901	1 Edw. 7. c. xxxvi	2 July 1901
An Act to confirm certain Provisional Orders of the Local Government Board for Ireland relating to the urban districts of Londonderry and Kilkenny and the rural districts of Cork Roscommon Boyle No. 1 and Mountmelick No. 1.
	Londonderry Order 1901 Provisional Order to enable the Urban Sanitary Authority for the County Borough of Londonderry to put in force the Compulsory Clauses of the Lands Clauses Acts.	
	Kilkenny Order 1901 Provisional Order to enable the Urban District Council of Kilkenny to put in force the Compulsory Clauses of the Lands Clauses Acts.	
	Douglas Burial Ground Order 1901 Provisional Order to enable the Council of the Rural District of Cork to put in force the Compulsory Clauses of the Lands Clauses Acts.	
	Roscommon Rural Order 1901 Provisional Order to enable the Council of the Rural District of Roscommon to put in force the Compulsory Clauses of the Lands Clauses Acts.	
	Boyle No. 1 Rural Order 1901 Provisional Order to enable the Council of the Rural District of Boyle No. 1 to put in force the Compulsory Clauses of the Lands Clauses Acts.	
	Mountmelick Burial Ground Order 1901 Provisional Order to enable the Council of the Rural District of Mountmelick No. 1 to put in force the Compusory Clauses of the Lands Clauses Acts.	
Electric Lighting Orders Confirmation (No. 2) Act 1901	1 Edw. 7. c. xxxvii	2 July 1901
An Act to confirm certain Provisional Orders made by the Board of Trade under the Electric Lighting Acts 1882 (Note: Electric Lighting Act 1882 (45 & 46 Vict. c. 56)) and 1888 (Note: Electric Lighting Act 1888 (51 & 52 Vict. c. 12)) relating to Abertillery Aspull Briton Ferry Cannock Ebbw Vale Faversham Llandaff and Dinas Powis Llangollen Neath (borough) and Tredegar.
	Abertillery Electric Lighting Order 1901 Provisional Order granted by the Board of Trade under the Electric Lighting Acts 1882 and 1888 to the Urban District Council of Abertillery in respect of the Urban District of Abertillery in the County of Monmouth.	
	Aspull Electric Lighting Order 1901 Provisional Order granted by the Board of Trade under the Electric Lighting Acts 1882 and 1888 to the Urban District Council of Aspull in respect of the Urban District of Aspull in the County of Lancaster.	
	Briton Ferry Electric Lighting Order 1901 Provisional Order granted by the Board of Trade under the Electric Lighting Acts 1882 and 1888 to the Urban District Council of Briton Ferry in respect of the Urban District of Briton Ferry in the County of Glamorgan.	
	Cannock Electric Lighting Order 1901 Provisional Order granted by the Board of Trade under the Electric Lighting Acts 1882 and 1888 to the Urban District Council of Cannock in respect of the Urban District of Cannock in the County of Stafford.	
	Ebbw Vale Electric Lighting Order 1901 Provisional Order granted by the Board of Trade under the Electric Lighting Acts 1882 and 1888 to the Urban District Council of Ebbw Vale in respect of the Urban District of Ebbw Vale in the Counties of Monmouth and Brecon.	
	Faversham Electric Lighting Order 1901 Provisional Order granted by the Board of Trade under the Electric Lighting Acts 1882 and 1888 to the Mayor Aldermen and Burgesses of the Borough of Faversham in respect of the Borough of Faversham in the County of Kent.	
	Llandaff and Dinas Powis Electric Lighting Order 1901 Provisional Order granted by the Board of Trade under the Electric Lighting Acts 1882 and 1888 to the Rural District Council of Llandaff and Dinas Powis in respect of the Rural District of Llandaff and Dinas Powis in the County of Glamorgan.	
	Llangollen Electric Lighting Order 1901 Provisional Order granted by the Board of Trade under the Electric Lighting Acts 1882 and 1888 to the Urban District Council of Llangollen in respect of the Urban District of Llangollen in the County of Denbigh.	
	Neath (Borough) Electric Lighting Order 1901 Provisional Order granted by the Board of Trade under the Electric Lighting Acts 1882 and 1888 to the Mayor Aldermen and Burgesses of the Borough of Neath in respect of the Borough of Neath in the County of Glamorgan.	
	Tredegar Electric Lighting Order 1901 Provisional Order granted by the Board of Trade under the Electric Lighting Acts 1882 and 1888 to the Urban District Council of Tredegar in respect of the Urban District of Tredegar in the Counties of Monmouth and Brecon.	
Electric Lighting Orders Confirmation (No. 3) Act 1901	1 Edw. 7. c. xxxviii	2 July 1901
An Act to confirm certain Provisional Orders made by the Board of Trade under the Electric Lighting Acts 1882 and 1888 relating to Birstall Cheshunt Dorchester Felling Frome Lichfield Mitcham New Hunstanton Northfleet and Skipton.
	Birstall Electric Lighting Order 1901 Provisional Order granted by the Board of Trade under the Electric Lighting Acts 1882 and 1888 to the Urban District Council of Birstall in respect of the Urban District of Birstall in the West Riding of the County of York.	
	Cheshunt Electric Lighting Order 1901 Provisional Order granted by the Board of Trade under the Electric Lighting Acts 1882 and 1888 to the Urban District Council of Cheshunt in respect of the Urban District of Cheshunt in the County of Hertford.	
	Dorchester Electric Lighting Order 1901 Provisional Order granted by the Board of Trade under the Electric Lighting Acts 1882 and 1888 to the Mayor Aldermen and Burgesses of the Borough of Dorchester in respect of the Borough of Dorchester in the County of Dorset.	
	Felling Electric Lighting Order 1901 Provisional Order granted by the Board of Trade under the Electric Lighting Acts 1882 and 1888 to the Urban District Council of Felling in respect of the Urban District of Felling in the County of Durham.	
	Frome Electric Lighting Order 1901 Provisional Order granted by the Board of Trade under the Electric Lighting Acts 1882 and 1888 to the Urban District Council of Frome in respect of the Urban District of Frome in the County of Somerset including the part of the Parish of Seiwood transferred as from March 31st 1901 to the Urban District of Frome from the Rural District of Frome.	
	Lichfield Electric Lighting Order 1901 Provisional Order granted by the Board of Trade under the Electric Lighting Acts 1882 and 1888 to the Mayor Aldermen and Citizens of the City of Lichfield in respect of the City of Lichfield in the County of Stafford.	
	Mitcham Electric Lighting Order 1901 Provisional Order granted by the Board of Trade under the Electric Lighting Acts 1882 and 1888 to the Rural District Council of Croydon in respect of the Parish of Mitcham in the County of Surrey.	
	New Hunstanton Electric Lighting Order 1901 Provisional Order granted by the Board of Trade under the Electric Lighting Acts 1882 and 1888 to the Urban District Council of New Hunstanton in respect of the Urban District of New Hunstanton in the County of Norfolk.	
	Northfleet Electric Lighting Order 1901 Provisional Order granted by the Board of Trade under the Electric Lighting Acts 1882 and 1888 to the Urban District Council of Northfleet in respect of the Urban District of Northfleet in the County of Kent.	
	Skipton Electric Lighting Order 1901 Provisional Order granted by the Board of Trade under the Electric Lighting Acts 1882 and 1888 to the Urban District Council of Skipton in respect of the Urban District of Skipton in the West Riding of the County of York.	
Electric Lighting Orders Confirmation (No. 4) Act 1901	1 Edw. 7. c. xxxix	2 July 1901
An Act to confirm certain Provisional Orders made by the Board of Trade under the Electric Lighting Acts 1882 and 1888 relating to Atherton Benwell and Fenham Beverley Burgess Hill Chesham East Cowes Hindley Honley Standish-with-Langtree and Stratford-upon-Avon.
	Atherton Electric Lighting Order 1901	
	Benwell and Fenham Electric Lighting Order 1901	
	Beverley Electric Lighting Order 1901	
	Burgess Hill Electric Lighting Order 1901	
	Chesham Electric Lighting Order 1901	
	East Cowes Electric Lighting Order 1901	
	Hindley Electric Lighting Order 1901	
	Honley Electric Lighting Order 1901	
	Standish-with-Langtree Electric Lighting Order 1901	
	Stratford-upon-Avon Electric Lighting Order 1901	
Local Government Board's Provisional Orders Confirmation (No. 1) Act 1901	1 Edw. 7. c. xl	2 July 1901
An Act to confirm certain Provisional Orders of the Local Government Board relating to Carlisle Erith Hornsey Oxford and Whitley and Monkseaton.
	Carlisle Order 1901 Provisional Order to enable the Urban District Council for the City of Carlisle to put in force the Compulsory Clauses of the Lands Clauses Acts.	
	Erith Order 1901 Provisional Order to enable the Urban District Council of Erith to put in force the Compulsory Clauses of the Lands Clauses Acts.	
	Hornsey Order 1901 Provisional Order to enable the Urban District Council of Hornsey to put in force the Compulsory Clauses of the Lands Clauses Acts.	
	Oxford Order 1901 Provisional Order to enable the Urban Sanitary Authority for the City of Oxford to put in force the Compulsory Clauses of the Lands Clauses Acts.	
	Whitley and Monkseaton Order 1901 Provisional Order to enable the Urban District Council of Whitley and Monkseaton to put in force the Compulsory Clauses of the Lands Clauses Acts.	
Local Government Board's Provisional Orders Confirmation (No. 2) Act 1901	1 Edw. 7. c. xli	2 July 1901
An Act to confirm certain Provisional Orders of the Local Government Board relating to Bilston Buxton Leicester (two) Milton next Sittingbourne Neath and Newton in Mackerfield.
	Bilston Order 1901 Provisional Order for altering the Bilston Improvement Act 1896. (Note: Bilston Improvement Act 1896 (59 & 60 Vict. c. ccxxxix))	
	Buxton Order 1901 Provisional Order for altering a Local Act (Note: Buxton Local Board Act 1873 (36 & 37 Vict. c. lvi)) and certain Confirming Acts..	
	Leicester Order 1901 Provisional Order for altering a Confirming Act. (Note: Local Government Board's Provisional Orders Confirmation (No. 11) Act 1893 (56 & 57 Vict. c. cxx))	
	Leicester Order (Sewage Lands) 1901 Provisional Order to enable the Urban Sanitary Authority for the Borough of Leicester to put in force the Compulsory Clauses of the Lands Clauses Acts.	
	Milton next Sittingbourne Order 1901 Provisional Order for altering a Local Act (Note: Milton next Sittingbourne Improvement Act 1838 (1 & 2 Vict. c. ii)) and Confirming Acts.	
	Neath Order 1901 Provisional Order for altering a Local Act (Note: Neath Corporation Gas Act 1874 (37 & 38 Vict. c. c)) and a Confirming Act. (Note: Local Government Board's Provisional Orders Confirmation (No. 4) Act 1893 (56 & 57 Vict. c. cxv))	
	Newton in Mackerfield Order 1901 Provisional Order for altering the Newton District Improvement Act 1855. (Note: Newton District Improvement Act 1855 (18 & 19 Vict. c. c))	
Local Government Board's Provisional Orders Confirmation (No. 3) Act 1901	1 Edw. 7. c. xlii	2 July 1901
An Act to confirm certain Provisional Orders of the Local Government Board relating to Billericay (Rural) Drighlington Heston and Isleworth Sunderland and York.
	Billericay Order 1901 Provisional Order to enable the Rural District Council of Billericay to put in force the Compuisory Clauses of the Lands Clauses Acts.	
	Drighlington Order 1901 Provisional Order to enable the Urban District Council of Drighlington to put in force the Compulsory Clauses of the Lands Clauses Acts.	
	Heston and Isleworth Order 1901 Provisional Order to enable the Urban District Council of Heston and Isleworth to put in force the Compulsory Clauses of the Lands Clauses Acts.	
	Sunderland Order 1901 Provisional Order to enable the Urban Sanitary Authority for the Borough of Sunderland to put in force the Compulsory Clauses of the Lands Clauses Acts.	
	York Order 1901 Provisional Order to enable the Urban Sanitary Autkority for the City of York to put in force the Compulsory Clauses of the Lands Clauses Acts.	
Local Government Board's Provisional Order Confirmation (Gas) Act 1901	1 Edw. 7. c. xliii	2 July 1901
An Act to confirm a Provisional Order of the Local Government Board relating to Shoeburyness.
	Shoeburyness (Gas) Order 1901 Provisional Order under the Gas and Water Works Facilities Act 1870. (Note: Gas and Water Works Facilities Act 1870 (33 & 34 Vict. c. 70))	
Local Government Board's Provisional Orders Confirmation (Poor Law) Act 1901	1 Edw. 7. c. xliv	2 July 1901
An Act to confirm certain Provisional Orders of the Local Government Board relating to the parish of Saint Giles Camberwell the Southampton Incorporation and the Stepney Union.
	Saint Giles Camberwell Order 1901 Provisional Order made in pursuance of subsection (3) of Section 2 of the Poor Law Act 1889. (Note: Poor Law Act 1889 (52 & 53 Vict. c. 56))	
	Southampton Incorporation Order 1901 Provisional Order made in pursuance of subsection (3) of Section 2 of the Poor Law Act 1889.	
	Stepney Union Order 1901 Provisional Order made in pursuance of subsection (3) of Section 2 of the Poor Law Act 1889.	
Regulation and Inclosure (Skipwith) Provisional Orders Act 1901	1 Edw. 7. c. xlv	2 July 1901
An Act to confirm a Provisional Order under the Inclosure Acts 1845 to 1882 for the Regulation of Skipwith Common in the parish of Skipwith in the county of York and a Provisional Order under the said Acts for the inclosure of the common fields in the same parish.
	Skipwith Common Order 1901 Provisional Order for the Regulation of Skipwith Common.	
	Skipwith Open Fields Order 1901 Provisional Order for the Inclosure of Skipwith Open Fields.	
Drainage and Improvement of Lands Supplemental (Ireland) Act 1901	1 Edw. 7. c. xlvi	2 July 1901
An Act to confirm a Provisional Order under the Drainage and Improvement of Lands (Ireland) Act 1863 (Note: Drainage and Improvement of Lands (Ireland) Act 1863 (26 & 27 Vict. c. 88)) and the Acts amending the same relating to the Triogue Drainage District in Queen’s County.
	River Triogue Order 1901 In the matter of the River Triogue Drainage District in the Queen's County.	
Metropolitan Commons (Orpington) Supplemental Act 1901	1 Edw. 7. c. xlvii	2 July 1901
An Act to confirm a Scheme relating to Broom Hill Common and other commons in the parish of Orpington, in the county of Kent.
	Amended Scheme with respect to Broom Hill Common Darrick Common Gumping Common and Sparrow Common.	
Ardrossan Gas and Water Order Confirmation Act 1901	1 Edw. 7. c. xlviii	2 July 1901
An Act to confirm a Provisional Order under the Private Legislation Procedure (Scotland) Act 1899 relating to Ardrossan Gas and Water.
	Ardrossan Gas and Water Order 1901 Provisional Order to authorise the Provost Magistrates and Councillors of the Burgh of Ardrossan to erect construct and maintain new Gasworks and to construct and maintain additional Waterworks and for other purposes.	
North British and Mercantile Insurance Company's Order Confirmation Act 1901 (repealed)	1 Edw. 7. c. xlix	2 July 1901
An Act to confirm a Provisional Order under the Private Legislation Procedure (Scotland) Act 1899 relating to the North British and Mercantile Insurance Company. (Repealed by North British and Mercantile Insurance Company's Act 1920 (10 & 11 Geo. 5. c. cxxxii))
	North British and Mercantile Insurance Company's Order 1901	
Arizona Copper Company Limited Order Confirmation Act 1901	1 Edw. 7. c. l	2 July 1901
An Act to confirm a Provisional Order under the Private Legislation Procedure (Scotland) Act 1899 relating to the Arizona Copper Company Limited.
	Arizona Copper Company Limited Order 1901 Provisional Order to re-arrange and define the Capital of the Arizona Copper Company Limited and for other purposes.	
Inclosure (Sutton) Provisional Order Act 1901	1 Edw. 7. c. li	2 July 1901
An Act to confirm a Provisional Order under the Inclosure Acts 1845 to 1882 for the inclosure of the open fields heath and wastes in the parish of Sutton in the county of Northampton.
	Sutton Inclosure Order 1901 Provisional Order for the Inclosure of the Open Fields Heath and Wastes at Sutton in the County of Northampton.	
Pier and Harbour Orders Confirmation (No. 1) Act 1901	1 Edw. 7. c. lii	2 July 1901
An Act to confirm certain Provisional Orders made by the Board of Trade under the General Pier and Harbour Act 1861 (Note: General Pier and Harbour Act 1861 (24 & 25 Vict. c. 45)) relating to Cellardyke Helmsdale Leitir Mhor Macduff and Porthgain.
	Cellardyke Harbour Order 1901 Provisional Order for authorising the construction of new works at the Harbour of Cellardyke situate in the Burgh and Parish of Kilrenny and County of Fife and the levying of rates in respect of the Harbour and for making provision for the maintenance and regulation of the Harbour and other purposes connected therewith.	
	Helmsdale Harbour Order 1901 Provisional Order for transferring to His Grace Cromartie Sutherland Leveson Gower Duke and Earl of Sutherland (Note: Cromartie Sutherland-Leveson-Gower, 4th Duke of Sutherland.) and his successors in title the Harbour of Helmsdale in the county of Sutherland and for other purposes connected therewith.	
	Leitir Mhor Pier Order 1901 Provisional Order for the construction maintenance and regulation of a Pier and Works at Leitir Mhor in the Parish of Lismore and Appin and County of Argyll.	
	Macduff Harbour Order 1901 Provisional Order for amending the Macduff Harbour Order 1898 with respect to the limit on the amount of the assessment to be levied as the security for money borrowed under that Order and with respect to the time for the commencement of works. under that Order and for other purposes connected therewith.	
	Porthgain Harbour Order 1901 Provisional Order for the construction of a Tidal Dock at Porthgain in the County of Pembroke and for other purposes connected with Porthgain Harbour.	
Irish Presbyterian Church Act 1901	1 Edw. 7. c. liii	2 July 1901
An Act to extend the powers of the trustees of the Presbyterian Church in Ireland in relation to the investment of money and the accepting taking and holding of property and for other purposes.
British Gas Light Company (Hull Station) Act 1901	1 Edw. 7. c. liv	2 July 1901
An Act for empowering the British Gas Light Company Limited to enlarge their works and to expend further capital at Kingston-upon-Hull.
Nitrate Railways Company Limited Act 1901	1 Edw. 7. c. lv	2 July 1901
An Act to amend the Nitrate Railways Company Limited (Conversion of Shares) Act 1891. (Note: Nitrate Railways Company Limited (Conversion of Shares) Act 1891 (54 & 55 Vict. c. xv))
Rodgers' Patent Act 1901	1 Edw. 7. c. lvi	2 July 1901
An Act for rendering valid certain Letters Patent granted to James Godman Rodgers for an invention for improvements in rubber tyres for vehicles.
Aspatria Silloth and District Water Act 1901	1 Edw. 7. c. lvii	2 July 1901
An Act to constitute and incorporate a Joint Water Board for the urban districts of Aspatria and Holme Cultram in the county of Cumberland and to authorise such Joint Water Board to construct works and to supply water to those and adjacent districts and for other purposes.
Newcastle-upon-Tyne and Gateshead Gas Act 1901	1 Edw. 7. c. lviii	2 July 1901
An Act to convert the capital of the Newcastle-upon-Tyne and Gateshead Gas Company to empower the Company to raise additional capital and for other purposes.
Shrewsbury Gas Act 1901	1 Edw. 7. c. lix	2 July 1901
An Act to confer further powers upon the Shrewsbury Gas Light Company.
Cardiff Corporation Act 1901	1 Edw. 7. c. lx	2 July 1901
An Act to empower the Mayor Aldermen and Burgesses of the county borough of Cardiff to construct new intercepting and other sewers and for other purposes.
Leatherhead Gas Act 1901	1 Edw. 7. c. lxi	2 July 1901
An Act for incorporating and conferring powers on the Leatherhead Gas and Lighting Company.
West Surrey Water Act 1901 (repealed)	1 Edw. 7. c. lxii	2 July 1901
An Act for extending the limits of supply of the West Surrey Water Company and for authorising that Company to raise additional capital and for other purposes. (Repealed by Woking Water Order 1959 (SI 1959/1793))
Milford Docks Act 1901 (repealed)	1 Edw. 7. c. lxiii	2 July 1901
An Act to extend the time limited for the completion of the pier and works authorised by the Milford Docks Act 1890 (Note: Milford Docks Act 1890 (53 & 54 Vict. c. lxxv)) and for the compulsory purchase of certain lands and for other purposes. (Repealed by Milford Docks Act 1953 (1 & 2 Eliz. 2. c. x))
Mersey Docks and Harbour Board Act 1901	1 Edw. 7. c. lxiv	2 July 1901
An Act to empower the Mersey Docks and Harbour Board to enclose part of the foreshore of the River Mersey and adjoining lands in the borough of Birkenhead and for other purposes.
Sutton-in-Ashfield Urban District Council (Water) Act 1901 (repealed)	1 Edw. 7. c. lxv	2 July 1901
An Act to confer further powers on the Sutton-in-Ashfield Urban District Council in relation to their water undertaking. (Repealed by Central Nottinghamshire Water Board Order 1963 (SI 1963/1332))
City and South London Railway Act 1901	1 Edw. 7. c. lxvi	2 July 1901
An Act to confer further powers upon the City and South London Railway Company for the raising of capital and for other purposes.
New Swindon Gas Act 1901	1 Edw. 7. c. lxvii	2 July 1901
An Act to confer further powers on the New Swindon Gas Company and for other purposes.
Dublin St. James's Gate Brewery Tramways Act 1901	1 Edw. 7. c. lxviii	2 July 1901
An Act to authorise Arthur Guinness Son and Company (Limited) to construct tramways in the city of Dublin in connexion with St. James’s Gate Brewery and to work the same and their existing tramways by mechanical or other power to construct certain street improvements and for other purposes.
Cambrian Railways Act 1901	1 Edw. 7. c. lxix	2 July 1901
An Act to authorise the Cambrian Railways Company to extend their railway at Pwllheli to grant further powers to that Company in respect of the use of steam vessels and for other purposes.
Glasgow and Renfrew District Railway (Transfer) Act 1901	1 Edw. 7. c. lxx	2 July 1901
An Act for transferring to and vesting in the Caledonian Railway Company and the Glasgow and South Western Railway Company jointly the undertaking of the Glasgow and Renfrew District Railway Company and for other purposes.
London Riverside Fish Market (Transfer to Corporation of London) Act 1901 (repealed)	1 Edw. 7. c. lxxi	2 July 1901
An Act to confirm and give effect to an Agreement for the sale and transfer of the London Riverside Fish Market to the Mayor and Commonalty and Citizens of the City of London and for other purposes. (Repealed by Statute Law (Repeals) Act 2013 (c. 2))
Hull, Barnsley and West Riding Junction Railway and Dock Act 1901	1 Edw. 7. c. lxxii	2 July 1901
An Act to authorise the Hull Barnsley and West Riding Junction Railway and Dock Company to construct new railways and for other purposes.
North Eastern Railway Act 1901	1 Edw. 7. c. lxxiii	2 July 1901
An Act to confer additional powers upon the North Eastern Railway Company for the construction of new railways and other works and the acquisition of additional lands and upon that Company and the Midland and Lancashire and Yorkshire Railway Companies in respect of their Normanton Station and for other purposes.
Chester Gas Act 1901	1 Edw. 7. c. lxxiv	2 July 1901
An Act for conferring further powers upon the Chester United Gas Company.
Prestatyn Water Act 1901	1 Edw. 7. c. lxxv	26 July 1901
An Act to authorise the Urban District Council of Prestatyn to purchase the undertaking of the Dyserth Meliden and Prestatyn Water Company and to authorise the Council to construct additional waterworks and to supply water within the district and adjoining places.
Poulton-le-Fylde Gas Act 1901	1 Edw. 7. c. lxxvi	26 July 1901
An Act to provide for the transfer of the undertaking of the Poulton-le-Fylde Gas Coal Lime and Coke Company Limited to the Poulton-le-Fylde Urban District Council and to authorise that Council to supply gas and for other purposes.
Dorking Gas Act 1901 (repealed)	1 Edw. 7. c. lxxvii	26 July 1901
An Act for conferring further powers on the Dorking Gas Company. (Repealed by East Surrey Gas Order 1928 (SR&O 1928/1019))
Notting Hill Electric Lighting Act 1901	1 Edw. 7. c. lxxviii	26 July 1901
An Act to empower the Notting Hill Electric Lighting Company Limited to acquire lands and to erect and work generating stations and for other purposes.
Colwyn Bay and Colwyn Urban District Gas Act 1901 or the Colwyn Bay and Colwyn Urban District Council Act 1901	1 Edw. 7. c. lxxix	26 July 1901
An Act to provide for the transfer of the undertaking of the Colwyn Bay and District Gas Company to the Colwyn Bay and Colwyn Urban District Council and to authorise that Council to supply Gas and for other purposes.
Derwent Valley Water Act 1901	1 Edw. 7. c. lxxx	26 July 1901
An Act to confer further powers on the Derwent Valley Water Board with respect to their water undertaking and for other purposes.
Petersfield and Selsey Gas Act 1901	1 Edw. 7. c. lxxxi	26 July 1901
An Act for supplying with gas the urban district of Petersfield the parish of Selsey and other places in the counties of Southampton and Sussex.
Richmond Gas Act 1901	1 Edw. 7. c. lxxxii	26 July 1901
An Act to authorise the Richmond Gas Company to raise additional capital to convert their existing capital to enlarge their works to amend their existing Acts and for other purposes.
Tendring Hundred Waterworks Act 1901	1 Edw. 7. c. lxxxiii	26 July 1901
An Act to extend the limits of supply of the Tendring Hundred Waterworks Company to authorise that Company to construct new works to raise further money and for other purposes.
Burgess Hill Water Act 1901 (repealed)	1 Edw. 7. c. lxxxiv	26 July 1901
An Act to authorise the Burgess Hill Water Company to construct additional waterworks acquire lands and raise further moneys and for other purposes. (Repealed by Mid-Sussex Water Order 1985 (SI 1985/513))
Kettering Urban District Water Act 1901	1 Edw. 7. c. lxxxv	26 July 1901
An Act to empower the Urban District Council of Kettering to construct additional waterworks and for other purposes.
Winsford Urban District (Gas Transfer, &c.) Act 1901	1 Edw. 7. c. lxxxvi	26 July 1901
An Act to empower the Urban District Council of Winsford in the county of Chester to manufacture and supply gas and to provide for the transfer to the Council of the undertaking of the Over and Wharton Gas Company Limited or of the liquidators appointed by the said Company and to make further provision in regard to the finance of the said district and for other purposes.
London County Council (Money) Act 1901 (repealed)	1 Edw. 7. c. lxxxvii	26 July 1901
An Act to regulate the expenditure of money by the London County Council on capital account during the current financial period and the raising of money to meet such expenditure. (Repealed by London County Council (Finance Consolidation) Act 1912 (2 & 3 Geo. 5. c. cv))
Cowes Ferry Act 1901	1 Edw. 7. c. lxxxviii	26 July 1901
An Act to empower the Urban District Councils of Cowes and East Cowes to take on lease the existing Royal Ferry across the River Medina between their respective districts and to work and manage the same and for other purposes.
Pembroke Urban District Council Act 1901	1 Edw. 7. c. lxxxix	26 July 1901
An Act to confer powers on the Urban District Council of Pembroke in the county of Dublin with respect to sanitary matters streets buildings and other matters for the good government of their district and to borrow moneys and for other purposes.
Great Eastern Railway (General Powers) Act 1901	1 Edw. 7. c. xc	26 July 1901
An Act to authorise the Great Eastern Railway Company to execute further works and to purchase additional lands to sanction and confirm the purchase of certain lands to confer further powers upon the Company and the Great Northern and Great Eastern Joint Committee to extend the periods limited by former Acts for the purchase of lands and the construction of works by the Company to provide for the consolidation of certain preference stocks of the Company and for other purposes.
Newry Port and Harbour Trust Act 1901	1 Edw. 7. c. xci	26 July 1901
An Act to incorporate Trustees for the maintenance and improvement of the port and harbour of Newry Newry River and Newry Canal to transfer to them the undertaking of the Newry Navigation Company to authorise the Trustees to borrow money and for other purposes.
Tees Valley Water Act 1901 (repealed)	1 Edw. 7. c. xcii	26 July 1901
An Act to confer further powers on the Tees Valley Water Board in relation to the supply of water. (Repealed by Tees Valley Water (Consolidation) Act 1907 (7 Edw. 7. c. lxxx))
Faversham Water Act 1901	1 Edw. 7. c. xciii	26 July 1901
An Act for incorporating and conferring powers on the Faversham Water Company.
Bristol Corporation (Cemetery) Act 1901	1 Edw. 7. c. xciv	26 July 1901
An Act to empower the Mayor Aldermen and Burgesses of the City of Bristol to enlarge their Greenbank Cemetery and for other purposes.
King's Norton and Northfield Urban District Tramways Act 1901	1 Edw. 7. c. xcv	26 July 1901
An Act to empower the Urban District Council of King’s Norton and Northfield to construct tramways and to make provision in regard to tramways in and in the neighbourhood of the said district and for other purposes.
Llandrindod Wells Water Act 1901 (repealed)	1 Edw. 7. c. xcvi	26 July 1901
An Act to authorise the Urban District Council of Llandrindod Wells to purchase the undertaking of the Llandrindod Wells Water Company and to authorise the Council to construct additional waterworks and to supply water within the district and adjoining places. (Repealed by Radnorshire and North Breconshire Water Board Order 1965 (SI 1965/1290))
Mansfield Corporation Act 1901	1 Edw. 7. c. xcvii	26 July 1901
An Act to empower the Corporation of Mansfield to make a street widening to authorise the Corporation to acquire the undertaking of the Mansfield Woodhouse Gas Light and Coke Company Limited to make further provisions with respect to their gas water and electrical undertakings to confer further powers in regard to streets buildings and sewers and the health local government and improvement of the borough and for other purposes.
Aire and Calder Navigation Act 1901	1 Edw. 7. c. xcviii	26 July 1901
An Act to make further provisions with reference to and to confer further powers on the Undertakers of the Aire and Calder Navigation to amend the Acts relating to their undertaking and for other purposes.
South Western and Isle of Wight Junction Railway Act 1901	1 Edw. 7. c. xcix	26 July 1901
An Act for making and maintaining railways in the county of Southampton to be called the South Western and Isle of Wight Junction Railway and for other purposes.
Stroud Gas Act 1901	1 Edw. 7. c. c	26 July 1901
An Act to authorise the Stroud Gas Light and Coke Company to convert their existing capital to raise additional capital to amend their existing Act and for other purposes.
Barry Railway (Extension of Time) Act 1901	1 Edw. 7. c. ci	26 July 1901
An Act to extend the time for the completion of certain railways of the Barry Railway Company.
Handsworth Urban District Council Act 1901 (repealed)	1 Edw. 7. c. cii	26 July 1901
An Act for conferring further powers upon the Urban District Council of Handsworth with respect to tramways and electric lighting and for other purposes. (Repealed by Handsworth Urban District Council Act 1911 (1 & 2 Geo. 5. c. lxxxi))
Bexley Tramways Act 1901	1 Edw. 7. c. ciii	26 July 1901
An Act to empower the Urban District Council of Bexley to construct And work tramways and for other purposes.
Cleveland and Durham County Electric Power Act 1901	1 Edw. 7. c. civ	26 July 1901
An Act for incorporating and conferring powers on the Cleveland and Durham County Electric Power Company.
Dublin Corporation (Markets, &c.) Act 1901	1 Edw. 7. c. cv	26 July 1901
An Act to authorise the Municipal Corporation of the City of Dublin to establish and maintain a market for the sale of old clothes and other commodities in certain market buildings to be constructed and conveyed to them as a free gift by the Right Honourable Edward Cecil Baron Iveagh K.P. and for other purposes.
Great Central Railway Act 1901	1 Edw. 7. c. cvi	26 July 1901
An Act to enable the Great Central Railway Company to make new railways and other works to acquire additional lands to extend the time for the compulsory purchase of certain lands for the completion of certain railways and for the sale of the superfluous lands of the Manchester South Junction and Altrincham Railway Company and the Wrexham Mold and Connah's Quay Railway Company to confer further powers upon the Nottingham Joint Station Committee and for other purposes.
Lancashire and Yorkshire Railway (Various Powers) Act 1901	1 Edw. 7. c. cvii	26 July 1901
An Act for conferring further powers on the Lancashire and Yorkshire Railway Company with relation to their own undertaking and upon that Company and the London and North Western Railway Company with relation to the Preston and Wyre Railway and the Great Northern Railway Company with relation to lands at Wakefield and for other purposes.
Sheffield Corporation Act 1901 (repealed)	1 Edw. 7. c. cviii	26 July 1901
An Act to empower the Lord Mayor Aldermen and Citizens of the City of Sheffield to execute certain street improvements and other works to construct additional lines of tramways to discontinue Fitzalan Market and to reconstruct enlarge and improve certain existing markets and abattoirs and for other purposes. (Repealed by Sheffield Corporation (Consolidation) Act 1918 (8 & 9 Geo. 5. c. lxi))
Bideford and Clovelly Railway (Abandonment) Act 1901 (repealed)	1 Edw. 7. c. cix	26 July 1901
An Act for the abandonment of the Bideford and Clovelly Railway. (Repealed by Statute Law (Repeals) Act 2013 (c. 2))
Chesterfield Improvement Act 1901 (repealed)	1 Edw. 7. c. cx	26 July 1901
An Act to authorise the Corporation of Chesterfield to execute certain street improvements and works to make further provision for the improvement local government and health of the borough of Chesterfield and for other purposes. (Repealed by Chesterfield Corporation Act 1923 (13 & 14 Geo. 5. c. xcix))
London, Brighton and South Coast Railway Act 1901	1 Edw. 7. c. cxi	26 July 1901
An Act to confer further powers on the London Brighton and South Coast Railway Company and for other purposes.
Aldershot Gas and Water Act 1901	1 Edw. 7. c. cxii	26 July 1901
An Act to empower the Aldershot Gas and Water Company to raise additional capital and for other purposes.
Bury Corporation Act 1901 (repealed)	1 Edw. 7. c. cxiii	26 July 1901
An Act to authorise the Corporation of Bury to purchase and hold lands for the purposes of their sewage gas and other works and to make further and better provision in relation to the local government of the borough of Bury and for other purposes. (Repealed by Bury Corporation Act 1909 (9 Edw. 7. c. clix))
Wisbech Water Act 1901	1 Edw. 7. c. cxiv	26 July 1901
An Act to extend the limits of supply of the Wisbech Waterworks Company and to confer further powers upon that Company.
Tottenham and Hampstead Junction Railway Act 1901	1 Edw. 7. c. cxv	26 July 1901
An Act for empowering the Tottenham and Hampstead Junction Railway Company to widen a portion of their railway and for other purposes.
Yorkshire Electric Power Act 1901	1 Edw. 7. c. cxvi	26 July 1901
An Act for incorporating and conferring powers on the Yorkshire Electric Power Company.
Lynton and Barnstaple Railway Act 1901	1 Edw. 7. c. cxvii	26 July 1901
An Act to authorise the Lynton and Barnstaple Railway Company to raise further moneys.
Dublin, Wicklow and Wexford Railway (New Ross and Waterford Extension) Act 1901	1 Edw. 7. c. cxviii	26 July 1901
An Act to amend the Dublin Wicklow and Wexford Railway (New Ross and Waterford Extension) Act 1897 (Note: Dublin Wicklow and Wexford Railway (New Ross and Waterford Extension) Act 1897 (60 & 61 Vict. c. cci)) and to enable the Dublin Wicklow and Wexford Railway Company to alter the level of a certain public road in the townland of Rosbercon and county of Wexford and to carry Railway No. 1 authorised by the said Act across the said road on the level and for other purposes.
Bingley Urban District Council Act 1901	1 Edw. 7. c. cxix	26 July 1901
An Act to authorise the Urban District Council of Bingley to purchase the undertaking of the Cullingworth Gas Company Limited to make certain street works and to make better provision for the health local government and improvement of the district and for other purposes.
Caledonian Railway Act 1901	1 Edw. 7. c. cxx	26 July 1901
An Act to confer further powers on the Caledonian Railway Company in relation to their undertaking to extend the periods for the completion of works by the Caledonian the Callander and Oban the Lanarkshire and Ayrshire the Lochearnhead St. Fillans and Comrie and the Paisley and Barrhead District Railway Companies and for other purposes.
Derbyshire and Nottinghamshire Electric Power Act 1901	1 Edw. 7. c. cxxi	26 July 1901
An Act for incorporating and conferring powers on the Derbyshire and Nottinghamshire Electric Power Company.
Eccles Corporation Act 1901	1 Edw. 7. c. cxxii	26 July 1901
An Act to enable the Mayor Aldermen and Burgesses of the Borough of Eccles to reconstruct their existing and to construct additional tramways to make street improvements to raise additional moneys by mortgage and to make further provisions for the good government of the borough.
Great Western Railway Act 1901	1 Edw. 7. c. cxxiii	26 July 1901
An Act for conferring further powers upon the Great Western Railway Company in respect of their own undertaking and upon that Company and the London and North Western Railway Company in respect of undertakings in which they are jointly interested and upon the Great Western and Great Central Railways Joint Committee in respect of their undertaking for vesting the undertakings of the Devon and Somerset and the Bridport Railway Companies in the Great Western Railway Company for transferring to that Company the powers of the Windsor and Ascot Railway Company and extending the time for the construction of the authorised railways of that Company for empowering the Lambourn Valley Railway Company to raise further moneys and for other purposes.
Kingston-upon-Hull Corporation Act 1901	1 Edw. 7. c. cxxiv	26 July 1901
An Act to empower the Corporation of Kingston-upon-Hull to make certain street works to construct a bridge over the River Hull to lay down tramways and to confer further powers on the Corporation in regard to the water supply health local government and improvement of the city and for other purposes.
Swanage Gas and Water Act 1901	1 Edw. 7. c. cxxv	26 July 1901
An Act for incorporating and conferring powers on a company to be called the Swanage Gas and Water Company and to authorise the transfer to that Company of certain existing gasworks and waterworks and powers in the parish of Swanage in the county of Dorset and the construction of additional waterworks and for other purposes.
Saint Bartholemew's Hospital Act 1901	1 Edw. 7. c. cxxvi	26 July 1901
An Act to enable the Mayor and Commonalty and Citizens of the City of London Governors of the House of the Poor commonly called Saint Bartholomew's Hospital near West Smithfield London of the Foundation of King Henry the Eighth to acquire certain lands necessary or desirable for the extension of the hospital and for other purposes.
Torrington and Okehampton Railway Act 1901	1 Edw. 7. c. cxxvii	26 July 1901
An Act to extend the time for the compulsory purchase of lands for and completion of the railways authorised by the Torrington and Okehampton Railway Act 1895 (Note: Torrington and Okehampton Railway Act 1895 (58 & 59 Vict. c. cxxxix)) and the Torrington and Okehampton Railway Act 1898 (Note: Torrington and Okehampton Railway Act 1898 (61 & 62 Vict. c. lvi)) and to change the name of the Torrington and Okehampton Railway Company and for other purposes.
Blackpool Improvement Act 1901	1 Edw. 7. c. cxxviii	26 July 1901
An Act to enable the Mayor Aldermen and Burgesses of the Borough of Blackpool to construct additional tramways and improvements in that borough and to make further provisions for the improvement and good government of the said borough and for other purposes.
Burton-upon-Trent Corporation Act 1901 or the Burton-on-Trent Corporation Act 1901	1 Edw. 7. c. cxxix	26 July 1901
An Act to alter the numbers and boundaries of the wards of the borough of Burton-upon-Trent and to enable the Mayor Aldermen and Burgesses of the said borough to construct tramways in the borough and to make further provisions for the good government of the borough.
Lancashire and Yorkshire Railway (Dearne Valley Junction Railways) Act 1901	1 Edw. 7. c. cxxx	26 July 1901
An Act for conferring further powers on the Lancashire and Yorkshire Railway Company with respect to the construction of railways in the west riding of the county of York and for other purposes.
Metropolitan Railway Act 1901	1 Edw. 7. c. cxxxi	26 July 1901
An Act to confer further powers upon the Metropolitan Railway Company in relation to their own undertaking and upon that Company and the Harrow and Uxbridge Railway Company in relation to the Harrow and Uxbridge Railway to revive and extend the powers for the purchase of land and the completion of certain authorised railways and works by the two Companies and for other purposes.
Staines Reservoirs (Amendment) Act 1901	1 Edw. 7. c. cxxxii	26 July 1901
An Act to extend the provisions of the Staines Reservoirs Acts of 1896 (Note: Staines Reservoirs, &c. Act 1896 (59 & 60 Vict. c.ccxli)) and 1898 (Note: Staines Reservoirs Act 1898 (61 & 62 Vict. c. civ)) relating to the purchase of the undertakings of certain Metropolitan Water Companies by any public body or trustees.
Belfast Harbour Act 1901	1 Edw. 7. c. cxxxiii	26 July 1901
An Act to amend certain provisions of the Belfast Harbour Act 1898 (Note: Belfast Harbour Act 1898 (61 & 62 Vict. c. cv)) to enable the Belfast Harbour Commissioners to make a new and substituted graving dock to confirm agreements as to lands and works connected therewith and for other purposes.
Dover Gas Act 1901	1 Edw. 7. c. cxxxiv	26 July 1901
An Act for conferring further powers on the Dovor Gas Light Company.
Bolton Corporation Act 1901	1 Edw. 7. c. cxxxv	26 July 1901
An Act to authorise the Mayor Aldermen and Burgesses of the Borough of Bolton to construct additional tramways and to make street improvements and to confer upon them further powers with respect to streets buildings sewers and drains and the health local government and improvement of the borough to borrow additional moneys and for other purposes.
Shannon Water and Electric Power Act 1901	1 Edw. 7. c. cxxxvi	26 July 1901
An Act for incorporating and conferring powers on the Shannon Water and Electric Power Company and for other purposes.
Electric Lighting Order Confirmation (No. 1) Act 1901	1 Edw. 7. c. cxxxvii	26 July 1901
An Act to confirm a Provisional Order made by the Board of Trade under the Electric Lighting Acts 1882 and 1888 relating to St. Marylebone.
	St. Marylebone Electric Lighting Order 1903	
Electric Lighting Orders Confirmation (No. 5) Act 1901	1 Edw. 7. c. cxxxviii	26 July 1901
An Act to confirm certain Provisional Orders made by the Board of Trade under the Electric Lighting Acts 1882 and 1888 relating to Macclesfield Ripon Todmorden Trowbridge Ware Wellingborough (public purposes) Wellington (Salop) Widnes Wisbech and Workington.
	Macclesfield Electric Lighting Order 1901	
	Ripon Electric Lighting Order 1901	
	Todmorden Electric Lighting Order 1901	
	Trowbridge Electric Lighting Order 1901	
	Ware Electric Lighting Order 1901	
	Wellingborough (Public Purposes) Electric Lighting Order 1901	
	Wellington (Salop) Electric Lighting Order 1901	
	Widnes Electric Lighting Order 1901	
	Wisbech Electric Lighting Order 1901	
	Workington Electric Lighting Order 1901	
Electric Lighting Orders Confirmation (No. 6) Act 1901	1 Edw. 7. c. cxxxix	26 July 1901
An Act to confirm certain Provisional Orders made by the Board of Trade under the Electric Lighting Acts 1882 and 1888 relating to Aberavon Ashton-in-Makerfield Hampton Hoddesdon Ince-in-Makerfield Mountain Ash Neath (Rural District) Pontypridd Teddington and Worsley.
	Aberavon Electric Lighting Order 1901	
	Ashton-in-Makerfield Electric Lighting Order 1901	
	Hampton Electric Lighting Order 1901	
	Hoddesdon Electric Lighting Order 1901	
	Ince-in-Makerfield Electric Lighting Order 1901	
	Mountain Ash Electric Lighting Order 1901	
	Neath (Rural District) Electric Lighting Order 1901	
	Pontypridd Electric Lighting Order 1901	
	Teddington Electric Lighting Order 1901	
	Worsley Electric Lighting Order 1901	
Electric Lighting Orders Confirmation (No. 10) Act 1901	1 Edw. 7. c. cxl	26 July 1901
An Act to confirm certain Provisional Orders made by the Board of Trade under the Electric Lighting Acts 1882 and 1888 relating to Blackrock Dungannon Kildare and Waterford.
	Blackrock Electric Lighting Order 1901	
	Dungannon Electric Lighting Order 1901	
	Kildare Electric Lighting Order 1901	
	Waterford Electric Lighting Order 1901	
Local Government Board (Ireland) Provisional Orders Confirmation (No. 3) Act 1901	1 Edw. 7. c. cxli	26 July 1901
An Act to confirm a Provisional Order of the Local Government Board for Ireland under the Local Government (Ireland) (No. 2) Act 1900. (Note: Local Government (Ireland) (No. 2) Act 1900 (63 & 64 Vict. c. 41))
	Local Government (Procedure of Councils) Order 1903	
Local Government Board (Ireland) Provisional Orders Confirmation (No. 4) Act 1901	1 Edw. 7. c. cxlii	26 July 1901
An Act to confirm certain Provisional Orders of the Local Government Board for Ireland relating to the urban districts of Dundalk Enniskillen Sligo and Tralee and the counties of Fermanagh Kerry Louth Sligo and Waterford.
	Dundalk Order 1901	
	Enniskillen Order 1901	
	Sligo Order 1901	
	Tralee Order 1901	
	County of Waterford Order 1901	
Local Government Board (Ireland) Provisional Orders Confirmation (No. 5) Act 1901	1 Edw. 7. c. cxliii	26 July 1901
An Act to confirm certain Provisional Orders of the Local Government Board for Ireland relating to the county borough of Londonderry the rural district of Fermoy and the Skule Bog United District.
	Londonderry Port Sanitary Order 1901	
	Fermoy Rural Order 1901	
	Skule Bog Order 1901	
Local Government Board (Ireland) Provisional Orders Confirmation (Housing of Working Classes) Act 1901	1 Edw. 7. c. cxliv	26 July 1901
An Act to confirm certain Provisional Orders of the Local Government Board for Ireland relating to the urban districts of Cashel Omagh and Strabane.
	Cashel Order 1901	
	Omagh Order 1901	
	Strabane Order 1901	
Local Government Board (Ireland) Provisional Order Confirmation (Housing of Working Classes) (No. 2) Act 1901	1 Edw. 7. c. cxlv	26 July 1901
An Act to confirm a Provisional Order of the Local Government Board for Ireland relating to the city of Dublin.
	Dublin Order 1901	
Local Government Board's Provisional Orders Confirmation (No. 4) Act 1901	1 Edw. 7. c. cxlvi	26 July 1901
An Act to confirm certain Provisional Orders of the Local Government Board relating to Congleton (Rural) Kingsbridge Liverpool Middleton Pudsey and Tamworth.
	Congleton Rural Order 1901	
	Kingsbridge Order 1901	
	Liverpool Order (No. 1) 1901	
	Middleton Order (No. 1) 1901	
	Pudsey Order 1901	
	Tamworth Order 1901	
Local Government Board's Provisional Orders Confirmation (No. 5) Act 1901	1 Edw. 7. c. cxlvii	26 July 1901
An Act to confirm certain Provisional Orders of the Local Government Board relating to Halifax and Sowerby Bridge Lytham Middleton Newark Ripon and Torquay.
	Halifax and Sowerby Bridge Order 1901	
	Lytham Order 1901	
	Middleton Order (No. 2) 1901	
	Newark Order 1901	
	Ripon Order 1901	
	Torquay Order 1901	
Local Government Board's Provisional Orders Confirmation (No. 6) Act 1901	1 Edw. 7. c. cxlviii	26 July 1901
An Act to confirm certain Provisional Orders of the Local Government Board relating to Bridport Chopping Wycombe Marlborough Wakefield and the county of West Sussex.
	Bridport (Extension) Order 1901	
	Chepping Wycombe (Extension) Order 1901	
	Marlborough Order 1901	
	Wakefield Order 1901	
	West Sussex Order 1901	
Local Government Board's Provisional Orders Confirmation (No. 8) Act 1901	1 Edw. 7. c. cxlix	26 July 1901
An Act to confirm certain Provisional Orders of the Local Government Board relating to the Nantwich the Ormskirk Lathom and Burscough and the Orsett Joint Hospital Districts.
	Nantwich Joint Hospital Order 1901	
	Ormskirk Lathom and Burscough Joint Hospital Order 1901	
	Orsett Joint Hospital Order 1901	
Local Government Board's Provisional Orders Confirmation (No. 9) Act 1901	1 Edw. 7. c. cl	26 July 1901
An Act to confirm certain Provisional Orders of the Local Government Board relating to Bristol Chiswick Doncaster (Rural) Dover Hailsham (Rural) and Tavistock (Rural).
	Bristol Order 1901	
	Chiswick Order 1901	
	Doncaster Order 1901	
	Dover Order 1901	
	Hailsham Rural Order 1901	
	Tavistock Rural Order 1901	
Local Government Board's Provisional Orders Confirmation (No. 10) Act 1901	1 Edw. 7. c. cli	26 July 1901
An Act to confirm certain Provisional Orders of the Local Government Board relating to the Hitchin the Maldon and the Upton-upon-Severn and Pershore Joint Hospital Districts.
	Hitchin Joint Hospital Order 1901	
	Maldon Joint Hospital Order 1901	
	Upton-upon-Severn and Pershore Joint Hospital District Order 1901	
Local Government Board's Provisional Orders Confirmation (No. 12) Act 1901	1 Edw. 7. c. clii	26 July 1901
An Act to confirm certain provisional Orders of the Local Government Board relating to Liverpool (two) and West Ham.
	Liverpool Order (No. 2) 1901	
	Liverpool Order (No. 3) 1901	
	West Ham Order 1901	
Local Government Board's Provisional Orders Confirmation (Housing of Working Classes) Act 1901 (repealed)	1 Edw. 7. c. cliii	26 July 1901
An Act to confirm certain Provisional Orders of the Local Government Board relating to Birkenhead and Prescot. (Repealed by County of Merseyside Act 1980 (c. x))
Gas and Water Orders Confirmation Act 1901	1 Edw. 7. c. cliv	26 July 1901
An Act to confirm certain Provisional Orders made by the Board of Trade under the authority of the Gas and Water Works Facilities Act 1870 relating to Bexhill water and gas High Wycombe gas Portsea gas Slough gas and Woking District gas.
	Bexhill Water and Gas Order 1901	
	High Wycombe Gas Order 1901	
	Portsea Gas Order 1901	
	Slough Gas Order 1901	
	Woking District Gas Order 1901	
Gas Orders Confirmation Act 1901	1 Edw. 7. c. clv	26 July 1901
An Act to confirm certain Provisional Orders made by the Board of Trade under the authority of the Gas and Water Works Facilities Act 1870 relating to Horsham gas Nuneaton gas Pinner gas and Swaftham gas.
	Horsham Gas Order 1901	
	Nuneaton Gas Order 1901	
	Pinner Gas Order 1901	
	Swaffham Gas Order 1901	
Metropolitan Police Provisional Order Confirmation Act 1901 (repealed)	1 Edw. 7. c. clvi	26 July 1901
An Act to confirm a Provisional Order made by one of His Majesty’s Principal Secretaries of State under the Metropolitan Police Act 1886 (Note: Metropolitan Police Act 1886 (49 & 50 Vict. c. 22)) and the Metropolitan Police Courts Act 1897 (Note: Metropolitan Police Courts Act 1897 (60 & 61 Vict. c. 26)) relating to lands in the parishes of Erith Banstead St. John Horsleydown St. Leonard Shoreditch Clapham and Greenwich. (Repealed by Statute Law (Repeals) Act 2008 (c. 12))
Military Lands Provisional Orders Confirmation (No. 2) Act 1901 (repealed)	1 Edw. 7. c. clvii	26 July 1901
An Act to confirm certain Provisional Orders of the Secretary of State under the Military Lands Act 1892. (Repealed by Statute Law (Repeals) Act 2008 (c. 12))
Ayr County Buildings Order Confirmation Act 1901	1 Edw. 7. c. clviii	26 July 1901
An Act to confirm a Provisional Order under the Private Legislation Procedure (Scotland) Act 1899 relating to the Ayr County Buildings.
	Ayr County Buildings Order 1901	
Pier and Harbour Orders Confirmation (No. 2) Act 1901	1 Edw. 7. c. clix	26 July 1901
An Act to confirm certain Provisional Orders made by the Board of Trade under the General Pier and Harbour Act 1861 relating to Babbacombe and Great Yarmouth.
	Babbacombe Pier Order 1901	
	Great Yarmouth Wellington Pier Order 1901	
Naval Works Provisional Order Confirmation Act 1901 (repealed)	1 Edw. 7. c. clx	26 July 1901
An Act to confirm a Provisional Order of the Admiralty under the Naval Works Act 1895. (Note: Naval Works Act 1895 (58 & 59 Vict. c. 35)) (Repealed by Statute Law (Repeals) Act 2008 (c. 12))
Dundee Corporation Order Confirmation Act 1901 (repealed)	1 Edw. 7. c. clxi	26 July 1901
An Act to confirm a Provisional Order under the Private Legislation Procedure (Scotland) Act 1899 relating to Dundee Corporation. (Repealed by North of Scotland Electricity Order Confirmation Act 1958 (7 & 8 Eliz. 2. c. ii))
	Dundee Corporation Order 1901	
Invergarry and Fort Augustus Railway Order Confirmation Act 1901	1 Edw. 7. c. clxii	26 July 1901
An Act to confirm a Provisional Order under the Private Legislation Procedure (Scotland) Act 1899 relating to the Invergarry and Fort Augustus Railway.
	Invergarry and Fort Augustus Railway Order 1901	
Glasgow Corporation (Police) Order Confirmation Act 1901 (repealed)	1 Edw. 7. c. clxiii	26 July 1901
An Act to confirm a Provisional Order under the Private Legislation Procedure (Scotland) Act 1899 relating to Glasgow Corporation Police. (Repealed by Statute Law (Repeals) Act 1995 (c. 44))
	Glasgow Corporation (Police) Order 1901	
Water Orders Confirmation (No. 1) Act 1901	1 Edw. 7. c. clxiv	26 July 1901
An Act to confirm certain Provisional Orders made by the Board of Trade under the Gas and Water Works Facilities Act 1870 relating to Frimley and Farnborough District Water Henley-on-Thames Water Hungerford Water South Staffordshire Water and Wokingham Water.
	Frimley and Farnborough District Water Order 1901	
	Henley-on-Thames Water Order 1901	
	Hungerford Water Order 1901	
	South Staffordshire Waterworks Order 1901	
	Wokingham District Water Order 1901	
Water Orders Confirmation (No. 2) Act 1901	1 Edw. 7. c. clxv	26 July 1901
An Act to confirm certain Provisional Orders made by the Board of Trade under the Gas and Water Works Facilities Act 1870 relating to Dearne Valley Water Mid-Kent Water Perranporth Water Slough Water and Tilehurst Pangbourne and District Water.
	Dearne Valley Water Order 1901	
	Mid-Kent Water Order 1901	
	Perranporth Water Order 1901	
	Slough Water Order 1901	
	Tilehurst Pangbourne and District Water Order 1901	
Clydebank Burgh Tramways Order Confirmation Act 1901 (repealed)	1 Edw. 7. c. clxvi	26 July 1901
An Act to confirm a Provisional Order under the Private Legislation Procedure (Scotland) Act 1899 relating to Clydebank Burgh Tramways. (Repealed by Glasgow Corporation Consolidation (Water, Transport and Markets) Order Confirmation Act 1964 (c. xliii))
	Clydebank Burgh Tramways Order 1901	
Edinburgh and District Water Order Confirmation Act 1901 (repealed)	1 Edw. 7. c. clxvii	26 July 1901
An Act to confirm a Provisional Order under the Private Legislation Procedure (Scotland) Act 1899 relating to Edinburgh and District Water. (Repealed by Edinburgh Corporation Water Order Confirmation Act 1924 (14 & 15 Geo. 5. c. lxxxvi))
	Edinburgh and District Water Order 1901	
Local Government Board's Provisional Orders Confirmation (No. 7) Act 1901	1 Edw. 7. c. clxviii	9 August 1901
An Act to confirm certain Provisional Orders of the Local Government Board relating to Bournemouth Ludlow and South Shields.
	Bournemouth (Extension) Order 1901	
	Ludlow (Extension) Order 1901	
	South Shields (Extension) Order 1901	
Local Government Board's Provisional Order Confirmation (No. 11) Act 1901	1 Edw. 7. c. clxix	9 August 1901
An Act to confirm a Provisional Order of the Local Government Board relating to Stockport.
	Stockport (Extension) Order 1901	
Local Government Board's Provisional Order Confirmation (Port) Act 1901	1 Edw. 7. c. clxx	9 August 1901
An Act to confirm a Provisional Order of the Local Government Board relating to the Port of Manchester.
	Manchester Port Order 1901	
Local Government Board's Provisional Orders Confirmation (Housing of Working Classes) (No. 2) Act 1901	1 Edw. 7. c. clxxi	9 August 1901
An Act to confirm certain Provisional Orders of the Local Government Board relating to Leeds and Lichfield.
	Leeds Order 1901	
	Lichfield Order 1901	
Kirkcaldy and Dysart Water Order Confirmation Act 1901 (repealed)	1 Edw. 7. c. clxxii	9 August 1901
An Act to confirm a Provisional Order under the Private Legislation Procedure (Scotland) Act 1899 relating to Kirkcaldy and Dysart water. (Repealed by Kirkcaldy Corporation Order Confirmation Act 1939 (2 & 3 Geo. 6. c. vi))
	Kirkcaldy and Dysart Water Order 1901	
Education Board Provisional Orders Confirmation (Barnes, &c.) Act 1901	1 Edw. 7. c. clxxiii	9 August 1901
An Act to confirm certain Provisional Orders made by the Board of Education under the Elementary Education Acts 1870 to 1900 to enable the School Boards for Barnes Hartlepool Manchester Merthyr Tydfil and Walthamstow to put in force the Lands Clauses Acts.
	Barnes Order 1901	
	Hartlepool Order 1901	
	Manchester Order 1901	
	Merthyr Tydfil Order 1901	
	Walthamstow Order 1901	
Electric Lighting Orders Confirmation (No. 7) Act 1901	1 Edw. 7. c. clxxiv	9 August 1901
An Act to confirm certain Provisional Orders made by the Board of Trade under the Electric Lighting Acts 1882 and 1888 relating to Barry Crompton Foots Cray Friern Barnet Isle of Thanet (Rural) Newbury Pudsey Ross Roundhay and Royton.
	Barry Electric Lighting Order 1901	
	Crompton Electric Lighting Order 1901	
	Foots Cray Electric Lighting Order 1901	
	Friern Barnet Electric Lighting Order 1901	
	Isle of Thanet Electric Lighting Order 1901	
	Newbury Electric Lighting Order 1901	
	Pudsey Electric Lighting Order 1901	
	Ross Electric Lighting Order 1901	
	Roundhay Electric Lighting Order 1901	
	Royton Electric Lighting Order 1901	
Electric Lighting Orders Confirmation (No. 8) Act 1901 (repealed)	1 Edw. 7. c. clxxv	9 August 1901
An Act to confirm certain Provisional Orders made by the Board of Trade under the Electric Lighting Acts 1882 and 1888 and the Electric Lighting (Scotland) Act 1890 (Note: Electric Lighting (Scotland) Act 1890 (53 & 54 Vict. c. 13)) relating to Clydebank Crieff Dalkeith Dollar Falkirk Galashiels Gourock Jedburgh Melrose and Oban. (Repealed by North of Scotland Electricity Order Confirmation Act 1958 (7 & 8 Eliz. 2. c. ii))
Electric Lighting Orders Confirmation (No. 9) Act 1901	1 Edw. 7. c. clxxvi	9 August 1901
An Act to confirm certain Provisional Orders made by the Board of Trade under the Electric Lighting Acts 1882 and 1888 relating to Alnwick Annfield Plain Benfieldside Consett Handsworth Norton Pickering St. Austell Shildon and East Thickley and Whitley and Monkseaton.
	Alnwick Electric Lighting Order 1901	
	Annfield Plain Electric Lighting Order 1901	
	Benfieldside Electric Lighting Order 1901	
	Consett Electric Lighting Order 1901	
	Handsworth Electric Lighting Order 1901	
	Norton Electric Lighting Order 1901	
	Pickering Electric Lighting Order 1901	
	St. Austell Electric Lighting Order 1901	
	Shildon Electric Lighting Order 1901	
	Whitley and Monkseaton Electric Lighting Order 1901	
Electric Lighting Orders Confirmation (No. 11) Act 1901	1 Edw. 7. c. clxxvii	9 August 1901
An Act to confirm certain Provisional Orders made by the Board of Trade under the Electric Lighting Acts 1882 and 1888 relating to Bromsgrove Goole Ilkley Lyndhurst the extension of the area of supply of the Midland Electric Corporation for Power Distribution (Limited) Northwood and Ruislip Rickmansworth Rishton Great Harwood and Clayton-le-Moors and Warwick.
	Bromsgrove Electric Lighting Order 1901	
	Goole Electric Lighting Order 1901	
	Ilkley Electric Lighting Order 1901	
	Lyndhurst Electric Lighting Order 1901	
	Midland Electric Power Distribution Electric Lighting Order 1901	
	Northwood and Ruislip Electric Lighting Order 1901	
	Rickmansworth Electric Lighting Order 1901	
	Rishton, Gt. Harwood and Clayton-le-Moors Electric Lighting Order 1901	
	Warwick Electric Lighting Order 1901	
Electric Lighting Orders Confirmation (No. 12) Act 1901	1 Edw. 7. c. clxxviii	9 August 1901
An Act to confirm certain Provisional Orders made by the Board of Trade under the Electric Lighting Acts 1882 and 1888 relating to Lewisham and Penge.
	Lewisham Electric Lighting Order 1901	
	Penge Electric Lighting Order 1901	
Glasgow Corporation (Tramways and General) Order Confirmation Act 1901	1 Edw. 7. c. clxxix	9 August 1901
An Act to confirm a Provisional Order under the Private Legislation Procedure (Scotland) Act 1899 relating to Glasgow Corporation (Tramways and General).
	Glasgow Corporation (Tramways and General) Order 1901	
Pier and Harbour Orders Confirmation (No. 3) Act 1901	1 Edw. 7. c. clxxx	9 August 1901
An Act to confirm certain Provisional Orders made by the Board of Trade under the General Pier and Harbour Act 1861 relating to Bexhill Burghead Carradale Elgin and Lossiemouth and Urr Navigation.
	Bexhill Pier Order 1901	
	Burghead Harbour Order 1901	
	Carradale Pier Order 1901	
	Elgin and Lossiemouth Harbour Order 1901	
	Lossiemouth Harbour Order 1901	
	Urr Navigation Order 1901	
Tramways Orders Confirmation (No. 2) Act 1901	1 Edw. 7. c. clxxxi	9 August 1901
An Act to confirm certain Provisional Orders made by the Board of Trade under the Tramways Act 1870 (Note: Tramways Act 1870 (33 & 34 Vict. c. 78)) relating to Birkdale Urban District Council Tramways Crompton Urban District Council Tramways Leamington Tramways Royton Urban District Council Tramways Swindon Corporation Tramways and Wrexham District Tramways.
	Birkdale Urban District Council Tramways Order 1901	
	Crompton Urban District Council Tramways Order 1901	
	Leamington Tramways Order 1901	
	Royton Urban District Council Tramways Order 1901	
	Swindon Corporation Tramways Order 1901	
	Wrexham District Tramways Order 1901	
Tramways Orders Confirmation (No. 3) Act 1901	1 Edw. 7. c. clxxxii	9 August 1901
An Act to confirm certain Provisional Orders made by the Board of Trade under the Tramways Act 1870 relating to Cheriton Urban District Council Tramways Colchester Corporation Tramways Hyde Corporation Tramway Littleborough Urban District Council Tramways and Middleton and Chadderton (Local Authorities) Tramway.
	Cheriton Urban District Council Tramways Order 1901	
	Colchester Corporation Tramways Order 1901	
	Hyde Corporation Tramway Order 1901	
	Littleborough Urban District Council Tramways Order 1901	
	Middleton and Chadderton (Local Authorities) Tramway Order 1901	
Tramways Orders Confirmation (No. 4) Act 1901	1 Edw. 7. c. clxxxiii	9 August 1901
An Act to confirm certain Provisional Orders made by the Board of Trade under the Tramways Act 1870 relating to Coatbridge Tramways Folkestone Corporation Tramways Glossop Electric Tramways Hopeman Tramway Weston-super-Mare Tramways and West Riding Tramways.
	Coatbridge Tramways Order 1901	
	Folkestone Corporation Tramways Order 1901	
	Glossop Electric Tramways Order 1901	
	Hopeman Tramway Order 1901	
	Weston-super-Mare Tramways Order 1901	
	West Riding Tramways Order 1901	
Edinburgh Corporation Order Confirmation Act 1901 (repealed)	1 Edw. 7. c. clxxxiv	9 August 1901
An Act to confirm a Provisional Order under the Private Legislation Procedure (Scotland) Act 1899 relating to Edinburgh Corporation. (Repealed by Edinburgh Corporation Order Confirmation Act 1933 (24 & 25 Geo. 5. c. v))
	Edinburgh Corporation Order 1901	
Stirling Corporation Order Confirmation Act 1901	1 Edw. 7. c. clxxxv	9 August 1901
An Act to confirm a Provisional Order under the Private Legislation Procedure (Scotland) Act 1899 relating to Stirling Corporation.
	Stirling Corporation Order 1901	
Kilmarnock Corporation Order Confirmation Act 1901	1 Edw. 7. c. clxxxvi	9 August 1901
An Act to confirm a Provisional Order under the Private Legislation Procedure (Scotland) Act 1899 relating to Kilmarnock Corporation.
	Kilmarnock Corporation Order 1901	
Wigan Corporation Act 1901	1 Edw. 7. c. clxxxvii	9 August 1901
An Act to confer further powers upon the Mayor Aldermen and Burgesses of the Borough of Wigan in regard to the construction of tramways and street improvements and in regard to their electric lighting undertaking and for other purposes.
North British Railway Act 1901	1 Edw. 7. c. clxxxviii	9 August 1901
An Act to confer further powers on the North British Railway Company in connection with their undertaking to authorise the widening of portions of their Monkland Railway and the construction of new railways to authorise the said Company to acquire additional lands and for other purposes.
South Metropolitan Gas Act 1901	1 Edw. 7. c. clxxxix	9 August 1901
An Act to empower the South Metropolitan Gas Company to raise additional capital and to purchase by agreement so much of the southern portion of the undertaking of the Gas Light and Coke Company as is situate in the county of London south of the Thames and for other purposes.
Leeds Churches Act 1901	1 Edw. 7. c. cxc	9 August 1901
An Act to authorise the sale of certain churches vicarage houses and schools in the City of Leeds and the application of the proceeds of sale to Church purposes within the said city to provide for the alteration of ecclesiastical parishes or districts in the said city and for other purposes.
Worcester Tramways Act 1901	1 Edw. 7. c. cxci	9 August 1901
An Act for empowering the Worcester Tramways Limited to construct new tramways in lieu of their existing tramways and to work the same by mechanical power and for other purposes.
Chester Corporation Act 1901 (repealed)	1 Edw. 7. c. cxcii	9 August 1901
An Act to confer powers on the Corporation of Chester to reconstruct the existing tramways in the City of Chester to construct additional tramways in and adjacent to the city to work tramways and for other purposes. (Repealed by Cheshire County Council Act 1980 (c. xiii))
Manchester Corporation Act 1901	1 Edw. 7. c. cxciii	9 August 1901
An Act to confer further powers upon the Lord Mayor Aldermen and Citizens of the City of Manchester with reference to the construction of tramways and streets and the acquisition and appropriation of lands and with respect to children trading in the streets and other matters affecting the health and good government of the city and for other purposes.
Long Eaton Gas Act 1901	1 Edw. 7. c. cxciv	9 August 1901
An Act for incorporating and conferring powers on the Long Eaton Gas Company.
Stalybridge, Hyde, Mossley and Dukinfield Tramway and Electricity Board Act 1901	1 Edw. 7. c. cxcv	9 August 1901
An Act to constitute and incorporate a joint board consisting of representatives of the Corporations of Stalybridge Hyde Mossley and Dukinfield and to authorise the board to construct and work tramways and to supply electrical energy within the boroughs of Stalybridge Hyde Mossley and Dukinfield and for other purposes.
Wells Corporation Water Act 1901	1 Edw. 7. c. cxcvi	9 August 1901
An Act to authorise the Mayor Aldermen and Citizens of the City of Wells to purchase the undertaking of the Wells Water Company Limited to construct additional waterworks and to supply water within their city and the neighbourhood thereof and for other purposes.
Albion Steam Coal Company Act 1901	1 Edw. 7. c. cxcvii	9 August 1901
An Act to provide for a re-arrangement of the share capital of the Albion Steam Coal Company Limited and for other purposes.
Stockport Corporation Water Act 1901 (repealed)	1 Edw. 7. c. cxcviii	9 August 1901
An Act to empower the Mayor Aldermen and Burgesses of the County Borough of Stockport to construct additional waterworks and for other purposes. (Repealed by Manchester Water (No. 3) Order 1961 (SI 1961/654))
Bridewell Hospital Act 1901	1 Edw. 7. c. cxcix	9 August 1901
An Act for extending and amending the leasing powers of the Mayor and Commonalty and Citizens of the City of London Governors of the possessions revenues and goods of the Hospital of King Edward the Sixth called Bridewell and for conferring on them other powers for the management and development of their estates and for confirming certain leases granted by them.
Freshwater, Yarmouth and Newport Railway Act 1901	1 Edw. 7. c. cc	9 August 1901
An Act to empower the Freshwater Yarmouth and Newport Railway Company to capitalise interest in arrear on Debenture Stocks and for other purposes.
Bradford Corporation Act 1901	1 Edw. 7. c. cci	9 August 1901
An Act to authorise the Mayor Aldermen and Citizens of the City of Bradford in the West Riding of the County of York to construct additional tramways and street improvements and to extend their gas works and to make further provision for the health and good government of the city and for other purposes.
Humber Commercial Railway and Dock Act 1901	1 Edw. 7. c. ccii	9 August 1901
An Act for authorising the construction of a dock sea walls railways and other works adjoining the existing docks at Grimsby in the County of Lincoln to be called the Humber Commercial Railway and Dock and for other purposes.
London, Tilbury and Southend Railway Act 1901	1 Edw. 7. c. cciii	9 August 1901
An Act to confer further powers upon the London Tilbury and Southend Railway Company and for other purposes.
Paisley Police and Public Health Act 1901	1 Edw. 7. c. cciv	9 August 1901
An Act to confer further powers on the Corporation of Paisley and to make further provision for the regulation of streets and buildings and the police and public health administration of the burgh and for other purposes.
Central London Railway Act 1901	1 Edw. 7. c. ccv	9 August 1901
An Act to amend section four of the Central London Railway Act 1899 (Note: Central London Railway Act 1899 (62 & 63 Vict. c. clxxxv)) and to authorise the raising of further capital and for other purposes.
Dover Harbour Act 1901 (repealed)	1 Edw. 7. c. ccvi	9 August 1901
An Act to authorise the construction of certain new works for improving the Harbour of Dover the abandonment of certain authorised works the raising of further moneys by the Dover Harbour Board and for other purposes. (Repealed by Dover Harbour Consolidation Act 1954 (2 & 3 Eliz. 2. c. iv))
South Essex Waterworks Act 1901	1 Edw. 7. c. ccvii	9 August 1901
An Act to authorise the South Essex Waterworks Company to construct further works to extend their limits of supply and for other purposes.
Great Southern and Western Railway Act 1901	1 Edw. 7. c. ccviii	9 August 1901
An Act to enable the Great Southern and Western Railway Company to make an extension railway to Cashel and a branch railway to the Curragh Siding to execute certain other works to acquire additional lands to transfer to and vest in the Company the undertakings of the Limerick and Kerry Railway Company and of the Rathkeale and Newcastle Junction Railway Company to raise additional capital and for other purposes.
Bournemouth Corporation Act 1901 (repealed)	1 Edw. 7. c. ccix	9 August 1901
An Act to enable the Mayor Aldermen and Burgesses of the County Borough of Bournemouth to construct tramways within and beyond the borough to make certain street widenings and for other purposes. (Repealed by Bournemouth Borough Council Act 1985 (c. v))
Broadstairs and St. Peter's Water and Improvement Act 1901 (repealed)	1 Edw. 7. c. ccx	9 August 1901
An Act to authorise the Urban District Council of Broadstairs and St. Peter’s in the county of Kent to purchase the undertaking of the Broadstairs Waterworks Company and to construct additional waterworks for the supply of their district and the parish of St. Peter Extra and to make further and better provision for the improvement health local government and finance of the district and for other purposes. (Repealed by County of Kent Act 1981 (c. xviii))
Golborne Gas Act 1901	1 Edw. 7. c. ccxi	9 August 1901
An Act for incorporating and conferring powers on the Golborne Gas Company.
Taff Vale Railway Act 1901	1 Edw. 7. c. ccxii	9 August 1901
An Act to enlarge the powers of the Taff Vale Railway Company with reference to the acquisition of lands and the construction of works and for other purposes.
Christ's Hospital (London) Act 1901	1 Edw. 7. c. ccxiii	9 August 1901
An Act to authorise the sale and disposal of the site of Christ's Hospital in the city of London.
Doncaster Tithe Trust Act 1901	1 Edw. 7. c. ccxiv	9 August 1901
An Act to confirm an agreement between the Ecclesiastical Commissioners and the lessees of the parsonage of Doncaster and certain other hereditaments comprised in an indenture of lease dated the 2nd day of June 1847 and to provide for the winding up of certain trusts connected therewith which were created by the Doncaster Tithe Deed of 1821 and for other purposes.
Harrogate Water Act 1901	1 Edw. 7. c. ccxv	9 August 1901
An Act to authorise the Corporation of Harrogate to construct additional waterworks and for other purposes.
Newport (Isle of Wight) Gas Act 1901 (repealed)	1 Edw. 7. c. ccxvi	9 August 1901
An Act to extend the limits of supply of and to confer further powers upon the Newport (Isle of Wight) Gas Company and for other purposes. (Repealed by Newport (Isle of Wight) Corporation Act 1946 (9 & 10 Geo. 6. c. xxi))
Elland Gas Act 1901	1 Edw. 7. c. ccxvii	9 August 1901
An Act to extend the powers of the Elland-cum-Greetland Gas Company to amend the Acts relating to that Company and for other purposes.
Barrow-in-Furness Corporation Act 1901	1 Edw. 7. c. ccxviii	9 August 1901
An Act to empower the Corporation of Barrow-in-Furness to make additional waterworks to make certain street works and to make better provision for the health local government and improvement of the borough and for other purposes.
Dublin, Rathmines and Rathgar and Pembroke (Equalisation of Rates) Act 1901	1 Edw. 7. c. ccxix	9 August 1901
An Act to make provision for the equalisation of rates as between the City of Dublin and the Urban Districts of Rathmines and Rathgar and of Pembroke adjoining the said city.
Metropolitan District Railway Act 1901	1 Edw. 7. c. ccxx	9 August 1901
An Act to empower the Metropolitan District Railway Company to provide for the conversion and adaptation of their railways for being worked by electrical power and for other purposes.
Arlesey Gas Act 1901 (repealed)	1 Edw. 7. c. ccxxi	9 August 1901
An Act for supplying with gas the parish of Arlesey and other places in the county of Bedford. (Repealed by Biggleswade and District Gas Order 1925 (SR&O 1925/297))
Salford Corporation Act 1901	1 Edw. 7. c. ccxxii	9 August 1901
An Act to enable the Mayor Aldermen and Burgesses of the Borough of Salford to obtain from the Lord Mayor Aldermen and Citizens of the City of Manchester a further supply of water in bulk for the township of Salford.
Blackburn Corporation Act 1901	1 Edw. 7. c. ccxxiii	9 August 1901
An Act for extending the boundaries of the County Borough of Blackburn and to authorise the Corporation of that borough to reconstruct tramways and to construct new tramways in the borough to make street works to enlarge the town hall and erect an assembly room to erect a new sessions house police and fire brigade stations to borrow money and for other purposes.
Brighton Corporation Act 1901 (repealed)	1 Edw. 7. c. ccxxiv	9 August 1901
An Act to empower the Mayor Aldermen and Burgesses of the County Borough of Brighton to purchase the Brighton Aquarium and for other purposes. (Repealed by Brighton Corporation Act 1931 (21 & 22 Geo. 5. c. cix))
Clyde Valley Electrical Power Act 1901 (repealed)	1 Edw. 7. c. ccxxv	9 August 1901
An Act for incorporating and conferring powers on the Clyde Valley Electrical Power Company. (Repealed by South of Scotland Electricity Order Confirmation Act 1956 (4 & 5 Eliz. 2. c. xciv))
Glasgow and South Western Railway Act 1901	1 Edw. 7. c. ccxxvi	9 August 1901
An Act for conferring further powers on the Glasgow and South Western Railway Company for the construction of works and the acquisition of lands and for the purchase of Troon Harbour for empowering them to raise additional capital and for other purposes.
London and India Docks Company (New Works) Act 1901	1 Edw. 7. c. ccxxvii	9 August 1901
An Act to authorise the London and India Docks Company to construct a new dock and other works and for other purposes.
Metropolitan Electric Supply Company Act 1901	1 Edw. 7. c. ccxxviii	9 August 1901
An Act to confer further powers on the Metropolitan Electric Supply Company Limited with respect to the supply of electrical energy and for other purposes.
Rhyl Improvement Act 1901	1 Edw. 7. c. ccxxix	9 August 1901
An Act to authorise the Urban District Council of Rhyl to construct additional waterworks and to make further provision in regard to the health local government improvement and finance of the urban district and for other purposes.
Shireoaks, Laughton and Maltby Railway Act 1901	1 Edw. 7. c. ccxxx	9 August 1901
An Act for making a railway in the West Riding of the county of York from the Great Central Railway at Shireoaks to Maltby and for other purposes.
City of Birmingham Tramways Act 1901	1 Edw. 7. c. ccxxxi	9 August 1901
An Act for authorising the City of Birmingham Tramways Company Limited to construct additional tramways and for other purposes.
Shipley Improvement Act 1901	1 Edw. 7. c. ccxxxii	9 August 1901
An Act to confirm the purchase of the undertaking of the Shipley Gaslight Company by the Urban District Council of Shipley to authorise the construction of tramways cold air stores and street improvements to make further provision with regard to the water and electric light undertakings of the Council and the health and local government of the district.
Biggleswade Water Act 1901	1 Edw. 7. c. ccxxxiii	9 August 1901
An Act to constitute a joint board representative of the Biggleswade Urban and Rural District Councils with power to construct waterworks and to make provision for the supply of water within the districts of those Councils and for other purposes.
Bethlem Hospital Act 1901	1 Edw. 7. c. ccxxxiv	9 August 1901
An Act for extending and amending the leasing powers of the Mayor and Commonalty and Citizens of the City of London as masters guardians and governors of the house and hospital called Bethlem and for conferring on them other powers for the management and development of their estates and for confirming certain leases granted by them.
Easton and Church Hope Railway Act 1901	1 Edw. 7. c. ccxxxv	9 August 1901
An Act to confer further powers on the Easton and Church Hope Railway Company.
Heywood and Middleton Water Board Act 1901	1 Edw. 7. c. ccxxxvi	9 August 1901
An Act to empower the Heywood and Middleton Water Board to construct additional waterworks to repeal and amend enactments relating to the water undertaking of the Board and for other purposes.
South Eastern and London, Chatham and Dover Railways Act 1901	1 Edw. 7. c. ccxxxvii	9 August 1901
An Act to enable the South Eastern Railway Company to make new works to acquire additional lands to provide for the application of capital of the South Eastern and London Chatham and Dover Railway Companies to make further provisions as to the managing committee of those companies and for other purposes.
Tyneside Tramways and Tramroad Act 1901	1 Edw. 7. c. ccxxxviii	9 August 1901
An Act to authorise the construction of tramways and a tramroad in the urban districts of Walker Wallsend Willington Quay and Gosforth the borough of Tynemouth and the parishes of Willington and Longbenton in the county of Northumberland and for other purposes.
Cardiff Railway Act 1901	1 Edw. 7. c. ccxxxix	9 August 1901
An Act for extending the time limited for acquisition of land and completion of works under the Cardiff Railway Acts 1897 (Note: Cardiff Railway Act 1897 (60 & 61 Vict. c. ccvii)) 1898 (Note: Cardiff Railway Act 1898 (61 & 62 Vict. c. cclxii)) and 1899 (Note: Cardiff Railway Act 1899 (62 & 63 Vict. c. lxi)) for sanctioning an alteration of the levels of Railway No. 4 authorised by the Cardiff Railway Act 1897 for further empowering the trustees of the will of the second Marquess of Bute to hold ordinary shares or stock in the capital of the Cardiff Railway Company and for other purposes.
Cork Blackrock and Passage Railway Act 1901	1 Edw. 7. c. ccxl	9 August 1901
An Act to enable the Cork Blackrock and Passage Railway Company to raise additional money to confer further powers on them in relation to their undertaking and for other purposes.
South Staffordshire Mond Gas (Power and Heating) Company's Act 1901	1 Edw. 7. c. ccxli	9 August 1901
An Act to incorporate and confer powers on the South Staffordshire Mond Gas (Power and Heating) Company and for other purposes.
Cromer Water Act 1901	1 Edw. 7. c. ccxlii	9 August 1901
An Act for incorporating and conferring powers on the Cromer Water Company and to empower the Cromer Urban District Council to acquire the undertaking of that Company and for other purposes.
Dover Corporation Act 1901	1 Edw. 7. c. ccxliii	9 August 1901
An Act to empower the Corporation of Dover to make certain new streets to lay down a tramway and to confer further powers on the Corporation in regard to the health local government and improvement of the borough and for other purposes.
Smethwick Corporation Act 1901 (repealed)	1 Edw. 7. c. ccxliv	9 August 1901
An Act to confer powers upon the Corporation of the Borough of Smethwick with respect to tramways and to their electric lighting and other undertakings to make further provision for the improvement and good government of the borough and for other purposes. (Repealed by West Midlands County Council Act 1980 (c. xi))
Lowestoft Corporation Act 1901	1 Edw. 7. c. ccxlv	9 August 1901
An Act to empower the Corporation of Lowestoft to construct and work tramways and to construct street improvements and to make further provision in regard to the electric lighting undertaking of the Corporation and in regard to the seashore and recreation grounds in the borough the lands known as Lamp Lands and the health local government and improvement of the borough and for other purposes.
Ripon Corporation Act 1901 (repealed)	1 Edw. 7. c. ccxlvi	9 August 1901
An Act to authorise the Corporation of the City of Ripon to construct additional waterworks and to make other provision for the health and good government of the city. (Repealed by Harrogate Stray Act 1985 (c. xxii))
Harpenden District Gas Act 1901	1 Edw. 7. c. ccxlvii	9 August 1901
An Act to dissolve the Harpenden Gas Light and Coke Company Limited and to incorporate and confer powers upon the Harpenden District Gas Company and for other purposes.
Southport Water (Transfer) Act 1901	1 Edw. 7. c. ccxlviii	9 August 1901
An Act to constitute and incorporate a Joint Water Board consisting of representatives from the Councils of the borough of Southport the urban district of Birkdale and the rural district of West Lancashire all in the County Palatine of Lancaster and to transfer to and vest in such Board the undertaking of the Southport Waterworks Company and for other purposes.
Aldeburgh Corporation (Water) Act 1901	1 Edw. 7. c. ccxlix	17 August 1901
An Act to enable the Mayor Aldermen and Burgesses of the Borough of Aldeburgh to acquire the undertaking of the Aldeburgh Waterworks Company Limited and to construct waterworks and supply water and for other purposes.
Ilkeston and Heanor Water Act 1901	1 Edw. 7. c. ccl	17 August 1901
An Act to constitute a Joint Board representative of the Corporation of Ilkeston and the Heanor Urban District Council with power to acquire the undertaking of the Meerbrook Sough Company and to construct works for intercepting and distributing the waters of the Meerbrook Sough and for other purposes.
West Cumberland Electric Tramways Act 1901	1 Edw. 7. c. ccli	17 August 1901
An Act to incorporate the West Cumberland Electric Tramways Company and to empower that Company to make tramways tramroads and street improvements and to erect generating stations and to supply electricity and for other purposes.
Midland Counties Junction Railways (Sale) Act 1901	1 Edw. 7. c. cclii	17 August 1901
An Act to make certain provision with reference to the undertakings of the East and West Junction the Evesham Redditch and Stratford-upon-Avon Junction and the Stratford-upon-Avon Towcester and Midland Junction Railway Companies.
Swansea Harbour Act 1901	1 Edw. 7. c. ccliii	17 August 1901
An Act to authorise the Swansea Harbour Trustees to make a new dock enlarge and extend the half-tide basin of the South Dock and construct new railways to extend the limits of the harbour and for other purposes.
Wolverhampton and Cannock Chase Railway Act 1901	1 Edw. 7. c. ccliv	17 August 1901
An Act for making a railway in the county of Stafford from Wolverhampton to Great Wyrley and for other purposes.
Leeds Corporation (General Powers) Act 1901 (repealed)	1 Edw. 7. c. cclv	17 August 1901
An Act to authorise the Corporation of Leeds to make street works and to lay down tramways and to make better provision in regard to the loans of the Corporation and the health local government and improvement of the city and for other purposes. (Repealed by West Yorkshire Act 1980 (c. xiv))
Leeds Corporation (Water) Act 1901	1 Edw. 7. c. cclvi	17 August 1901
An Act to empower the Corporation of Leeds to make additional waterworks and for other purposes.
South Lancashire Tramways Act 1901 (repealed)	1 Edw. 7. c. cclvii	17 August 1901
An Act to confer further powers upon the South Lancashire Tramways Company for the construction of tramways and street improvements and for other purposes. (Repealed by South Lancashire Transport Act 1958 (6 & 7 Eliz. 2. c. xxxiii))
Stratton and Bude Improvement Act 1901	1 Edw. 7. c. cclviii	17 August 1901
An Act to authorise the Urban District Council of Stratton and Bude to purchase the undertaking of the Bude Harbour and Canal Company and to construct waterworks and supply water within their district and adjoining parishes and to make further and better provision for the local government of the district and for other purposes.
Belfast and Northern Counties Railway Act 1901	1 Edw. 7. c. cclix	17 August 1901
An Act to provide for the purchase by the Belfast and Northern Counties Railway Company of the Derry Central Railway from the Commissioners of Public Works in Ireland.
London United Tramways Act 1901	1 Edw. 7. c. cclx	17 August 1901
An Act for conferring further powers on the London United Tramways Limited for constructing tramways and widening and altering roads in the counties of Middlesex and Surrey and for other purposes.
Wallasey Improvement Act 1901	1 Edw. 7. c. cclxi	17 August 1901
An Act to empower the Wallasey Urban District Council to construct a railway to their gasworks and to make further provision in regard to the health local government and improvement of the district and the borrowing of money and for other purposes.
Portmadoc, Beddgelert and South Snowdon Railway Act 1901	1 Edw. 7. c. cclxii	17 August 1901
An Act for the acquisition of the undertaking of the Portmadoc Croesor and Beddgelert Tram Railway Company to construct railways and works in the parishes of Treflys Ynyscynhaiarn and Beddgelert in the county of Carnarvon and the parish of Llanfrothen in the county of Merioneth to produce store and supply electricity for public and private purposes and for other purposes.
Weston-Super-Mare Gas Act 1901	1 Edw. 7. c. cclxiii	17 August 1901
An Act for conferring further powers on the Weston-super-Mare Gaslight Company and for other purposes.
Bristol Docks and Railways Act 1901	1 Edw. 7. c. cclxiv	17 August 1901
An Act to empower the Mayor Aldermen and Burgesses of the City of Bristol to construct an additional dock and railways and other works to extend the city and county of Bristol and for other purposes.
Manchester and Liverpool Electric Express Railway Act 1901	1 Edw. 7. c. cclxv	17 August 1901
An Act for incorporating and conferring powers upon the Manchester and Liverpool Electric Express Railway Company.
Llanelly Harbour Act 1901	1 Edw. 7. c. cclxvi	17 August 1901
An Act to revive and extend the powers for the compulsory purchase of lands by the Llanelly Harbour and Burry Navigation Commissioners for the execution of works authorised by the Llanelly Harbour Act 1896 (Note: Llanelly Harbour Act 1896 (59 & 60 Vict. c. clxxxvi)) for the improvement of the port and harbour of Llanelly and to empower the said Commissioners to borrow moneys with the consent of the Urban District Council of Llanelly and for other purposes.
Derby Corporation Act 1901	1 Edw. 7. c. cclxvii	17 August 1901
An Act to extend the boundaries of the Borough of Derby and to empower the Corporation to construct tramways additional waterworks sewerage and sewage disposal works street widenings and improvements to repeal sections 43 to 46 both inclusive of the Derby Corporation Act 1877 (Note: Derby Corporation Act 1877 (40 & 41 Vict. c. cxviii)) and to confer further powers in regard to the health local government and improvement of the borough and for other purposes.
Harrogate Corporation Act 1901 (repealed)	1 Edw. 7. c. cclxviii	17 August 1901
An Act to authorise the Corporation of Harrogate to construct certain street improvements and to make further provision in regard to the health and local government of the town. (Repealed by Harrogate Stray Act 1985 (c. xxii))
Rugby Water and Improvement Act 1901	1 Edw. 7. c. cclxix	17 August 1901
An Act to authorise the Urban District Council of Rugby in the County of Warwick to construct additional waterworks for the supply of their district and the parish of Bilton and to make further and better provision for the improvement health local government and finance of the district and for other purposes.
Loch Leven Water Act 1901	1 Edw. 7. c. cclxx	17 August 1901
An Act to incorporate and confer powers upon the Loch Leven Water and Electric Power Company to enable them to construct maintain and work waterworks and water power and electrical generating stations for the supply of electrical energy and to acquire lands and for other purposes.
London County Council (Tramways and Improvements) Act 1901	1 Edw. 7. c. cclxxi	17 August 1901
An Act to enable the London County Council to construct new tramways and to reconstruct and alter tramways in the County of London to work tramways by electric traction and to make street improvements and for other purposes.
London County Council (General Powers) Act 1901	1 Edw. 7. c. cclxxii	17 August 1901
An Act to empower the London County Council to make street improvements and works and to purchase lands in the Administrative County of London and for other purposes.
Devonport Corporation (Gas) Act 1901	1 Edw. 7. c. cclxxiii	17 August 1901
An Act to authorise the Mayor Aldermen and Burgesses of the Borough of Devonport to purchase the undertaking of the Devonport Gas and Coke Company and to supply gas within the Borough of Devonport and for other purposes.
Southampton and Winchester Great Western Junction Railway Act 1901 (repealed)	1 Edw. 7. c. cclxxiv	17 August 1901
An Act for making a railway between Winchester and Southampton to be called the Southampton and Winchester Great Western Junction Railway and for other purposes. (Repealed by Southampton and Winchester Great Western Junction Railway (Abandonment) Act 1905 (5 Edw. 7. c. iv))
City and Brixton Railway Act 1901	1 Edw. 7. c. cclxxv	17 August 1901
An Act for conferring further powers on the City and Brixton Railway Company.
Watford and District Tramways Act 1901	1 Edw. 7. c. cclxxvi	17 August 1901
An Act to incorporate the Watford and District Tramways Company and to empower that Company to make and maintain tramways and other works and for other purposes.
Tramways Orders Confirmation (No. 1) Act 1901	1 Edw. 7. c. cclxxvii	17 August 1901
An Act to confirm certain Provisional Orders made by the Board of Trade under the Tramways Act 1870 relating to Ashton-under-Lyne Corporation Tramways Denton Urban District Council Tramways Devonport Corporation Tramway Liverpool Corporation Tramways Extensions Northampton Corporation Tramways and Pontypridd Urban District Council Tramways.
	Ashton-under-Lyne Corporation Tramways Order 1901 Order authorising the Mayor Aldermen and Burgesses of the Borough of Ashton-under-Lyne to construct additional Tramways in their Borough and conferring further powers upon them with regard to the Tramways already constructed therein.	
	Denton Urban District Council Tramways Order 1901 Order authorising the Urban District Council of Denton to construct Tramways in their District.	
	Devonport Corporation Tramways Order 1901 Order amending the Devonport Corporation Tramway Order 1899 with respect to the commencement and opening for public traffic of the tramway thereby authorised.	
	Liverpool Corporation Tramways Extensions Order 1901 Order authorising the Mayor Aldermen and Citizens of the City of Liverpool to construct additional Tramways in the said City.	
	Northampton Corporation Tramways Order 1901 Order authorising the Mayor Aldermen and Burgesses of the Borough of Northampton to construct Tramways in their Borough and conferring further powers upon them with regard to the Tramways already constructed therein.	
	Pontypridd Urban District Council Tramways Order 1901 Order authorising the Urban District Council of Pontypridd to construct Tramways in their District.	
Education Board Provisional Order Confirmation (London) Act 1901	1 Edw. 7. c. cclxxviii	17 August 1901
An Act to confirm a Provisional Order made by the Board of Education under the Elementary Education Acts 1870 to 1900 to enable the School Board for London to put in force the Lands Clauses Acts.
	School Board for London Order 1901 Provisional Order for putting in force the Lands Clauses Acts.	
Greenock Corporation Order Confirmation Act 1901 (repealed)	1 Edw. 7. c. cclxxix	17 August 1901
An Act to confirm a Provisional Order under the Private Legislation Procedure (Scotland) Act 1899 relating to Greenock Corporation. (Repealed by South of Scotland Electricity Order Confirmation Act 1956 (4 & 5 Eliz. 2. c. xciv))
	Greenock Corporation Order 1901 Provisional Order for conferring further powers on the Town Council of the Burgh of Greenock and for other purposes.	
Pier and Harbour Order Confirmation (No. 4) Act 1901	1 Edw. 7. c. cclxxx	17 August 1901
An Act to confirm a Provisional Order made by the Board of Trade under the General Pier and Harbour Act 1861 relating to Berehaven.
	Berehaven Harbour Order 1901 Provisional Order for the construction of a Harbour and Works in connection therewith at Berehaven in the County of Cork.	
Paisley District Tramways Order Confirmation Act 1901 (repealed)	1 Edw. 7. c. cclxxxi	17 August 1901
An Act to confirm a Provisional Order under the Private Legislation Procedure (Scotland) Act 1899 relating to Paisley District Tramways. (Repealed by Glasgow Corporation Consolidation (Water, Transport and Markets) Order Confirmation Act 1964 (c. xliii))
	Paisley District Tramways Order 1901 Provisional Order incorporating the Paisley District Tramways Company and empowering that Company to make and maintain Tramways and for other purposes.	

=== Sources ===
- The Public General Statutes passed in the Sixty-Fourth Year of the reign of Her Majesty Queen Victoria and in the First Year of the reign of His Majesty King Edward the Seventh. 1901. Vol. 39. London: Eyre and Spottiswoode. 1901 – via Internet Archive.

== See also ==
- List of acts of the Parliament of the United Kingdom
