= RAF Riccall =

Royal Air Force base in Yorkshire, England

RAF Riccall
- Riccall, North Yorkshire in England

Site information
- Type: Royal Air Force satellite station
- Owner: Air Ministry
- Operator: Royal Air Force
- Controlled by: RAF Bomber Command

Location
- Shown within North Yorkshire RAF Riccall (the United Kingdom)
- Coordinates: 53°49′26″N 001°01′50″W

Site history
- Built: 1941
- In use: 1942 - 1958
- Battles/wars: European theatre of World War II

Airfield information
- Elevation: 10 metres (33 ft) AMSL
Runways
Direction	Length and surface
00/00	1,810 metres (5,938 ft) Asphalt
00/00	1,310 metres (4,298 ft) Asphalt
00/00	1,410 metres (4,626 ft) Asphalt

RAF Riccall is a former Royal Air Force satellite station located 3.1 miles (5 km) north east of Selby, North Yorkshire and 7.9 miles (12.7 km) south west of Elvington, North Yorkshire, England.

== History ==
The airfield was opened in September 1942 as a satellite to RAF Marston Moor. It had three runways of the A-style airfield; the longest was 5,940 feet (1,810 m) long, the second was 4,290 feet (1,310 m) long and the third was 4,620 feet (1,410 m) long. All were 50 yards (46 m) wide. The technical site consisted of six T2 hangars and one B1 hangar. The first runways built on the site sank into the soft earth of the low-lying ground, and had to be built back up again.

During October 1942, No. 76 and No. 80 Conversion Flights (along with No. 10 Conversion Flight from another airfield) joined together to make No. 1658 Heavy Conversion Unit RAF.

The following units were based at the airfield:

- No. 35 Maintenance Unit RAF.
- No. 91 Maintenance Unit RAF.
- No. 261 Maintenance Unit RAF.
- No. 268 Maintenance Unit RAF.
- No. 939 (West Riding) Balloon Squadron AAF.
- No. 1332 (Transport) Heavy Conversion Unit RAF.
- No. 1341 (Special Duties) Flight RAF.
- Airborne Forces Experimental Establishment.
- York & District Flying Group.

After 1945, flying ceased, although the site was used as storage until 1958. The south west side of the airfield and storage area is now part of Skipwith Common National Nature Reserve. Part of the site was also used for mining coal as part of the Selby Coalfield operation between the 1980s and 2004.

== Current use ==
The site is now used for farming.
