= Falkirk and District Tramways =

Early-20th-century Scottish light-rail service

Operation
- Locale: Falkirk
- Open: 21 October 1905
- Close: 21 July 1936
- Status: Closed

Infrastructure
- Track gauge: 4 ft (1,219 mm)
- Propulsion system: Electric

Statistics
- Route length: 7.8 miles (12.6 km)

The Falkirk and District Tramways operated a tramway service in Falkirk between 1905 and 1936.

== History ==
Falkirk and District Tramways Order Confirmation Act 1901
- Act of Parliament
- Parliament of the United Kingdom
- Long title: An Act to confirm a Provisional Order under the Private Legislation Procedure (Scotland) Act 1899 relating to the Falkirk and District Tramways.
- Citation: 1 Edw. 7. c. xxxi

Dates
- Royal assent: 2 July 1901

Other legislation
- Relates to: Private Legislation Procedure (Scotland) Act 1899

Text of statute as originally enacted

The company was incorporated by the Falkirk and District Tramways Order Confirmation Act 1901 (1 Edw. 7. c. xxxi), and started services on 21 October 1905. The company obtained most its initial tramcars from the Compagnie Générale de Construction of St Denis, France. Three others were obtained from Brush.

== Closure ==
The Scottish Motor Traction Company took over the company in 1935, and the tramway services were closed on 21 July 1936 in favour of its own bus services.

Tramcar 14 survived and is now restored and in the custody of Falkirk Museums.
