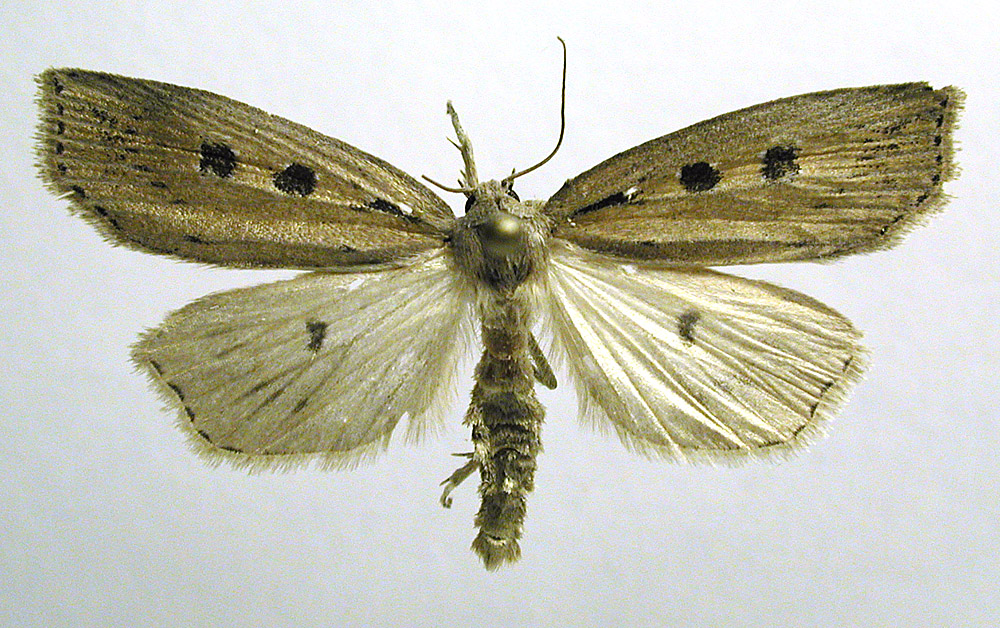

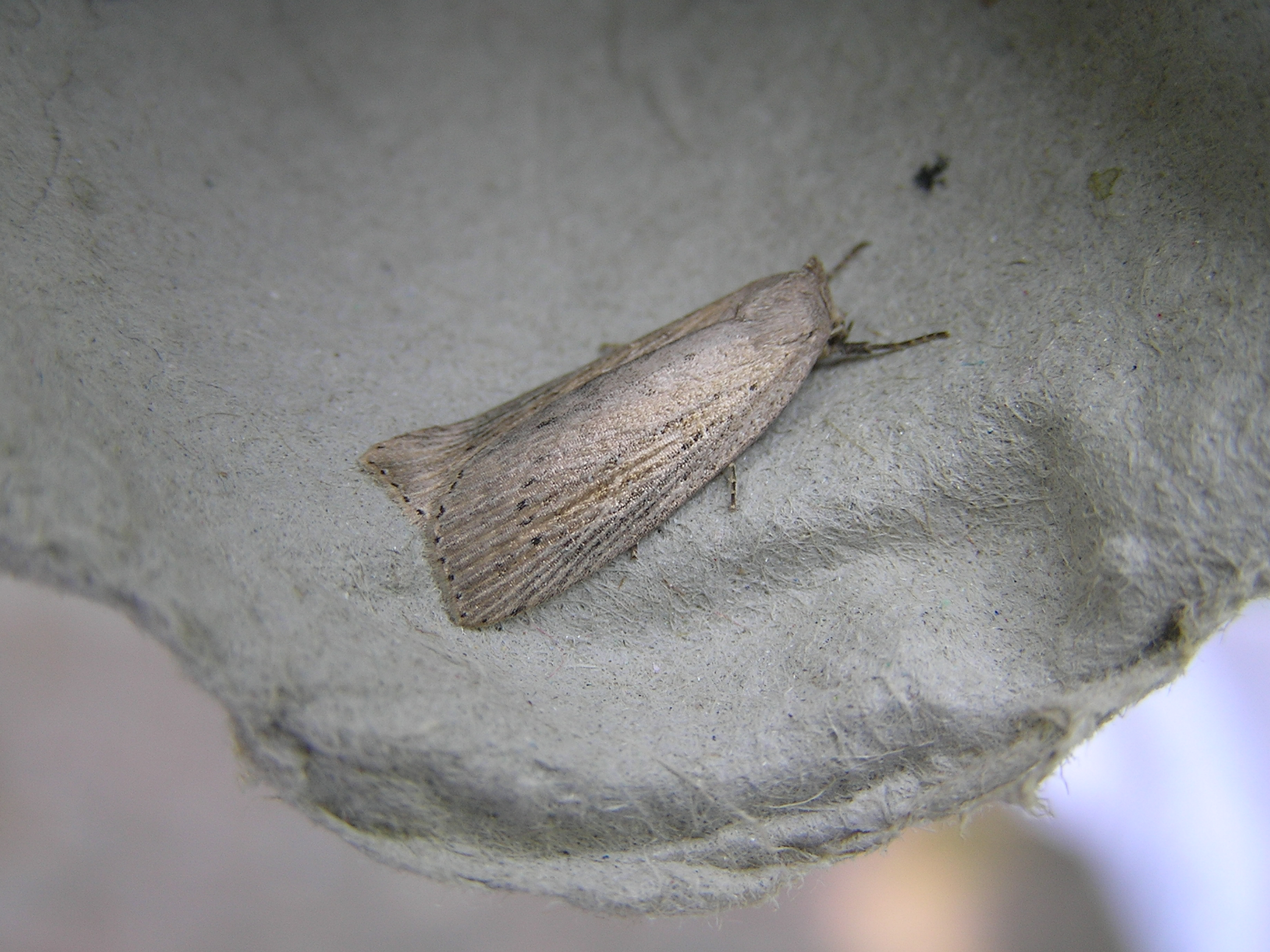

Scientific classification
- Kingdom: Animalia
- Phylum: Arthropoda
- Clade: Pancrustacea
- Class: Insecta
- Order: Lepidoptera
- Superfamily: Noctuoidea
- Family: Noctuidae
- Genus: Chilodes
- Species: C. maritimus

Binomial name
- Chilodes maritimus (Tauscher, 1806)

Synonyms
- Noctua maritima Tauscher, 1806; Tortrix bipunctana Haworth, 1812; Noctua ulvae Hübner, [1817]; Melia sericea Curtis, 1828; Nonagria ulvae var. nigromaculata Schmidt, 1858; Nonagria ulvae var. wismariensis Schmidt, 1858; Senta maritima grisea Wagner, 1929

= Chilodes maritimus =

Silky wainscot

Species of moth

Chilodes maritimus, the silky wainscot, is a moth of the family Noctuidae. It is found in most of Europe including Russia.

== Technical description and variation ==
N. maritima Tausch (= sericea Curt., anella Stph.). Forewing silky grey: the veins pale grey, the intervals darker, stigmata pale, hardly perceptible; outer line alone represented by a curved row of black vein-dots; hindwing pure white, with traces of an outer row of dark dots; — ab. ulvae Hbn. has the forewing along the centre rufous ochreous, the costa dark grey with the veins pale; the stigmata lined with white; outer line of dots followed by a dark shade and a row of minute dots before termen; hindwing ochreous white, with a grey cellspot and outer row of dots; — in ab. bipunctata Haw. (= nigromaculata Schmidt) (48 e) the two stigmata are deep black, with a small black spot at base of cell; in wismariensis Schmidt a broad black stripe runs longitudinally through the middle of wing from base to termen;— in nigrocostata Stgr. a broad black stripe runs along the costa; — nigristriata Stgr. is more like the typical grey form but with many black streaks running parallel to the veins. Larva ochreous with fine dark and light longitudinal lines; bead and thoracic plate brown. The wingspan is 29–36 mm.

== Biology ==
Adults are on wing from June to August.

The larvae are partially carnivorous, feeding on insects (including pupae of other wainscots) internally within the stems of Phragmites australis.
