= List of acts of the Parliament of the United Kingdom from 1904 =

This is a complete list of acts of the Parliament of the United Kingdom for the year 1904.

Note that the first parliament of the United Kingdom was held in 1801; parliaments between 1707 and 1800 were either parliaments of Great Britain or of Ireland). For acts passed up until 1707, see the list of acts of the Parliament of England and the list of acts of the Parliament of Scotland. For acts passed from 1707 to 1800, see the list of acts of the Parliament of Great Britain. See also the list of acts of the Parliament of Ireland.

For acts of the devolved parliaments and assemblies in the United Kingdom, see the list of acts of the Scottish Parliament, the list of acts of the Northern Ireland Assembly, and the list of acts and measures of Senedd Cymru; see also the list of acts of the Parliament of Northern Ireland.

The number shown after each act's title is its chapter number. Acts passed before 1963 are cited using this number, preceded by the year(s) of the reign during which the relevant parliamentary session was held; thus the Union with Ireland Act 1800 is cited as "39 & 40 Geo. 3 c. 67", meaning the 67th act passed during the session that started in the 39th year of the reign of George III and which finished in the 40th year of that reign. Note that the modern convention is to use Arabic numerals in citations (thus "41 Geo. 3" rather than "41 Geo. III"). Acts of the last session of the Parliament of Great Britain and the first session of the Parliament of the United Kingdom are both cited as "41 Geo. 3". Acts passed from 1963 onwards are simply cited by calendar year and chapter number.

== 4 Edw. 7 ==
The fifth session of the 27th Parliament of the United Kingdom, which met from 2 February 1904 until 15 August 1904.

This session was also traditionally cited as 4 Ed. 7 or 4 E. 7.

=== Public general acts ===
Short title	Citation	Royal assent
Long title
Consolidated Fund (No. 1) Act 1904 (repealed)	4 Edw. 7. c. 1	29 March 1904
An Act to apply certain sums out of the Consolidated Fund to the service of the years ending on the thirty-first day of March one thousand nine hundred and four and one thousand nine hundred and five. (Repealed by Statute Law Revision Act 1927 (17 & 18 Geo. 5. c. 42))
Metropolitan Improvements (Funds) Act 1904 (repealed)	4 Edw. 7. c. 2	29 March 1904
An Act to authorise the appropriation of the surplus funds derived from Battersea Park towards the opening of the Mall into Charing Cross and other Metropolitan Improvements. (Repealed by Statute Law Revision Act 1927 (17 & 18 Geo. 5. c. 42))
Telegraph (Money) Act 1904 (repealed)	4 Edw. 7. c. 3	29 March 1904
An Act to provide for raising further Money for the purpose of the Telegraph Acts, 1863 to 1899. (Repealed by Statute Law Revision Act 1927 (17 & 18 Geo. 5. c. 42))
Wild Birds Protection Act 1904 (repealed)	4 Edw. 7. c. 4	28 April 1904
An Act to amend the Wild Birds Protection Acts. (Repealed by Protection of Birds Act 1954 (2 & 3 Eliz. 2. c. 30))
Army (Annual) Act 1904 (repealed)	4 Edw. 7. c. 5	28 April 1904
An Act to provide, during Twelve Months, for the Discipline and Regulation of the Army. (Repealed by Statute Law Revision Act 1927 (17 & 18 Geo. 5. c. 42), Army and Air Force (Annual) Act 1932 (22 & 23 Geo. 5. c. 22), Statute Law Revision Act 1950 (14 Geo. 6. c. 6), Statute Law Revision Act 1953 (2 & 3 Eliz. 2. c. 5) and Revision of the Army and Air Force Acts (Transitional Provisions) Act 1955 (3 & 4 Eliz. 2. c. 20))
Hall-marking of Foreign Plate Act 1904 (repealed)	4 Edw. 7. c. 6	22 July 1904
An Act to amend the Law with respect to the Hall-marking of Foreign Plate. (Repealed by Hallmarking Act 1973 (c. 43))
Finance Act 1904 (repealed)	4 Edw. 7. c. 7	1 August 1904
An Act to grant certain duties of Customs and Inland Revenue, to alter other duties and to amend the Law relating to Customs and Inland Revenue and the National Debt, and to make other provisions for the financial arrangements of the year. (Repealed by Finance Act 1905 (5 Edw. 7. c. 4), Finance Act 1906 (6 Edw. 7. c. 8), Finance (1909-10) Act 1910 (10 Edw. 7 & 1 Geo. 5. c. 8), Income Tax Act 1918 (8 & 9 Geo. 5. c. 40), Statute Law Revision Act 1927 (17 & 18 Geo. 5. c. 42), Customs and Excise Act 1952 (15 & 16 Geo. 6 & 1 Eliz. 2. c. 44), Finance Act 1962 (10 & 11 Eliz. 2. c. 44) and Statute Law (Repeals) Act 1969 (c. 52))
Savings Banks Act 1904 (repealed)	4 Edw. 7. c. 8	1 August 1904
An Act to amend the Savings Banks Acts. (Repealed by Post Office Savings Bank Act 1908 (8 Edw. 7. c. 8), Statute Law Revision Act 1927 (17 & 18 Geo. 5. c. 42), Savings Banks Act 1929 (19 & 20 Geo. 5. c. 27), Post Office Savings Bank Act 1954 (2 & 3 Eliz. 2. c. 62) and Trustee Savings Banks Act 1954 (2 & 3 Eliz. 2. c. 63))
Registration of Clubs (Ireland) Act 1904 (repealed)	4 Edw. 7. c. 9	15 August 1904
An Act to provide for the Registration of Clubs in Ireland, and for other purposes connected therewith. (Repealed by Registration of Clubs Act (Northern Ireland) 1967 (c. 27 (N.I.)))
Wild Birds Protection (St. Kilda) Act 1904 (repealed)	4 Edw. 7. c. 10	15 August 1904
An Act to extend the provisions of the Wild Birds Protection Acts to the Island of St. Kilda, excepting as regards certain Birds required for the support of the Inhabitants of the Island. (Repealed by Protection of Birds Act 1954 (2 & 3 Eliz. 2. c. 30))
University of Liverpool Act 1904 (repealed)	4 Edw. 7. c. 11	15 August 1904
An Act to extend the privileges of the Graduates of the University of Liverpool. (Repealed by Statute Law (Repeals) Act 1998 (c. 43))
Leeds University Act 1904 (repealed)	4 Edw. 7. c. 12	15 August 1904
An Act to extend the privileges of the Graduates of the University of Leeds. (Repealed by Statute Law (Repeals) Act 1998 (c. 43))
London Electric Lighting Areas Act 1904 (repealed)	4 Edw. 7. c. 13	15 August 1904
An Act to provide for the Adjustment, in accordance with changes of boundary effected under the London Government Act, 1899, (Note: London Government Act 1899 (62 & 63 Vict. c. 14)) of the Areas within which Local Authorities and Companies are authorised to supply Electricity. (Repealed by Statute Law (Repeals) Act 1973 (c. 39))
Post Office Act 1904 (repealed)	4 Edw. 7. c. 14	15 August 1904
An Act to amend the Post Office Acts with respect to cumulative commissions on Money Orders and the use of embossed and impressed stamps. (Repealed by Post Office Act 1908 (8 Edw. 7. c. 48))
Prevention of Cruelty to Children Act 1904 (repealed)	4 Edw. 7. c. 15	15 August 1904
An Act to amend the Law relating to the Prevention of Cruelty to Children. (Repealed for England and Wales by Children Act 1908 (8 Edw. 7. c. 67), Criminal Justice Administration Act 1914 (4 & 5 Geo. 5. c. 58), Education Act 1921 (11 & 12 Geo. 5. c. 51) and Statute Law Revision Act 1927 (17 & 18 Geo. 5. c. 42), for Scotland by Children and Young Persons (Scotland) Act 1932 (22 & 23 Geo. 5. c. 47) and for Northern Ireland by Education (Amendment) Act (Northern Ireland) 1953 (c. 11 (N.I.)))
Public Health Act 1904 (repealed)	4 Edw. 7. c. 16	15 August 1904
An Act to enable Regulations to be made for carrying into effect conventions with respect to the prevention of danger arising to public health from vessels, and the prevention of the conveyance of infection by means of vessels. (Repealed for England and Wales by Public Health Act 1936 (26 Geo. 5 & 1 Edw. 8. c. 49), for Scotland by Public Health (Scotland) Act 1945 (9 & 10 Geo. 6. c. 15) and for Northern Ireland by Statute Law (Repeals) Act 1969 (c. 52))
Appropriation Act 1904 (repealed)	4 Edw. 7. c. 17	15 August 1904
An Act to apply a sum out of the Consolidated Fund to the service of the year ending on the thirty-first day of March one thousand nine hundred and five, and to appropriate the Supplies granted in this Session of Parliament. (Repealed by Statute Law Revision Act 1927 (17 & 18 Geo. 5. c. 42))
Education (Local Authority Default) Act 1904 (repealed)	4 Edw. 7. c. 18	15 August 1904
An Act to make provision for the case of default on the part of Local Authorities in the performance of their duties as respects elementary schools. (Repealed by Education Act 1921 (11 & 12 Geo. 5. c. 51))
Railways (Private Sidings) Act 1904 (repealed)	4 Edw. 7. c. 19	15 August 1904
An Act to amend the Law relating to Private Sidings on Railways. (Repealed for England and Wales and Scotland by Transport Act 1962 (10 & 11 Eliz. 2. c. 46) and for Northern Ireland by Statute Law Revision (Northern Ireland) Act 1973 (c. 55))
Poor Law Authorities (Transfer of Property) Act 1904 (repealed)	4 Edw. 7. c. 20	15 August 1904
An Act to make provision for the transfer of Property and other matters consequent upon the dissolution of Districts and Poor Law Unions or the addition of one Poor Law Union to another. (Repealed by Poor Law Act 1927 (17 & 18 Geo. 5. c. 14))
Capital Expenditure (Money) Act 1904 (repealed)	4 Edw. 7. c. 21	15 August 1904
An Act to enable the Treasury to borrow by means of Exchequer Bonds for purposes for which they are authorised to borrow by means of Terminable Annuities. (Repealed by Statute Law Revision Act 1966 (c. 5))
Cunard Agreement (Money) Act 1904 (repealed)	4 Edw. 7. c. 22	15 August 1904
An Act to make provision with respect to an advance to be made to the Canard Steamship Company (Limited), under an Agreement with that Company dated the thirtieth day of July nineteen hundred and three. (Repealed by Statute Law Revision Act 1927 (17 & 18 Geo. 5. c. 42))
Licensing Act 1904 (repealed)	4 Edw. 7. c. 23	15 August 1904
An Act to amend the Licensing Acts, 1828 to 1902, in respect to the extinction of Licences and the grant of new Licences. (Repealed by Licensing (Consolidation) Act 1910 (10 Edw. 7 & 1 Geo. 5. c. 24))
Wireless Telegraphy Act 1904 (repealed)	4 Edw. 7. c. 24	15 August 1904
An Act to provide for the regulation of Wireless Telegraphy. (Repealed by Statute Law (Repeals) Act 1973 (c. 39))
Isle of Man (Customs) Act 1904 (repealed)	4 Edw. 7. c. 25	15 August 1904
An Act to amend the Law with respect to Customs Duties in the Isle of Man. (Repealed by Isle of Man (Customs) Act 1927 (17 & 18 Geo. 5. c. 20))
Indian Councils Act 1904 (repealed)	4 Edw. 7. c. 26	15 August 1904
An Act to amend the Indian Councils Act, 1874. (Note: Indian Councils Act 1874 (37 & 38 Vict. c. 91)) (Repealed by Government of India Act 1915 (5 & 6 Geo. 5. c. 61))
Secretary for Scotland Act 1904 (repealed)	4 Edw. 7. c. 27	15 August 1904
An Act to authorise the transfer to the Secretary for Scotland of certain powers and duties under the Acts relating to Reformatory and Industrial Schools. (Repealed by Children Act 1908 (8 Edw. 7. c. 67))
Weights and Measures Act 1904 (repealed)	4 Edw. 7. c. 28	15 August 1904
An Act to amend the Law relating to Weights and Measures. (Repealed for England and Wales and Scotland by Weights and Measures Act 1963 (c. 31) and for Northern Ireland by Weights and Measures Act (Northern Ireland) 1967 (c. 6 (N.I.)))
Expiring Laws Continuance Act 1904 (repealed)	4 Edw. 7. c. 29	15 August 1904
An Act to continue Various Expiring Laws. (Repealed by Statute Law Revision Act 1927 (17 & 18 Geo. 5. c. 42))
Bishoprics of Southwark and Birmingham Act 1904 (repealed)	4 Edw. 7. c. 30	15 August 1904
An Act to provide for the foundation of Bishoprics of Southwark and Birmingham and for matters incidental thereto. (Repealed by Statute Law (Repeals) Act 1973 (c. 39))
Shop Hours Act 1904 (repealed)	4 Edw. 7. c. 31	15 August 1904
An Act to provide for the Early Closing of Shops. (Repealed by Shops Act 1912 (2 & 3 Geo. 5. c. 3))
Outdoor Relief (Friendly Societies) Act 1904 (repealed)	4 Edw. 7. c. 32	15 August 1904
An Act to amend the Outdoor Relief Friendly Societies Act, 1894. (Note: Outdoor Relief Friendly Societies Act 1894 (57 & 58 Vict. c. 25)) (Repealed by Poor Law Act 1927 (17 & 18 Geo. 5. c. 14))
Anglo-French Convention Act 1904 (repealed)	4 Edw. 7. c. 33	15 August 1904
An Act for approving and carrying into Effect a Convention between His Majesty and the President of the French Republic. (Repealed by Statute Law Revision Act 1953 (2 & 3 Eliz. 2. c. 5) and Statute Law (Repeals) Act 1976 (c. 16))
Irish Land Act 1904 (repealed)	4 Edw. 7. c. 34	15 August 1904
An Act to explain and amend Section forty-eight of the Irish Land Act, 1903, (Note: Irish Land Act 1903 (3 Edw. 7. c. 37)) with respect to the payment and application of the percentage provided by the said section. (Repealed by Statute Law Revision Act 1950 (14 Geo. 6. c. 6) and Statute Law Revision Act 1953 (2 & 3 Eliz. 2. c. 5))
Prisons (Scotland) Act 1904 (repealed)	4 Edw. 7. c. 35	15 August 1904
An Act to amend the Law relating to prisons in Scotland by abolishing the distinction between general prisons and ordinary prisons. (Repealed by Prisons (Scotland) Act 1952 (15 & 16 Geo. 6 & 1 Eliz. 2. c. 61))
Public Works Loans Act 1904 (repealed)	4 Edw. 7. c. 36	15 August 1904
An Act to grant Money for the purpose of certain Local Loans out of the Local Loans Fund and for other purposes relating to Local Loans. (Repealed by Statute Law Revision Act 1927 (17 & 18 Geo. 5. c. 42) and Statute Law Revision Act 1950 (14 Geo. 6. c. 6))

=== Local acts ===
Short title	Citation	Royal assent
Long title
Dumbarton Tramways Order Confirmation Act 1904	4 Edw. 7. c. i	29 March 1904
An Act to confirm a Provisional Order under the Private Legislation Procedure (Scotland) Act 1899 (Note: Private Legislation Procedure (Scotland) Act 1899 (62 & 63 Vict. c. 47)) relating to Dumbarton Tramways.
	Dumbarton Tramways Order 1904 Provisional Order for conferring powers upon the Electric Supply Corporation Limited with respect to the construction and maintenance of tramways in the Royal Burgh of Dumbarton and for other purposes.	
Kilmarnock Corporation Order Confirmation Act 1904	4 Edw. 7. c. ii	29 March 1904
An Act to confirm a Provisional Order under the Private Legislation Procedure (Scotland) Act 1899 relating to Kilmarnock Corporation.
	Kilmarnock Corporation Order 1904 Provisional Order to authorise the Provost Magistrates and Councillors of the Burgh of Kilmarnock to construct and work Tramways in and adjacent to the Burgh and for other purposes.	
London, Chatham and Dover Railway Act 1904	4 Edw. 7. c. iii	28 April 1904
An Act to enable the London Chatham and Dover Railway Company to raise further capital.
Young and Bell's Patents Act 1904	4 Edw. 7. c. iv	28 April 1904
An Act for rendering valid certain Letters Patent granted to William Young and Alexander Bell in respect of an invention for improvements in the decomposition of mineral oils for the production of illuminating gas and to William Young in respect of inventions (1) for improvements in the production of illuminating gas from mineral oils and in apparatus therefor and for producing water gas and (2) for improvements in the production of illuminating gas and bye-products from liquid hydrocarbons and in apparatus therefor.
Appleby Corporation Gas Act 1904	4 Edw. 7. c. v	28 April 1904
An Act to empower the Corporation of Appleby to purchase the undertaking of the Appleby Gas Light and Goal Company and to supply gas within the borough and for other purposes.
Southend Waterworks Act 1904 (repealed)	4 Edw. 7. c. vi	28 April 1904
An Act to empower the Southend Waterworks Company to raise further Capital and for other purposes. (Repealed by Southend Water Order 1958 (SI 1958/1390))
New Zealand Loan and Mercantile Agency Company Act 1904	4 Edw. 7. c. vii	24 June 1904
An Act to make provision for dealing with the trustees' preference shares of the New Zealand Loan and Mercantile Agency Company Limited and the trustees' certificates issued in respect thereof and for other purposes.
Great Northern and City Railway Act 1904	4 Edw. 7. c. viii	24 June 1904
An Act to extend the time for the completion of railways and for other purposes.
Corbridge Gas Act 1904	4 Edw. 7. c. ix	24 June 1904
An Act for incorporating and conferring powers on the Corbridge Gas Company.
City of Norwich Waterworks Act 1904 (repealed)	4 Edw. 7. c. x	24 June 1904
An Act to empower the City of Norwich Waterworks Company to raise additional capital and for other purposes. (Repealed by Norwich City Council Act 1984 (c. xxiii))
Weston-Super-Mare Grand Pier Act 1904	4 Edw. 7. c. xi	24 June 1904
An Act to extend the time for the completion of the authorised Pier and Works of the Weston-super-Mare Grand Pier Company and for other purposes.
Barry Railway Act 1904	4 Edw. 7. c. xii	24 June 1904
An Act to extend the time for the completion of certain railways by the Barry Railway Company and for other purposes.
Victoria University of Manchester Act 1904 (repealed)	4 Edw. 7. c. xiii	24 June 1904
An Act to incorporate the Owens College Manchester with the Victoria University of Manchester and to transfer all the property and liabilities of the College to the Victoria University of Manchester and for other purposes. (Repealed by University of Manchester Act 2004 (c. iv))
Sutton Gas Act 1904	4 Edw. 7. c. xiv	24 June 1904
An Act for conferring further powers upon the Sutton Gas Company.
Bishop's Stortford and District Gas Act 1904 (repealed)	4 Edw. 7. c. xv	24 June 1904
An Act for incorporating and conferring powers on the Bishop's Stortford and District Gas Company. (Repealed by Bishop's Stortford, Harlow and Epping Gas and Electricity Act 1910 (10 Edw. 7 & 1 Geo. 5. c. xvii))
Hampton-in-Arden Gas Act 1904	4 Edw. 7. c. xvi	24 June 1904
An Act to incorporate the Hampton-in-Arden and Meriden Gas Company and to enable that Company to supply with gas certain parishes in the county of Warwick.
Ipswich Dock Act 1904	4 Edw. 7. c. xvii	24 June 1904
An Act to enable the Ipswich Dock Commissioners to construct certain works in connection with their docks to make a tramway and tramroad to raise additional money and for other purposes.
Great Eastern Railway (Steamboats) Act 1904	4 Edw. 7. c. xviii	24 June 1904
An Act to amend the powers of the Great Eastern Railway Company with respect to the use of steam vessels.
Huddersfield Corporation Act 1902 Amendment Act 1904 (repealed)	4 Edw. 7. c. xix	24 June 1904
An Act to amend the Huddersfield Corporation Act 1902 (Note: Huddersfield Corporation Act 1902 (2 Edw. 7. c. cxxxvii)) and for other purposes. (Repealed by West Yorkshire Act 1980 (c. xiv))
Metropolitan Railway Act 1904	4 Edw. 7. c. xx	24 June 1904
An Act to authorise the Metropolitan Railway Company to convert and consolidate their existing capital to raise additional capital and for other purposes.
West Metropolitan Railway (Abandonment) Act 1904 (repealed)	4 Edw. 7. c. xxi	24 June 1904
An Act for the abandonment of the West Metropolitan Railway and for other purposes. (Repealed by Statute Law (Repeals) Act 2013 (c. 2))
Wellington (Somerset) Gas Act 1904	4 Edw. 7. c. xxii	24 June 1904
An Act for incorporating and conferring powers on the Wellington (Somerset) Gas Company and other purposes.
Kettering Improvement Act 1904	4 Edw. 7. c. xxiii	24 June 1904
An Act to make further and better provision with regard to the electric light undertaking of the Council and for the improvement health local government and finance of the district and for other purposes.
Gosport Water Act 1904	4 Edw. 7. c. xxiv	24 June 1904
An Act to authorise the Gosport Waterworks Company to make additional Waterworks to acquire the Undertaking of the Lee-on-the-Solent Waterworks Company Limited and to raise additional capital to extend the limits of supply of the Company to confer further powers upon the Company and for other purposes.
Amersham, Beaconsfield and District Water Act 1904	4 Edw. 7. c. xxv	24 June 1904
An Act to extend the limits of supply of the Amersham Beaconsfield and District Waterworks Company Limited and to confer further powers upon that Company.
Cambrian Railways (Mid Wales Railway Amalgamation, &c.) Act 1904	4 Edw. 7. c. xxvi	24 June 1904
An Act for amalgamating the Mid Wales Railway Company with the Cambrian Railways Company for conferring further powers upon the last-named Company and for other purposes.
Nuneaton and Chilvers Coton Urban District Council (Prevention of Floods) Act 1904	4 Edw. 7. c. xxvii	24 June 1904
An Act to authorise the Urban District Council of Nuneaton and Chilvers Coton to construct works for prevention of floods on the River Anker within the urban district of Nuneaton and Chilvers Coton and the rural district of Nuneaton in the county of Warwick and for other purposes.
Ryde Gas Act 1904	4 Edw. 7. c. xxviii	24 June 1904
An Act for conferring further powers upon the Ryde Gaslight Company.
Blyth and Cowpen Gas Act 1904	4 Edw. 7. c. xxix	24 June 1904
An Act to confer further powers upon the Blyth and Cowpen Gas Company.
Whitby Gas Act 1904	4 Edw. 7. c. xxx	24 June 1904
An Act to confer further powers upon the Whitby Gas Company.
Harlow and Sawbridgeworth Gas Act 1904 (repealed)	4 Edw. 7. c. xxxi	24 June 1904
An Act for incorporating and conferring powers on the Harlow and Sawbridgeworth Gas Company and for other purposes. (Repealed by Bishop's Stortford, Harlow and Epping Gas and Electricity Act 1910 (10 Edw. 7 & 1 Geo. 5. c. xvii))
Sheppy Gas Act 1904	4 Edw. 7. c. xxxii	24 June 1904
An Act for consolidating the capital of and for conferring further powers on the Sheppy Gas Company.
Govan Electric Lighting (Further Powers) Act 1904 (repealed)	4 Edw. 7. c. xxxiii	24 June 1904
An Act to confer further powers on the provost magistrates and councillors of the burgh of Govan in connection with their electricity undertaking and for other purposes. (Repealed by Glasgow Boundaries Act 1912 (2 & 3 Geo. 5. c. xcv))
Liverpool and London and Globe Insurance Company's Act 1904	4 Edw. 7. c. xxxiv	24 June 1904
An Act to make provision with reference to the registration under the Companies Acts 1862 to 1900 of the Liverpool and London and Globe Insurance Company and the substitution of a memorandum and articles of association for their existing constitution and regulations and for the repeal of certain Acts relating to such Company and for other purposes.
University of Leeds Act 1904	4 Edw. 7. c. xxxv	24 June 1904
An Act to merge the Yorkshire College in the University of Leeds and to transfer all the property and liabilities of the Yorkshire College to the University of Leeds and for other purposes.
York Town and Blackwater Gas Act 1904	4 Edw. 7. c. xxxvi	24 June 1904
An Act for incorporating and conferring powers on the York Town and Blackwater Gas Company and for other purposes.
Chesterfield Corporation Tramways and Improvements Act 1904 (repealed)	4 Edw. 7. c. xxxvii	24 June 1904
An Act to authorise the Corporation of Chesterfield to construct and work tramways to execute further street works and improvements to extend their area for the supply of electricity to make further provision for the improvement local government and health of the Borough of Chesterfield and for other purposes. (Repealed by Chesterfield Corporation Act 1923 (13 & 14 Geo. 5. c. xcix))
Croydon Gas Act 1904	4 Edw. 7. c. xxxviii	24 June 1904
An Act to change the name of the Croydon Commercial Gas and Coke Company to the Croydon Gas Company and to confer further powers on the Company with respect to the raising of additional capital the construction and maintenance of additional gasworks and for other purposes.
Chippenham Gas Act 1904 (repealed)	4 Edw. 7. c. xxxix	24 June 1904
An Act for incorporating and conferring powers on the Chippenham Gas Company and for other purposes. (Repealed by Bath Gas Order 1932 (SR&O 1932/953))
Elysée Palace Hotel Company Limited Act 1904	4 Edw. 7. c. xl	24 June 1904
An Act to enable the Elysée Palace Hotel Company Limited to issue paid-up ordinary shares in satisfaction of the deferred shares to provide for the extinction of such deferred shares and for other purposes.
Saint Marylebone Electric Lighting Act 1904	4 Edw. 7. c. xli	24 June 1904
An Act for conferring further powers upon the mayor aldermen and councillors of the metropolitan borough of Saint Marylebone with regard to the supply of electricity and for other purposes.
Colney Hatch Gas Act 1904	4 Edw. 7. c. xlii	24 June 1904
An Act to authorise the Colney Hatch Gas Company to raise additional Capital to acquire Lands to enlarge their Works to alter name of Company to amend their existing Acts and for other purposes.
Gomersal Gas Act 1904 (repealed)	4 Edw. 7. c. xliii	24 June 1904
An Act for consolidating the Capital of the Gomersal Gas Company for enabling that Company to raise additional Capital and for other purposes. (Repealed by Spenborough Urban District Council Gas Order 1921 (SR&O 1921/1373))
North Staffordshire Railway Act 1904	4 Edw. 7. c. xliv	24 June 1904
An Act to confer further powers on the North Staffordshire Railway Company.
Chesterfield Gas and Water Board Act 1904 (repealed)	4 Edw. 7. c. xlv	24 June 1904
An Act to authorise the Chesterfield Gas and Water Board to make new waterworks and extend their gasworks and for other purposes. (Repealed by Chesterfield Corporation Act 1923 (13 & 14 Geo. 5. c. xcix))
Marylebone Chapels (Saint James Westmoreland Street) Act 1904	4 Edw. 7. c. xlvi	24 June 1904
An Act to provide for the sale of the Chapel of Saint James Westmoreland Street and for other purposes connected therewith.
South Staffordshire Mines Drainage Act 1904	4 Edw. 7. c. xlvii	24 June 1904
An Act to vary and amend the provisions of the South Staffordshire Mines Drainage Acts 1891 (Note: South Staffordshire Mines Drainage Act 1891 (54 & 55 Vict. c. clxxxv)) and 1894 (Note: South Staffordshire Mines Drainage Act 1894 (57 & 58 Vict. c. clxxi)) and for other purposes.
New River Company Act 1904	4 Edw. 7. c. xlviii	24 June 1904
An Act to make provision for the application and distribution of the water stock issued to the New River Company in discharge of the sum payable as compensation for the transfer of their water undertaking to the Metropolitan Water Board for the reconstruction of the Company and its registration as a limited company and for other purposes.
Kirkby-in-Ashfield Urban District Council (Gas) Act 1904	4 Edw. 7. c. xlix	24 June 1904
An Act to empower the urban district council of Kirkby-in-Ashfield to supply gas and to provide for the transfer to the Council of so much of the gas undertaking of the Sutton-in-Ashfield Urban District Council as is situate within the urban district of Kirkby-in-Ashfield and for other purposes.
Brixham Gas Act 1904	4 Edw. 7. c. l	24 June 1904
An Act for incorporating and conferring powers on the Brixham Gas Company.
Littlestone-on-Sea and District Water Act 1904	4 Edw. 7. c. li	24 June 1904
An Act for incorporating the Littlestone-on-Sea and District Water Company and empowering them to construct Works and supply Water and for other purposes.
Acton Improvement Act 1904	4 Edw. 7. c. lii	24 June 1904
An Act to confer upon the Urban District Council of Acton further powers with regard to the supply of electricity and the improvement health local government and finance of the district and for other purposes.
Midland Railway Act 1904	4 Edw. 7. c. liii	24 June 1904
An Act to confer additional powers upon the Midland Railway Company and upon that Company and the Great Eastern Railway Company and upon the Midland and Great Northern Railways Joint Committee and the Norfolk and Suffolk Joint Railways Committee for the construction of works and the acquisition of lands and for other purposes.
Lancashire Electric Power Act 1904	4 Edw. 7. c. liv	24 June 1904
An Act to confer further powers upon the Lancashire Electric Power Company and for other purposes.
Tynemouth Gas Act 1904	4 Edw. 7. c. lv	24 June 1904
An Act to confer further powers on the Tynemouth Gas Company.
Preston, Chorley and Horwich Tramways Act 1904	4 Edw. 7. c. lvi	24 June 1904
An Act to authorise the Preston Chorley and Horwich Tramways Company to acquire lands and for other purposes.
Barnard Castle Gas Act 1904	4 Edw. 7. c. lvii	24 June 1904
An Act for incorporating and conferring powers on the Barnard Castle Gas Company.
Saint Bartholemew's Hospital Act 1904	4 Edw. 7. c. lviii	24 June 1904
An Act to empower the Governors of Saint Bartholomew's Hospital in the city of London to demolish the church of Saint Bartholomew the Less and to use the site thereof and the burial ground adjoining thereto for the purposes of the said hospital and for uniting for ecclesiastical purposes the parish of Saint Bartholomew the Less with the parish of Saint Bartholomew the Great and for other purposes.
Metropolitan Commons (Hillingdon East) Supplemental Act 1904	4 Edw. 7. c. lix	24 June 1904
An Act to confirm a Scheme with respect to Norman's or No Man's Land Hillingdon East.
	Norman's or No Man's Land East Hillingdon Scheme.	
Metropolitan Commons (Farnborough) Supplemental Act 1904	4 Edw. 7. c. lx	24 June 1904
An Act to confirm an Amended Scheme with respect to Farnborough Common Broad Street Green Leach's Green and Green Street Green.
	Farnborough Common Broad Street Green, &c., Scheme.	
Metropolitan Police Provisional Order Confirmation Act 1904 (repealed)	4 Edw. 7. c. lxi	24 June 1904
An Act to confirm a Provisional Order made by one of His Majesty's Principal Secretaries of State under the Metropolitan Police Act 1886 (Note: Metropolitan Police Act 1886 (49 & 50 Vict. c. 22)) and the Metropolitan Police Courts Act 1897 (Note: Metropolitan Police Courts Act 1897 (60 & 61 Vict. c. 26)) relating to lands in the parishes of Islington Tottenham Putney and Woolwich. (Repealed by Statute Law (Repeals) Act 2008 (c. 12))
	Order made by the Secretary of State under the Metropolitan Police Act 1886 and the Metropolitan Police Courts Act 1897.	
Local Government Board's Provisional Orders Confirmation (No. 1) Act 1904	4 Edw. 7. c. lxii	24 June 1904
An Act to confirm certain Provisional Orders of the Local Government Board relating to Ashton-in-Makerfield Brighton Manchester Nelson Scarborough and Sunderland.
	Ashton-in-Makerfield Order 1904 Provisional Order for altering a Confirming Act. (Note: Local Government Board's Provisional Orders Confirmation (No. 9) Act 1893 (56 & 57 Vict. c. cxvii))	
	Brighton Pavilion Order 1904 Provisional Order for altering a Confirming Act. (Note: Local Government Board's Provisional Orders Confirmation (No. 11) Act 1894 (57 & 58 Vict. c. cxxiii))	
	Manchester Order 1904 Provisional Order for altering certain Confirming Acts.	
	Nelson Order 1904 Provisional Order for partially altering a Local Act (Note: Nelson Local Board Act 1879 (42 & 43 Vict. c. lxxxix)) and a Confirming Act. (Note: Local Government Board's Provisional Orders Confirmation (No. 15) Act 1897 (60 & 61 Vict. c. cxlii))	
	Scarborough Order 1904 Provisional Order for altering the Scarborough Corporation Act 1900. (Note: Scarborough Corporation Act 1900 (63 & 64 Vict. c. cclxxix))	
	Sunderland Order 1904 Provisional Order for altering a Confirming Act. (Note: Local Government Board's Provisional Orders Confirmation (No. 9) Act 1902 (2 Edw. 7. c. lxxxiii))	
Local Government Board's Provisional Orders Confirmation (No. 2) Act 1904	4 Edw. 7. c. lxiii	24 June 1904
An Act to confirm certain Provisional Orders of the Local Government Board relating to Brixham Coventry Liverpool Ripon and Southwark and the Bromley and Beckenham Joint Hospital District.
	Brixham Order 1904 Provisional Order to enable the Urban District Council of Brixham to put in force the Compulsory Clauses of the Lands Clauses Acts.	
	Bromley and Beckenham Joint Hospital Order 1904 Provisional Order to enable the Bromley and Beckenham Joint Hospital Hospital Board to put in force the Compulsory Clauses of the Lands Clauses Acts.	
	Coventry Order 1904 Provisional Order to enable the Urban Sanitary Authority for the City of Coventry to put in force the Compulsory Clauses of the Lands Clauses Acts.	
	Liverpool Order 1904 Provisional Order to enable the Urban Sanitary Authority for the City of Liverpool to put in force the Compulsory Clauses of the Lands Clauses Acts.	
	Ripon Order 1904 Provisional Order to enable the Urban District Council for the City of Ripon to put in force the Compulsory Clauses of the Lands Clauses Acts.	
	Southwark Order 1904 Provisional Order to enable the Council of the Metropolitan Borough of Southwark to put in force the Compulsory Clauses of the Lands Clauses Acts.	
Local Government Board's Provisional Orders Confirmation (No. 3) Act 1904	4 Edw. 7. c. lxiv	24 June 1904
An Act to confirm certain Provisional Orders of the Local Government Board relating to the Earsdon the Hanley Stoke Fenton and Longton the Henley and Wallingford the Wallingford and Crowmarsh and the Whitchurch and District Joint Hospital Districts.
	Earsdon Joint Hospital Order 1904 Provisional Order for forming a United District under Section 279 of the Public Health Act 1875. (Note: Public Health Act 1875 (38 & 39 Vict. c. 55))	
	Hanley, Stoke-on-Trent, Fenton and Longton Joint Hospital Order 1904 Provisional Order for altering Confirming Acts.	
	Henley-on-Thames and Wallingford Joint Smallpox Hospital Order 1904 Provisional Order for forming a United District under Section 279 of the Public Health Act 1875.	
	Wallingford and Crowmarsh Joint Hospital Order 1904 Provisional Order for altering a Confirming Act. (Note: Local Government Board's Provisional Orders Confirmation (No. 8) Act 1899 (62 & 63 Vict. c. cxii))	
	Whitchurch and District Joint Hospital Order 1904 Provisional Order for forming a United District under Section 279 of the Public Health Act 1875.	
Local Government Board's Provisional Order Confirmation (Poor Law) Act 1904 (repealed)	4 Edw. 7. c. lxv	24 June 1904
An Act to confirm a Provisional Order of the Local Government Board relating to the Stourbridge Union. (Repealed by Statute Law (Repeals) Act 1998 (c. 43))
	Stourbridge Union Order 1904 Provisional Order made in pursuance of sub-section (3) of Section 2 of the Poor Law Act 1889. (Note: Poor Law Act 1889 (52 & 53 Vict. c. 56))	
Electric Lighting Orders Confirmation (No. 1) Act 1904	4 Edw. 7. c. lxvi	24 June 1904
An Act to confirm certain Provisional Orders made by the Board of Trade under the Electric Lighting Acts 1882 (Note: Electric Lighting Act 1882 (45 & 46 Vict. c. 56)) and 1888 (Note: Electric Lighting Act 1888 (51 & 52 Vict. c. 12)) relating to Barry Clitheroe Gainsborough Glastonbury Heysham Kirkby-in-Ashfield Saffron Walden Walmer Whickham and Yardley.
	Barry Electric Lighting Order 1904 Provisional Order granted by the Board of Trade under the Electric Lighting Acts 1882 and 1888 amending the Barry Electric Lighting Order 1901.	
	Clitheroe Electric Lighting Order 1904 Provisional Order granted by the Board of Trade under the Electric Lighting Acts 1882 and 1888 to the Mayor Aldermen and Burgesses of the Borough of Clitheroe in respect of the Borough of Clitheroe in the County of Lancaster.	
	Gainsborough Electric Lighting Order 1904 Provisional Order granted by the Board of Trade under the Electric Lighting Acts 1882 and 1888 to the Urban District Council of Gainsborough in respect of the Urban District of Gainsborough in the County of Lincoln.	
	Glastonbury Corporation Electric Lighting Order 1904 Provisional Order granted by the Board of Trade under the Electric Lighting Acts 1882 and 1888 to the Mayor Aldermen and Burgesses of the Borough of Glastonbury in respect of the Borough of Glastonbury in the County of Somerset.	
	Heysham Electric Lighting Order 1904 Provisional Order granted by the Board of Trade under the Electric Lighting Acts 1882 and 1888 to the Urban District Council of Heysham in respect of the Urban District of Heysham in the County of Lancaster.	
	Kirkby-in-Ashfield Electric Lighting Order 1904 Provisional Order granted by the Board of Trade under the Electric Lighting Acts 1882 and 1888 to the Kirkby-in-Ashfield Urban District Council in respect of the Urban District of Kirkby-in-Ashfield in the County of Nottingham.	
	Saffron Walden Electric Lighting Order 1904 Provisional Order granted by the Board of Trade under the Electric Lighting Acts 1882 and 1888 to the Mayor Aldermen and Burgesses of the Borough of Saffron Walden in respect of the Borough of Saffron Walden in the County of Essex.	
	Walmer Electric Lighting Order 1904 Provisional Order granted by the Board of Trade under the Electric Lighting Acts 1882 and 1888 to the Urban District Council of Walmer in the County of Kent in respect of the Urban District of Walmer.	
	Whickham Electric Lighting Order 1904 Provisional Order granted by the Board of Trade under the Electric Lighting Acts 1882 and 1888 to the Urban District Council of Whickham to authorise the Council to transfer the Undertaking authorised by the Whickham Electric Lighting Order 1903 to the County of Durham Electrical Power Distribution Company Limited.	
	Yardley Urban District Electric Lighting Order 1904 Provisional Order granted by the Board of Trade under the Electric Lighting Acts 1882 and 1888 to the Rural District Council of Yardley in respect of the Rural District of Yardley in the County of Worcester.	
Donegal Railway Act 1904	4 Edw. 7. c. lxvii	22 July 1904
An Act to authorize the Donegal Railway Company to raise further Moneys by the creation and issue of Guaranteed Preference Stock for the purpose amongst others of completing the Ballyshannon Extension and to empower the Company to own and work Motor Cars and other Vehicles and for other purposes.
Mullingar, Kells and Drogheda Railway Act 1904	4 Edw. 7. c. lxviii	22 July 1904
An Act to empower the Mullingar Kells and Drogheda Railway Company to make a Deviation Railway in the County of Westmeath and an Extension Railway in the County of Louth and to enable that Company and the Lancashire and Yorkshire Railway Company to enter into working and other agreements and for other purposes.
South Western and Isle of Wight Junction Railway (Extension of Time) Act 1904	4 Edw. 7. c. lxix	22 July 1904
An Act to extend the time limited for the compulsory purchase of lands for and completion of the railways and works authorised by the South Western and Isle of Wight Junction Railway Act 1901 (Note: South Western and Isle of Wight Junction Railway Act 1901 (1 Edw. 7. c. xcix)) and for other purposes.
Bexhill Water and Gas Act 1904	4 Edw. 7. c. lxx	22 July 1904
An Act to extend the limits of supply of the Bexhill Water and Gas Company to authorise the Company to raise additional Capital and to construct additional Waterworks and for other purposes.
Harrow Road and Paddington Tramways Act 1904	4 Edw. 7. c. lxxi	22 July 1904
An Act to confer powers on the Harrow Road and Paddington Tramways Company for widening and altering roads and acquiring lands in the Counties of Middlesex and London to authorise the sale of the undertaking of the Company to the Metropolitan Electric Tramways Limited and to provide for the dissolution and winding-up of the Company and for other purposes.
London, Tilbury and Southend Railway Act 1904	4 Edw. 7. c. lxxii	22 July 1904
An Act to confer further powers upon the London Tilbury and Southend Railway Company.
Leicestershire and Warwickshire Electric Power Act 1904	4 Edw. 7. c. lxxiii	22 July 1904
An Act to confer further powers upon the Leicestershire and Warwickshire Electric Power Company and for other purposes.
Manchester Ship Canal (Finance) Act 1904 (repealed)	4 Edw. 7. c. lxxiv	22 July 1904
An Act to confirm and give effect to arrangements between the Corporation of Manchester and the Manchester Ship Canal Company with respect to the financial relations between the two bodies and to empower the Manchester Ship Canal Company to raise further money by borrowing and to create additional capital and for other purposes. (Repealed by Manchester Ship Canal Harbour Revision Order 2009 (SI 2009/2579))
Preston Corporation Water Act 1904 (repealed)	4 Edw. 7. c. lxxv	22 July 1904
An Act to confer further powers on the Corporation of Preston with reference to their Water Undertaking and for other purposes. (Repealed by County of Lancashire Act 1984 (c. xxi))
Shipley Urban District Council Act 1904 (repealed)	4 Edw. 7. c. lxxvi	22 July 1904
An Act to authorise the Urban District Council of Shipley to purchase the Gas Undertaking of Sir Titus Salt Bait. Sons and Company Limited and to acquire Land construct Street Works consolidate their loans and borrow money and for other purposes. (Repealed by West Yorkshire Act 1980 (c. xiv))
Derbyshire and Nottinghamshire Electric Power Act 1904	4 Edw. 7. c. lxxvii	22 July 1904
An Act to confer further powers upon the Derbyshire and Nottinghamshire Electric Electric Power Company and for other purposes.
Great Northern Railway Act 1904	4 Edw. 7. c. lxxviii	22 July 1904
An Act to confer powers on the Great Northern Railway Company with reference to the construction of Works and the purchase of Lands to extend the time limited for the compulsory purchase of certain Lands by the Company to empower the Company and the Great Central Railway Company to purchase Lands and to extend the time for the compulsory purchase of certain Lands by those Companies and for other purposes.
Matlock and District Gas Act 1904	4 Edw. 7. c. lxxix	22 July 1904
An Act for incorporating and conferring powers upon the Matlock and District Gas Company and for other purposes.
Ticehurst and District Water and Gas Act 1904 or the Ticehurst and District Gas Act 1904 (repealed)	4 Edw. 7. c. lxxx	22 July 1904
An Act for amalgamating the undertakings of the Ticehurst and Robertsbridge Water Company and the Wadhurst Ticehurst and District Gas Light and Coke Company for extending their limits of supply for authorising the construction of works and the raising of additional capital and for other purposes. (Repealed by Wadhurst and District Gas Act 1914 (4 & 5 Geo. 5. c. cliii))
London and North Western Railway Act 1904	4 Edw. 7. c. lxxxi	22 July 1904
An Act for conferring further Powers upon the London and North Western Railway Company in relation to their own Undertaking and upon that Company and the Great Western Railway Company in relation to their Joint Undertaking and for other purposes.
Baker Street and Waterloo Railway Act 1904	4 Edw. 7. c. lxxxii	22 July 1904
An Act to authorise the Baker Street and Waterloo Railway Company to acquire Additional Lands to confer further Powers and for other purposes.
Brymbo Water Act 1904	4 Edw. 7. c. lxxxiii	22 July 1904
An Act to authorise the Brymbo Water Company to extend their Limits of Supply to raise additional Capital and for other purposes.
Great Central and Midland Railways Act 1904	4 Edw. 7. c. lxxxiv	22 July 1904
An Act to constitute as a separate undertaking certain railways of the Sheffield and Midland Railway Companies' Joint Committee and certain other railways authorised to be constructed by the Great Central and Midland Railway Companies jointly and for other purposes.
Humber Commercial Railway and Dock Act 1904	4 Edw. 7. c. lxxxv	22 July 1904
An Act to empower the Humber Commercial Railway and Dock Company to construct a new dock with connecting railway and other works and entrance into the River Humber to abandon the dock and works authorized by the Humber Commercial Railway and Dock Act 1901 (Note: Humber Commercial Railway and Dock Act 1901) and for other purposes.
Southend-on-Sea Gas Act 1904	4 Edw. 7. c. lxxxvi	22 July 1904
An Act for conferring further powers on the Southend Gas Company.
Saint Mary Woolnoth Church Act 1904	4 Edw. 7. c. lxxxvii	22 July 1904
An Act to provide for the payment to the Ecclesiastical Commissioners and application by them of moneys, payable under the City and South London Railway Act 1896 (Note: City and South London Railway Act 1896 (59 & 60 Vict. c. cclii)) by the City and South London Railway Company in respect of the church of Saint Mary Woolnoth in the city of London and for other purposes.
Minehead Urban District Council Act 1904	4 Edw. 7. c. lxxxviii	22 July 1904
An Act to provide for the transfer of the Undertaking of the Minehead Waterworks Company Limited to the Minehead Urban District Council and to confer further powers on the said Council with respect to the supply of Water and for other purposes.
Clyde Valley Electrical Power Act 1904 (repealed)	4 Edw. 7. c. lxxxix	22 July 1904
An Act to confer further powers on the Clyde Valley Electrical Power Company and for other purposes. (Repealed by South of Scotland Electricity Order Confirmation Act 1956 (4 & 5 Eliz. 2. c. xciv))
Birkdale Improvement Act 1904	4 Edw. 7. c. xc	22 July 1904
An Act to authorise the Urban District Council of Birkdale to make further provision in regard to the Health Local Government Improvement and Finance of the Urban District and for other purposes.
South Suburban Gas Act 1904 (repealed)	4 Edw. 7. c. xci	22 July 1904
An Act to change the name of the Crystal Palace District Gas Company to the South Suburban Gas Company and to confer further powers on the Company. (Repealed by South Suburban Gas Act 1928 (18 & 19 Geo. 5. c. lxxx))
Southport and Lytham Tramroad Act 1904	4 Edw. 7. c. xcii	22 July 1904
An Act to extend the time for taking certain lands and for the construction of certain authorised works by the Southport and Lytham Tramroad Company and the Mayor Aldermen and Burgesses of the borough of Southport to authorise the raising of further capital and for other purposes.
City of London (Central Criminal Court House) Act 1904 (repealed)	4 Edw. 7. c. xciii	22 July 1904
An Act to authorise the raising by borrowing of money for the provision and erection of premises for the Sessions of the Central Criminal Court. (Repealed by Statute Law (Repeals) Act 2008 (c. 12))
Filey Improvement Act 1904	4 Edw. 7. c. xciv	22 July 1904
An Act to confer further powers on the Urban District Council of Filey in the East Riding of the County of York in relation to their gas and water undertakings and in relation to the seashore and to make further and better provision for the improvement health local government and finance of the district and for other purposes.
Maidenhead Bridge Act 1904	4 Edw. 7. c. xcv	22 July 1904
An Act to free Maidenhead Bridge from tolls to enable the Corporation of Maidenhead to borrow money for discharging the mortgage debt on the bridge for vesting the Bridge Estates in the Corporation and for other purposes in connection therewith.
Great Central Railway Act 1904	4 Edw. 7. c. xcvi	22 July 1904
An Act to authorise the construction of new Works and the acquisition of Lands by the Great Central Railway Company in connection with their undertaking the construction of new Railways by the Cheshire Lines Committee and the Seaforth and Sefton Junction Railway Company respectively and the acquisition of Lands by the Great Western and Great Central Railways Joint Committee and the Manchester South Junction and Altrincham Railway Company respectively in connection with their respective undertakings the acquisition by the Great Central Railway Company of the Undertakings of the Wrexham Mold and Connah's Quay and Buckley Railway Companies and for other purposes.
London County Council (Money) Act 1904 (repealed)	4 Edw. 7. c. xcvii	22 July 1904
An Act to regulate the expenditure of money by the London County Council on capital account during the current financial period and the raising of money to meet such expenditure and for other purposes. (Repealed by London County Council (Finance Consolidation) Act 1912 (2 & 3 Geo. 5. c. cv))
Plymouth Corporation Act 1904 (repealed)	4 Edw. 7. c. xcviii	22 July 1904
An Act to confer further borrowing powers upon the Mayor Aldermen and Burgesses of the borough of Plymouth. (Repealed by Plymouth Corporation Act 1915 (5 & 6 Geo. 5. c. lxix))
Wolverhampton Corporation Act 1904 (repealed)	4 Edw. 7. c. xcix	22 July 1904
An Act to empower the Corporation of Wolverhampton to construct tramways and to make further provision in regard to their tramway electricity and market undertakings and the health local government and improvement of their borough and for other purposes. (Repealed by Wolverhampton Corporation Act 1969 (c. lx))
Liverpool and Wigan Churches Act 1904	4 Edw. 7. c. c	22 July 1904
An Act to authorise the closing and sale of certain Churches in the City of Liverpool and the Borough of Wigan and the sale of certain Vicarages or houses of residence the extinction of certain Ecclesiastical Districts and Parishes the merger thereof in other Districts and Parishes and the conversion of certain Ecclesiastical Districts into separate Ecclesiastical Parishes in the said City and for other purposes.
Barrow-in-Furness Corporation Act 1904	4 Edw. 7. c. ci	22 July 1904
An Act to empower the Corporation of Barrow-in-Furness to construct an opening bridge across Walney Channel to make certain street works to lay down additional tramways and to execute works in connection with their water undertaking and for other purposes.
Richard Jaeger's Patent Act 1904	4 Edw. 7. c. cii	22 July 1904
An Act for rendering valid certain Letters Patent granted to Richard Jaeger in respect of an invention for an improved process for the dry slaking of lime and apparatus therefor.
Doncaster Corporation Act 1904	4 Edw. 7. c. ciii	22 July 1904
An Act to confer further powers upon the Mayor Aldermen and Burgesses of the Borough of Doncaster with reference to their Water and Gas Undertakings to make further and better provision with regard to the improvement health local government and finance of the said Borough and for other purposes.
Skipton Water and Improvement Act 1904	4 Edw. 7. c. civ	22 July 1904
An Act to authorise the Urban District Council of Skipton to construct additional Waterworks and to make further provision with regard to the supply of electricity and for the improvement health local government and finance of the district and for other purposes.
Soothill Nether Urban District Tramways Act 1904	4 Edw. 7. c. cv	22 July 1904
An Act to enable the Soothill Nether Urban District Council to make and maintain Tramways and Street Improvements to acquire land for the purpose of a refuse destructor and for other purposes.
Llanelly Harbour Act 1904	4 Edw. 7. c. cvi	22 July 1904
An Act to change the name of the Llanelly Harbour and Burry Navigation Commissioners to the Llanelly Harbour Trust and to alter the constitution of the Trust to revive and extend the powers for the compulsory purchase of lands and for the execution of works under the Llanelly Harbour Acts 1896 (Note: Llanelly Harbour Act 1896 (59 & 60 Vict. c. clxxxvi)) and 1901 (Note: Llanelly Harbour Act 1901 (1 Edw. 7. c. cclxvi)) and otherwise amend those Acts to empower the Trust to borrow moneys with the consent of the Urban District Council of Llanelly and otherwise to alter and extend the financial powers of the Trust and for other purposes.
Tynemouth Corporation Act 1904 (repealed)	4 Edw. 7. c. cvii	22 July 1904
An Act to increase the number of the Wards and of the Council of the Borough of Tynemouth and for other purposes. (Repealed by Tyne and Wear Act 1980 (c.xliii))
Great Eastern Railway (General Powers) Act 1904	4 Edw. 7. c. cviii	22 July 1904
An Act for conferring further powers on the Great Eastern Railway Company and for other purposes.
North Western Electricity and Power-Gas Act 1904	4 Edw. 7. c. cix	22 July 1904
An Act for conferring further powers on the North Western Electricity and Power-Gas Company and for other purposes.
Charing Cross, Euston and Hampstead Railway Act 1904	4 Edw. 7. c. cx	22 July 1904
An Act for conferring further powers upon the Charing Cross Euston and Hampstead Railway Company and for other purposes.
Education Board Provisional Order Confirmation (Swansea) Act 1904	4 Edw. 7. c. cxi	22 July 1904
An Act to confirm a Provisional Order made by the Board of Education under Sections 17 (7) and 21 of the Education Act 1902 (Note: Education Act 1902 (2 Edw. 7. c. 42)) relating to the County Borough of Swansea.
	Swansea Order 1904 Provisional Order made by the Board of Education under Sections 17 (7) and 21 of the Education Act 1902 for the establishment and constitution of an Education Committee for the Council of the County Borough of Swansea under the said Act.	
Education Board Provisional Order Confirmation (London) Act 1904	4 Edw. 7. c. cxii	22 July 1904
An Act to confirm a Provisional Order made by the Board of Education under the Education Acts 1870 to 1903 to enable the School Board for London to put in force the Lands Clauses Acts.
	London Order 1904 Provisional Order for putting in force the Lands Clauses Acts.	
Education Board Provisional Order Confirmation (Birmingham) Act 1904	4 Edw. 7. c. cxiii	22 July 1904
An Act to confirm a Provisional Order made by the Board of Education under the Education Acts 1870 to 1903 to enable the Council of the City and County Borough of Birmingham to put in force the Land Clauses Acts.
	Birmingham Order 1904 Provisional Order for putting in force the Lands Clauses Acts.	
Education Board Provisional order Confirmation (Cardiff) Act 1904	4 Edw. 7. c. cxiv	22 July 1904
An Act to confirm a Provisional Order made by the Board of Education under Sections 17 (7) and 21 of the Education Act 1902 relating to the County Borough of Cardiff.
	County Borough of Cardiff Order 1904 Provisional Order made by the Board of Education under Sections 17 (7) and 21 of the Education Act 1902 for the establishment and constitution of an Education Committee for the Council of the County Borough of Cardiff under the said Act.	
Local Government Board's Provisional Order Confirmation (No. 4) Act 1904	4 Edw. 7. c. cxv	22 July 1904
An Act to confirm a Provisional Order of the Local Government Board relating to Portsmouth.
	Portsmouth (Extension) Order 1904 Provisional Order made in pursuance of Sections 54 and 59 of the Local Government Act 1888. (Note: Local Government Act 1888 (51 & 52 Vict. c. 41))	
Local Government Board's Provisional Orders Confirmation (No. 5) Act 1904	4 Edw. 7. c. cxvi	22 July 1904
An Act to confirm certain Provisional Orders of the Local Government Board relating to Bradford (Yorkshire) Ealing Eaton Bray (Rural) Glastonbury Rhyl and the Fylde Water Board District.
	Bradford (Yorkshire) Order 1904 Provisional Order to enable the Urban Sanitary Authority for the City of Bradford (Yorks) to put in force the Compulsory Clauses of the Lands Clauses Acts.	
	Ealing Order 1904 Provisional Order to enable the Urban District Council for the Borough of Ealing to put in force the Compulsory Clauses of the Lands Clauses Acts.	
	Eaton Bray Rural Order 1904 Provisional Order to enable the Rural District Council of Eaton Bray to put in force the Compulsory Clauses of the Lands Clauses Acts.	
	Fylde Order 1904 Provisional Order for altering the Fylde Water Board Act 1899. (Note: Fylde Water Board Act 1899 (62 & 63 Vict. c. ccxliii))	
	Glastonbury Order 1904 Provisional Order for altering the Glastonbury Corporation Gas Act 1900. (Note: Glastonbury Corporation Gas Act 1900 (63 & 64 Vict. c. xxxv))	
	Rhyl Order 1904 Provisional Order for altering certain Local Acts.	
Local Government Board's Provisional Orders Confirmation (No. 6) Act 1904	4 Edw. 7. c. cxvii	22 July 1904
An Act to confirm certain Provisional Orders of the Local Government Board relating to the County Palatine of Lancaster and the Counties of Rutland and Surrey.
	County of Lancaster Order 1904 Provisional Order to enable the County Council of the County Palatine of Lancaster to put in force the Compulsory Clauses of the Lands Clauses Acts.	
	County of Rutland Order 1904 Provisional Order made in pursuance of sub-section (2) of Section 69 of the Local Government Act 1888.	
	County of Surrey Order 1904 Provisional Order made in pursuance of sub-section (2) of Section 69 of the Local Government Act 1888.	
Local Government Board's Provisional Orders Confirmation (No. 7) Act 1904	4 Edw. 7. c. cxviii	22 July 1904
An Act to confirm certain Provisional Orders of the Local Government Board relating to Godalming Haworth Northallerton and Tipton.
	Godalming Order 1904 Provisional Order for altering the Godalming Corporation Water Act 1899. (Note: Godalming Corporation Water Act 1899 (62 & 63 Vict. c. ccix))	
	Haworth Order 1904 Provisional Order for partially repealing the Haworth Local Board of Health Act 1872. (Note: Haworth Local Board of Health Act 1872 (35 & 36 Vict. c. cvii))	
	Northallerton Order 1904 Provisional Order for partially repealing and altering the Northallerton Waterworks Act 1891. (Note: Northallerton Waterworks Act 1891 (54 & 55 Vict. c. cxxxiv))	
	Tipton Gas Order 1904 Provisional Order for altering the Tipton Local Board (Gas) Act 1876. (Note: Tipton Local Board (Gas) Act 1876 (39 & 40 Vict. c. cxlviii))	
Local Government Board's Provisional Orders Confirmation (No. 8) Act 1904	4 Edw. 7. c. cxix	22 July 1904
An Act to confirm certain Provisional Orders of the Local Government Board relating to Kingswood West Ham and the Knighton and Teme the North East Durham and the South Shields Rural and Southwick-on-Wear Joint Hospital Districts.
	Kingswood Order 1904 Provisional Order to enable the Urban District Council of Kingswood to put in force the Compulsory Clauses of the Lands Clauses Acts.	
	Knighton and Teme Joint Hospital Order 1904 Provisional Order for forming a United District under Section 279 of the Public Health Act 1875.	
	North East Durham Joint Small-pox Hospital Order 1904 Provisional Order for forming a United District under Section 279 of the Public Health Act 1875.	
	South Shields Rural and Southwick-on-Wear Joint Hospital Order 1904 Provisional Order for altering a Confirming Act. (Note: Local Government Board's Provisional Orders Confirmation (No. 11) Act 1903 (3 Edw. 7. c. lxiv))	
	West Ham Order 1904 Provisional Order to enable the Urban Sanitary Authority for the Borough of West Ham to put in force the Compulsory Clauses of the Lands Clauses Acts.	
Local Government Board's Provisional Orders Confirmation (No. 12) Act 1904	4 Edw. 7. c. cxx	22 July 1904
An Act to confirm certain Provisional Orders of the Local Government Board relating to the Ashton-under-Lyne and District the Congleton and District and the Wath Swinton and District Joint Hospital Districts.
	Ashton-under-Lyne and District Joint Small-pox Hospital Order 1904 Provisional Order for forming a United District under Section 279 of the Public Health Act 1875.	
	Congleton and District Joint Hospital Order 1904 Provisional Order for forming a United District under Section 279 of the Public Health Act 1875.	
	Wath, Swinton and District Joint Hospital Order 1904 Provisional Order for altering Confirming Acts.	
Local Government Board's Provisional Orders Confirmation (No. 14) Act 1904	4 Edw. 7. c. cxxi	22 July 1904
An Act to confirm certain Provisional Orders of the Local Government Board relating to Brighouse Pwllheli Wath upon Dearne and Worthing and the North Staffordshire Joint Small-pox Hospital District.
	Brighouse Order 1904 Provisional Order for partially altering the Brighouse Corporation Act 1895. (Note: Brighouse Corporation Act 1895 (58 & 59 Vict. c. cxxviii))	
	North Staffordshire Joint Smallpox Hospital Order 1904 Provisional Order for altering a Confirming Act.	
	Pwllheli Order 1904 Provisional Order for altering the Pwllheli Corporation Act 1897. (Note: Pwllheli Corporation Act 1897 (60 & 61 Vict. c. ccv))	
	Wath-upon-Dearne Order 1904 Provisional Order for altering the Wath-upon-Dearne Urban District Council (Water) Act 1898. (Note: Wath-upon-Dearne Urban District Council (Water) Act 1898 (61 & 62 Vict. c. ccxxxviii))	
	Worthing Order 1904 Provisional Order for altering the West Worthing Improvement Act 1865 (Note: West Worthing Improvement Act 1865) and a Confirming Act. (Note: Local Government Board's Provisional Orders Confirmation (No. 15) Act 1893 (56 & 57 Vict. c. clxxxix))	
Local Government Board's Provisional Order Confirmation (No. 15) Act 1904 (repealed)	4 Edw. 7. c. cxxii	22 July 1904
An Act to confirm a Provisional Order of the Local Government Board relating to Cardiff. (Repealed by County of South Glamorgan Act 1976 (c. xxxv))
	Cardiff Order 1904 Provisional Order for altering the Cardiff Corporation Act 1894. (Note: Cardiff Corporation Act 1894 (57 & 58 Vict. c. clxi))	
Local Government Board's Provisional Orders Confirmation (Gas) Act 1904	4 Edw. 7. c. cxxiii	22 July 1904
An Act to confirm certain Provisional Orders of the Local Government Board relating to East Dereham and Neyland.
	East Dereham Gas Order 1904 Provisional Order under the Gas and Water Works Facilities Act 1870 (Note: Gas and Water Works Facilities Act 1870 (33 & 34 Vict. c. 70)) and the Gas and Water Works Facilities Act 1870 Amendment Act 1873. (Note: Gas and Water Works Facilities Act 1870 Amendment Act 1873 (36 & 37 Vict. c. 89))	
	Neyland Gas Order 1904 Provisional Order under the Gas and Water Works Facilities Act 1870.	
Local Government Board (Ireland) Provisional Orders Confirmation (No. 2) Act 1904	4 Edw. 7. c. cxxiv	22 July 1904
An Act to confirm certain Provisional Orders of the Local Government Board for Ireland relating to the Bangor and Newtownards and the County of Cork United Districts and the Ports of New Ross and Waterford.
	Bangor and Newtownards Joint Hospital Order 1904 Provisional Order.	
	Cork Sanatorium for Consumptives Order 1904 Provisional Order.	
	Waterford and New Ross Port Sanitary Order 1904 Provisional Order.	
Local Government Board (Ireland) Provisional Orders Confirmation (No. 4) Act 1904	4 Edw. 7. c. cxxv	22 July 1904
An Act to confirm certain Provisional Orders of the Local Government Board for Ireland relating to the Rural Districts of Rathdown (No. 1) and Rathdown (No. 2).
	Rathdown Union (Sewerage) Order 1904 Provisional Order to enable the Council of the Rural District of Rathdown (No. 1) to put in force the Compulsory Clauses of the Lands Clauses Acts.	
	Greystones Sewerage Order 1904 Provisional Order to enable the Council of the Rural District of Rathdown (No. 2) to put in force the Compulsory Clauses of the Lands Clauses Acts.	
Commons Regulation (Merrow) Provisional Order Confirmation Act 1904 (repealed)	4 Edw. 7. c. cxxvi	22 July 1904
An Act to confirm a Provisional Order under the Inclosure Acts 1845 to 1899 relating to Merrow Downs in the Parish of Merrow in the County of Surrey. (Repealed by Guildford Corporation Act 1967 (c. xxviii))
	Provisional Order for the Regulation of Merrow Downs.	
Commons Regulation (Oxshott) Provisional Order Act 1904	4 Edw. 7. c. cxxvii	22 July 1904
An Act to confirm a Provisional Order under the Inclosure Acts 1845 to 1899 relating to Oxshott Heath in the Parish of Cobham in the County of Surrey.
Land Drainage Provisional Order Confirmation Act 1904	4 Edw. 7. c. cxxviii	22 July 1904
An Act to confirm a Provisional Order under the Land Drainage Act 1861 (Note: Land Drainage Act 1861 (24 & 25 Vict. c. 133)) relating to lands in the Parishes of Owston and West Butterwick in the County of Lincoln (Parts of Lindsey).
	Lincoln Drainage Order 1904 In the matter of the proposed Separate Drainage District of Newland (Epworth) in the parishes of Owston and West Butterwick in the county of Lincoln (Parts of Lindsey).	
Drainage and Improvement of Lands Supplemental (Ireland) Act 1904	4 Edw. 7. c. cxxix	22 July 1904
An Act to confirm a Provisional Order under the Drainage and Improvement of Lands Act (Ireland) 1863 (Note: Drainage and Improvement of Lands Act (Ireland) 1863 (26 & 27 Vict. c. 88)) and the Acts amending the same relating to the Farney Bridge and Ballynahow Drainage District in the County of Tipperary.
	Farney Bridge and Ballynahow (County Tipperary) Drainage District Order 1904 In the matter of the Farney Bridge and Ballynahow Drainage District in the county of Tipperary.	
Pier and Harbour Order Confirmation (No. 1) Act 1904	4 Edw. 7. c. cxxx	22 July 1904
An Act to confirm a Provisional Order made by the Board of Trade under the General Pier and Harbour Act 1861 (Note: General Pier and Harbour Act 1861 (24 & 25 Vict. c. 45)) relating to Wexford.
	Wexford Harbour Order 1904 Provisional Order for amending the Wexford Harbour Act 1874 (Note: Wexford Harbour Act 1874 (37 & 38 Vict. c. xl)) in regard to the Election of certain Commissioners.	
Electric Lighting Orders Confirmation (No. 5) Act 1904	4 Edw. 7. c. cxxxi	22 July 1904
An Act to confirm certain Provisional Orders made by the Board of Trade under the Electric Lighting Acts 1882 and 1888 the Electric Lighting (Scotland) Act 1890 (Note: Electric Lighting (Scotland) Act 1890 (53 & 54 Vict. c. 13)) and the Electric Lighting (Scotland) Act 1902 (Note: Electric Lighting (Scotland) Act 1902 (2 Edw. 7. c. 35)) relating to Musselburgh Portpatrick and Wishaw.
	Musselburgh Electric Lighting Order 1904 Provisional Order granted by the Board of Trade under the Electric Lighting Acts 1882 and 1888 the Electric Lighting (Scotland) Act 1890 and the Electric Lighting (Scotland) Act 1902 to the National Electric Construction Company Limited in respect of the Burgh of Musselburgh in the County of Edinburgh.	
	Portpatrick Electric Lighting Order 1904 Provisional Order granted by the Board of Trade under the Electric Lighting Acts 1882 and 1888 the Electric Lighting (Scotland) Act 1890 and the Electric Lighting (Scotland) Act 1902 to the Portpatrick Electric Supply Company Limited in respect of part of the Parish of Portpatrick in the County of Wigtown.	
	Wishaw Electric Lighting Order 1904 Provisional Order granted by the Board of Trade under the Electric Lighting Acts 1882 and 1888 the Electric Lighting (Scotland) Act 1890 and the Electric Lighting (Scotland) Act 1902 to the Provost Magistrates and Councillors of the Burgh of Wishaw in respect of the Burgh of Wishaw in the County of Lanark.	
Canal Rates and Charges (Regent's Canal) Order Confirmation Act 1904	4 Edw. 7. c. cxxxii	22 July 1904
An Act to confirm a Provisional Order made by the Board of Trade under the Railway and Canal Traffic Act 1888 (Note: Railway and Canal Traffic Act 1888 (51 & 52 Vict. c. 25)) containing the Schedule of Maximum Rates and Charges applicable to the Regent's Canal.
	Canal Rates and Charges (Regent's Canal) Order 1904 Order of the Board of Trade under the Railway and Canal Traffic Act 1888 embodying the authorised Schedule of Maximum Rates and Charges applicable to the Regent's Canal.	
Motherwell and Bellshill Railway (Abandonment) Order Confirmation Act 1904 (repealed)	4 Edw. 7. c. cxxxiii	22 July 1904
An Act to confirm a Provisional Order under the Private Legislation Procedure (Scotland) Act 1899 relating to Motherwell and Bellshill Railway (Abandonment). (Repealed by Statute Law (Repeals) Act 2013 (c. 2))
	Motherwell and Bellshill Railway (Abandonment) Order 1904 Provisional Order for the abandonment of the Motherwell and Bellshill Railway and for other purposes.	
North British Railway (General Powers) Order Confirmation Act 1904	4 Edw. 7. c. cxxxiv	22 July 1904
An Act to confirm a Provisional Order under the Private Legislation Procedure (Scotland) Act 1899 relating to the North British Railway.
	North British Railway (General Powers) Order 1904 Provisional Order to authorise the North British Railway Company to construct a new railway at Inverkeithing and to enter into agreements with the Admiralty as to the sale or use of such railway to acquire and to hold additional lands to extend the time for the purchase of lands and for the completion of certain railways to raise additional capital and for other purposes.	
Paisley District Tramways Order Confirmation Act 1904	4 Edw. 7. c. cxxxv	22 July 1904
An Act to confirm a Provisional Order under the Private Legislation Procedure (Scotland) Act 1899 relating to Paisley District Tramways.
	Paisley District Tramways Order 1904 Provisional Order to extend the time limited by the Paisley District Tramways Order 1901 for the completion of the Tramways thereby authorised and for other purposes.	
Leith Burgh Order Confirmation Act 1904 (repealed)	4 Edw. 7. c. cxxxvi	22 July 1904
An Act to confirm a Provisional Order under the Private Legislation Procedure (Scotland) Act 1899 relating to the Burgh of Leith. (Repealed by Edinburgh Corporation Order Confirmation Act 1933 (24 & 25 Geo. 5. c. v))
	Leith Burgh Order 1904 Provisional Order to confer further powers on the Provost Magistrates and Councillors of the Burgh of Leith.	
Airdrie Corporation Gas Order Confirmation Act 1904	4 Edw. 7. c. cxxxvii	22 July 1904
An Act to confirm a Provisional Order under the Private Legislation Procedure (Scotland) Act 1899 relating to Airdrie Corporation Gas.
	Airdrie Corporation Gas Order 1904 Provisional Order to empower the Provost Magistrates and Councillors of the Burgh of Airdrie to supply Gas and to purchase the Undertaking of the Airdrie Gas Light Company and portion of the Mains and Pipes of the Coatbridge Gas Company and for other purposes.	
Wishaw Corporation Order Confirmation Act 1904	4 Edw. 7. c. cxxxviii	22 July 1904
An Act to confirm a Provisional Order under the Private Legislation Procedure (Scotland) Act 1899 relating to Wishaw Corporation.
	Wishaw Corporation Order 1904 Provisional Order to confer further borrowing powers on the Provost Magistrates and Councillors of the Burgh of Wishaw for their water undertaking to authorise the construction of main and branch sewers and the purchase of lands for sewage purification and for other purposes.	
Leith Corporation Tramways Order Confirmation Act 1904 (repealed)	4 Edw. 7. c. cxxxix	22 July 1904
An Act to confirm a Provisional Order under the Private Legislation Procedure (Scotland) Act 1899 relating to Leith Corporation Tramways. (Repealed by Edinburgh Corporation Order Confirmation Act 1932 (22 & 23 Geo. 5. c. vii))
	Leith Corporation Tramways Order 1904 Provisional Order to authorise the Provost Magistrates and Councillors of the Burgh of Leith to acquire Tramways by agreement to construct additional Tramways and a new street and to execute street improvements and for other purposes.	
Govan Corporation Order Confirmation Act 1904	4 Edw. 7. c. cxl	22 July 1904
An Act to confirm a Provisional Order under the Private Legislation Procedure (Scotland) Act 1899 relating to the Burgh of Govan.
	Govan Corporation Order 1904 Provisional Order to confer further powers on the Town Council of the burgh of Govan and to make further provision for the police and public health and financial administration of the burgh and for other purposes.	
Caledonian Railway Order Confirmation Act 1904	4 Edw. 7. c. cxli	22 July 1904
An Act to confirm a Provisional Order tinder the Private Legislation Procedure (Scotland) Act 1899 relating to the Caledonian Railway.
	Caledonian Railway Order 1904 Provisional Order to confer further powers on the Caledonian Railway Company in relation to their Undertaking to authorise the Provost Magistrates and Town Council of the burgh of Hamilton to acquire and hold or dispose of certain lands in that burgh to extend the time for the purchase of lands and the completion of works by the Company and for other purposes.	
Glasgow and South Western Railway Order Confirmation Act 1904	4 Edw. 7. c. cxlii	22 July 1904
An Act to confirm a Provisional Order under the Private Legislation Procedure (Scotland) Act 1889 relating to the Glasgow and South Western Railway.
	Glasgow and South Western Railway Order 1904 Provisional Order for conferring further powers on the Glasgow and South Western Railway Company for the construction of works and the acquisition of lands and in relation to Troon Harbour for conferring further powers upon the Ayr Harbour Trustees with respect to the issue of debenture stock by the said Trustees for empowering the said Company to raise additional capital and for other purposes.	
Aberdeen Joint Passenger Station Order Confirmation Act 1904	4 Edw. 7. c. cxliii	1 August 1904
An Act to confirm a Provisional Order under the Private Legislation Procedure (Scotland) Act 1899 relating to Aberdeen Joint Passenger Station.
	Aberdeen Joint Passenger Station Order 1904 Provisional Order to extend the time limited by the Aberdeen Joint Passenger Station Act 1899 (Note: Aberdeen Joint Passenger Station Act 1899 (62 & 63 Vict. c. ccxvi)) for the completion of certain works authorised by that Act to confirm the purchase of lands at Aberdeen by the Great North of Scotland Railway Company to enable that Company and the Caledonian Railway Company to enter into agreements with reference to such lands and for other purposes.	
Dunbartonshire (Vale of Leven) Water Order Confirmation Act 1904	4 Edw. 7. c. cxliv	1 August 1904
An Act to confirm a Provisional Order under the Private Legislation Procedure (Scotland) Act 1899 relating to Dunbartonshire (Vale of Leven) Water.
	Dunbartonshire (Vale of Leven) Water Order 1904 Provisional Order to authorise the construction and maintenance of additional Waterworks for the supply of the Vale of Leven Special Water Supply District in the County of Dunbarton and for other purposes.	
Arbroath Corporation Water Order Confirmation Act 1904	4 Edw. 7. c. cxlv	1 August 1904
An Act to confirm a Provisional Order under the Private Legislation Procedure (Scotland) Act 1899 relating to Arbroath Corporation Water.
	Arbroath Corporation Water Order 1904 Provisional Order to authorise the Provost Magistrates and Councillors of the Burgh of Aberbrothock or Arbroath to provide an additional supply of water and to construct and maintain new waterworks and for other purposes.	
Dunfermline District Water Order Confirmation Act 1904	4 Edw. 7. c. cxlvi	1 August 1904
An Act to confirm a Provisional Order under the Private Legislation Procedure (Scotland) Act 1899 relating to Dunfermline District Water.
	Dunfermline District Water Order 1904 Provisional Order to empower the Dunfermline District Committee of the County Council of the County of Fife to construct waterworks and supply water within their district and the said County Council for the purposes thereof to acquire lands and servitudes and to levy assessments and borrow money and for other purposes.	
Melrose District Water Order Confirmation Act 1904	4 Edw. 7. c. cxlvii	1 August 1904
An Act to confirm a Provisional Order under the Private Legislation Procedure (Scotland) Act 1899 relating to Melrose District Water.
	Melrose District Water Order 1904 Provisional Order to empower the Melrose District Committee of the County Council of the County of Roxburgh to construct and maintain waterworks and to supply water within their district and to authorise the County Council of the County of Roxburgh to acquire lands and servitudes for the purposes of such water supply and to authorise and require the said County Council to levy assessments and to borrow money for such waterworks and supply and for other purposes.	
Scotch Education Department Provisional Order Confirmation (Edinburgh) Act 1904 (repealed)	4 Edw. 7. c. cxlviii	1 August 1904
An Act to confirm a Provisional Order made by the Scotch Education Department under the Education (Scotland) Act 1878 (Note: Education (Scotland) Act 1878 (41 & 42 Vict. c. 78)) to enable the School Board of the Burgh of Edinburgh to put in force the Lands Clauses Acts. (Repealed by Statute Law (Repeals) Act 1998 (c. 43))
	Edinburgh Order 1904 Provisional Order for putting in force the Lands Clauses Acts.	
Lancashire and Yorkshire Railway (Various Powers) Act 1904	4 Edw. 7. c. cxlix	1 August 1904
An Act to authorise the Lancashire and Yorkshire Railway Company to construct new Railways to widen certain existing Railways and to construct other Works to acquire additional Lands and to raise Additional Capital and for other purposes.
Thurles Urban District Council Water Act 1904	4 Edw. 7. c. cl	1 August 1904
An Act to authorise the Urban District Council of Thurles in the County of Tipperary to construct Waterworks for the supply of the District and for other purposes.
Ebbw Vale Water Act 1904	4 Edw. 7. c. cli	1 August 1904
An Act to authorise the Urban District Council of Ebbw Vale to construct additional Waterworks and for other purposes.
Harrogate Waterworks Tramroad Act 1904 (repealed)	4 Edw. 7. c. clii	1 August 1904
An Act to empower the Corporation of Harrogate to construct a temporary tramroad telephonic communication and other works in connection with their Waterworks and for other purposes. (Repealed by Claro Water Board Order 1958 (SI 1958/1808))
Bournemouth Corporation Act 1904 (repealed)	4 Edw. 7. c. cliii	1 August 1904
An Act to empower the Mayor Aldermen and Burgesses of the borough of Bournemouth to construct further tramways and to acquire the undertaking of the Tuckton Bridge Company and for other purposes. (Repealed by Bournemouth Borough Council Act 1985 (c. v))
Metropolitan District Railway Act 1904	4 Edw. 7. c. cliv	1 August 1904
An Act to confer further powers upon the Metropolitan District Railway Company and for other purposes.
Lytham Improvement Act 1904 (repealed)	4 Edw. 7. c. clv	1 August 1904
An Act to authorise the Urban District Council of Lytham to provide a Town Hall to make further provision in regard to their Gas Undertaking and to the Health Local Government and Improvement of their District and for other purposes. (Repealed by Lytham St. Anne's Corporation Act 1923 (13 & 14 Geo. 5. c. lxxxvi))
Dean Forest (Mines) Act 1904	4 Edw. 7. c. clvi	15 August 1904
An Act to facilitate the opening and working of certain of the lower series of Coal Seams in His Majesty's Forest of Dean and in the Hundred of St. Briavels in the County of Gloucester and for certain other purposes connected with the Mines in the said Forest and Hundred.
County of Suffolk Act 1904	4 Edw. 7. c. clvii	15 August 1904
An Act to make better provision for the administration of Justice at Sessions of the Peace and for the transaction of County business in the County of Suffolk.
Post Office (Sites) Act 1904 (repealed)	4 Edw. 7. c. clviii	15 August 1904
An Act to enable His Majesty's Postmaster-General to acquire lands in London Southgate Blackpool Leeds and Newcastle-upon-Tyne for the Public Service and for other purposes. (Repealed by Postal Services Act 2000 (Consequential Modifications to Local Enactments) Order 2003 (SI 2003/1542))
Local Government Board's Provisional Orders Confirmation (No. 9) Act 1904	4 Edw. 7. c. clix	15 August 1904
An Act to confirm certain Provisional Orders of the Local Government Board relating to Bolton Congleton Keighley Newton-in-Mackerfield Oswestry and Wisbech.
	Bolton Order 1904 Provisional Order for altering certain Local Acts and a Confirming Act. (Note: Local Government Board's Provisional Orders Confirmation (No. 15) Act 1894 (57 & 58 Vict. c. cxciii))	
	Congleton Order 1904 Provisional Order for altering the Congleton Gas and Improvement Act 1866. (Note: Congleton Gas and Improvement Act 1866 (29 & 30 Vict. c. lii))	
	Keighley Order 1904 Provisional Order for partially altering the Keighley Corporation Act 1891. (Note: Keighley Corporation Act 1891 (54 & 55 Vict. c. cxcix))	
	Newton in Mackerfield Order 1904 Provisional Order for altering the Newton District Improvement Act 1855 (Note: Newton District Improvement Act 1855 (18 & 19 Vict. c. c)) and certain Confirming Acts.	
	Oswestry Order 1904 Provisional Order for partially repealing and altering the Oswestry (Corporation) Water and Markets Act 1885. (Note: Oswestry (Corporation) Water and Markets Act 1885 (48 & 49 Vict. c. xliii))	
	Wisbech Order 1904 Provisional Order for partially repealing and altering the Wisbech Improvement Act 1810. (Note: Wisbech Improvement, Cattle Market and Harbour Act 1810 (50 Geo. 3. c. ccvi))	
Local Government Board's Provisional Orders Confirmation (No. 10) Act 1904	4 Edw. 7. c. clx	15 August 1904
An Act to confirm certain Provisional Orders of the Local Government Board relating to Chiswick East Ham Great Crosby and York.
	Chiswick Order 1904 Provisional Order to enable the Urban District Council of Chiswick to put in force the Compulsory Clauses of the Lands Clauses Acts.	
	East Ham Order 1904 Provisional Order to enable the Urban District Council of East Ham to put in force the Compulsory Clauses of the Lands Clauses Acts.	
	Great Crosby Order 1904 Provisional Order to enable the Urban District Council of Great Crosby to put in force the Compulsory Clauses of the Lands Clauses Acts.	
	York Order 1904 Provisional Order to enable the Urban Sanitary Authority for the City of York to put in force the Compulsory Clauses of the Lands Clauses Acts.	
Local Government Board's Provisional Orders Confirmation (No. 11) Act 1904	4 Edw. 7. c. clxi	15 August 1904
An Act to confirm certain Provisional Orders of the Local Government Board relating to Guildford New Sarum and the County of Wilts.
	Guildford (Extension) Order 1904 Provisional Order made in pursuance of Sections 54 and 59 of the Local Government Act 1888.	
	New Sarum (Extension) Order 1904 Provisional Order made in pursuance of Sections 54 and 59 of the Local Government Act 1888.	
	County of Wiltshire Order 1904 Provisional Order to enable the County Council of Wilts to put in force the Compulsory Clauses of the Lands Clauses Acts.	
Local Government Board's Provisional Orders Confirmation (No. 13) Act 1904	4 Edw. 7. c. clxii	15 August 1904
An Act to confirm certain Provisional Orders of the Local Government Board relating to Blackpool Newcastle-upon-Tyne Tynemouth and Wigan.
	County Borough of Blackpool Order 1904 Provisional Order made in pursuance of Sections 54 and 59 of the Local Government Act 1888.	
	Newcastle-upon-Tyne (Extension) Order 1904 Provisional Order made in pursuance of Sections 54 and 59 of the Local Government Act 1888.	
	County Borough of Tynemouth Order 1904 Provisional Order made in pursuance of Sections 54 and 59 of the Local Government Act 1888.	
	Wigan (Extension) Order 1904 Provisional Order made in pursuance of Sections 54 and 59 of the Local Government Act 1888.	
Hamilton Gas Order Confirmation Act 1904	4 Edw. 7. c. clxiii	15 August 1904
An Act to confirm a Provisional Order under the Burgh Police (Scotland) Act 1892 (Note: Burgh Police (Scotland) Act 1892 (55 & 56 Vict. c. 55)) relating to Hamilton Gas.
	Hamilton Gas Order 1904 Provisional Order.	
Gas Orders Confirmation (No. 1) Act 1904	4 Edw. 7. c. clxiv	15 August 1904
An Act to confirm certain Provisional Orders made by the Board of Trade under the Gas and Water Works Facilities Act 1870 relating to Bognor Gas Elham Valley Gas Elstree and Boreham Wood Gas Finedon Gas and Godalming Gas.
	Bognor Gas Order 1904 Order empowering the Bognor Gas Light and Coke Company Limited to construct further works for the manufacture and storage of Gas and to raise additional Capital and for other purposes.	
	Elham Valley Gas Order 1904 Order authorising the construction and maintenance of Acetylene Gasworks and the supply of Acetylene Gas within the Parishes of Elham and Lyminge in the County of Kent.	
	Elstree and Boreham Wood Gas Order 1904 Order empowering the Elstree and Boreham Wood Gas Company Limited to raise additional capital and for other purposes.	
	Finedon Gas Order 1904 Order empowering the Finedon Gas Company Limited to maintain and continue gasworks and to manufacture and supply gas in the parish of Finedon in the county of Northampton.	
	Godalming Gas Order 1904 Order empowering the Godalming Gas and Coke Company Limited to extend their limits of supply and to raise additional capital and for other purposes.	
Gas Orders Confirmation (No. 2) Act 1904	4 Edw. 7. c. clxv	15 August 1904
An Act to confirm certain Provisional Orders made by the Board of Trade under the Gas and Water Works Facilities Act 1870 relating to Grays Gas Hedon Gas Northampton Gas Rochford Gas and Romford Gas.
	Grays Gas Order 1904 Order empowering the Grays Gas Company Limited to construct further works for the manufacture and storage of gas to raise additional capital and for other purposes.	
	Hedon and District Gas Order 1904 Order empowering the New Hedon Gas and Coke Company Limited to maintain continue and improve their existing Gasworks to construct further Works and to supply Gas within the parishes of Preston and Paull and the borough and parish of Hedon in the East Riding of the county of York.	
	Northampton Gas Order 1904 Order empowering the Northampton Gaslight Company to raise Additional Capital for the purposes of their undertaking and for other purposes.	
	Rochford Gas Order 1904 Order authorising the maintenance and continuance of existing gasworks at Rochford in the county of Essex the construction of further works on adjacent land and the manufacture and supply of gas.	
	Romford Gas Order 1904 Order empowering the Romford Gas and Coke Company Limited to raise additional capital to continue and maintain additional works and for other purposes.	
Gas Orders Confirmation (No. 3) Act 1904	4 Edw. 7. c. clxvi	15 August 1904
An Act to confirm certain Provisional Orders made by the Board of Trade under the Gas and Water Works Facilities Act 1870 relating to St. Margaret's Gas Stirling Gas Waltham Abbey and Cheshunt Gas Worsbroughdale and Worsbrough Gas and Worthing Gas.
	St. Margaret's Gas Order 1904 Order empowering the St. Margaret's Gas Company Limited to maintain and continue Gasworks to construct additional Gasworks and to supply Gas in the parish of Stanstead St. Margaret's and parts of the parishes of Great Amwell and Stanstead Abbots in the county of Hertford and in the parish of Roydon in the county of Essex and for other purposes.	
	Stirling Gas Order 1904 Order authorising the Stirling Gas Light Company to raise Additional Capital and for other purposes.	
	Waltham Abbey and Cheshunt Gas Order 1904 Order empowering the Waltham Abbey and Cheshunt Gas and Coke Company to construct and maintain additional gasworks and to raise additional capital and for other purposes.	
	Worsbroughdale and Worsbrough Gas Order 1904 Order empowering the Worsbroughdale and Worsbrough Gas Light and Coke Company Limited to maintain continue and construct gasworks and to supply gas within part of the urban district of Worsbrough and for other purposes.	
	Worthing Gas Order 1904 Order empowering the Worthing Gas Light and Coke Company to raise Additional Capital and for other purposes.	
Local Government Board (Ireland) Provisional Orders Confirmation (No. 1) Act 1904	4 Edw. 7. c. clxvii	15 August 1904
An Act to confirm certain Provisional Orders of the Local Government Board for Ireland relating to the Urban Districts of Blackrock Clonmel Dalkey Killiney and Ballybrack Kingstown Nenagh Pembroke Rathmines and Rathgar Templemore and Thurles and the Counties of Dublin Tipperary (North Riding) and Tipperary (South Riding).
	Dublin Urban County Districts (Financial Relations) Order 1904 Provisional Order to alter the financial relations between the Urban County Districts of Blackrock Dalkey Killiney and Ballybrack Kingstown Pembroke and Rathmines and Rathgar and the County of Dublin.	
	County of Tipperary (North Riding) Financial Relations Order 1904 Provisional Order to alter the financial relations between the Urban County Districts of Nenagh Templemore and Thurles and the County of Tipperary (North Riding).	
	Clonmel (Financial Relations) Order 1904 Provisional Order to alter the financial relations between the Borough of Clonmel and the County of Tipperary (South Riding).	
Local Government Board (Ireland) Provisional Orders Confirmation (No. 3) Act 1904	4 Edw. 7. c. clxviii	15 August 1904
An Act to confirm certain Provisional Orders of the Local Government Board for Ireland relating to Castlerea (Rural) Midleton (Rural) North Dublin (Rural) and Westport.
	Frenchpark Waterworks Order 1904 Provisional Order to enable the Council of the Rural District of Castlerea to put in force the Compulsory Clauses of the Lands Clauses Acts.	
	Carrigtwohill Waterworks Order 1904 Provisional Order to enable the Council of the Rural District of Midleton to put in force the Compulsory Clauses of the Lands Clauses Acts.	
	Howth Waterworks Order 1904 Provisional Order to enable the Council of the Rural District of North Dublin to put in force the Compulsory Clauses of the Lands Clauses Acts.	
	Westport Urban Order 1904 Provisional Order to enable the Council of the Urban District of Westport to put in force the Compulsory Clauses of the Lands Clauses Acts.	
Local Government Board (Ireland) Provisional Orders Confirmation (No. 5) Act 1904	4 Edw. 7. c. clxix	15 August 1904
An Act to confirm a Provisional Order of the Local Government Board for Ireland relating to the Harbour of Courtown in the County of Wexford.
	Courtown Harbour Order 1904 Provisional Order to transfer the business of the Commissioners of the Harbour of Courtown to the County Council of Wexford.	
Dundee Broughty Ferry and District Tramways Order Confirmation Act 1904 (repealed)	4 Edw. 7. c. clxx	15 August 1904
An Act to confirm a Provisional Order under the Private Legislation Procedure (Scotland) Act 1899 relating to Dundee Broughty Ferry and District Tramways. (Repealed by Dundee Corporation (Water, Transport, Finance, &c.) Order Confirmation Act 1954 (2 & 3 Eliz. 2. c.ix))
	Dundee Broughty Ferry and District Tramways Order 1904 Provisional Order incorporating the Dundec Broughty Ferry and District Tramways Company and empowering that Company to make and maintain tramways and other works and for other purposes.	
Glasgow Corporation (Police) Order Confirmation Act 1904 (repealed)	4 Edw. 7. c. clxxi	15 August 1904
An Act to confirm a Provisional Order under the Private Legislation Procedure (Scotland) Act 1899 relating to Glasgow Corporation (Police). (Repealed by Statute Law (Repeals) Act 1995 (c. 44))
	Glasgow Corporation (Police) Order 1904 Provisional Order to authorise the Corporation of the city of Glasgow to raise further moneys and to acquire additional lands in connection with Ruchill Hospital to enter into an agreement with the county council of the county of Renfrew as to the sewage of a portion of that county to confer upon the said Corporation further powers as to police and public health and for other purposes.	
Greenock Corporation Order Confirmation Act 1904	4 Edw. 7. c. clxxii	15 August 1904
An Act to confirm a Provisional Order under the Private Legislation Procedure (Scotland) Act 1899 relating to Greenock Corporation.
	Greenock Corporation Order 1904 Provisional Order authorising the Abandonment of an Authorised and the Construction of a New Street by the Provost Magistrates and Councillors of the Burgh of Greenock the Construction of a Branch Railway within the said Burgh by the Glasgow and South Western Railway Company and for other purposes.	
Newburgh and North Fife Railway (Extension of Time) Order Confirmation Act 1904	4 Edw. 7. c. clxxiii	15 August 1904
An Act to confirm a Provisional Order under the Private Legislation Procedure (Scotland) Act 1899 relating to the Newburgh and North Fife Railway.
	Newburgh and North Fife Railway (Extension of Time) Order 1904 Provisional Order to further extend the time limited by the Newburgh and North Fife Railway Act 1897 (Note: Newburgh and North Fife Railway Act 1897 (60 & 61 Vict. c. ccxxi)) and Acts and Order amending the same for the compulsory purchase of Lands and for the construction and completion of the Railways and Works by the first-mentioned Act authorised and for other purposes.	
Kirkcaldy Corporation Order Confirmation Act 1904 (repealed)	4 Edw. 7. c. clxxiv	15 August 1904
An Act to confirm a Provisional Order under the Private Legislation Procedure (Scotland) Act 1899 relating to Kirkcaldy Corporation. (Repealed by Kirkcaldy Corporation Order Confirmation Act 1939 (2 & 3 Geo. 6. c. vi))
	Kirkcaldy Corporation Order 1904 Provisional Order to authorise the provost magistrates and councillors of the royal burgh of Kirkcaldy to construct and work additional tramways in and adjacent to the burgh and to dissolve the harbour commissioners of Kirkcaldy and to vest the harbour in the provost magistrates and councillors and to authorise them to extend and improve the harbour and for other purposes.	
Electric Lighting Orders Confirmation (No. 2) Act 1904	4 Edw. 7. c. clxxv	15 August 1904
An Act to confirm certain Provisional Orders made by the Board of Trade under the Electric Lighting Acts 1882 and 1888 relating to Bath Rural District Brynmawr Chippenham Eastleigh and Bishopstoke Hanwell Southgate Urban District Tamworth Walton-le-Dale Watford and Widnes (Amendment).
	Bath Rural District Electric Lighting Order 1904 Provisional Order granted by the Board of Trade under the Electric Lighting Acts 1882 and 1888 to the Rural District Council of Bath in respect of the Rural District of Bath in the County of Somerset.	
	Brynmawr Electric Lighting Order 1904 Provisional Order granted by the Board of Trade under the Electric Lighting Acts 1882 and 1888 to the Urban District Council of Brynmawr in respect of the Urban District of Brynmaor in the County of Brecon.	
	Chippenham Corporation Electric Lighting Order 1904 Provisional Order granted by the Board of Trade under the Electric Lighting Acts 1882 and 1888 to the Mayor Aldermen and Burgesses of the Borough of Chippenham in respect of the Borough of Chippenham and the parishes adjoining thereto in the County of Wilts.	
	Eastleigh and Bishopstoke Electric Lighting Order 1904 Provisional Order granted by the Board of Trade under the Eastleigh and Electric Lighting Acts 1882 and 1888 to the Urban District Council of Eastleigh and Bishopstoke in respect of the Urban District of Eastleigh and Bishopstoke in the County of Southampton.	
	Hanwell Electric Lighting Order 1904 Provisional Order granted by the Board of Trade under the Electric Lighting Acts 1882 and 1888 to the Hanwell Urban District Council in respect of the Urban District of Hanwell in the County of Middlesex.	
	Southgate Urban District Electric Lighting Order 1904 Provisional Order granted by the Board of Trade under the Electric Lighting Acts 1882 and 1888 to the Southgate Urban District Council in respect of the Urban District of Southgate in the County of Middlesex.	
	Tamworth Corporation Electric Lighting Order 1904 Provisional Order granted by the Board of Trade under the Electric Lighting Acts 1882 and 1888 to the Mayor Aldermen and Burgesses of the Borough of Tamworth in respect of the Borough of Tamworth.	
	Walton-le-Dale Electric Lighting Order 1904 Provisional Order granted by the Board of Trade under the Electric Lighting Acts 1882 and 1888 to the Urban District Council of Walton-le-Dale in respect of the Urban District of Walton-le-Dale in the County Palatine of Lancaster.	
	Watford Electric Lighting Order 1904 Provisional Order granted by the Board of Trade under the Electric Lighting Acts 1882 and 1888 to the Urban District Council of Watford for extending their area of supply.	
	Widnes Electric Lighting Order 1904 Provisional Order granted by the Board of Trade under the Electric Lighting Acts 1882 and 1888 amending the Widnes Electric Lighting Order 1901.	
Electric Lighting Orders Confirmation (No. 3) Act 1904	4 Edw. 7. c. clxxvi	15 August 1904
An Act to confirm certain Provisional Orders made by the Board of Trade under the Electric Lighting Acts and 1888 relating to Birkenhead (Extension) Bishop Auckland (Amendment) Huddersfield (Extension to Golcar) Maidenhead (Extensions) Milford-on-Sea Newquay Penzance Ramsgate Sunderland Districts and Tavistock.
	Birkenhead Corporation (Extension) Electric Lighting Order 1904 Provisional Order granted by the Board of Trade under the Electric Lighting Acts 1882 and 1888 to the Mayor Aldermen and Burgesses of the County Borough of Birkenhead in respect of the extension of their existing area of supply to the Townships of Prenton and Upton within the Rural District of Wirral in the County of Chester.	
	Bishop Auckland Electric Lighting (Amendment) Order 1904 Provisional Order granted by the Board of Trade under the Electric Lighting Acts 1882 and 1888 to amend the Bishoр Auckland Electric Lighting Order 1900.	
	Huddersfield (Extension to Golcar) Electric Lighting Order 1904 Provisional Order granted by the Board of Trade under the Electric Lighting Acts 1882 and 1888 to the Mayor Aldermen and Burgesses of the County Borough of Huddersfield in respect of the Urban District of Golcar in the West Riding of the County of York.	
	Maidenhead Electric Lighting (Extensions) Order 1904 Provisional Order granted by the Board of Trade under the Electric Lighting Acts 1882 and 1888 to the Mayor Aldermen and Burgesses of the Borough of Maidenhead in respect of the Parish of Taplow in the Rural District of Eton in the County of Buckingham and the Parishes of Cookham and Bray in the Rural District of Cookham in the County of Berks.	
	Milford-on-Sea Electric Lighting Order 1904 Provisional Order granted by the Board of Trade under the Electric Lighting Acts 1882 and 1888 to the Milford-on-Sea Electric Supply Company Limited in respect of the Parishes of Milford and Hordle in the Rural District of Lymington in the County of Southampton.	
	Newquay Electric Lighting Order 1904 Provisional Order granted by the Board of Trade under the Electric Lighting Acts 1882 and 1888 to Henry Foote Leonard Milne and Edward John Owen (trading as the Southern District Electricity Corporation) in respect of the Urban District of Newquay in the County of Cornwall.	
	Penzance Electric Lighting Order 1904 Provisional Order granted by the Board of Trade under the Electric Lighting Acts 1882 and 1888 to the Penzance and District Electric Supply Company Limited in respect of the Borough of Penzance in the County of Cornwall.	
	Ramsgate Electric Lighting Order 1904 Provisional Order granted by the Board of Trade under the Electric Lighting Acts 1882 and 1888 to the Ramsgate and District Electric Supply Company Limited in respect of the Borough of Ramsgate in the County of Kent.	
	Sunderland Districts Electric Lighting Order 1904 Provisional Order granted by the Board of Trade under the Electric Lighting Acts 1882 and 1888 to the County of Durham Electrical Power Distribution Company Limited in respect of the Urban District of Southwick-on-Wear the Rural District of Sunderland and the Rural District of Houghton-le-Spring in the County of Durham.	
	Tavistock Electric Lighting Order 1904 Provisional Order granted by the Board of Trade under the Electric Lighting Acts 1882 and 1888 to the County of Durham Electrical Power Distribution Company Limited in respect of the Urban District of Southwick-on-Wear the Rural District of Sunderland and the Rural District of Houghton-le-Spring in the County of Durham.	
Electric Lighting Orders Confirmation (No. 4) Act 1904	4 Edw. 7. c. clxxvii	15 August 1904
n Act to confirm certain Provisional Orders made by the Board of Trade under the Electric Lighting Acts 1882 and 1888 relating to Ashford (Kent) Ely Ham Hexham Horley Keynsham (Somerset) Kingswood Newton Abbot (Extension) Teignmouth (Amendment) and Walton-upon-Thames.
	Ashford (Kent) Electric Lighting Order 1904 Provisional Order granted by the Board of Trade under the Electric Lighting Acts 1882 and 1888 to the Ashford and District Electric Supply Company Limited in respect of the Urban District of Ashford in the County of Kent.	
	Ely Electric Lighting Order 1904 Provisional Order granted by the Board of Trade under the Electric Lighting Acts 1882 and 1888 to Henry Foote Leonard Milne and Edward John Owen (trading as the Southern District Electricity Corporation) in respect of part of the Urban District of Ely in the County of Cambridge.	
	Ham Electric Lighting Order 1904 Provisional Order granted by the Board of Trade under the Electric Lighting Acts 1882 and 1888 to the Twickenham and Teddington Electric Supply Company Limited in respect of the Urban District of Ham.	
	Hexham Electric Lighting Order 1904 Provisional Order granted by the Board of Trade under the Electric Lighting Acts 1882 and 1888 to Edwin Percy Harvey of Riverdale House Richmond in the County of Surrey in respect of the Urban District of Hexham and the Parishes of Acomb Sandhoe Hexham West Quarter and Warden in the Rural District of Hexham in the County of Northumberland.	
	Horley Electric Lighting Order 1904 Provisional Order granted by the Board of Trade under the Electric Lighting Acts 1882 and 1888 to Marshall Handyside Bennett in respect of the Parish of Horley in the Rural District of Reigate in the County of Surrey.	
	Keynsham (Somerset) Electric Lighting Order 1904 Provisional Order granted by the Board of Trade under the Electric Lighting Acts 1882 and 1888 to the Keynsham Electric Light and Power Company Limited in respect of the Parishes of Keynsham and Saltford in the Rural District of Keynsham in the County of Somerset.	
	Kingswood Electric Lighting Order 1904 Provisional Order granted by the Board of Trade under the Electric Lighting Acts 1882 and 1888 to the Kingswood Electric Supply Company Limited in respect of the Urban District of Kingswood in the County of Gloucester.	
	Newton Abbot (Extension) Electric Lighting Order 1904 Provisional Order granted by the Board of Trade under the Electric Lighting Acts 1882 and 1888 to the Urban Electric Supply Company Limited in respect of part of the Urban District of Newton Abbot.	
	Teignmouth Electric Lighting Order 1904 Provisional Order granted by the Board of Trade under the Electric Lighting Acts 1882 and 1888 to the Urban District Council of Teignmouth amending the Teignmouth Electric Lighting Order 1899.	
	Walton-upon-Thames Electric Lighting Order 1904 Provisional Order granted by the Board of Trade under the Electric Lighting Acts 1882 and 1888 to the Urban Electric Supply Company Limited in respect of the Urban District of Walton-upon-Thames.	
Electric Lighting Orders Confirmation (No. 6) Act 1904	4 Edw. 7. c. clxxviii	15 August 1904
An Act to confirm certain Provisional Orders made by the Board of Trade under the Electric Lighting Acts 1882 and 1888 relating to Clevedon Portishead and Long Ashton Crediton Devizes Hampton Wick and District Houghton-le-Spring and District the Maidens and Coombe Northampton and District Stroud Nails worth and Dursley and Trowbridge (Urban) Bradford-on-Avon (Urban) and Bradford-on-Avon (Rural).
	Cleveland, Portishead and Long Ashton Electric Lighting Order 1904 Provisional Order granted by the Board of Trade under the Electric Lighting Acts 1882 and 1888 to the Western Electric Distributing Corporation Limited in respect of the Urban Districts of Clevedon and Portishead and the Rural District of Long Ashton all in the County of Somerset.	
	Crediton Electric Lighting Order 1904 Provisional Order granted by the Board of Trade under the Electric Lighting Acts 1882 and 1888 to Messrs. Christy Brothers and Middleton of Chelmsford Essex in respect of the Urban District of Crediton in the County of Devon.	
	Devizes Electric Lighting Order 1904 Provisional Order granted by the Board of Trade under the Electric Lighting Acts 1882 and 1888 to the Mayor Aldermen and Burgesses of the Borough of Devizes in respect of the Borough of Devizes in the County of Wilts.	
	Hampton Wick and District Electric Lighting Order 1904 Provisional Order granted by the Board of Trade under the Electric Lighting Acts 1882 and 1888 to the Twickenham and Teddington Electric Supply Company Limited in respect of the Urban Districts of Hampton Wick Esher and the Dittons East and West Molesey Sunbury and Feltham and the Parishes of Hanworth Ashford and Shepperton in the Rural District of Staines.	
	Houghton-le-Spring and District Electric Lighting Order 1904 Provisional Order granted by the Board of Trade under the Electric Lighting Acts 1882 and 1888 to Harry James Almond in respect of the Urban Districts of Houghton-le-Spring and Hetton-le-Hole and the Rural District of Easington in the County of Durham.	
	The Maldens and Coombe Electric Lighting Order 1904 Provisional Order granted by the Board of Trade under the Electric Lighting Acts 1882 and 1888 to the Urban District Council of The Maldens and Coombe in respect of the Urban District of The Maldens and Coombe in the County of Surrey.	
	Northampton and District Electric Lighting Order 1904 Provisional Order granted by the Board of Trade under the Electric Lighting Acts 1882 and 1888 to the Northampton Electric Light and Power Company Limited in respect of the extension of their area of supply to parts of the County Borough of Northampton and to the parishes of Moulton Moulton Park Boughton Church Brampton and Chapel Brampton in the Rural District of Brixworth to the Parishes of Hardingstone Wootton Great Houghton Little Houghton Milton Collingtree and Rothersthorpe in the Rural District of Hardingstone and to the Parishes of Weston Favell Great Billing Little Billing Dallington Duston Upton and Kislingbury in the Rural District of Northampton and for the Amendment of the Northampton Electric Lighting Order 1890.	
	Stroud, Nailsworth and Dursley Electric Lighting Order 1904 Provisional Order granted by the Board of Trade under the Electric Lighting Acts 1882 and 1888 to the Gloucestershire Electric Power Company in respect of the Rural District of Stroud the Urban District of Nailsworth and the Parish of Dursley in the Rural District of Dursley all in the County of Gloucester.	
	Trowbridge Urban and Bradford-on-Avon Rural Electric Lighting Order 1904 Provisional Order granted by the Board of Trade under the Electric Lighting Acts 1882 and 1888 to the Western Electric Distributing Corporation Limited in respect of the Urban District of Trowbridge the Urban District of Bradford-on-Avon and the Rural District of Bradford-on-Avon all in the County of Wilts.	
Electric Lighting Orders Confirmation (No. 8) Act 1904	4 Edw. 7. c. clxxix	15 August 1904
An Act to confirm certain Provisional Orders granted by the Board of Trade under the Electric Lighting Acts 1882 and 1888 relating to Caerphilly Epsom Rural District (Cheam) Mansfield Woodhouse North Worcestershire (Bromsgrove Urban) and Sutton-in-Ashfield.
	Caerphilly Electric Lighting Order 1904 Provisional Order granted by the Board of Trade under the Electric Lighting Acts 1882 and 1888 to the Urban District Council of Caerphilly in respect of the Urban District of Caerphilly in the County of Glamorgan.	
	Epsom Rural District (Cheam) Electric Lighting Order 1904 ovisional Order granted by the Board of Trade under the Electric Lighting Acts 1882 and 1888 to the County of Surrey Electrical Power Distribution Company Limited in respect of the parish of Cheam in the Rural District of Epsom in the County of Surrey.	
	Mansfield Woodhouse Electric Lighting Order 1904 Provisional Order granted by the Board of Trade under the Electric Lighting Acts 1882 and 1888 to the Mansfield Woodhouse Urban District Council in respect of the Urban District of Mansfield Woodhouse in the County of Nottingham.	
	North Worcestershire (Bromsgrove Urban) Electric Lighting Order 1904 Provisional Order granted by the Board of Trade under the Electric Lighting Acts 1882 and 1888 to the Shropshire and Worcestershire Electric Power Company in respect of the Urban District of Bromsgrove in the County of Worcester.	
	Sutton-in-Ashfield Urban District Electric Lighting Order 1904 Provisional Order granted by the Board of Trade under the Electric Lighting Acts 1882 and 1888 to the Urban District Council of Sutton-in-Ashfield in respect of the Urban District of Sutton-in-Ashfield in the County of Nottingham.	
Tramways Orders Confirmation (No. 1) Act 1904	4 Edw. 7. c. clxxx	15 August 1904
An Act to confirm certain Provisional Orders made by the Board of Trade under the Tramways Act 1870 (Note: Tramways Act 1870 (33 & 34 Vict. c. 78)) relating to Altrincham Urban District Council Tramways Calverley Urban District Council Tramways Crompton Urban District Council Tramways Plymouth Corporation Tramways Rochdale Corporation Tramway Royton Urban District Council Tramways and Wardle Urban District Council Tramway.
	Altrincham Urban District Council Tramways Order 1904 Order authorising the Urban District Council of Altrincham in the County of Chester to construct Tramways in their District.	
	Calverley Urban District Council Tramways Order 1904 Order authorising the Urban District Council of Calverley to construct Tramways in their District and for other purposes.	
	Crompton Urban District Council Tramways Order 1904 Order authorising the Urban District Council of Crompton to construct the Tramways in their District authorised by the Crompton Urban District Council Tramways Order 1901.	
	Plymouth Corporation Tramways Order 1904 Order authorising the Mayor Aldermen and Burgesses of the Borough of Plymouth to construct additional Tramways in their Borough.	
	Rochdale Corporation Tramway Order 1904 Order authorising the Mayor Aldermen and Burgesses of the Borough of Rochdale to construct an additional Tramway in their Borough.	
	Royton Urban District Council Tramways Order 1904 Order authorising the Urban District Council of Royton to construct the Tramways in their District authorised by the Royton Urban District Council Tramways Order 1901.	
	Wardle Urban District Council Tramway Order 1904 Order authorising the Urban District Council of Wardle to construct a Tramway in their District and for other purposes.	
Tramways Orders Confirmation (No. 2) Act 1904	4 Edw. 7. c. clxxxi	15 August 1904
An Act to confirm certain Provisional Orders made by the Board of Trade under the Tramways Act 1870 relating to Bishop Auckland Shildon and Spennymoor Tramways Dewsbury. Corporation Tramways East Ham Urban District Council Tramways Ossett Corporation Tramways Sunderland Corporation Tramway and West Ham Corporation Tramways.
	Bishop Auckland, Shildon and Spennymoor Tramways Order 1904 Order authorising the United Kingdom Tramway Light Railway and Electrical Syndicate Limited to construct tramways in the Urban Districts of Bishop Auckland Shildon and East Thickley and Spennymoor and the Rural Districts of Auckland and Durham all in the County of Durham and for other purposes.	
	Dewsbury Corporation Tramways Order 1904 Order authorising the Mayor Aldermen and Burgesses of the Borough of Dewsbury to construct tramways in their borough.	
	East Ham Urban District Council Tramways Order 1904 Order authorising the Urban District Council of East Ham to construct certain Tramways in their District authorised by the East Ham Urban District Council Tramways Order 1900 and for other purposes.	
	Ossett Corporation Tramways Order 1904 Order authorising the Mayor Aldermen and Burgesses of the Borough of Ossett to construct Tramways in their Borough.	
	Sunderland Corporation Tramways Order 1904 Order authorising the Mayor Aldermen and Burgesses of the County Borough of Sunderland to construct an Additional Tramway in their Borough.	
	West Ham Corporation Tramways Order 1904 Order authorising the Mayor Aldermen and Burgesses of the County Borough of West Ham to construct a Tramway in their Borough.	
Gas and Water Orders Confirmation Act 1904	4 Edw. 7. c. clxxxii	15 August 1904
An Act to confirm certain Provisional Orders made by the Board of Trade under the Gas and Water Works Facilities Act 1870 relating to Rainham Water Sevenoaks Water Southwold Water Wetherby District Water and Meldreth and Melboum District Gas and Water.
	Rainham Water Order 1904 Order empowering the Rainham Waterworks Company Limited to maintain and continue Waterworks to supply Water and for other purposes.	
	Sevenoaks Water Order 1904 Order empowering the Sevenoaks Waterworks Company to acquire and hold additional land.	
	Southwold Water Order 1904 Order empowering the Southwold Waterworks Company Limited to construct additional works to extend their limits of supply to raise additional capital and for other purposes.	
	Wetherby District Water Order 1904 Order empowering the Wetherby District Water Company to reducе the authorised share and loan capital and to empower them to raise further money by means of preference shares and for other purposes.	
	Meldreth and Melbourn District Gas and Water Order 1904 Order empowering the Meldreth and Melbourn District Gas and Water Company Limited to construct and maintain Gasworks and Waterworks and to make and supply Gas and to supply Water within the parishes of Meldreth Melbourn and Shepreth in the county of Cambridge.	
Glasgow Corporation (Tramways, &c.) Order Confirmation Act 1904 (repealed)	4 Edw. 7. c. clxxxiii	15 August 1904
An Act to confirm a Provisional Order under the Private Legislation Procedure (Scotland) Act 1899 relating to Glasgow Corporation (Tramways &c.). (Repealed by Glasgow Corporation Consolidation (Water, Transport and Markets) Order Confirmation Act 1964 (c. xliii))
	Glasgow Corporation (Tramways, &c.) Order 1904 Provisional Order to authorise the Corporation of the cily of Glasgow to construct new tramways to acquire additional lands in connection with the markets and slaughter-houses and to charge increased market rates or tolls to borrow money for those purposes and for other purposes.	
Pier and Harbour Orders Confirmation (No. 2) Act 1904	4 Edw. 7. c. clxxxiv	15 August 1904
An Act to confirm certain Provisional Orders made by the Board of Trade under the General Pier and Harbour Act 1861 relating to Hartlepool and Waterford.
	Hartlepool Port and Harbour Order 1904 Provisional Order to amend the Hartlepool Port and Harbour Acts 1855 (Note: Hartlepool Port and Harbour Act 1855 (18 & 19 Vict. c. cxxvi)) and 1869. (Note: Hartlepool Port and Harbour Act 1869 (32 & 33 Vict. c. lxxxii))	
	Waterford Harbour Order 1904 Provisional Order for altering for the purposes of rating the method of calculating the register tonnage of steam vessels entering or using the Port and Harbour of Waterford for extending the limits of the said Port and Harbour and for altering and repealing certain existing and authorising new rates dues and charges and for other purposes.	
Pier and Harbour Order Confirmation (No. 3) Act 1904	4 Edw. 7. c. clxxxv	15 August 1904
An Act to confirm a Provisional Order made by the Board of Trade under the General Pier and Harbour Act 1861 relating to Islay.
	Islay Piers Order 1904 Provisional Order for the maintenance and regulation of and authorising the levying of rates at certain Piers in the Island of Islay in the County of Argyll.	
Water Orders Confirmation Act 1904	4 Edw. 7. c. clxxxvi	15 August 1904
An Act to confirm certain Provisional Orders made by the Board of Trade under the Gas and Water Works Facilities Act 1870 relating to Bradfield Water Cholderton and District Water Elham Valley Water Frimley and Farnborough District Water and North Sunderland Waterworks.
	Bradfield Water Order 1904 Order authorising the maintenance of Waterworks and the supply of Water in the parish of Bradfield in the county of Berks.	
	Cholderton and District Water Order 1904 Order authorising the construction and maintenance of Waterworks and the supply of water in the parish of Cholderton in the county of Wilts and parts of the parishes of Bulford in the same county and of Shipton Bellinger Thruxton Amport and Quarley all in the county of Southampton.	
	Elham Valley Water Order 1904 Order authorising the construction of Waterworks and the supply of Water to and within the parishes and places of Lyminge Elham Postling Stanford and Saltwood all in the county of Kent.	
	Frimley and Farnborough District Water Order 1904 Order empowering the Frimley and Farnborough District Water Company to extend their limits of supply and raise additional capital and for other purposes.	
	North Sunderland Waterworks Order 1904 Order authorising the construction and maintenance of Waterworks and the supply of Water in the parishes of Fleetham Elford and North Sunderland and parts of the parishes of Ellingham Chathill and Swinhoe in the county of Northumberland.	
Aberdeen City Improvements Order Confirmation Act 1904 (repealed)	4 Edw. 7. c. clxxxvii	15 August 1904
An Act to confirm a Provisional Order under the Private Legislation Procedure (Scotland) Act 1899 relating to Aberdeen City Improvements. (Repealed by Aberdeen Corporation (Administration Finance, &c.) Order Confirmation Act 1940 (3 & 4 Geo. 6. c. iii))
	Aberdeen City Improvements Order 1904 Provisional Order to authorise the Lord Provost magistrates and toicn council of the city and royal burgh of Aberdeen to make certain street improvements and new streets to borrow further money and for other purposes.	
Edinburgh and District Water Order Confirmation Act 1904 (repealed)	4 Edw. 7. c. clxxxviii	15 August 1904
An Act to confirm a Provisional Order made under the Private Legislation Procedure (Scotland) Act 1899 relating to Edinburgh and District Water. (Repealed by Edinburgh Corporation Order Confirmation Act 1964 (c. xli))
	Edinburgh and District Water Order 1904 Provisional Order to authorise the Edinburgh and District Water Trustees to construct additional works and to sanction certain works already constructed to postpone the obligation of constant supply and pressure to authorise the purchase of additional lands to establish an employees' allowance fund to increase the public water rate to borrow further money and for other purposes.	
Glasgow and South Western Railway (Darvel and Lanarkshire Transfer) Order Confirmation Act 1904	4 Edw. 7. c. clxxxix	15 August 1904
An Act to confirm a Provisional Order under the Private Legislation Procedure (Scotland) Act 1899 relating to the Glasgow and South Western Railway (Darvel and Lanarkshire Railway Transfer).
	Glasgow and South Western Railway (Darvel and Lanarkshire Transfer) Order 1904 Provisional Order for transferring to the Glasgow and South Western Railway Company Railway No. 3 authorised by the Caledonian Railway Act 1896 (Note: Caledonian Railway Act 1896 (59 & 60 Vict. c. clx)) to extend the time for the acquisition of lands for and the construction of the Glasgow and Renfrew District Railway and for other purposes.	
Perth Corporation Order Confirmation Act 1904	4 Edw. 7. c. cxc	15 August 1904
An Act to confirm a Provisional Order under the Private Legislation Procedure (Scotland) Act 1899 relating to Perth Corporation.
	Perth Corporation Order 1904 Provisional Order to authorise the Lord Provost magistrates and councillors of the city and royal burgh of Perth to construct tramways to borrow additional moneys for their tramway water and gas undertakings and city improvements and for other purposes.	
Ayr Corporation Tramways Order Confirmation Act 1904	4 Edw. 7. c. cxci	15 August 1904
An Act to confirm a Provisional Order under the Private Legislation Procedure (Scotland) Act 1899 relating to Ayr Corporation Tramways.
	Ayr Corporation Tramways Order 1904 Provisional Order conferring further powers upon the Provost Magistrates and Councillors of the Burgh of Ayr in respect of their Tramway Undertaking.	
Glasgow Corporation (Sewage) Order Confirmation Act 1904	4 Edw. 7. c. cxcii	15 August 1904
An Act to confirm a Provisional Order under the Private Legislation Procedure (Scotland) Act 1899 relating to Glasgow Corporation (Sewage).
	Glasgow Corporation (Sewage) Order 1904 Provisional Order to authorise the Corporation of the City of Glasgow to construct deviations of authorised sewers to abandon certain authorised sewers and the authorised deviation of the Renfrew Road to acquire land for sewage purposes to confirm agreements and for other purposes.	
Alexandra (Newport and South Wales) Docks and Railway Act 1904	4 Edw. 7. c. cxciii	15 August 1904
An Act to empower the Alexandra (Newport and South Wales) Docks and Railway Company to extend their existing South Dock and to construct other Works and to execute a diversion or straightening of the River Ebbw and for other purposes.
Portmadoc, Beddgelert and South Snowdon Railway Act 1904	4 Edw. 7. c. cxciv	15 August 1904
An Act to empower the Portmadoc Beddgelert and South Snowdon Railway Company to construct new Railways and to authorise Agreements between that Company and the North Wales Narrow Gauge Railways Company and for other purposes.
Cardiff Railway Act 1904	4 Edw. 7. c. cxcv	15 August 1904
An Act for empowering the Cardiff Railway Company to construct a new Railway and to abandon the construction of a portion of Railway already authorised and for amending the Acts relating to the Cardiff Railway Company and for other purposes.
Derwent Valley Water Act 1904	4 Edw. 7. c. cxcvi	15 August 1904
An Act to confer further powers on the Derwent Valley Water Board to confer powers upon the Corporation of Leicester with respect to the Works authorised to be constructed by that Corporation under the powers of the Derwent Valley Water Act 1899 (Note: Derwent Valley Water Act 1899 (62 & 63 Vict. c. cclxix)) to confer borrowing powers upon the Corporations of Derby Leicester Sheffield and Nottingham and for other purposes.
Great Western Railway Act 1904	4 Edw. 7. c. cxcvii	15 August 1904
An Act for conferring further powers upon the Great Western Railway Company in respect of their own undertaking and upon that Company and the London and North Western Railway Company in respect of undertakings in which they are jointly interested and upon the Great Western and Great Central Railways Joint Committee in respect of their undertaking for authorizing the abandonment of the Somersetshire Coal Canal and the vesting of the site thereof in the Great Western Railway Company for amalgamating the Abingdon Railway Company with the Great Western Railway Company and for other purposes.
London United Tramways Act 1904	4 Edw. 7. c. cxcviii	15 August 1904
An Act for conferring further powers on the London United Tramways (1901) Limited for constructing Tramways and widening and altering roads and acquiring lands in the Counties of Middlesex Surrey and London and for other purposes.
Tottenham Improvement Act 1904 (repealed)	4 Edw. 7. c. cxcix	15 August 1904
An Act to confer further powers upon the Urban District Council for the District of Tottenham in the County of Middlesex and to confer powers upon the Metropolitan Electric Tramways Limited. (Repealed by Local Law (North West London Boroughs) Order 1965 (SI 1965/533))
Barnet District Gas and Water Act 1904 (repealed)	4 Edw. 7. c. cc	15 August 1904
An Act to enable the Barnet District Gas and Water Company to acquire additional lands construct additional works and raise further capital and for other purposes. (Repealed by Lee Valley Water Act 1959 (7 & 8 Eliz. 2. c. li))
Strabane, Raphoe and Convoy Railway (Extension to Letterkenny) Act 1904	4 Edw. 7. c. cci	15 August 1904
An Act to empower the Strabane Raphoe and Convoy Railway Company to construct Railways in the Counties of Tyrone and Donegal to change the name of the Company and for other purposes.
Surrey Commercial Dock Act 1904 (repealed)	4 Edw. 7. c. ccii	15 August 1904
An Act to authorise the Surrey Commercial Dock Company to raise further Capital and for other purposes. (Repealed by Port of London (Consolidation) Act 1920 (10 & 11 Geo. 5. c. clxxiii))
Thames River Steamboat Service Act 1904	4 Edw. 7. c. cciii	15 August 1904
An Act to provide for the Acquisition and Construction of Piers and Landing-places on the River Thames in the Administrative County of London by the London County Council and to make provision for a service of Vessels for passengers and parcels and for other purposes.
Torquay Tramways Act 1904	4 Edw. 7. c. cciv	15 August 1904
An Act to authorise the construction of Tramways in Torquay and for other purposes.
Tyneside Tramways and Tramroads Act 1904 (repealed)	4 Edw. 7. c. ccv	15 August 1904
An Act to confer further powers upon the Tyneside Tramways and Tramroads Company with respect to the construction and maintenance of works and the acquisition of lands and for other purposes. (Repealed by Tyne and Wear Act 1980 (c.xliii))
Holywood Tramways Act 1904	4 Edw. 7. c. ccvi	15 August 1904
An Act to authorise the making of Tramways and Tramroads in the City of Belfast and in the County of Down and for other purposes.
Lothians Electric Power Act 1904 (repealed)	4 Edw. 7. c. ccvii	15 August 1904
An Act for incorporating and conferring Powers on the Lothians Electric Power Company. (Repealed by South of Scotland Electricity Order Confirmation Act 1956 (4 & 5 Eliz. 2. c. xciv))
Great Yarmouth Corporation Act 1904	4 Edw. 7. c. ccviii	15 August 1904
An Act to empower the Corporation of Great Yarmouth to construct tramways street improvements and other works and to acquire the ferries across the Haven to make farther provision in regard to the health local government and improvement of their borough and for other purposes.
King's College Hospital Act 1904	4 Edw. 7. c. ccix	15 August 1904
An Act to authorise the sale and disposal of the Site of King's College Hospital London and the acquisition of Lands for and Erection of a New Hospital and for other purposes.
Leeds Corporation (Waterworks) Railway Act 1904 (repealed)	4 Edw. 7. c. ccx	15 August 1904
An Act for empowering the Corporation of Leeds to construct certain temporary railways and works to facilitate the construction of their authorised waterworks in the Valley of the Burn and to authorise the placing of electric lines in certain highways and for other purposes. (Repealed by West Yorkshire Act 1980 (c. xiv))
Manchester Corporation Tramways Act 1904	4 Edw. 7. c. ccxi	15 August 1904
An Act to authorise the Corporation of Manchester to construct tramways and street widenings within and beyond the city to confer further powers upon the Corporation and neighbouring authorities with respect to the exercise of powers relating to tramways works and electricity within and beyond the city and for other purposes.
Manchester Ship Canal Act 1904	4 Edw. 7. c. ccxii	15 August 1904
An Act to authorise the Manchester Ship Canal Company to vary the levels of and depth of Water in their Canal and to construct new Works and to alter certain provisions of The Manchester Ship Canal Act 1885 (Note: Manchester Ship Canal Act 1885 (48 & 49 Vict. c. clxxxviii)) and The Manchester Ship Canal Act 1896 (Note: Manchester Ship Canal Act 1896 (59 & 60 Vict. c. clxxxii)) and for other purposes.
North Wales Electric Power Act 1904	4 Edw. 7. c. ccxiii	15 August 1904
An Act for empowering the North Wales Power and Traction Company Limited to construct Generating Stations and supply Electricity in certain parts of North Wales and for other purposes.
West Riding Tramways Act 1904	4 Edw. 7. c. ccxiv	15 August 1904
An Act to authorise the Wakefield and District Light Railway Company to construct Tramways and a Tramroad and other Works in the West Riding of the County of York and for other purposes.
Felixstowe Gas Act 1904 (repealed)	4 Edw. 7. c. ccxv	15 August 1904
An Act to incorporate and confer powers upon the Felixstowe Gas Light Company. (Repealed by Ipswich Gas Order 1929 (SR&O 1929/1097))
Radcliffe Tramways and Improvement Act 1904	4 Edw. 7. c. ccxvi	15 August 1904
An Act to confer on the Urban District Council of Radcliffe further powers with regard to their Tramways Undertaking to construct new tramways and street improvements to extend the Town's Yard and to make further provision in regard to the supply of Electricity and for the Improvement Health Local Government and Finance of the District and for other purposes.
South Shields Gas Act 1904 (repealed)	4 Edw. 7. c. ccxvii	15 August 1904
An Act to confer further powers upon the South Shields Gas Company. (Repealed by Newcastle-upon-Tyne and Gateshead Gas Order 1937 (SR&O 1937/1186))
London and India Docks Company Act 1904 (repealed)	4 Edw. 7. c. ccxviii	15 August 1904
An Act to extend the time for the compulsory purchase of lauds required for and for the completion of certain works and for other purposes. (Repealed by Port of London (Consolidation) Act 1920 (10 & 11 Geo. 5. c. clxxiii))
Ilford Urban District Council Act 1904	4 Edw. 7. c. ccxix	15 August 1904
An Act to authorise the Urban District Council of Ilford in the county of Essex to carry out street improvements to make further provision for the Improvement Health Local Government and Finance of the District and for other purposes.
Newcastle-upon-Tyne Corporation Act 1904	4 Edw. 7. c. ccxx	15 August 1904
An Act to enable the Mayor Aldermen and Citizens of the City and County of Newcastle-upon-Tyne to construct and work Additional Tramways in and adjacent to the City to widen existing Streets to construct new Streets across and Works in the Ouseburn Valley to make a new Quay to acquire lands to establish a Superannuation Fund to raise further Money and to confer various further powers upon the Corporation in respect of their existing Quays and for other purposes.
Saddleworth and Springhead Tramways Act 1904	4 Edw. 7. c. ccxxi	15 August 1904
An Act for the Abandonment of a portion of the undertaking authorised by the Saddleworth and Springhead Tramways Act 1902 (Note: Saddleworth and Springhead Tramways Act 1902 (2 Edw. 7. c. ccxxvi)) and for other purposes.
Bridlington Corporation Act 1904 (repealed)	4 Edw. 7. c. ccxxii	15 August 1904
An Act to make further and better provision for the Health Good Government and Improvement of the Borough of Bridlington and for other purposes. (Repealed by Humberside Act 1982 (c. iii))
Bristol Corporation Act 1904	4 Edw. 7. c. ccxxiii	15 August 1904
An Act to extend the City and County of Bristol and for other purposes.
Buxton Urban District Council Act 1904 (repealed)	4 Edw. 7. c. ccxxiv	15 August 1904
An Act for authorising the Urban District Council of Buxton to acquire from the Most Noble Spencer Compton Duke of Devonshire K.G. the Mineral Water Baths of Buxton and to maintain and improve the same and for other purposes. (Repealed by Derbyshire Act 1981 (c. xxxiv))
Trafford Park Act 1904	4 Edw. 7. c. ccxxv	15 August 1904
An Act for transferring the powers of the West Manchester Light Railways Company and for providing for the Regulation of certain Roads in Trafford Park and tor other purposes.
Stretford Urban District Council Act 1904	4 Edw. 7. c. ccxxvi	15 August 1904
An Act to empower the Urban District Council of Stretford to construct Additional Tramways and other works within their District and to make further and better provision for the Good Government of the said Urban District and for other purposes.
Barry Railway (Steam Vessels) Act 1904	4 Edw. 7. c. ccxxvii	15 August 1904
An Act to authorise the Barry Railway Company to provide and work Steam Vessels to raise Additional Capital and for other purposes.
Belfast and North East Ireland Electricity and Power-Gas Act 1904	4 Edw. 7. c. ccxxviii	15 August 1904
An Act for incorporating and conferring Powers on the Belfast and North East Ireland Electricity and Power Gas Company and for other purposes.
Belfast Corporation (Tramways) Act 1904	4 Edw. 7. c. ccxxix	15 August 1904
An Act to empower the Lord Mayor Aldermen and Citizens of the City of Belfast to construct and work Tramways and to purchase by Agreement the Undertaking of the Belfast Street Tramways Company including the Tramways constructed by the Sydenham District Belfast Tramways Company and the Belfast and Ligoniel Tramways Company and the Tramways of the Belfast and County Down Railway Company and for other purposes.
Neath, Pontardawe and Brynaman Railway Act 1904	4 Edw. 7. c. ccxxx	15 August 1904
An Act to confer further powers upon the Neath Pontardawe and Brynaman Railway Company for the construction of Railways and the raising of Capital and for other purposes.
London County Council (Tramways and Improvements) Act 1904	4 Edw. 7. c. ccxxxi	15 August 1904
An Act to enable the London County Council to construct and work New Tramways and to alter and reconstruct existing Tramways in the County of London to make Street Improvements in the Counties of London and Kent to empower the Council of the Metropolitan Borough of Woolwich to construct a New Street and for other purposes.
Rotherham Corporation Act 1904	4 Edw. 7. c. ccxxxii	15 August 1904
An Act to provide for altering the Wards of the County Borough of Rotherham and for increasing the number of Aldermen and Councillors to confer further Powers on the Corporation of the Borough in regard to their Gas Water Tramways and Electrical Undertakings to make further provisions for the health improvement and local government of the Borough and for other purposes.
Selby Urban District Council Act 1904	4 Edw. 7. c. ccxxxiii	15 August 1904
An Act to enable the Urban District Council of Selby to construct New Waterworks and to make further provision with regard to their Water and Gas Undertakings and for the improvement health and local government of the District.
Swindon Corporation Act 1904	4 Edw. 7. c. ccxxxiv	15 August 1904
An Act to enable the Corporation of the Borough of Swindon to make new Tramways and to make further provisions with reference to Markets and for the health local government and improvement of the Borough and for other purposes.
Manchester Corporation (General Powers) Act 1904	4 Edw. 7. c. ccxxxv	15 August 1904
An Act to confer powers upon the Lord Mayor Aldermen and Citizens of the City of Manchester with reference to the construction of Waterworks and Streets and otherwise for the better local government and improvement of the City to extend the City and to make provision with reference to the borrowing powers of the Corporation and for other purposes.
Newcastle and Gateshead Waterworks Act 1904	4 Edw. 7. c. ccxxxvi	15 August 1904
An Act to extend the limits of supply of the Newcastle and Gateshead Water Company and to enable Local Authorities within the additional limits to require the Company to supply them with Water in bulk and to empower the Company to raise further Capital and for other purposes.
Bristol Tramways (Extensions) Act 1904	4 Edw. 7. c. ccxxxvii	15 August 1904
An Act for conferring further powers on the Bristol Tramways and Carriage Company Limited for constructing Tramways and widening and altering roads and acquiring lands in and near Bristol and for other purposes.
Oakengates and Dawley Joint Water Board Act 1904	4 Edw. 7. c. ccxxxviii	15 August 1904
An Act to constitute and incorporate a Joint Water Board consisting of Representatives of the Oakengates and Dawley Urban District Councils in the county of Salop and for other purposes.
Lancashire and Yorkshire Railway (Steam Vessels) Act 1904	4 Edw. 7. c. ccxxxix	15 August 1904
An Act to authorise the Lancashire and Yorkshire Railway Company to provide and work Steam Vessels between the Ports of Goole and Hull and certain Continental Ports and to subscribe to the Funds of Steamship Companies and for other purposes.
Leyton Urban District Council Act 1904	4 Edw. 7. c. ccxl	15 August 1904
An Act to authorise the Urban District Council of Leyton in the County of Essex to construct and work Tramways and to confer further powers on the Council in regard to their Tramways Undertaking and their Electrical Undertaking to empower the Council to execute certain street widenings to provide for vesting in the Council certain Lammas Lands as open spaces and recreation grounds to make further provision for the improvement health and local government of the District and for other purposes.
Loch Leven Water Power (Amendment) Act 1904	4 Edw. 7. c. ccxli	15 August 1904
An Act to confer farther powers on the Loch Leven Water and Electric Power Company and to extend the time for the purchase of lands and for the completion of part of the authorised works of that Company and for other purposes.
Clyde Navigation Act 1904	4 Edw. 7. c. ccxlii	15 August 1904
An Act to authorise the Trustees of the Clyde Navigation to construct Quays Wharves and Basins at Yorkhill and Merklands and River Walls Tramways and other works to make further provision with respect to the storage of goods tolls and rates and the borrowing of additional Money and for other purposes.
Middlesbrough, Stockon-on-Tees and Thornaby Tramways Act 1904	4 Edw. 7. c. ccxliii	15 August 1904
An Act for conferring further powers on the Imperial Tramways Company Limited for constructing Tramways and widening and altering Roads and acquiring Lands in the North Riding of the County of York and for other purposes.
London County Council (General Powers) Act 1904	4 Edw. 7. c. ccxliv	15 August 1904
An Act to empower the London County Council to acquire Lands for Fire Brigade purposes to make provisions with respect to Sanitary and other like matters to authorise the exchange of certain lauds at Tooting Bee Common to empower the Council of the Metropolitan Borough of Woolwich to purchase Lands for various purposes to change the name of the Metropolitan Fire Brigade to confer various powers upon the London County Council and upon the Councils of Metropolitan Boroughs and for other purposes.
Carlisle Corporation Act 1904 (repealed)	4 Edw. 7. c. ccxlv	15 August 1904
An Act to consolidate the Parishes in the City of Carlisle into one Parish to make further and better provision for the health good government and improvement of the City and for other purposes. (Repealed by Cumbria Act 1982 (c. xv))

=== Private and personal acts ===
Short title	Citation	Royal assent
Long title
Scarisbrick Estate (Amendment) Act 1904	4 Edw. 7. c. 1 Pr.	1 August 1904
An Act to amend the Scarisbrick Estate Act 1877. (Note: Scarisbrick Estate Act 1877 (40 & 41 Vict. c. 6 Pr.))
Lord Tredegar's Supplemental Estate Act 1904	4 Edw. 7. c. 2 Pr.	15 August 1904
An Act for confirming an agreement between the Right Honourable Godfrey Charles Lord Tredegar and the trustees of his settled estates and the Alexandra (Newport and South Wales) Docks and Railway Company for the conveyance to the Company of lands forming part of the settled estates and an agreement between the Company and Lord Tredegar for the issue to Lord Tredegar of a sum of £150,000 preferred ordinary stock of the Company for authorising the trustees of the settled estates to purchase from Lord Tredegar a sum of £50,000 part of such last-mentioned preferred ordinary stock for confirming the purchase by the trustees of the settled estates of a sum of £.50,000 preferred ordinary stock of the Company created and issued under the Alexandra (Newport and South Wales) Docks and Railway Act 1897 (Note: Alexandra (Newport and South Wales) Docks and Railway Act 1897 (60 & 61 Vict. c. clxxxviii)) and for other purposes.
De Trafford Estate Act 1904	4 Edw. 7. c. 3 Pr.	15 August 1904
An Act to enlarge the powers of investment of the Trustees of Sir Humphrey Francis de Trafford's settled estates so as to enable them to purchase his life interest in the settled estates and for vesting such life interest in such Trustees and for other purposes.

=== Sources ===
- Volume 42 - 4 Edward VII - 1904 – via Internet Archive.

== See also ==
- List of acts of the Parliament of the United Kingdom
