= Licensing (Consolidation) Act 1910 =

Act of the Parliament of the United Kingdom

Licensing (Consolidation) Act 1910 (Note: Section 113(1).)
- Act of Parliament
- Parliament of the United Kingdom
- Long title: An Act to consolidate the Law relating to Justices' Licences for the Sale by retail of Intoxicating Liquor and to the Registration of Clubs.
- Citation: 10 Edw. 7 & 1 Geo. 5. c. 24
- Territorial extent: England and Wales (Note: Section 113(3).)

Dates
- Royal assent: 3 August 1910
- Commencement: 1 January 1911 (Note: Section 113(2).)
- Repealed: 1 November 1953
Other legislation
Amends	See § Repealed enactments
Repeals/revokes	See § Repealed enactments
Amended by	Forgery Act 1913; Tithe Act 1936; Justices of the Peace Act 1949
Repealed by	Licensing Act 1953

Status: Repealed

Text of statute as originally enacted

The Licensing (Consolidation) Act 1910 (10 Edw. 7 & 1 Geo. 5. c. 24) was an act of the Parliament of the United Kingdom that consolidated enactments related to justices' licences for the sale by retail of intoxicating liquor and the registration of clubs in England and Wales.

== Provisions ==
=== Repealed enactments ===
Section 112 of the act repealed 13 enactments, listed in the seventh schedule to the act.

Citation	Short title	Extent of repeal
9 Geo. 4. c. 61	Alehouse Act 1828	The whole act.
5 & 6 Vict. c. 44	Licensing Act 1842	Sections one to three and section six.
32 & 33 Vict. c. 27	Wine and Beerhouse Act 1869	The whole act.
33 & 34 Vict. c. 29	Wine and Beerhouse Amendment Act 1870	The whole act.
33 & 34 Vict. c. 111	Beerhouse Act 1870	The whole act.
35 & 36 Vict. c. 94	Licensing Act 1872	The whole act, except sections one, two, twelve, twenty-seven, twenty-eight, thirty-nine, section forty-six so far as it applies to excise licences, the proviso to section seventy-five, and sections seventy-six to ninety.
37 & 38 Vict. c. 49	Licensing Act 1874	The whole act, except sections one, eleven, nineteen, and the definition of "occasional licence" in section thirty-two.
44 & 45 Vict. c. 61	Sunday Closing (Wales) Act 1881	The whole act.
47 & 48 Vict. c. 29	Licensing (Evidence) Act 1884	The whole act.
1 Edw. 7. c. 27	Intoxicating Liquors (Sale to Children) Act 1901	The whole act.
2 Edw. 7. c. 28	Licensing Act 1902	Section four, sections nine to twenty-one, and sections twenty-three to thirty-two.
4 Edw. 7. c. 23	Licensing Act 1904	The whole act.
6 Edw. 7. c. 42	Licensing Act 1906	The whole act.

== Subsequent developments ==
The whole act was repealed by section 168(1) of, and the tenth schedule to, the Licensing Act 1953 (1 & 2 Eliz. 2. c. 46), which came into force on 1 November 1953.
