= Licensing Act 1904 =

Act of the Parliament of the United Kingdom

Licensing Act 1904 (Note: Section 10(1).)
- Act of Parliament
- Parliament of the United Kingdom
- Long title: An Act to amend the Licensing Acts, 1828 to 1902, in respect to the extinction of Licences and the grant of new Licences.
- Citation: 4 Edw. 7. c. 23
- Territorial extent: England and Wales (Note: Section 10(3).)

Dates
- Royal assent: 15 August 1904
- Commencement: 1 January 1905 (Note: Section 10(2).)
- Repealed: 1 January 1911
Other legislation
Amends	Wine and Beerhouse Act 1869; Wine and Beerhouse Amendment Act 1870
Repealed by	Licensing (Consolidation) Act 1910

Status: Repealed

Text of statute as originally enacted

The Licensing Act 1904 (4 Edw. 7. c. 23) was an act of the Parliament of the United Kingdom. The act was controversial, regulating the closure of public houses (pubs) in England and Wales. It was introduced by the Home Secretary, supported by Prime Minister Arthur Balfour and passed by his Conservative Party.

The issue helped the Liberal Party win the 1906 United Kingdom general election by a landslide. The Licensing Act 1904 aimed to reduce the number of pubs. It proposed to compensate brewers for the cancellation of their licence, through a fund the brewers themselves would have to pay into. This led many Nonconformists who adhered to temperance (see United Kingdom Alliance) to denounce it as a "brewers' bill". Meanwhile, the brewers themselves were generally dissatisfied, and they let their customers know.

== Subsequent developments ==
The whole act was repealed by section 112 of, and the seventh schedule to, the Licensing (Consolidation) Act 1910 (10 Edw. 7 & 1 Geo. 5. c. 24), which came into force on 1 January 1911.

== See also ==
- Alcohol licensing laws of the United Kingdom
- Index of drinking establishment–related articles
- Pub
