= List of acts of the Parliament of the United Kingdom from 1920 =

This is a complete list of acts of the Parliament of the United Kingdom for the year 1920.

Note that the first parliament of the United Kingdom was held in 1801; parliaments between 1707 and 1800 were either parliaments of Great Britain or of Ireland). For acts passed up until 1707, see the list of acts of the Parliament of England and the list of acts of the Parliament of Scotland. For acts passed from 1707 to 1800, see the list of acts of the Parliament of Great Britain. See also the list of acts of the Parliament of Ireland.

For acts of the devolved parliaments and assemblies in the United Kingdom, see the list of acts of the Scottish Parliament, the list of acts of the Northern Ireland Assembly, and the list of acts and measures of Senedd Cymru; see also the list of acts of the Parliament of Northern Ireland.

The number shown after each act's title is its chapter number. Acts passed before 1963 are cited using this number, preceded by the year(s) of the reign during which the relevant parliamentary session was held; thus the Union with Ireland Act 1800 is cited as "39 & 40 Geo. 3. c. 67", meaning the 67th act passed during the session that started in the 39th year of the reign of George III and which finished in the 40th year of that reign. Note that the modern convention is to use Arabic numerals in citations (thus "41 Geo. 3" rather than "41 Geo. III"). Acts of the last session of the Parliament of Great Britain and the first session of the Parliament of the United Kingdom are both cited as "41 Geo. 3". Acts passed from 1963 onwards are simply cited by calendar year and chapter number.

== 10 & 11 Geo. 5 ==
The second session of the 31st Parliament of the United Kingdom, which met from 10 February 1920 until 23 December 1920.

This session was also traditionally cited as 10 & 11 G. 5.

=== Public general acts ===
Short title	Citation	Royal assent
Long title
Consolidated Fund (No. 1) Act 1920 (repealed)	10 & 11 Geo. 5. c. 1	26 March 1920
An Act to apply certain sums out of the Consolidated Fund to the service of the years ending on the thirty-first day of March one thousand nine hundred and twenty and one thousand nine hundred and twenty-one. (Repealed by Statute Law Revision Act 1927 (17 & 18 Geo. 5. c. 42))
Merchant Shipping (Amendment) Act 1920 (repealed)	10 & 11 Geo. 5. c. 2	26 March 1920
An Act to amend section six hundred and fifty-nine of the Merchant Shipping Act, 1894. (Note: Merchant Shipping Act 1894 (57 & 58 Vict. c. 60)) (Repealed by Merchant Shipping Act 1995 (c. 21))
Coinage Act 1920 (repealed)	10 & 11 Geo. 5. c. 3	31 March 1920
An Act to amend the Law in respect of the Standard Fineness of Silver Coins current in the United Kingdom and in other parts of His Majesty's Dominions. (Repealed by Coinage Act 1971 (c. 24))
Coal Mines (Emergency) Act 1920 (repealed)	10 & 11 Geo. 5. c. 4	31 March 1920
An Act to make temporary provision on account of the emergency arising from the war as to the profits and control of, wages in, and advances in respect of, colliery undertakings, and for purposes connected therewith. (Repealed by Statute Law Revision Act 1927 (17 & 18 Geo. 5. c. 42) and Statute Law Revision Act 1953 (2 & 3 Eliz. 2. c. 5))
War Emergency Laws (Continuance) Act 1920 (repealed)	10 & 11 Geo. 5. c. 5	31 March 1920
An Act to continue temporarily certain emergency enactments and regulations, and to make provision with respect to the expiration or revocation of emergency enactments and instruments made thereunder. (Repealed by Statute Law (Repeals) Act 1978 (c. 45))
Treaties of Peace (Austria and Bulgaria) Act 1920 (repealed)	10 & 11 Geo. 5. c. 6	27 April 1920
An Act to carry into effect Treaties of Peace between His Majesty and certain other Powers. (Repealed by Statute Law Revision Act 1966 (c. 5))
Army and Air Force (Annual) Act 1920 (repealed)	10 & 11 Geo. 5. c. 7	27 April 1920
An Act to provide, during Twelve Months, or the Discipline and Regulation of the Army and Air Force, and to repeal certain provisions in section twelve of the Air Force (Constitution) Act, 1917. (Note: Air Force (Constitution) Act 1917 (7 & 8 Geo. 5. c. 51)) (Repealed by Army and Air Force (Annual) Act 1923 (13 & 14 Geo. 5. c. 3) (Note: Incorrectly cited as "c 22" in the Chronological Table of the Statutes.), Statute Law Revision Act 1927 (17 & 18 Geo. 5. c. 42), Statute Law Revision Act 1950 (14 Geo. 6. c. 6) and Revision of the Army and Air Force Acts (Transitional Provisions) Act 1955 (3 & 4 Eliz. 2. c. 20))
House-Letting and Rating (Scotland) Act 1920 (repealed)	10 & 11 Geo. 5. c. 8	20 May 1920
An Act to further amend the Law as to the Letting and Rating of small Dwelling-Houses in Scotland. (Repealed by Local Government (Scotland) Act 1973 (c. 65))
Public Utility Companies (Capital Issues) Act 1920 (repealed)	10 & 11 Geo. 5. c. 9	20 May 1920
An Act to provide for the variation of the provisions regulating the raising of Capital by Companies carrying on certain statutory undertakings. (Repealed by Statute Law Revision Act 1927 (17 & 18 Geo. 5. c. 42))
National Health Insurance Act 1920 (repealed)	10 & 11 Geo. 5. c. 10	20 May 1920
An Act to amend the Acts relating to National Health Insurance. (Repealed by National Health Insurance Act 1936 (26 Geo. 5 & 1 Edw. 8. c. 32))
Ejection (Suspensory) (Scotland) Act 1920 (repealed)	10 & 11 Geo. 5. c. 11	20 May 1920
An Act to make temporary provision for restricting the granting of orders for recovery of possession of, or the ejection of tenants from, certain dwelling-houses in Scotland. (Repealed by Statute Law Revision Act 1927 (17 & 18 Geo. 5. c. 42))
Savings Banks Act 1920 (repealed)	10 & 11 Geo. 5. c. 12	20 May 1920
An Act to amend the Enactments relating to Savings Banks; to extend to National Savings Certificates the enactments relating to War Savings Certificates; and to amend the law with respect to the transfer of Government stock by Savings Bank authorities. (Repealed by National Debt Act 1958 (7 & 8 Eliz. 2. c. 6))
Profiteering (Amendment) Act 1920 (repealed)	10 & 11 Geo. 5. c. 13	20 May 1920
An Act to amend and extend the duration of the Profiteering Acts, 1919. (Note: Profiteering Act 1919 (9 & 10 Geo. 5. c. 66)) (Note: Profiteering (Continuance) Act 1919 (9 & 10 Geo. 5. c. 87)) (Repealed by Statute Law Revision Act 1927 (17 & 18 Geo. 5. c. 42))
Tramways (Temporary Increase of Charges) Act 1920 (repealed)	10 & 11 Geo. 5. c. 14	20 May 1920
An Act to make further provision for the temporary modification of the charges which may be made in respect of and the obligations affecting Tramway Undertakings. (Repealed for England and Wales and Scotland by Statute Law Revision Act 1950 (14 Geo. 6. c. 6) and for Northern Ireland by Statute Law Revision Act 1927 (17 & 18 Geo. 5. c. 42) and Statute Law Revision Act (Northern Ireland) 1954 (c. 35 (N.I.)))
Representation of the People Act 1920 (repealed)	10 & 11 Geo. 5. c. 15	2 July 1920
An Act to remove doubts as to the interpretation of subsection (4) of section five of the Representation of the People Act, 1918. (Note: Representation of the People Act 1918 (7 & 8 Geo. 5. c. 64)) (Repealed by Statute Law Revision Act 1927 (17 & 18 Geo. 5. c. 42))
Imperial War Museum Act 1920	10 & 11 Geo. 5. c. 16	2 July 1920
An Act to make provision for the management of the Imperial War Museum and for other purposes connected therewith.
Increase of Rent and Mortgage Interest (Restrictions) Act 1920 (repealed)	10 & 11 Geo. 5. c. 17	2 July 1920
An Act to consolidate and amend the Law with respect to the increase of rent and recovery of possession of premises in certain cases, and the increase of the rate of interest on, and the calling in of securities on such premises, and for purposes in connection therewith. (Repealed for England and Wales by Rent Act 1968 (c. 23), for Scotland by Rent (Scotland) Act 1971 (c. 28) and for Northern Ireland by Rent (Northern Ireland) Order 1978 (SI 1978/1050 (N.I. 20)))
Finance Act 1920	10 & 11 Geo. 5. c. 18	4 August 1920
An Act to grant certain duties of Customs and Inland Revenue (including Excise), to alter other duties, and to amend the Law relating to Customs and Inland Revenue (including Excise), and the National Debt, and to make further provision in connection with Finance.
County Councils Association Expenses (Amendment) Act 1920 (repealed)	10 & 11 Geo. 5. c. 19	4 August 1920
An Act to authorise an increase in the amount of certain payments by County Councils to the County Councils Association. (Repealed by County Councils Association Expenses (Amendment) Act 1937 (1 Edw. 8 & 1 Geo. 6. c. 27))
Veterinary Surgeons Act (1881) Amendment Act 1920 (repealed)	10 & 11 Geo. 5. c. 20	4 August 1920
An Act to amend the Acts relating to the Practice of Veterinary Surgery and Medicine. (Repealed by Statute Law Revision Act 1959 (7 & 8 Eliz. 2. c. 68))
Harbours, Docks, and Piers (Temporary Increase of Charges) Act 1920 (repealed)	10 & 11 Geo. 5. c. 21	4 August 1920
An Act to make provision for the temporary modification of the charges which may be made in respect of Ports, Harbour, Dock, and Pier Undertakings. (Repealed by Statute Law Revision Act 1966 (c. 5))
Ecclesiastical Tithe Rentcharge (Rates) Act 1920 (repealed)	10 & 11 Geo. 5. c. 22	4 August 1920
An Act to reduce temporarily the rates payable in respect of Ecclesiastical Tithe Rentcharge. (Repealed by Tithe Act 1925 (15 & 16 Geo. 5. c. 87))
War Pensions Act 1920	10 & 11 Geo. 5. c. 23	4 August 1920
An Act to amend the War Pensions Acts, 1915 to 1919, and the Ministry of Pensions Act, 1916. (Note: Ministry of Pensions Act 1916 (6 & 7 Geo. 5. c. 65))
Bank Notes (Ireland) Act 1920	10 & 11 Geo. 5. c. 24	4 August 1920
An Act to amend the Law with respect to the Place of Payment of Notes issued by Banks of Issue in Ireland.
Public Libraries (Ireland) Act 1920 (repealed)	10 & 11 Geo. 5. c. 25	4 August 1920
An Act to amend section eight of the Public Libraries (Ireland) Act, 1855, (Note: Public Libraries (Ireland) Act 1855 (18 & 19 Vict. c. 40)) and for other purposes incidental thereto. (Repealed by Statute Law Revision Act 1927 (17 & 18 Geo. 5. c. 42) and Public Health and Local Government (Administrative Provisions) Act (Northern Ireland) 1946 (c. 19 (N.I.)))
Sheriffs (Ireland) Act 1920	10 & 11 Geo. 5. c. 26	4 August 1920
An Act to amend the Law relating to the offices of Sheriff and Under-Sheriff in Ireland; and for other purposes incidental thereto.
Nauru Island Agreement Act 1920 (repealed)	10 & 11 Geo. 5. c. 27	4 August 1920
An Act to confirm an Agreement made between His Majesty's Government in London, His Majesty's Government of the Commonwealth of Australia, and His Majesty's Government of the Dominion of New Zealand, in relation to the Island of Nauru. (Repealed by Statute Law (Repeals) Act 1986 (c. 12))
Gas Regulation Act 1920 (repealed)	10 & 11 Geo. 5. c. 28	4 August 1920
An Act to amend the Law with respect to the supply of Gas. (Repealed for England and Wales and Scotland by Gas Act 1948 (11 & 12 Geo. 6. c. 67) and for Northern Ireland by Gas (Northern Ireland) Order 1977 (SI 1977/596 (N.I. 7)))
Overseas Trade (Credits and Insurance) Act 1920 (repealed)	10 & 11 Geo. 5. c. 29	9 August 1920
An Act to authorise the granting of Credits and the undertaking of Insurances for the purpose of re-establishing Overseas Trade. (Repealed by Export Guarantees Act 1937 (1 Edw. 8 & 1 Geo. 6. c. 61))
Unemployment Insurance Act 1920 (repealed)	10 & 11 Geo. 5. c. 30	9 August 1920
An Act to amend the Law in respect of Insurance against Unemployment. (Repealed for England and Wales and Scotland by Unemployment Insurance Act 1935 (25 & 26 Geo. 5. c. 8) and for Northern Ireland by Unemployment Insurance Act (Northern Ireland) 1936 (26 Geo. 5 & 1 Edw. 8. c. 30 (N.I.)))
Restoration of Order in Ireland Act 1920 (repealed)	10 & 11 Geo. 5. c. 31	9 August 1920
An Act to make provision for the Restoration and Maintenance of Order in Ireland. (Repealed by Statute Law Revision Act 1953 (2 & 3 Eliz. 2. c. 5))
Appropriation Act 1920 (repealed)	10 & 11 Geo. 5. c. 32	16 August 1920
An Act to apply certain sums out of the Consolidated Fund to the service of the years ending on the thirty-first day of March one thousand nine hundred and nineteen and one thousand nine hundred and twenty-one, and to appropriate the Supplies granted in this Session of Parliament. (Repealed by Statute Law Revision Act 1927 (17 & 18 Geo. 5. c. 42))
Maintenance Orders (Facilities for Enforcement) Act 1920	10 & 11 Geo. 5. c. 33	16 August 1920
An Act to facilitate the enforcement in England and Ireland of Maintenance Orders made in other parts of His Majesty’s Dominions and Protectorates and vice versa.
Duplicands of Feu-duties (Scotland) Act 1920 (repealed)	10 & 11 Geo. 5. c. 34	16 August 1920
An Act to amend the law relating to the payment of duplicands of feu-duties in Scotland. (Repealed by Abolition of Feudal Tenure etc. (Scotland) Act 2000 (asp 5))
Representation of the People (No. 2) Act 1920 (repealed)	10 & 11 Geo. 5. c. 35	16 August 1920
An Act to make further provision with respect to the time for the counting of Votes at Parliamentary Elections, and to amend the Law with respect to the right of voting by proxy; and for purposes connected therewith. (Repealed by Representation of the People Act 1948 (11 & 12 Geo. 6. c. 65))
Pensions (Increase) Act 1920 (repealed)	10 & 11 Geo. 5. c. 36	16 August 1920
An Act to authorise the Increase of certain Pensions. (Repealed for England and Wales and Scotland by Pensions (Increase) Act 1971 (c. 56) and for Northern Ireland by Pensions (Increase) Act (Northern Ireland) 1971 (c. 35 (N.I.)))
Telegraph (Money) Act 1920 (repealed)	10 & 11 Geo. 5. c. 37	16 August 1920
An Act to provide for raising further Money for the purpose of the Telegraph Acts, 1863 to 1916, and to amend section four of the Telegraph (Money) Act, 1876. (Note: Telegraph (Money) Act 1876 (39 & 40 Vict. c. 5)) (Repealed by Post Office and Telegraph (Money) Act 1950 (14 Geo. 6. c. 2) and Statute Law Revision Act 1953 (2 & 3 Eliz. 2. c. 5))
Resident Magistrates (Ireland) Act 1920 (repealed)	10 & 11 Geo. 5. c. 38	16 August 1920
An Act to amend the Law relating to the Salaries and Allowances of Resident Magistrates in Ireland. (Repealed by Magistrates' Courts Act (Northern Ireland) 1964 (c. 21 (N.I.)))
Merchant Shipping (Scottish Fishing Boats) Act 1920 (repealed)	10 & 11 Geo. 5. c. 39	16 August 1920
An Act to provide for the extension to Scotland of Part IV of the Merchant Shipping Act, 1894. (Repealed by Merchant Shipping Act 1995 (c. 21))
Post Office and Telegraph Act 1920 (repealed)	10 & 11 Geo. 5. c. 40	16 August 1920
An Act to amend the Law with respect to the statutory limits on Postal and Telegraph Rates, and with respect to the remuneration to be paid to railway companies for the conveyance of Postal Parcels, and otherwise to amend the Post Office Acts, 1908 to 1915. (Repealed by Post Office Act 1953 (1 & 2 Eliz. 2. c. 36))
Census Act 1920	10 & 11 Geo. 5. c. 41	16 August 1920
An Act to make provision for the taking from time to time of a Census for Great Britain or any area therein and for otherwise obtaining Statistical Information with respect to the Population of Great Britain.
Census (Ireland) Act 1920 (repealed)	10 & 11 Geo. 5. c. 42	16 August 1920
An Act for taking the Census for Ireland in the year nineteen hundred and twenty-one. (Repealed by Statute Law Revision Act 1927 (17 & 18 Geo. 5. c. 42))
Firearms Act 1920 (repealed)	10 & 11 Geo. 5. c. 43	16 August 1920
An Act to amend the Law relating to Firearms and other Weapons and Ammunition, and to amend the Unlawful Drilling Act, 1819. (Note: Unlawful Drilling Act 1819 (60 Geo. 3 & 1 Geo. 4. c. 1)) (Repealed by Statute Law (Repeals) Act 1995 (c. 44))
Fertilisers (Temporary Control of Export) Act 1920 (repealed)	10 & 11 Geo. 5. c. 44	16 August 1920
An Act to control temporarily the Exportation of certain Fertilisers. (Repealed by Expiring Laws Act 1922 (12 & 13 Geo. 5. c. 50))
Public Libraries (Scotland) Act 1920 (repealed)	10 & 11 Geo. 5. c. 45	16 August 1920
An Act to amend the Public Libraries Consolidation (Scotland) Act, 1887. (Note: Public Libraries Consolidation (Scotland) Act 1887 (50 & 51 Vict. c. 42)) (Repealed by Local Government (Scotland) Act 1973 (c. 65))
Dangerous Drugs Act 1920 (repealed)	10 & 11 Geo. 5. c. 46	16 August 1920
An Act to regulate the Importation, Exportation, Manufacture, Sale and Use of Opium and other Dangerous Drugs. (Repealed by Dangerous Drugs Act 1951 (14 & 15 Geo. 6. c. 48))
Ministry of Food (Continuance) Act 1920 (repealed)	10 & 11 Geo. 5. c. 47	16 August 1920
An Act to continue temporarily the office of Food Controller and to make further provision with respect to his powers, and for purposes in connexion therewith. (Repealed by Statute Law Revision Act 1927 (17 & 18 Geo. 5. c. 42) and Statute Law Revision Act 1950 (14 Geo. 6. c. 6))
Indemnity Act 1920 (repealed)	10 & 11 Geo. 5. c. 48	16 August 1920
An Act to restrict the taking of legal proceedings in respect of certain acts and matters done during the war, and provide in certain cases remedies in substitution therefor, and to validate certain proclamations, orders, licences, ordinances, and other laws issued, made, and passed, and sentences, judgments, and orders of certain courts given and made during the war. (Repealed by Statute Law Revision Act 1927 (17 & 18 Geo. 5. c. 42), Statute Law Revision Act 1950 (14 Geo. 6. c. 6) and Statute Law Revision Act 1953 (2 & 3 Eliz. 2. c. 5))
Blind Persons Act 1920 (repealed)	10 & 11 Geo. 5. c. 49	16 August 1920
An Act to promote the Welfare of Blind Persons. (Repealed for England and Wales and Scotland by National Assistance Act 1948 (11 & 12 Geo. 6. c. 29) and for Northern Ireland by Old Age Pensions Act (Northern Ireland) 1936 (26 Geo. 5 & 1 Edw. 8. c. 31 (N.I.)), Welfare Services Act (Northern Ireland) 1949 (c. 1 (N.I.)), Children and Young Persons Act (Northern Ireland) 1950 (c. 5 (N.I.)) and Statute Law Revision Act (Northern Ireland) 1954 (c. 35 (N.I.)))
Mining Industry Act 1920 (repealed)	10 & 11 Geo. 5. c. 50	16 August 1920
An Act to provide for the better administration of mines, and to regulate the coal industry, and for other purposes connected with the mining industry and the persons employed therein. (Repealed by Deregulation Act 2015 (c. 20))
Duchy of Lancaster Act 1920	10 & 11 Geo. 5. c. 51	16 August 1920
An Act to make provision with respect to the administration of the estates of the Duchy of Lancaster, and with respect to the solicitor for the affairs of the said Duchy.
Ready Money Football Betting Act 1920 (repealed)	10 & 11 Geo. 5. c. 52	16 August 1920
An Act to prevent the writing, printing, publishing, or circulating in the United Kingdom of Advertisements, Circulars, or Coupons of any Ready Money Football Betting Business. (Repealed for England and Wales and Scotland by Betting and Gaming Act 1960 (8 & 9 Eliz. 2. c. 60) and for Northern Ireland by Betting, Gaming, Lotteries and Amusements (Northern Ireland) Order 1985 (SI 1985/1204 (N.I. 11)))
Jurors (Enrolment of Women) (Scotland) Act 1920 (repealed)	10 & 11 Geo. 5. c. 53	16 August 1920
An Act to provide for the qualification of and manner of enrolling Women as Jurors in Scotland. (Repealed by Law Reform (Miscellaneous Provisions) (Scotland) Act 1985 (c. 73))
Seeds Act 1920 (repealed)	10 & 11 Geo. 5. c. 54	16 August 1920
An Act to amend the Law with respect to the Sale and Use of Seeds for sowing and of Seed Potatoes and to provide for the testing thereof. (Repealed for England and Wales and Scotland by Plant Varieties and Seeds Act 1964 (c. 14) and for Northern Ireland by Seeds Act (Northern Ireland) 1965 (c. 22 (N.I.)))
Emergency Powers Act 1920 (repealed)	10 & 11 Geo. 5. c. 55	29 October 1920
An Act to make exceptional provision for the Protection of the Community in cases of Emergency. (Repealed by Civil Contingencies Act 2004 (c. 36))
Places of Worship (Enfranchisement) Act 1920	10 & 11 Geo. 5. c. 56	3 December 1920
An Act to authorise the Enfranchisement of the Sites of Places of Worship held under Lease.
Unemployment (Relief Works) Act 1920 (repealed)	10 & 11 Geo. 5. c. 57	3 December 1920
An Act to make better provision for the employment of unemployed persons by facilitating the acquisition of, and entry on, land required for works of public utility, and for purposes connected therewith. (Repealed by Statute Law Revision Act 1950 (14 Geo. 6. c. 6))
Shops (Early Closing) Act 1920 (repealed)	10 & 11 Geo. 5. c. 58	3 December 1920
An Act to continue temporarily and give effect to certain orders relating to the early closing of shops and for purposes connected therewith. (Repealed by Shops (Hours of Closing) Act 1928 (18 & 19 Geo. 5. c. 33))
Appropriation (No. 2) Act 1920 (repealed)	10 & 11 Geo. 5. c. 59	23 December 1920
An Act to apply a sum out of the Consolidated Fund to the service of the year ending on the thirty-first day of March, one thousand nine hundred and twenty-one, and to appropriate the further Supplies granted in this Session of Parliament. (Repealed by Statute Law Revision Act 1927 (17 & 18 Geo. 5. c. 42))
Isle of Man (Customs) Act 1920 (repealed)	10 & 11 Geo. 5. c. 60	23 December 1920
An Act to amend the Law with respect to Customs in the Isle of Man. (Repealed by Statute Law Revision Act 1927 (17 & 18 Geo. 5. c. 42))
Public Works Loans Act 1920 (repealed)	10 & 11 Geo. 5. c. 61	23 December 1920
An Act to grant money for the purpose of certain Local Loans out of the Local Loans Fund, and for other purposes relating to Local Loans. (Repealed by Statute Law Revision Act 1927 (17 & 18 Geo. 5. c. 42))
Women and Young Persons (Employment in Lead Processes) Act 1920 (repealed)	10 & 11 Geo. 5. c. 62	23 December 1920
An Act to make provision for the better protection of Women and young Persons Against Lead Poisoning. (Repealed for England and Wales and Scotland by Factories Act 1937 (1 Edw. 8 & 1 Geo. 6. c. 67) and for Northern Ireland by Factories Act (Northern Ireland) 1938 (1 & 2 Geo. 6. c. 23 (N.I.)))
Married Women (Maintenance) Act 1920 (repealed)	10 & 11 Geo. 5. c. 63	23 December 1920
An Act to provide for the inclusion in Orders made under the Summary Jurisdiction (Married Women) Act, 1895, (Note: Summary Jurisdiction (Married Women) Act 1895 (58 & 59 Vict. c. 39)) of a provision for the Maintenance of the Children of the Marriage under sixteen. (Repealed by Matrimonial Proceedings (Magistrates' Courts) Act 1960 (8 & 9 Eliz. 2. c. 48))
Married Women's Property (Scotland) Act 1920 (repealed)	10 & 11 Geo. 5. c. 64	23 December 1920
An Act to amend the Law regarding the Property of Married Women in Scotland. (Repealed by Family Law (Scotland) Act 1985 (c. 37))
Employment of Women, Young Persons, and Children Act 1920	10 & 11 Geo. 5. c. 65	23 December 1920
An Act to carry out certain Conventions relating to the employment of Women, Young Persons, and Children, and to amend the law with respect to the employment of Women and Young Persons in Factories and Workshops.
Criminal Injuries (Ireland) Act 1920 (repealed)	10 & 11 Geo. 5. c. 66	23 December 1920
An Act to amend the enactments relative to Compensation for Criminal Injuries in Ireland. (Repealed by Criminal Injuries to Property (Compensation) Act (Northern Ireland) 1971 (c. 38 (N.I.)))
Government of Ireland Act 1920 (repealed)	10 & 11 Geo. 5. c. 67	23 December 1920
An Act to provide for the better Government of Ireland. (Repealed by Northern Ireland Act 1998 (c. 47))
Juvenile Courts (Metropolis) Act 1920 (repealed)	10 & 11 Geo. 5. c. 68	23 December 1920
An Act to amend section one hundred and eleven of the Children's Act with respect to the constitution of Juvenile Courts in the Metropolitan Police Court District. (Repealed by Children and Young Persons Act 1932 (22 & 23 Geo. 5. c. 46))
Registrar General (Scotland) Act 1920 (repealed)	10 & 11 Geo. 5. c. 69	23 December 1920
An Act to amend the law relating to the appointment of a Registrar General of Births, Deaths, and Marriages in Scotland. (Repealed by Registration of Births, Deaths and Marriages (Scotland) Act 1965 (c. 49))
Gold and Silver (Export Control, etc.) Act 1920 (repealed)	10 & 11 Geo. 5. c. 70	23 December 1920
An Act to control the exportation of gold and silver coin and bullion, and to prohibit the melting or improper use of gold and silver coin. (Repealed by Decimal Currency Act 1969 (c. 19))
Housing (Scotland) Act 1920 (repealed)	10 & 11 Geo. 5. c. 71	23 December 1920
An Act to amend the Law relating to Housing in Scotland, and for purposes in connexion therewith. (Repealed by Housing (Scotland) Act 1925 (15 & 16 Geo. 5. c. 15), Town Planning (Scotland) Act 1925 (15 & 16 Geo. 5. c. 17), Statute Law Revision Act 1927 (17 & 18 Geo. 5. c. 42), Housing (Scotland) Act 1935 (25 & 26 Geo. 5. c. 41) and Statute Law Revision Act 1950 (14 Geo. 6. c. 6))
Roads Act 1920 (repealed)	10 & 11 Geo. 5. c. 72	23 December 1920
An Act to make provision for the collection and application of the excise duties on mechanically-propelled vehicles and on carriages; to amend the Finance Act, 1920, (Note: Finance Act 1920 (10 & 11 Geo. 5. c. 18)) as respects such duties; and to amend the Motor Car Acts, 1896 (Note: Locomotives on Highways Act 1896 (59 & 60 Vict. c. 36)) and 1903, (Note: Motor Car Act 1903 (3 Edw. 7. c. 36)) and the Development and Road Improvement Funds Act, 1909; (Note: Development and Road Improvement Funds Act 1909 (9 Edw. 7. c. 47)) and to make other provision with respect to roads and vehicles used on roads, and for purposes connected therewith. (Repealed by Statute Law (Repeals) Act 2004 (c. 14))
Expiring Laws Continuance Act 1920 (repealed)	10 & 11 Geo. 5. c. 73	23 December 1920
An Act to continue certain Expiring Laws. (Repealed by Statute Law Revision Act 1927 (17 & 18 Geo. 5. c. 42))
British Empire Exhibition (Guarantee) Act 1920 (repealed)	10 & 11 Geo. 5. c. 74	23 December 1920
An Act to enable the Board of Trade to guarantee part of the expenses of a British Empire Exhibition. (Repealed by Statute Law Revision Act 1927 (17 & 18 Geo. 5. c. 42))
Official Secrets Act 1920	10 & 11 Geo. 5. c. 75	23 December 1920
An Act to amend the Official Secrets Act, 1911. (Note: Official Secrets Act 1911 (1 & 2 Geo. 5. c. 28))
Agriculture Act 1920 (repealed)	10 & 11 Geo. 5. c. 76	23 December 1920
An Act to amend the Corn Production Act, 1917, (Note: Corn Production Act 1917 (7 & 8 Geo. 5. c. 46)) and the Enactments relating to Agricultural Holdings. (Repealed by Statute Law Revision Act 1958 (6 & 7 Eliz. 2. c. 46))
Dyestuffs (Import Regulation) Act 1920 (repealed)	10 & 11 Geo. 5. c. 77	23 December 1920
An Act to regulate the importation of dyestuffs. (Repealed by European Free Trade Association Act 1960 (8 & 9 Eliz. 2. c. 19))
Juries (Emergency Provisions) Act 1920 (repealed)	10 & 11 Geo. 5. c. 78	23 December 1920
An Act to make provision for removing certain difficulties with respect to the summoning of Juries in certain cities, boroughs and towns in England, and for removing doubts as to the validity of certain verdicts. (Repealed by Statute Law Revision Act 1927 (17 & 18 Geo. 5. c. 42))
Defence of the Realm (Acquisition of Land) Act 1920	10 & 11 Geo. 5. c. 79	23 December 1920
An Act to amend the Defence of the Realm (Acquisition of Land) Act, 1916, (Note: Defence of the Realm (Acquisition of Land) Act 1916 (6 & 7 Geo. 5. c. 63)) and to continue certain byelaws.
Air Navigation Act 1920 (repealed)	10 & 11 Geo. 5. c. 80	23 December 1920
An Act to enable effect to be given to a Convention for regulating Air Navigation, and to make further provision for the control and regulation of aviation. (Repealed by Civil Aviation Act 1949 (12, 13 & 14 Geo. 6. c. 67))
Administration of Justice Act 1920	10 & 11 Geo. 5. c. 81	23 December 1920
An Act to amend the law with respect to the administration of justice and with respect to the constitution of the Supreme Court, to facilitate the reciprocal enforcement of judgments and awards in the United Kingdom and other parts of His Majesty's Dominions or Territories under His Majesty's protection, and to regulate the fees chargeable by, and on the registration of, Commissioners for Oaths.
Unemployment Insurance (Temporary Provisions Amendment) Act 1920 (repealed)	10 & 11 Geo. 5. c. 82	23 December 1920
An Act to amend section forty-four of the Unemployment Insurance Act, 1920. (Note: Unemployment Insurance Act 1920 (10 & 11 Geo. 5. c. 30)) (Repealed by Statute Law Revision Act 1927 (17 & 18 Geo. 5. c. 42))

=== Local acts ===
Short title	Citation	Royal assent
Long title
City of Dublin Steam Packet Company's Act 1920 (repealed)	10 & 11 Geo. 5. c. i	31 March 1920
An Act to enable the City of Dublin Steam Packet Company to increase the nominal amount of the Ordinary Stock of the Company. (Repealed by Statute Law (Repeals) Act 2013 (c. 2))
Colonial and Foreign Banks Guarantee Corporation (Transfer and Alliance Assurance) Act 1920	10 & 11 Geo. 5. c. ii	31 March 1920
An Act to provide for the transfer of the business of the Colonial and Foreign Banks Guarantee Corporation to the Alliance Assurance Company, Limited, and for other purposes.
Henry Bath and Son's (Delivery Warrants) Act 1890 Amendment Act 1920	10 & 11 Geo. 5. c. iii	31 March 1920
An Act to amend Henry Bath and Son's (Delivery Warrants) Act, 1890. (Note: Henry Bath and Son's (Delivery Warrants) Act 1890 (53 & 54 Vict. c. ii))
Price's Patent Candle Company Limited Act 1920 or the Price's Patent Candle Company's Act 1920	10 & 11 Geo. 5. c. iv	20 May 1920
An Act to confer further powers upon Price's Patent Candle Company Limited to repeal certain provisions of its existing Acts and for other purposes.
Abertillery District Water Board Act 1920 (repealed)	10 & 11 Geo. 5. c. v	20 May 1920
An Act to extend the periods limited by the Abertillery and District Water Board Acts 1910 (Note: Abertillery and District Water Board Act 1910 (10 Edw. 7 & 1 Geo. 5. c. cxxv)) and 1914 (Note: Abertillery and District Water Board Act 1914 (4 & 5 Geo. 5. c. xxiv)) for the construction of certain works; and for other purposes. (Repealed by Gwent Water Board Order 1969 (SI 1969/1475))
South Wales Electrical Power Distribution Company Act 1920	10 & 11 Geo. 5. c. vi	20 May 1920
An Act to make further provision in regard to the undertaking of the South Wales Electrical Power Distribution Distribution Company.
Rugby Gas Act 1920	10 & 11 Geo. 5. c. vii	20 May 1920
An Act to confer further powers on the Rugby Gas Company, and for other purposes.
River Lee Watershed (Flood Prevention) Act 1920 (repealed)	10 & 11 Geo. 5. c. viii	20 May 1920
An Act to empower the Lee Conservancy Board to prepare a Scheme or Schemes for the Regulation and Mitigation of the Flooding of Lands in the Watershed of the River Lee and its Tributaries and for other purposes. (Repealed by Lee Conservancy Catchment Board (Additional Functions) Regulations 1947 (SR&O 1947/2797))
Ebbw Vale Urban District Council Act 1920	10 & 11 Geo. 5. c. ix	20 May 1920
An Act to extend the period limited by the Ebbw Vale Water Act, 1913, (Note: Ebbw Vale Water Act 1913 (3 & 4 Geo. 5. c. lxxxv)) and the Ebbw Vale Urban District Council Act, 1917, (Note: Ebbw Vale Urban District Council Act 1917 (7 & 8 Geo. 5. c. xl)) for the purchase of certain lands and the construction of certain works, and for other purposes.
Farmers Land Purchase Company's Act 1920	10 & 11 Geo. 5. c. x	20 May 1920
An Act for incorporating and conferring powers on the Farmers Land Purchase Company.
Lands Improvement Company's Amendment Act 1920	10 & 11 Geo. 5. c. xi	20 May 1920
An Act to confer further powers upon the Lands Improvement Company.
Llantrisant and Llantwit Fardre Rural District Council Act 1920	10 & 11 Geo. 5. c. xii	20 May 1920
An Act to confer powers on the Llantrisant and Llantwit Fardre Rural District Council with reference to the borrowing of money and the supply of water, and for other purposes.
Penllwyn Railway (Abandonment) Act 1920	10 & 11 Geo. 5. c. xiii	20 May 1920
An Act for the abandonment of the undertaking and winding-up and dissolution of the Penllwyn Railway Company, and for matters incidental thereto.
Tyne Improvement Act 1920 (repealed)	10 & 11 Geo. 5. c. xiv	20 May 1920
An Act to authorise the Tyne Improvement Commissioners to acquire further lands and to levy increased dues rates tolls and charges; and for other purposes. (Repealed by Port of Tyne Reorganisation Scheme 1967 Confirmation Order 1968 (SI 1968/942))
Great Eastern Railway Act 1920	10 & 11 Geo. 5. c. xv	20 May 1920
An Act for conferring further powers upon the Great Eastern Railway Company.
Lancaster Corporation Water Act 1920	10 & 11 Geo. 5. c. xvi	20 May 1920
An Act to make further provision with respect to the water undertaking of the Mayor, Aldermen and Burgesses of the borough of Lancaster.
Ministry of Health Provisional Order (1919) Confirmation (Housing) Act 1920 (repealed)	10 & 11 Geo. 5. c. xvii	20 May 1920
An Act to confirm a Provisional Order of the Minister of Health relating to Blaydon. (Repealed by Tyne & Wear Act 1980 (c. xliii))
	Blaydon Order 1919	
Local Government Board (Ireland) Provisional Orders Confirmation (No. 1) Act 1920	10 & 11 Geo. 5. c. xviii	20 May 1920
An Act to confirm certain Provisional Orders of the Local Government Board for Ireland relating to the Dublin Port Sanitary Authority, the urban districts of Killiney and Ballybrack and Sligo, and the county of Limerick.
	Dublin Port Sanitary Order 1920	
	Killiney and Ballybrack Order 1920	
	Sligo Order 1920	
	Mulkear River Drainage Order 1920	
Humber Commercial Railway and Dock Act 1920	10 & 11 Geo. 5. c. xix	2 July 1920
An Act to provide for the redemption of the debentures issued by the Humber Commercial Railway and Dock Company and for an increase of the rent payable by the Great Central Railway Company under the lease of the Humber Commercial Railway and Dock Company's undertaking.
Maidenhead Gas Act 1920	10 & 11 Geo. 5. c. xx	2 July 1920
An Act to authorise the Maidenhead Gas Company to acquire further lands for gas works.
Risca Urban District Council Act 1920	10 & 11 Geo. 5. c. xxi	2 July 1920
An Act to confer further powers on the Urban District Council of Risca in regard to their gas undertaking; to authorise the council to provide and run omnibuses, and to make further provision for the improvement, health, and local government of their district, and for other purposes.
Llandrindod Wells Urban District Council Act 1920	10 & 11 Geo. 5. c. xxii	2 July 1920
An Act to confer powers upon the Urban District Council of the Urban District of Llandrindod Wells in the County of Radnor with reference to the utilisation of certain Springs and the provision of pump rooms and baths; to confer further financial and other powers upon the Council; and for other purposes.
Marsham Urban District Council Act 1920	10 & 11 Geo. 5. c. xxiii	2 July 1920
An Act to confer powers upon the Masham Urban District Council with regard to the supply of gas and electricity, and for other purposes.
Severn Navigation Act 1920	10 & 11 Geo. 5. c. xxiv	2 July 1920
An Act to confer further powers on the Severn Commissioners.
North Metropolitan Electric Power Supply Act 1920 (repealed)	10 & 11 Geo. 5. c. xxv	2 July 1920
An Act to confer further powers upon the North Metropolitan Electric Power Supply Company. (Repealed by North Metropolitan Electric Power Supply (Consolidation) Act 1928 (18 & 19 Geo. 5. c. cxviii))
Great Yarmouth Waterworks Act 1920	10 & 11 Geo. 5. c. xxvi	2 July 1920
An Act to alter the rates for the supply of water by the Great Yarmouth Waterworks Company, and for other purposes.
City of London (Various Powers) Act 1920	10 & 11 Geo. 5. c. xxvii	2 July 1920
An Act to extend the time for the completion of street improvements at Spitalfields, and to confer further powers upon the Corporation of London with respect to certain of their markets and in regard to the City of London police, and for other purposes.
Corporation of London (Rating of Reclaimed Lands) Act 1920	10 & 11 Geo. 5. c. xxviii	2 July 1920
An Act to repeal the exemption from rating of certain lands reclaimed from the River Thames.
Wandsworth, Wimbledon and Epsom District Gas Act 1920	10 & 11 Geo. 5. c. xxix	2 July 1920
An Act to confer further powers upon the Wandsworth, Wimbledon, and Epsom District Gas Company, and for other purposes.
South Hants Water Act 1920	10 & 11 Geo. 5. c. xxx	2 July 1920
An Act to authorise the South Hants Waterworks Company to raise additional capital; to confer further powers upon the company, and for other purposes.
Bank of Scotland Act 1920 (repealed)	10 & 11 Geo. 5. c. xxxi	2 July 1920
An Act to consolidate and amend the constitution of the Governor and Company of the Bank of Scotland; and to provide for the management of its affairs and for other purposes. (Repealed by HBOS Group Reorganisation Act 2006 (c. i))
Tees Valley Water Act 1920	10 & 11 Geo. 5. c. xxxii	2 July 1920
An Act to sanction and confirm the construction of waterworks by the Tees Valley Water Board; to authorise the board to construct additional waterworks; to make better provision with regard to their water undertaking, and for other purposes.
Mersey Railway Act 1920	10 & 11 Geo. 5. c. xxxiii	2 July 1920
An Act to amend the Mersey Railway Act, 1900. (Note: Mersey Railway Act 1900 (63 & 64 Vict. c. cxxxiv))
Wear Navigation and Sunderland Dock Act 1920 (repealed)	10 & 11 Geo. 5. c. xxxiv	2 July 1920
An Act to extend the period during which certain increased Maximum Rates Dues Tolls and Charges may be levied by the River Wear Commissioners. (Repealed by Wear Navigation and Sunderland Dock (Consolidation and Amendment) Act 1922 (12 & 13 Geo. 5. c. lxxxiv))
Seaham Harbour Dock Act 1920	10 & 11 Geo. 5. c. xxxv	2 July 1920
An Act to confer further powers on the Seaham Harbour Dock Company.
Tees Conservancy Act 1920	10 & 11 Geo. 5. c. xxxvi	2 July 1920
An Act for enabling the Tees Conservancy Commissioners further to improve the River and to reclaim further lands therefrom; to create and issue New Debenture Stock and to raise further moneys; and for other purposes.
Rochester, Chatham and Gillingham Gas Act 1920	10 & 11 Geo. 5. c. xxxvii	2 July 1920
An Act to confer further powers upon the Rochester, Chatham, and Gillingham Gas Company.
Tyneside Tramways and Tramroads Act 1920 (repealed)	10 & 11 Geo. 5. c. xxxviii	2 July 1920
An Act to confer further powers on the Tyneside Tramways and Tramroads Company. (Repealed by Tyne & Wear Act 1980 (c. xliii))
Belfast Water Act 1920	10 & 11 Geo. 5. c. xxxix	2 July 1920
An Act to confer further powers on the Belfast City and District Water Commissioners.
Glasgow Corporation Order Confirmation Act 1920	10 & 11 Geo. 5. c. xl	2 July 1920
An Act to confirm a Provisional Order under the Private Legislation Procedure (Scotland) Act, 1899, (Note: Private Legislation Procedure (Scotland) Act 1899 (62 & 63 Vict. c. 47)) relating to Glasgow Corporation.
	Glasgow Corporation Order 1920 Provisional Order to increase the Parks Libraries Municipal Buildings Public Health and Sewage Assessments in the City and Royal Burgh of Glasgow; to increase the amount the Corporation may borrow for Police and Tramway purposes; to make provision with respect to Ferries on the River Clyde; to amend certain provisions of the Glasgow Building Regulations Act, 1900; (Note: Glasgow Building Regulations Act 1900 (63 & 64 Vict. c. cl)) to extend the time for the compulsory purchase of Lands for and for the completion of the Tramways, Street Works and Bridges authorised by the Glasgow (Tramways, Bridges, &c.) Act, 1914; (Note: Glasgow (Tramways, Bridges, &c.) Act 1914 (4 & 5 Geo. 5. c. clxviii)) and for other purposes.	
Motherwell and Wishaw Burgh Order Confirmation Act 1920	10 & 11 Geo. 5. c. xli	2 July 1920
An Act to confirm a Provisional Order under the Private Legislation Procedure (Scotland) Act 1899 relating to Motherwell and Wishaw Burghs (Amalgamation and Extension).
	Motherwell and Wishaw Burgh Order 1920 Provisional Order to amalgamate the Burghs of Motherwell and Wishaw into one burgh; to extend the boundaries of that burgh; and for other purposes.	
Irvine Harbour Order Confirmation Act 1920	10 & 11 Geo. 5. c. xlii	2 July 1920
An Act to confirm a Provisional Order under the Private Legislation Procedure (Scotland) Act 1899 relating to Irvine Harbour.
	Irvine Harbour Order 1920 Provisional Order to incorporate the Irvine Harbour Company; to transfer to and vest in that Company the undertaking of the Irvine Harbour Trustees; and for other purposes.	
Dumbarton Burgh Gas Order Confirmation Act 1920	10 & 11 Geo. 5. c. xliii	2 July 1920
An Act to confirm a Provisional Order under the Private Legislation Procedure (Scotland) Act 1899 relating to Dumbarton Burgh Gas.
	Dumbarton Burgh Gas Order 1920 Provisional Order to authorise the Provost Magistrates and Councillors of the Burgh of Dumbarton to construct new Gasworks and to acquire Lands; to sell the lands now occupied by the existing Gasworks; to confer further powers in relation to their Gas undertaking; and for other purposes.	
Metropolitan Police Provisional Order Confirmation Act 1920 (repealed)	10 & 11 Geo. 5. c. xliv	2 July 1920
An Act to confirm a Provisional Order made by one of His Majesty's Principal Secretaries of State under the Metropolitan Police Act, 1886. (Note: Metropolitan Police Act 1886 (49 & 50 Vict. c. 22)) (Repealed by Statute Law (Repeals) Act 2008 (c. 12))
Ministry of Health Provisional Orders Confirmation (No. 1) Act 1920	10 & 11 Geo. 5. c. xlv	2 July 1920
An Act to confirm certain Provisional Orders of the Minister of Health relating to Birkenhead, Carlisle, Carnarvon, Llandudno Luton, Southampton, Stockton-on-Tees, and Weston-super-Mare.
	Birkenhead Order 1920	
	Carlisle Order 1920	
	Carnarvon Order 1920	
	Llandudno Order 1920	
	Southampton Order 1920	
	Stockton-on-Tees Order 1920	
	Weston-super-Mare Order 1920	
Ministry of Health Provisional Orders Confirmation (No. 2) Act 1920	10 & 11 Geo. 5. c. xlvi	2 July 1920
An Act to confirm certain Provisional Orders of the Ministry of Health relating to St. Helens, Spalding, Stockport, Tunbridge Wells, Westhoughton, Wimbledon, and the Middlesex Districts Joint Small-pox Hospital District.
	St. Helens Order 1920	
	Spalding Order 1920	
	Stockport Order 1920	
	Tunbridge Wells Order 1920	
	Westhoughton Order 1920	
	Wimbledon Order 1920	
	Middlesex Districts Joint Small-pox Hospital Order 1920	
Swansea Corporation Act 1920	10 & 11 Geo. 5. c. xlvii	4 August 1920
An Act to empower the Corporation of Swansea to construct street improvements and other works, and to run motor omnibuses; to consolidate the local rates leviable in the borough; and to make better provision for the health, local government, and finance of the borough; and for other purposes.
Wrexham District Tramways Act 1920	10 & 11 Geo. 5. c. xlviii	4 August 1920
An Act to increase the rates and charges which may be taken in respect of the tramways of the Wrexham and District Transport Company, Limited, and for other purposes.
Upper Mersey Navigation Act 1920	10 & 11 Geo. 5. c. xlix	4 August 1920
An Act to increase and alter the tolls, rates, and dues authorised to be levied by, and the borrowing powers of, the Upper Mersey Navigation Commissioners, and for other purposes.
Port of Portsmouth Floating Bridge Act 1920	10 & 11 Geo. 5. c. l	4 August 1920
An Act to extend the powers of the Company of Proprietors of the Port of Portsmouth Floating Bridge Bridge with regard to the provision and running of steam vessels; to increase the tolls authorised to be taken by them; to authorise them to raise additional Capital; and for other purposes.
Wood Green Urban District Council Act 1920	10 & 11 Geo. 5. c. li	4 August 1920
An Act to empower the Urban District Council of Wood Green to sell, exchange, and appropriate certain common or waste lands and to construct a new street and street improvements; to make further provision with regard to the improvement, health, local government, and finance of the district, the establishment of a fund for the granting of superannuation allowances to officers and servants, and for other purposes.
Newtownards Urban District Council Act 1920	10 & 11 Geo. 5. c. lii	4 August 1920
An Act to authorise the urban district council of Newtownards to borrow further money for their gas and water undertakings; to make further provision with respect to the supply of gas and water and for the improvement and local government of the district, and for other purposes.
Filey Urban District Council Act 1920	10 & 11 Geo. 5. c. liii	4 August 1920
An Act to confer upon the urban district council of Filey powers in relation to certain pleasure grounds known as the Crescent Gardens and South Crescent Gardens, and for other purposes.
Saint Annes-on-the-Sea Urban District Council Act 1920 (repealed)	10 & 11 Geo. 5. c. liv	4 August 1920
An Act to provide for the transfer to the Council Saint Annes-on-the-Sea Urban District Council of the undertaking of the Blackpool, Saint Annes, and Lytham Tramways Company, Limited, and to empower the Council to run tramways, and for other purposes. (Repealed by Post Office Act 1969 (c. 48))
Croydon Corporation Act 1920 (repealed)	10 & 11 Geo. 5. c. lv	4 August 1920
An Act to confer further powers upon the Mayor, Aldermen, and Burgesses of the County Borough of Croydon in regard to their water undertaking, and for other purposes. (Repealed by Croydon Corporation Act 1960 (8 & 9 Eliz. 2. c. xl))
Gelligaer Urban District Council Act 1920	10 & 11 Geo. 5. c. lvi	4 August 1920
An Act to empower the urban district council of Gelligaer to acquire lands and to construct street improvements; to confer further powers on the council in regard to their electricity undertaking; to authorise the council to provide and run omnibuses; to make further provision with regard to the improvement, health, local government, and finance of the district, and for other purposes.
Newport Corporation Act 1920	10 & 11 Geo. 5. c. lvii	4 August 1920
An Act to empower the Mayor, Aldermen, and Burgesses of the county borough of Newport to construct additional waterworks, and for other purpose.
Liverpool Corporation Waterworks Act 1920 (repealed)	10 & 11 Geo. 5. c. lviii	4 August 1920
An Act to empower the Lord Mayor, Aldermen, and Citizens of the City of Liverpool to construct an additional line of pipes to form part of the Vyrnwy Aqueduct, and for other purposes. (Repealed by County of Merseyside Act 1980 (c. x))
Folkestone Corporation Act 1920 (repealed)	10 & 11 Geo. 5. c. lix	4 August 1920
An Act to empower the Mayor, Aldermen, and Burgesses of the Borough of Folkestone to provide concert halls and entertainments; to make further provision for the improvement and good government of the borough; to provide for the increase of the number of the council and of the wards of the borough, the consolidation of rates, and other matters. (Repealed by County of Kent Act 1981 (c. xviii))
Redcar Urban District Council Gas Act 1920	10 & 11 Geo. 5. c. lx	4 August 1920
An Act to transfer and vest in the Council of the Urban District of Redcar the undertaking of the Redcar, Coatham, Marske, and Saltburn Gas Company, and to authorise the council to supply gas, and for other purposes.
Liverpool Copper Wharf Company (Delivery Warrants) Act 1920	10 & 11 Geo. 5. c. lxi	4 August 1920
An Act to enable the Liverpool Copper Wharf Company, Limited, to issue transferable certificates and warrants for the delivery of goods, and for other purposes.
Londonderry Bridge Act 1920 (repealed)	10 & 11 Geo. 5. c. lxii	4 August 1920
An Act to increase the tolls, rates, and charges authorised by the Londonderry Bridge Acts, 1859 (Note: Londonderry Bridge Act 1859 (22 Vict. c. vii)) and 1877. (Note: Londonderry Bridge Act 1877 (40 & 41 Vict. c. cxcvi)) (Repealed by Londonderry Corporation Act (Northern Ireland) 1924 (14 & 15 Geo. 5. c. v (NI)))
Bootle Corporation Act 1920 (repealed)	10 & 11 Geo. 5. c. lxiii	4 August 1920
An Act to provide for the consolidation of the rates of the borough of Bootle; to empower the Mayor, Aldermen, and Burgesses of the said borough to make further provision for the health, local government, and improvement of the borough and with regard to financial matters, and for other purposes. (Repealed by County of Merseyside Act 1980 (c. x))
Eastbourne Waterworks Act 1920	10 & 11 Geo. 5. c. lxiv	4 August 1920
An Act for conferring further powers on the Eastbourne Waterworks Company, and for other purposes.
Bridlington Corporation Act 1920 (repealed)	10 & 11 Geo. 5. c. lxv	4 August 1920
An Act to empower the Mayor, Aldermen, and Burgesses of the Borough of Bridlington to construct new streets and street improvements; to extend the Prince's Parade; to provide and run omnibuses, and for other purposes. (Repealed by Humberside Act 1982 (c. iii))
Nottingham Corporation Act 1920	10 & 11 Geo. 5. c. lxvi	4 August 1920
An Act to authorise the Mayor, Aldermen, and Citizens of the city of Nottingham and county of the same city to construct tramways and street improvements; to run motor omnibuses on additional routes and for other purposes.
Pontypridd Urban District Council Act 1920	10 & 11 Geo. 5. c. lxvii	4 August 1920
An Act to empower the Pontypridd Urban District Council to construct street works, tramways, and a tramroad; to confer further powers upon them with regard to rivers and streams; to make further provision in regard to the tramways and gas undertakings of the council, and to empower them to establish a depôt for the sale of milk, and for other purposes.
Portsmouth Corporation Act 1920	10 & 11 Geo. 5. c. lxviii	4 August 1920
An Act to extend the boundaries of the Borough of Portsmouth; to authorise the Corporation of the borough to construct new tramways and to confer upon them further powers with respect to their tramway and electricity undertakings; to consolidate the local rates leviable in the borough; to make better provisions for the health, local government, and finance of the borough, and for other purposes.
Rhondda Urban District Council Act 1920 (repealed)	10 & 11 Geo. 5. c. lxix	4 August 1920
An Act to make further provision with respect to the tramway undertaking of the Rhondda Urban District Council; to authorise the council to construct additional waterworks, and for other purposes. (Repealed by Rhondda Corporation Act 1973 (c. xxiii))
Wolverhampton Corporation Act 1920 (repealed)	10 & 11 Geo. 5. c. lxx	4 August 1920
An Act to empower the Mayor, Aldermen, and Burgesses of the Borough of Wolverhampton to construct street improvements and to provide and work omnibuses; to make further provision with regard to the tramway and water undertakings of the Corporation, and for other purposes. (Repealed by Wolverhampton Corporation Act 1969 (c. lx))
South Metropolitan Gas Act 1920	10 & 11 Geo. 5. c. lxxi	4 August 1920
An Act to enable the South Metropolitan Gas Company to sell gas on a heat unit basis; to make new provision as to charges for the gas and application of the profits of the company; to extend the powers of the company to amalgamate with or purchase other undertakings, and for other purposes.
Mersey Docks and Harbour Board Act 1920	10 & 11 Geo. 5. c. lxxii	4 August 1920
An Act to authorise the Mersey Docks and Harbour Board to construct further works, and for other purposes.
Huddersfield Corporation (Lands) Act 1920 (repealed)	10 & 11 Geo. 5. c. lxxiii	4 August 1920
An Act to enable the Mayor, Aldermen, and Burgesses of the Borough of Huddersfield to purchase the Ramsden Estate, in the borough and adjoining parish of Honley, and to enlarge the powers of the Mayor, Aldermen, and Burgesses in relation to the acquisition of lands and buildings, and for other purposes. (Repealed by West Yorkshire Act 1980 (c. xiv))
Dearne Valley Water Act 1920	10 & 11 Geo. 5. c. lxxiv	4 August 1920
An Act to constitute a water board for a portion of the Dearne Valley, in the West Riding of Yorkshire, with power to acquire water undertakings and supply water, and for other purposes.
Londonderry Port and Harbour Act 1920	10 & 11 Geo. 5. c. lxxv	4 August 1920
An Act to confer further powers upon the Londonderry Port and Harbour Commissioners, and for other purposes.
Halifax Corporation Act 1920	10 & 11 Geo. 5. c. lxxvi	4 August 1920
An Act to empower the Corporation of Halifax to construct additional Tramways Street Widenings and Improvements to supply Electricity in certain areas outside the Borough and to confer further powers with respect to their Electricity and Gas Undertakings and for the consolidation of the local rates, and for other purposes.
Leigh Corporation Act 1920	10 & 11 Geo. 5. c. lxxvii	4 August 1920
An Act to authorise the Mayor, Aldermen, and Burgesses of the Borough of Leigh to provide and run omnibuses within and beyond the borough of Leigh, and for other purposes.
Sutton Coldfield Corporation Act 1920 (repealed)	10 & 11 Geo. 5. c. lxxviii	4 August 1920
An Act to confer further powers on the Mayor, Aldermen, and Burgesses of the Borough of Sutton Coldfield. (Repealed by West Midlands County Council Act 1980 (c. xi))
Tredegar Urban District Council Act 1920	10 & 11 Geo. 5. c. lxxix	4 August 1920
An Act to empower the Urban District Council of Tredegar to construct additional waterworks; to make further provision with regard to the supply of water, gas, and electricity, and for other purposes.
Weardale and Consett Water Act 1920	10 & 11 Geo. 5. c. lxxx	4 August 1920
An Act to amend the Weardale and Consett Water Act, 1915, (Note: Weardale and Consett Water Act 1915 (5 & 6 Geo. 5. c. lxxii)) and for other purposes.
Great Northern Railway Act 1920	10 & 11 Geo. 5. c. lxxxi	4 August 1920
An Act to authorise the Great Northern Railway Company to construct a new railway and widenings of railways and other works, and to acquire lands and to confer further powers upon that company; to authorise the Great Northern and Great Eastern Joint Committee to construct certain works; to authorise the Midland and Great Northern Railways Joint Committee to acquire certain lands, and for other purposes.
Central London and Metropolitan District Railways (Works) Act 1920	10 & 11 Geo. 5. c. lxxxii	4 August 1920
An Act to empower the Central London Railway Company to construct new railways and the Metropolitan District and Metropolitan Railway Companies to enlarge their Aldgate East Station; to confer further powers on those companies, and for other purposes.
Blackpool Improvement Act 1920	10 & 11 Geo. 5. c. lxxxiii	4 August 1920
An Act to alter the boundaries of the Borough of Blackpool; to empower the Mayor, Aldermen, and Burgesses of that borough to construct tramroads, a tramway, a promenade, street improvements, and other works, and for other purposes.
Hastings Tramways Act 1920 (repealed)	10 & 11 Geo. 5. c. lxxxiv	4 August 1920
An Act to authorise the Hastings Tramways Company to work a tramway authorised by the Hastings Tramways (Extensions) Act, 1903, (Note: Hastings Tramways (Extensions) Act 1903 (3 Edw. 7. c. xcviii)) by electrical power on the overhead system; and to construct the necessary works for that purpose. (Repealed by Hastings Tramways Act 1957 (5 & 6 Eliz. 2. c. xxxvi))
Dover Harbour Act 1920 (repealed)	10 & 11 Geo. 5. c. lxxxv	4 August 1920
An Act to authorise the construction of certain new works for improving the harbour of Dover; the raising of further moneys by the Dover Harbour Board, and for other purposes. (Repealed by Dover Harbour Consolidation Act 1954 (2 & 3 Eliz. 2. c. iv))
Pontypridd Stipendiary Magistrate Act 1920	10 & 11 Geo. 5. c. lxxxvi	4 August 1920
An Act to repeal and re-enact, with Amendments, the Pontypridd Stipendiary Magistrates Act, 1872. (Note: Pontypridd Stipendiary Magistrate's Act 1872 (35 & 36 Vict. c. xiv))
Edinburgh Boundaries Extension and Tramways Act 1920	10 & 11 Geo. 5. c. lxxxvii	4 August 1920
An Act to extend the boundaries of the city and royal burgh of Edinburgh and the county of the city of Edinburgh; to extend the city parish of Edinburgh; to transfer to and vest in the Corporation of the extended city the undertakings of the Edinburgh and District Water Trustees, the Edinburgh and Leith Corporations Gas Commissioners, and the Water of Leith Purification and Sewerage Commissioners; to extend the limits of compulsory water supply and the limits of gas supply; to construct tramways and works; to provide and work motor omnibuses within the extended city; to acquire lands; to authorise the Corporation to make byelaws as to aviation; to extend the time for the purchase of lands and completion of authorised works; to borrow money; to lend money to the Commissioners for the Harbour and Docks of Leith; to amend and extend the Edinburgh municipal and police and other Acts, and for other purposes.
Coventry Corporation Act 1920	10 & 11 Geo. 5. c. lxxxviii	4 August 1920
An Act to empower the Mayor, Aldermen, and Citizens of the City of Coventry to construct street improvement and additional tramways; to extend their powers for the running of motor omnibuses; to make further provision with regard to the tramway, gas, electricity and water undertakings of the Corporation, and with regard to the health, local government and improvement of the city; to establish a fund for granting superannuation allowances to officers and servants; to provide for the consolidation of rates, and for other purposes.
London County Council (General Powers) Act 1920	10 & 11 Geo. 5. c. lxxxix	4 August 1920
An Act to make provision with regard to fire inquests, drainage of premises, dwelling-houses on low-lying lands, establishments for massage or special treatment, and employment agencies, and to confer powers upon the London County Council, the Corporation of the City of London, and the metropolitan borough councils, and for other purposes.
Lowestoft Corporation Act 1920	10 & 11 Geo. 5. c. xc	4 August 1920
An Act to authorise the Mayor, Aldermen, and Burgesses, of the Borough of Lowestoft to provide and work trolley vehicles and motor omnibuses; to make further provision with regard to the supply of electricity, with regard to the health, local government, and improvement of the borough, the consolidation of the rates in the borough, and for other purposes.
Newcastle-upon-Tyne Corporation Act 1920	10 & 11 Geo. 5. c. xci	4 August 1920
An Act to enable the Lord Mayor, Aldermen, and Citizens of the City and County of Newcastle-upon-Tyne to construct and work additional tramways and tramroads; to confer upon them further powers with reference to the running of motor omnibuses, and for other purposes.
Sheffield Corporation Act 1920 (repealed)	10 & 11 Geo. 5. c. xcii	4 August 1920
An Act to empower the Corporation of the City of Sheffield to acquire the undertaking of the Sheffield Gas Company and to supply gas; to execute certain street improvements and construct additional tramways; to make better provision for the health and local government of the city; to consolidate the local rates leviable in the city, and for other purposes. (Repealed by Statute Law (Repeals) Act 1989 (c. 43))
Southampton Corporation Act 1920	10 & 11 Geo. 5. c. xciii	4 August 1920
An Act to confer further powers upon the Mayor, Aldermen, and Burgesses of the Borough of Southampton for the construction of tramways and the running of omnibuses and to empower them to acquire lands for a hospital, and for other purposes.
Brighton and Hove Gas Act 1920	10 & 11 Geo. 5. c. xciv	4 August 1920
An Act to authorise the Brighton and Hove General Gas Company to raise additional capital, to confer further powers upon the Company, and for other purposes.
Norwich Corporation Act 1920	10 & 11 Geo. 5. c. xcv	4 August 1920
An Act to make provision for the transfer of the undertaking of the City of Norwich Waterworks Company to the Mayor, Aldermen, and Citizens of the City of Norwich; to empower the said Mayor, Aldermen, and Citizens to construct a new bridge and other works, and for other purposes.
Durham County Water Board Act 1920	10 & 11 Geo. 5. c. xcvi	4 August 1920
An Act to constitute a Water Board for the county of Durham; to empower the Board to acquire the undertaking of the Weardale and Consett Water Company and to supply water within the limits of supply of that company, and for other purposes.
Manchester Corporation Act 1920	10 & 11 Geo. 5. c. xcvii	4 August 1920
An Act to confer further powers upon the Lord Mayor, Aldermen, and Citizens of the city of Manchester with reference to the extension of their town hall and the construction of street improvements, tramways, and sewerage and other works; to make further provision for the granting of superannuation allowances to their officers and servants, and for other purposes.
South Suburban Gas Act 1920 (repealed)	10 & 11 Geo. 5. c. xcviii	4 August 1920
An Act to authorise the South Suburban Gas Company to manufacture and store gas and residual products on certain lands and to raise additional capital; to alter the basis of charging by that company for gas supplied by them; to amend the existing enactments with respect to the relation between price and dividend in the case of that company, and for other purposes. (Repealed by South Suburban Gas Act 1928 (18 & 19 Geo. 5. c. lxxx))
Derwent Valley, Calver and Bakewell Railway Act 1920	10 & 11 Geo. 5. c. xcix	4 August 1920
An Calver, Act for incorporating the Derwent Valley, Calver, and Bakewell Railway Company and authorising them to construct railways in the county of Derby, and for other purposes.
Invergordon Harbour (Transfer) Act 1920	10 & 11 Geo. 5. c. c	4 August 1920
An Act to confirm an agreement entered into by the Admiralty for the acquisition of a harbour at Invergordon, and certain properties, rights, and powers in connection therewith.
Local Government Board (Ireland) Provisional Orders Confirmation (No. 2) Act 1920	10 & 11 Geo. 5. c. ci	4 August 1920
An Act to confirm certain Provisional Orders of the Local Government Board for Ireland relating to the City of Dublin the Urban Districts of Ballymena and Larne and the Rural District of Tralee.
	Dublin (Chancery Street) Order 1920 Provisional Order to enable the Corporation of Dublin to put in force the Compulsory Clauses of the Lands Clauses Acts.	
	Larne Order 1920 Provisional Order to enable the Council of the Urban District of Larne to put in force the Compulsory Clauses of the Lands Clauses Acts.	
	Ratass Burial Ground Order 1920 Provisional Order to enable the Council of the Rural District of Tralee to put in force the Compulsory Clauses of the Lands Clauses Acts.	
	Ballymena Gas Order 1920 Provisional Order under the Gas and Water Works Facilities Act 1870 (Note: Gas and Water Works Facilities Act 1870 (33 & 34 Vict. c. 70)) the Gas and Water Works Facilities Act 1870 Amendment Act 1873 (Note: Gas and Water Works Facilities Act 1870 Amendment Act 1873 (36 & 37 Vict. c. 89)) and the Public Health (Ireland) Act 1878. (Note: Public Health (Ireland) Act 1878 (41 & 42 Vict. c. 52))	
Provisional Order (Marriages) Confirmation Act 1920 (repealed)	10 & 11 Geo. 5. c. cii	4 August 1920
An Act to confirm a Provisional Order made by one of His Majesty's Principal Secretaries of State under the Provisional Order (Marriages) Act 1905. (Note: Provisional Order (Marriages) Act 1905 (5 Edw. 7. c. 23)) (Repealed by Statute Law (Repeals) Act 1977 (c. 18))
	St. Margaret Halstead Order.	
Pilotage Orders Confirmation (No. 1) Act 1920 (repealed)	10 & 11 Geo. 5. c. ciii	4 August 1920
An Act to confirm certain Pilotage Orders made by the Board of Trade under the Pilotage Act 1913 (Note: Pilotage Act 1913 (2 & 3 Geo. 5. c. 31)) relating to the Pilotage Districts of Liverpool and Manchester. (Repealed by Statute Law (Repeals) Act 1995 (c. 44))
	Liverpool Pilotage Order 1920 Liverpool Pilotage Order.	
	Manchester Pilotage Order 1920 Manchester Pilotage Order.	
Pilotage Orders Confirmation (No. 2) Act 1920 (repealed)	10 & 11 Geo. 5. c. civ	4 August 1920
An Act to confirm certain Pilotage Orders made by the Board of Trade under the Pilotage Act 1913 relating to the Pilotage Districts of Cork Drogheda Dundalk Galway and Newry and Carlingford. (Repealed by Statute Law (Repeals) Act 1995 (c. 44))
	Cork Pilotage Order 1920 Cork Pilotage Order.	
	Drogheda Pilotage Order 1920 Drogheda Pilotage Order.	
	Dundalk Pilotage Order 1920 Dundalk Pilotage Order.	
	Galway Pilotage Order 1920 Galway Pilotage Order.	
	Newry and Carlingford Pilotage Order 1920 Newry and Carlingford Pilotage Order.	
Gas Orders Confirmation Act 1920	10 & 11 Geo. 5. c. cv	4 August 1920
An Act to confirm certain Provisional Orders made by the Board of Trade under the Gas and Water Works Facilities Act 1870 relating to Braintree and Bocking Gas Great Marlow Gas Ilford Gas Stone Gas Taunton Gas and Watford Gas.
	Braintree and Bocking Gas Order 1920 Order empowering the Braintree and Bocking Gas Company Limited to construct additional gasworks to raise additional capital and for other purposes in connection with their undertaking.	
	Great Marlow Gas Order 1920 Order empowering the Great Marlow Gas Company Limited to raise additional capital and for other purposes.	
	Ilford Gas Order 1920 Order empowering the Ilford Gas Company to raise additional capital to purchase additional lands to construct additional gasworks and for other purposes.	
	Stone Gas Order 1920 Order extending the limits for the supply of gas by the Stone Gas and Electricity Company Limited.	
	Taunton Gas Order 1920 Order to empower the Taunton Gas Light and Coke Company to raise additional capital and for other purposes.	
	Watford Gas Order 1920 Order authorising the Watford Gas and Coke Company to construct and maintain additional gasworks and for other purposes.	
Gas and Water Orders Confirmation Act 1920	10 & 11 Geo. 5. c. cvi	4 August 1920
An Act to confirm certain Provisional Orders made by the Board of Trade under the Gas and Water Works Facilities Act 1870 relating to Great Yarmouth Gas Mablethorpe and Sutton Gas Bristol Water East Kent District Water Mid Kent Water and South Kent Water.
	Great Yarmouth Gas Order 1920 Order authorising the Great Yarmouth Gas Company to raise additional capital.	
	Mablethorpe and Sutton Gas Order 1920 Order empowering the Mablethorpe and Sutton Gas Company Limited to raise additional capital and for other purposes.	
	Bristol Waterworks Order 1920 Order authorising the Bristol Waterworks Company to construct new waterworks and conferring further powers on the Company.	
	East Kent District Water Order 1920 Order conferring further powers upon the East Kent District Water Company.	
	Mid Kent Water Order 1920 Order conferring further powers upon the Mid Kent Water Company.	
	South Kent Water Order 1920 Order conferring further powers upon the South Kent Water Company.	
Airdrie and Coatbridge Tramways Order Confirmation Act 1920 (repealed)	10 & 11 Geo. 5. c. cvii	4 August 1920
An Act to confirm a Provisional Order under the Private Legislation Procedure (Scotland) Act 1899 relating to Airdrie and Coatbridge Tramways. (Repealed by Glasgow (Tramways, &c.) Order Confirmation Act 1922 (13 Geo. 5 Sess. 2. c. ii))
	Airdrie and Coatbridge Tramways Order 1920 Provisional Order to amend the Airdrie and Coatbridge Tramways Act 1900 (Note: Airdrie and Coatbridge Tramways Act 1900 (63 & 64 Vict. c. xcvii)) and the Coatbridge Tramways Order 1901.	
Dundee Corporation Order Confirmation Act 1920 (repealed)	10 & 11 Geo. 5. c. cviii	4 August 1920
An Act to confirm a Provisional Order under the Private Legislation Procedure (Scotland) Act 1899 relating to Dundee Corporation. (Repealed by Dundee Corporation (Consolidated Powers) Order Confirmation Act 1957 (6 & 7 Eliz. 2. c. iv))
	Dundee Corporation Order 1920	
Dunfermline and District Tramways Order Confirmation Act 1920	10 & 11 Geo. 5. c. cix	4 August 1920
An Act to confirm a Provisional Order under the Private Legislation Procedure (Scotland) Act 1899 relating to Dunfermline and District Tramways.
	Dunfermline and District Tramways Order 1920 Provisional Order to revive the powers and extend the time for the acquisition of certain lands and to extend the time for the completion of certain tramways and works authorised by the Dunfermline and District Tramways (Extensions) Orders 1910 and 1915 and the Wemyss Tramways (Extensions) Order 1910 and for other purposes.	
Ministry of Health Provisional Orders Confirmation (No. 3) Act 1920	10 & 11 Geo. 5. c. cx	4 August 1920
An Act to confirm certain Provisional Orders of the Minister of Health relating to Leeds Torquay Wallasey and the Saint Austell Joint Hospital District.
	Leeds Order 1920 Provisional Order for altering the Leeds Corporation (Consolidation) Act 1905. (Note: Leeds Corporation (Consolidation) Act 1905 (5 Edw. 7. c. i))	
	Torquay Order 1920 Provisional Order for altering the Torquay Corporation Water Act 1903. (Note: Torquay Corporation Water Act 1903 (3 Edw. 7. c. cvi))	
	Wallasey Order 1920 Provisional Order for altering the Wallasey Improvement Act 1867 (Note: Wallasey Improvement Act 1867 (30 & 31 Vict. c. cxxxii)) and the Local Government Board's Provisional Orders Confirmation (No. 1) Act 1918. (Note: Local Government Board's Provisional Orders Confirmation (No. 1) Act 1918 (8 & 9 Geo. 5. c. i))	
	Saint Austell Joint Hospital Order 1920 Provisional Order for forming a United District under Section 279 of the Public Health Act 1875. (Note: Public Health Act 1875 (38 & 39 Vict. c. 55))	
Ministry of Health Provisional Orders Confirmation (No. 4) Act 1920	10 & 11 Geo. 5. c. cxi	4 August 1920
An Act to confirm certain Provisional Orders of the Minister of Health relating to Chiswick Dartford Denton Orsett (Rural) Rochdale Rotherham (Rural) Southport the Thurrock Grays and Tilbury Joint Sewerage District and the County Palatine of Lancaster.
	Chiswick Order 1920 Provisional Order to enable the Urban District Council Chiswick to put in force the Compulsory Clauses of the Lands Clauses Acts.	
	Dartford Order 1920 Provisional Order to enable the Urban District Council of Dartford to put in force the Compulsory Clauses of the Lands Clauses Acts.	
	Denton Order 1920 Provisional Order to enable the Urban District Council of Denton to put in force the Compulsory Clauses of the Lands Clauses Acts.	
	Orsett Rural Order 1920 Provisional Order to enable the Rural District Council of Orsett to put in force the Compulsory Clauses of the Lands Clauses Acts.	
	Rochdale Order 1920 Provisional Order to enable the Urban Sanitary Authority for the Borough of Rochdale to put in force the Compulsory Clauses of the Lands Clauses Acts.	
	Rotherham Rural Order 1920 Provisional Order to enable the Rural District Council of Rotherham to put in force the Compulsory Clauses of the Lands Clauses Acts.	
	Southport Order 1920 Provisional Order to enable the Urban Sanitary Authority for the County Borough of Southport to put in force the Compulsory Clauses of the Lands Clauses Acts.	
	Thurrock, Grays and Tilbury Order 1920 Provisional Order to enable the Thurrock Grays and Tilbury Joint Sewerage Board to put in force the Compulsory Clauses of the Lands Clauses Acts.	
	County of Lancaster Order 1920 Provisional Order to enable the County Council of the County Palatine of Lancaster to put in force the Compulsory Clauses of the Lands Clauses Acts.	
Ministry of Health Provisional Orders Confirmation (No. 5) Act 1920	10 & 11 Geo. 5. c. cxii	4 August 1920
An Act to confirm certain Provisional Orders of the Minister of Health relating to Bognor Bradford Keighley Southend-on-Sea Tynemouth and the Rochester and Chatham Joint Sewerage District.
	Bognor Order 1920 Provisional Order to enable the Urban District Council of Bognor to put in force the Compulsory Clauses of the Lands Clauses Acts.	
	Bradford Order (No. 1) 1920 Provisional Order to enable the Urban Sanitary Authority for the City of Bradford to put in force the Compulsory Clauses of the Lands Clauses Acts.	
	Keighley Order 1920 Provisional Order to enable the Urban District Council for the Borough of Keighley to put in force the Compulsory Clauses of the Lands Clauses Acts.	
	Southend-on-Sea Order 1920 Provisional Order to enable the Urban Sanitary Authority for the Borough of Southend-on-Sea to put in force the Compulsory Clauses of the Lands Clauses Acts.	
	Tynemouth Order 1920 Provisional Order to enable the Urban Sanitary Authority for the Borough of Tynemouth to put in force the Compulsory Clauses of the Lands Clauses Acts.	
	Rochester and Chatham Order 1920 Provisional Order to enable the Rochester and Chatham Joint Rochester and Chatham Sewerage Board to put in force the Compulsory Clauses of the Lands Clauses Acts.	
Ministry of Health Provisional Orders Confirmation (No. 6) Act 1920	10 & 11 Geo. 5. c. cxiii	4 August 1920
An Act to confirm certain Provisional Orders of the Minister of Health relating to Bradford Brighton Buxton Fulwood Gravesend Leek Manchester Neath Paignton and the Whitchurch and District Joint Hospital District.
	Bradford Order (No. 2) 1920 Provisional Order for partially repealing and altering the Bradford Corporation Act 1903 (Note: Bradford Corporation Act 1903 (3 Edw. 7. c. ccxxxiii)) the Bradford Corporation Act 1910 (Note: Bradford Corporation Act 1910 (10 Edw. 7 & 1 Geo. 5. c. cxvii)) the Bradford Corporation Act 1913 (Note: Bradford Corporation Act 1913 (3 & 4 Geo. 5. c. xcvi)) and a Confirming Act. (Note: Local Government Board's Provisional Orders Confirmation (No. 1) Act 1916 (6 & 7 Geo. 5. c. xxvii))	
	Brighton Order 1920 Provisional Order for partially repealing altering and amending certain Local Acts and Confirming Acts.	
	Buxton Order 1920 Provisional Order for altering the Buxton Urban District Council Water Act 1902 (Note: Buxton Urban District Council Water Act 1902 (2 Edw. 7. c. cxxv)) and the Buxton Urban District Council Act 1904. (Note: Buxton Urban District Council Act 1904 (4 Edw. 7. c. ccxxiv))	
	Fulwood Order 1920 Provisional Order for altering the Fulwood and Whittingham Water Act 1882 (Note: Fulwood and Whittingham Water Act 1882 (45 & 46 Vict. c. xi)) the Fulwood Local Board Act 1885 (Note: Fulwood Local Board Act 1885 (48 & 49 Vict. c. xxxv)) and the Fulwood Local Board (Water) Act 1894. (Note: Fulwood Local Board (Water) Act 1894 (57 & 58 Vict. c. lviii))	
	Gravesend Order 1920 Provisional Order for partially repealing and altering the Gravesend Improvement Act 1856 and the Local Government Board's Provisional Orders Confirmation Act 1874 (No. 3). (Note: Local Government Board's Provisional Orders Confirmation Act (No. 3) 1874 (37 & 38 Vict. c. lxxxix))	
	Leek Order 1920 Provisional Order for partially repealing altering and amending the Leek Improvement Act 1855 (Note: Leek Improvement Act 1855 (18 & 19 Vict. c. cxxxii)) and the Local Government Board's Provisional Orders Confirmation (Abergavenny Union &c.) Act 1878. (Note: Local Government Board's Provisional Orders Confirmation (Abergavenny Union, &c.) Act 1878 (41 & 42 Vict. c. clxiv))	
	Manchester Order 1920 Provisional Order for altering the Manchester Corporation Waterworks and Improvement Act 1875 (Note: Manchester Corporation Waterworks and Improvement Act 1875) the Manchester Corporation Act 1911 (Note: Manchester Corporation Act 1911 (1 & 2 Geo. 5. c. cviii)) and certain Confirming Acts.	
	Neath Order 1920 Provisional Order for altering the Neath Corporation Gas Act 1874 (Note: Neath Corporation Gas Act 1874 (37 & 38 Vict. c. c)) and the Local Government Board's Provisional Orders Confirmation (No. 4) Act 1893. (Note: Local Government Board's Provisional Orders Confirmation (No. 4) Act 1893 (56 & 57 Vict. c. cxv))	
	Paignton Order 1920 Provisional Order for altering the Paignton Urban District Council Act 1911. (Note: Paignton Urban District Council Act 1911 (1 & 2 Geo. 5. c. liv))	
	Whitchurch and District Joint Hospital Order 1920 Provisional Order for partially repealing a Confirming Act. (Note: Local Government Board's Provisional Orders Confirmation (No. 3) Act 1904 (4 Edw. 7. c. lxiv))	
Ministry of Health Provisional Orders Confirmation (No. 7) Act 1920	10 & 11 Geo. 5. c. cxiv	4 August 1920
An Act to confirm certain Provisional Orders of the Minister of Health relating to Birkenhead Derby Dunheved otherwise Launceston Great Yarmouth Wakefield and Widnes.
	Birkenhead (Ferries) Order 1920 Provisional Order for altering the Birkenhead Corporation Act 1881 (Note: Birkenhead Corporation Act 1881 (44 & 45 Vict. c. cliii)) the Birkenhead Corporation Act 1897 (Note: Birkenhead Corporation Act 1897 (60 & 61 Vict. c. xcix)) the Birkenhead Corporation (Ferries) Act 1897 (Note: Birkenhead Corporation (Ferries) Act 1897 (60 & 61 Vict. c. c)) and the Birkenhead Corporation Act 1914. (Note: Birkenhead Corporation Act 1914 (4 & 5 Geo. 5. c. lxxxvi))	
	Derby Order 1920 Provisional Order for partially repealing and altering the Derby Corporation Act 1901. (Note: Derby Corporation Act 1901 (1 Edw. 7. c. cclxvii))	
	Great Yarmouth Order 1920 Provisional Order for altering the Great Yarmouth Corporation Act 1904. (Note: Great Yarmouth Corporation Act 1904 (4 Edw. 7. c. ccviii))	
	Wakefield Order 1920 Provisional Order for partially repealing altering amending the Wakefield Corporation Waterworks Act 1880 (Note: Wakefield Corporation Waterworks Act 1880 (43 & 44 Vict. c. lvii)) the Wakefield Corporation Act 1889 (Note: Wakefield Corporation Act 1889 (52 & 53 Vict. c. lxviii)) and the Wakefield Corporation Act 1916. (Note: Wakefield Corporation Act 1916 (6 & 7 Geo. 5. c. xx))	
	Widnes Order 1920 Provisional Order for partially repealing and altering the Widnes Corporation Act 1908. (Note: Widnes Corporation Act 1908 (8 Edw. 7. c. lxxxvi))	
	Launceston Order 1920 Provisional Order for repealing the Local Act 3 Vict. Cap LXXV. (Note: Launceston Markets Act 1840 (3 & 4 Vict. c. lxxv)) and altering the Local Government Board's Provisional Orders Confirmation (No. 14) Act 1889. (Note: Local Government Board's Provisional Orders Confirmation (No. 14) Act 1889 (52 & 53 Vict. c. clxxii))	
Ministry of Health Provisional Order Confirmation (Gas) Act 1920	10 & 11 Geo. 5. c. cxv	4 August 1920
An Act to confirm a Provisional Order of the Minister of Health relating to Wallingford.
	Wallingford Gas Order 1920 Provisional Order under the Gas and Water Works Facilities Act 1870 and the Gas and Water Works Facilities Act 1870 Amendment Act 1873.	
Ministry of Health Provisional Order Confirmation (Southampton Extension) Act 1920	10 & 11 Geo. 5. c. cxvi	4 August 1920
An Act to confirm a Provisional Order of the Minister of Health relating to Southampton.
	Southampton (Extension) Order 1920 Provisional Order made in pursuance of the Local Government Act 1888 (Note: Local Government Act 1888 (51 & 52 Vict. c. 41)) for extending a County Borough.	
Ministry of Health Provisional Order Confirmation (Lincoln Extension) Act 1920 (repealed)	10 & 11 Geo. 5. c. cxvii	4 August 1920
An Act to confirm a Provisional Order of the Minister of Health relating to Lincoln. (Repealed by Lincoln City Council Act 1985 (c. xxxviii))
	Lincoln (Extension) Order 1920 Provisional Order made in pursuance of the Local Government Act 1888 for extending a County Borough.	
Ministry of Health Provisional Order Confirmation (Hertford Extension) Act 1920	10 & 11 Geo. 5. c. cxviii	4 August 1920
An Act to confirm a Provisional Order of the Minister of Health relating to Hertford.
	Hertford (Extension) Order 1920 Provisional Order made in pursuance of the Local Government Act 1888 for extending a Borough.	
Tramways Orders Confirmation Act 1920	10 & 11 Geo. 5. c. cxix	4 August 1920
An Act to confirm certain Provisional Orders made by the Minister of Transport under the Tramways Act 1870 (Note: Tramways Act 1870 (33 & 34 Vict. c. 78)) relating to Gravesend Rosherville and Northfleet Tramways (Amendment) and Warrington Corporation Tramways (Extension).
	Gravesend, Rosherville and Northfleet Tramways (Amendment) Order 1920 Order authorising the Gravesend and Northfleet Electric Tramways Limited to increase the tolls and charges to be demanded and taken on the Tramways in the County of Kent in the Borough of Gravesend in the Urban District of Northfleet in the Rural District of Dartford and in the Parish of Swanscombe authorised by the Gravesend Rosherville and Northfleet Tramways Orders 1881 1884 and 1899.	
	Warrington Corporation Tramways (Extension) Order 1920 Order authorising the Mayor Aldermen and Burgesses of the Borough of Warrington to construct additional Tramways in the said borough and for other purposes.	
Pier and Harbour Orders Confirmation (No. 1) Act 1920	10 & 11 Geo. 5. c. cxx	4 August 1920
An Act to confirm certain Provisional Orders made by the Minister of Transport under the General Pier and Harbour Act 1861 (Note: General Pier and Harbour Act 1861 (24 & 25 Vict. c. 45)) relating to Harwich Llanelly Newlyn Padstow and Penryn.
	Harwich Harbour Order 1920 Order to increase the maximum tolls rates and duties leviable by the Harwich Harbour Conservancy Board.	
	Llanelly Harbour Order 1920 Order to increase the tolls dues rates rents fees and charges leviable by the Llanelly Harbour Trust.	
	Newlyn Pier and Harbour Order 1920 Order for increasing the rates of the Newlyn Pier and Harbour Commissioners.	
	Padstow Harbour Order 1920 Order to revive the powers for the construction and to extend the time for the completion of the works authorised by the Padstow Harbour Order 1913 to increase the tolls rates dues and charges leviable by the Padstow Harbour Commissioners and for other purposes.	
	Penryn Harbour Order 1920 Order to amend the Orders relating to the Penryn Harbour in regard to the levying of rates and for conferring powers upon the Mayor Aldermen and Burgesses of the Borough of Penryn in the County of Cornwall to levy increased rates in relation to that Harbour.	
Pier and Harbour Orders Confirmation (No. 2) Act 1920	10 & 11 Geo. 5. c. cxxi	4 August 1920
An Act to confirm certain Provisional Orders made by the Minister of Transport under the General Pier and Harbour Act 1861 relating to Blackpool Deal Eyemouth and Truro.
	Blackpool Pier Order 1920 Order for varying certain rates chargeable in respect of the use of Blackpool Pier and for other purpose.	
	Blackpool (South) Pier Order 1920 Order for varying certain rates chargeable in respect of the use of Blackpool (South) Pier.	
	Deal Pier Order 1920 Order for the transfer of the Deal Promenade Pier from the Deal Promenade Pier Company Limited to the Deal Corporation for conferring powers on the Corporation with reference to the holding maintenance management and improvement of the said Pier and to authorise the Corporation to borrow money and for other purposes.	
	Eyemouth Harbour Order 1920 Order to amend the Eyemouth Harbour Order 1882 to increase the rates and charges leviable at the harbour of Eyemouth in the county of Berwick and for other purposes.	
	Truro Harbour Order 1920 For the amendment of the Truro Harbour Orders 1903 and 1909 and for conferring further powers upon the mayor aldermen and citizens of the city of Truro in the county of Cornwall in relation to Truro Harbour.	
Land Drainage (Ouse) Provisional Order Confirmation Act 1920	10 & 11 Geo. 5. c. cxxii	4 August 1920
An Act to confirm Provisional Order under the Land Drainage Acts 1861 (Note: Land Drainage Act 1861 (24 & 25 Vict. c. 133)) and 1918 (Note: Land Drainage Act 1918 (8 & 9 Geo. 5. c. 17)) relating to an area drained by the River Ouse and its tributaries.
	Ouse Drainage Order 1920 Ouse Provisional Order.	
Aberdeen Corporation Order Confirmation Act 1920 (repealed)	10 & 11 Geo. 5. c. cxxiii	9 August 1920
An Act to confirm a Provisional Order under the Private Legislation Procedure (Scotland) Act 1899 relating to Aberdeen Corporation. (Repealed by Aberdeen Corporation (Administration Finance, &c.) Order Confirmation Act 1940 (3 & 4 Geo. 6. c. iii))
	Aberdeen Corporation Order 1920 Provisional Order to confer further powers on the Corporation of the City of Aberdeen in relation to their water undertaking and for other purposes.	
Pilotage Orders Confirmation (No. 3) Act 1920 (repealed)	10 & 11 Geo. 5. c. cxxiv	9 August 1920
An Act to confirm certain Pilotage Orders made by the Board of Trade under the Pilotage Act 1913 relating to the Pilotage Districts of the Clyde Dundee Fraserburgh and Peterhead. (Repealed by Statute Law (Repeals) Act 1995 (c. 44))
	Clyde Pilotage Order 1920 The Clyde Pilotage Order.	
	Dundee Pilotage Order 1920 Dundee Pilotage Order.	
	Fraserburgh Pilotage Order 1920 Fraserburgh Pilotage Order.	
	Peterhead Pilotage Order 1920 Peterhead Pilotage Order.	
Local Government Board (Ireland) Provisional Order Confirmation (No. 3) Act 1920	10 & 11 Geo. 5. c. cxxv	9 August 1920
An Act to confirm a Provisional Order of the Local Government Board for Ireland relating to the urban district of Lurgan.
	Lurgan Gas Order 1920	
Ministry of Health Provisional Order Confirmation (Chesterfield Extension) Act 1920	10 & 11 Geo. 5. c. cxxvi	9 August 1920
An Act to confirm a Provisional Order of the Minister of Health relating to Chesterfield.
	Chesterfield (Extension) Order 1920 Provisional Order made in pursuance of Sections 54 and 59 of the Local Government Act 1888.	
Mid-Glamorgan Water Act 1920	10 & 11 Geo. 5. c. cxxvii	9 August 1920
An Act to constitute a water board for Mid-Glamorgan with power to acquire certain water undertakings and works to construct new works and to supply water and for other purposes.
Wallasey Corporation Act 1920	10 & 11 Geo. 5. c. cxxviii	9 August 1920
An Act to alter the wards and to increase the number of aldermen and councillors of the borough of Wallasey to authorise the Corporation to provide and work omnibuses to consolidate the rates of the borough and to confer further powers upon the Corporation with reference to the health local government and improvement of the borough and for other purposes.
Life Association of Scotland Act 1920 (repealed)	10 & 11 Geo. 5. c. cxxix	9 August 1920
An Act to confer further powers on the Life Association of Scotland. (Repealed by Life Association of Scotland Act 1964 (c. vii))
Uxbridge and Wycombe District Gas Act 1920	10 & 11 Geo. 5. c. cxxx	9 August 1920
An Act to provide for the transfer of the undertaking of the High Wycombe Gas Light and Coke Company Limited to the Uxbridge Gas Company to extend the limits of supply of the latter company and to change their name and for other purposes.
Exmouth Urban District Council Act 1920	10 & 11 Geo. 5. c. cxxxi	9 August 1920
An Act to authorise the acquisition and management by the urban district council of Exmouth for recreation and other purposes of lands and foreshore within their district and for other purposes.
North British and Mercantile Insurance Company's Act 1920	10 & 11 Geo. 5. c. cxxxii	9 August 1920
An Act to provide for the substitution of a memorandum and articles of association for the provisions of the contracts of copartnery Royal Charter and private Acts now constituting and governing the North British and Mercantile Insurance Company and for the registration of the Company under the Companies Acts 1908 to 1917 as a company limited by shares and for other purposes.
Lever Brothers Limited (Wharves and Railways) Act 1920	10 & 11 Geo. 5. c. cxxxiii	9 August 1920
An Act to authorise Lever Brothers Limits to construct wharves a railway and other works in the parish of Bromborough in the county of Chester and for other purposes.
Mayor's and City of London Court Act 1920 (repealed)	10 & 11 Geo. 5. c. cxxxiv	16 August 1920
An Act to amalgamate the City of London Court with the Mayor's Court of London and for purposes in connection therewith. (Repealed by City of London (Courts) Act 1964 (c. iv))
Ministry of Health Provisional Order Confirmation (New Windsor Extension) Act 1920 (repealed)	10 & 11 Geo. 5. c. cxxxv	16 August 1920
An Act to confirm a Provisional Order of the Minister of Health relating to New Windsor. (Repealed by Berkshire Act 1986 (c. ii))
	New Windsor (Extension) Order 1920 Provisional Order made in pursuance of the Local Government Act 1888 for extending a Borough.	
Ministry of Health Provisional Order Confirmation (Widnes Extension) Act 1920 (repealed)	10 & 11 Geo. 5. c. cxxxvi	16 August 1920
An Act to confirm a Provisional Order of the Minister of Health relating to Widnes. (Repealed by Cheshire County Council Act 1980 (c. xiii))
	Widnes (Extension) Order 1920 Provisional Order made in pursuance of the Local Government Act 1888 for extending a Borough.	
Alloa Water Order Confirmation Act 1920	10 & 11 Geo. 5. c. cxxxvii	16 August 1920
An Act to confirm a Provisional Order under the Private Legislation Procedure (Scotland) Act 1899 relating to Alloa Water.
	Alloa Water Order 1920 Provisional Order to authorise the provost magistrates and councillors of the burgh of Alloa to borrow further moneys for their water undertaking and for other purposes.	
Coatbridge Burgh Order Confirmation Act 1920	10 & 11 Geo. 5. c. cxxxviii	16 August 1920
An Act to confirm a Provisional Order under the Private Legislation Procedure (Scotland) Act 1899 relating to Coatbridge Burgh.
	Coatbridge Burgh Order 1920 Provisional Order to extend the time for the completion of the works authorised by the Coatbridge Drainage and Burgh Extension Order 1914 to revive the powers and extend the time for the compulsory purchase of lands for such works to authorise the Coatbridge Town Council to borrow further money and to levy increased assessments and for other purposes.	
Royal Bank of Scotland Act 1920 (repealed)	10 & 11 Geo. 5. c. cxxxix	16 August 1920
An Act to amend the Royal Charters and Acts of Parliament relating to the Royal Bank of Scotland and to confer further powers on the Bank. (Repealed by Royal Bank of Scotland Order Confirmation Act 1970 (c. iii))
Wear Navigation and Sunderland Dock (Finance) Act 1920 (repealed)	10 & 11 Geo. 5. c. cxl	16 August 1920
An Act to provide for the temporary guarantee by the mayor aldermen and burgesses of the borough of Sunderland over a period of years of interest upon certain mortgages created by the River Wear Commissioners and to make other provisions with respect to such mortgages and for other purposes. (Repealed by Sunderland Corporation Act 1972 (c. xxiii))
Merthyr Tydfil Corporation Act 1920	10 & 11 Geo. 5. c. cxli	16 August 1920
An Act to empower the Corporation of Merthyr Tydfil to construct a street work; to provide and work omnibuses, and to provide recreation grounds, and to make further provision with regard to the construction of waterworks and the supply of water by the Corporation, and for other purposes.
Cardiff Corporation Act 1920	10 & 11 Geo. 5. c. cxlii	16 August 1920
An Act to empower the Lord Mayor, Aldermen, and Citizens of the city of Cardiff to construct additional waterworks; to construct and work new tramways; and to provide and use motor omnibuses; to make further provision for the improvement, health, and good government of the city, and for other purposes.
Llanelly Corporation Water Act 1920	10 & 11 Geo. 5. c. cxliii	16 August 1920
An Act to confer further powers on the Mayor, Aldermen, and Burgesses of the Borough of Llanelly in relation to their waterworks undertaking, and for other purposes.
Dublin Port and Docks Act 1920	10 & 11 Geo. 5. c. cxliv	16 August 1920
An Act to confer further powers upon the Dublin and Docks Board, to increase the maximum rates, dues, tolls, and charges leviable by that Board, and for other purposes.
Huddersfield Corporation (General Powers) Act 1920 (repealed)	10 & 11 Geo. 5. c. cxlv	16 August 1920
An Act to empower the Mayor, Aldermen, and Burgesses of the Borough of Huddersfield to construct tramways, street improvements, and other works; to confer further powers upon them with respect to their several undertakings, and for other purposes. (Repealed by West Yorkshire Act 1980 (c. xiv))
Yeovil Corporation Act 1920	10 & 11 Geo. 5. c. cxlvi	16 August 1920
An Act to empower the Mayor, Aldermen, and Burgesses of the Borough of Yeovil to construct additional waterworks; to increase the number of Aldermen and Councillors of the borough, and for other purposes.
London County Council (Money) Act 1920 (repealed)	10 & 11 Geo. 5. c. cxlvii	16 August 1920
An Act to regulate the expenditure on capital account and lending of money by the London County Council during the financial period from the first day of April, one thousand nine hundred and twenty, to the thirtieth day of September, one thousand nine hundred and twenty-one, and for other purposes. (Repealed by London County Council (Loans) Act 1955 (4 & 5 Eliz. 2. c. xxvi))
Salford Corporation Act 1920	10 & 11 Geo. 5. c. cxlviii	16 August 1920
An Act to empower the Mayor, Aldermen, and Burgesses of the county borough of Salford to make street works and improvements, and to construct tramways, and to provide and run motor omnibuses; to confer further powers with respect to their water, electric lighting, and markets undertakings; to make various provisions and to confer various powers in regard to the health and for the improvement and good government of the borough, and for other purposes.
Manchester Ship Canal Act 1920	10 & 11 Geo. 5. c. cxlix	16 August 1920
An Act to confer further powers upon the Manchester Ship Canal Company, and for other purposes.
Workington Harbour and Dock Act 1920 (repealed)	10 & 11 Geo. 5. c. cl	16 August 1920
An Act to empower the Workington Harbour and Dock Board to construct a dock extension and other works; to confer upon that Board additional financial and other powers, and for other purposes. (Repealed by Workington Harbour and Dock (Transfer) Act 1957 (5 & 6 Eliz. 2. c. xxxii))
London Electric, Metropolitan District, City and South London and Central London Railway Companies (Fares, &c.) Act 1920	10 & 11 Geo. 5. c. cli	16 August 1920
An Act to increase the maximum tolls, rates, and charges leviable by the London Electric, Metropolitan, District, City and South London, and Central London Railway Companies, and to repeal certain provisions as to workmen's trains and fares.
Bristol Corporation Act 1920	10 & 11 Geo. 5. c. clii	16 August 1920
An Act to empower the Lord Mayor, Aldermen, and Burgesses of the City of Bristol to construct new roads and a tramroad and other works, and for other purposes.
Southend-on-Sea Gas Act 1920	10 & 11 Geo. 5. c. cliii	16 August 1920
An Act to extend the limits of supply of the Southend Gas Company; to increase the standard price of the gas supplied by, and to alter other financial provisions relating to, the Company; to empower the Company to establish profit-sharing schemes for their employees, and for other purposes.
Londonderry Corporation Act 1920	10 & 11 Geo. 5. c. cliv	16 August 1920
An Act to extend the City of Londonderry; to provide for the transfer to the Mayor, Aldermen, and Burgesses of the said City of the undertaking of the Londonderry Bridge Commissioners, and to authorise the Corporation to maintain, improve, and work the same; to confer further powers upon them with respect to their markets, electricity, and water undertakings, and for other purposes.
Erith Improvement Act 1920	10 & 11 Geo. 5. c. clv	16 August 1920
An Act to authorise the urban district council of Erith to carry out street improvements and to provide and work omnibuses, to confer further powers upon them in regard to their tramway undertaking, and to make further provision for the improvement, health, and local government of the district, and for other purposes.
Inverness Water and Gas Order Confirmation Act 1920	10 & 11 Geo. 5. c. clvi	29 October 1920
An Act to confirm a Provisional Order under the Burgh Police (Scotland) Act, 1892, (Note: Burgh Police (Scotland) Act 1892 (55 & 56 Vict. c. 55)) relating to Inverness Water and Gas.
	Inverness Water and Gas Order 1920	
Aberdeen Harbour Order Confirmation Act 1920 (repealed)	10 & 11 Geo. 5. c. clvii	3 December 1920
An Act to confirm a Provisional Order under the Private Legislation Procedure (Scotland) Act, 1899, relating to Aberdeen Harbour. (Repealed by Aberdeen Harbour Order Confirmation Act 1960 (9 & 10 Eliz. 2. c. i))
	Aberdeen Harbour Order 1920	
Brodick, Lamlash, Loch Ranza and Whiting Bay Piers Order Confirmation Act 1920	10 & 11 Geo. 5. c. clviii	3 December 1920
An Act to confirm a Provisional Order under the Private Legislation Procedure (Scotland) Act, 1899, relating to Brodick, Lamlash, Loch Ranza and Whiting Bay Piers.
	Brodick, Lamlash, Loch Ranza and Whiting Bay Piers Order 1920	
Glasgow Trades House Order Confirmation Act 1920	10 & 11 Geo. 5. c. clix	3 December 1920
An Act to confirm a Provisional Order under the Private Legislation Procedure (Scotland) Act, 1899, relating to the Trades House of Glasgow.
	Glasgow Trades House Order 1920	
Falkirk and District Tramways Order Confirmation Act 1920	10 & 11 Geo. 5. c. clx	3 December 1920
An Act to confirm a Provisional Order under the Private Legislation Procedure (Scotland) Act, 1899, relating to Falkirk and District Tramways.
	Falkirk and District Tramways Order 1920	
Paisley Corporation (Inchinnan Opening Bridge) Order Confirmation Act 1920	10 & 11 Geo. 5. c. clxi	3 December 1920
An Act to confirm a Provisional Order under the Private Legislation Procedure (Scotland) Act, 1899, relating to Paisley Corporation (Inchinnan Opening Bridge).
	Paisley Corporation (Inchinnan Opening Bridge) Order 1920	
Dumbarton Burgh and County Tramways Order Confirmation Act 1920	10 & 11 Geo. 5. c. clxii	3 December 1920
An Act to confirm a Provisional Order under the Private Legislation Procedure (Scotland) Act, 1899, relating to Dumbarton Burgh and County Tramways.
	Dumbarton Burgh and County Tramways Order 1920	
Greenock Port and Harbours Order Confirmation Act 1920	10 & 11 Geo. 5. c. clxiii	3 December 1920
An Act to confirm a Provisional Order under the Private Legislation Procedure (Scotland) Act, 1899, relating to the port and harbours of Greenock.
	Greenock Port and Harbours Order 1920	
Local Government Board (Ireland) Provisional Orders Confirmation (No. 4) Act 1920	10 & 11 Geo. 5. c. clxiv	3 December 1920
An Act to confirm certain Provisional Orders of the Local Government Board for Ireland relating to the City of Dublin and the Rural District of Sligo.
	Dublin Sanitary Order 1920	
	Ballymote Waterworks Order 1920	
Derwent Valley Water Act 1920	10 & 11 Geo. 5. c. clxv	3 December 1920
An Act to confer further powers on the Derwent Valley Water Board, and for other purposes.
Pier and Harbour Order Confirmation (No. 3) Act 1920	10 & 11 Geo. 5. c. clxvi	23 December 1920
An Act to confirm a Provisional Order made by the Minister of Transport under the General Pier and Harbour Act, 1861, relating to Worthing Pier.
	Worthing Pier Order 1920	
Pier and Harbour Orders Confirmation (No. 4) Act 1920	10 & 11 Geo. 5. c. clxvii	23 December 1920
An Act to confirm certain Provisional Orders made by the Minister of Transport under the General Pier and Harbour Act, 1861, relating to Bangor (county Down), and Tralee and Fenit.
	Bangor Harbour Order 1920	
	Tralee and Fenit Pier and Harbour Order 1920	
Hulme Trust Estates (Non-Educational) Scheme Confirmation Act 1920	10 & 11 Geo. 5. c. clxviii	23 December 1920
An Act to confirm a Scheme of the Charity Commissioners for the application and management of the Charity called the Hulme Trust Estates (Non-Educational).
	Hulme Trust Estates (Non-Educational) Scheme.	
Baptist Chapels Scheme Confirmation Act 1920	10 & 11 Geo. 5. c. clxix	23 December 1920
An Act to confirm a Scheme of the Charity Commissioners for the application or management of certain charities.
	Baptist Chapels Scheme.	
Little Longstone Congregational Chapel Scheme Confirmation Act 1920	10 & 11 Geo. 5. c. clxx	23 December 1920
An Act to confirm a scheme of the Charity Commissioners for the application or management of the Charity consisting of the Congregational Chapel and Trust Property in the Parish of Little Longstone, in the County of Derby.
	Little Longstone Congregational Chapel Scheme.	
Lanarkshire Tramways Order Confirmation Act 1920	10 & 11 Geo. 5. c. clxxi	23 December 1920
An Act to confirm a Provisional Order under the Private Legislation Procedure (Scotland) Act, 1899, relating to Lanarkshire Tramways.
	Lanarkshire Tramways Order 1920	
London County Council (Tramways and Improvements) Act 1920	10 & 11 Geo. 5. c. clxxii	23 December 1920
An Act to empower the London County London Council to construct and work new tramways; to alter and reconstruct existing tramways and to make a new street, street improvements, and other works; to provide and work omnibuses, and for other purposes.
Port of London (Consolidation) Act 1920	10 & 11 Geo. 5. c. clxxiii	23 December 1920
An Act to consolidate, amend, and extend the statutory powers of the Port of London Authority, and for other purposes.

=== Private and personal acts ===
Short title	Citation	Royal assent
Long title
De Vesci's Divorce Act 1920 (Note: This act was not printed by the King's Printer)	10 & 11 Geo. 5. c. 1 Pr.	27 April 1920
An Act to dissolve the marriage of Georgiana Victoria, Viscountess de Vesci, of 16, Stanford Road, London, in the County of London, with No Richard Vesey, Viscount de Vesci, a major in the Irish Foot Guards, her now husband, and to enable her to marry again, and for other purposes.
Carbery's Divorce Act 1920	10 & 11 Geo. 5. c. 2 Pr.	2 July 1920
An Act to dissolve the marriage of Jose Baroness Carbery, of 5, Chester Place, London, in the county of London, with John Baron Carbery, of Castle Freke, in the county of Cork, Ireland, and to enable her to marry again, and for other purposes.
Cooper's Divorce Act 1920	10 & 11 Geo. 5. c. 3 Pr.	2 July 1920
An Act to dissolve the marriage of Bryan Ricco Cooper, of Markree Castle, Collooney, in the county of Sligo, major in His Majesty's Army, with Marion Dorothy Cooper, his now wife, and to enable him to marry again, and for other purposes.
White's Divorce Act 1920	10 & 11 Geo. 5. c. 4 Pr.	2 July 1920
An Act to dissolve the marriage of George Alfred White with Blanche White, his now wife, and to enable him to marry again, and for other purposes.
Fife-Young's Divorce Act 1920	10 & 11 Geo. 5. c. 5 Pr.	4 August 1920
An Act to dissolve the marriage of John James Fife-Young with Elizabeth Frances Fife-Young, his present wife, and to enable him to marry again, and for other purposes.
Osborne's Divorce Act 1920	10 & 11 Geo. 5. c. 6 Pr.	16 August 1920
An Act to dissolve the marriage of William Frank Osborne, of 18, Clifton Crescent, in the county of the city of Belfast, in Ireland, journalist, with Arabella Carmichael Osborne his now wife, and to enable him to marry again, and for other purposes.
Shekleton's Divorce Act 1920	10 & 11 Geo. 5. c. 7 Pr.	16 August 1920
An Act to dissolve the marriage of Richard Auchmuty Shekleton, of Rosebank, Holywood, county Down, Ireland, medical doctor, and recently a captain in the Royal Army Medical Corps, with Katherine Jessie Shekleton, his now wife, and to enable him to marry again, and for other purposes.

=== Sources ===
- Local and Personal Laws – via Google Books.

== See also ==
- List of acts of the Parliament of the United Kingdom
