= South Shields Corporation Tramways =

Tramway operator in England

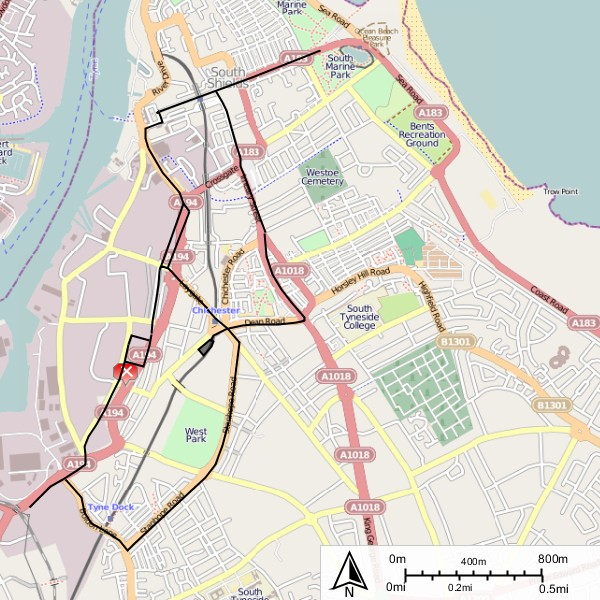
- Map of the routes of the South Shields Corporation Tramways

Operation
- Locale: South Shields
- Open: 30 March 1906
- Close: 31 March 1946
- Status: Closed

Infrastructure
- Track gauge: 1,435 mm (4 ft 8 1/2 in)
- Propulsion system: Electric

Statistics
- Route length: 7.51 miles (12.09 km)

South Shields Corporation Tramways operated an electric tramway service in South Shields between 1906 and 1946.

== History ==
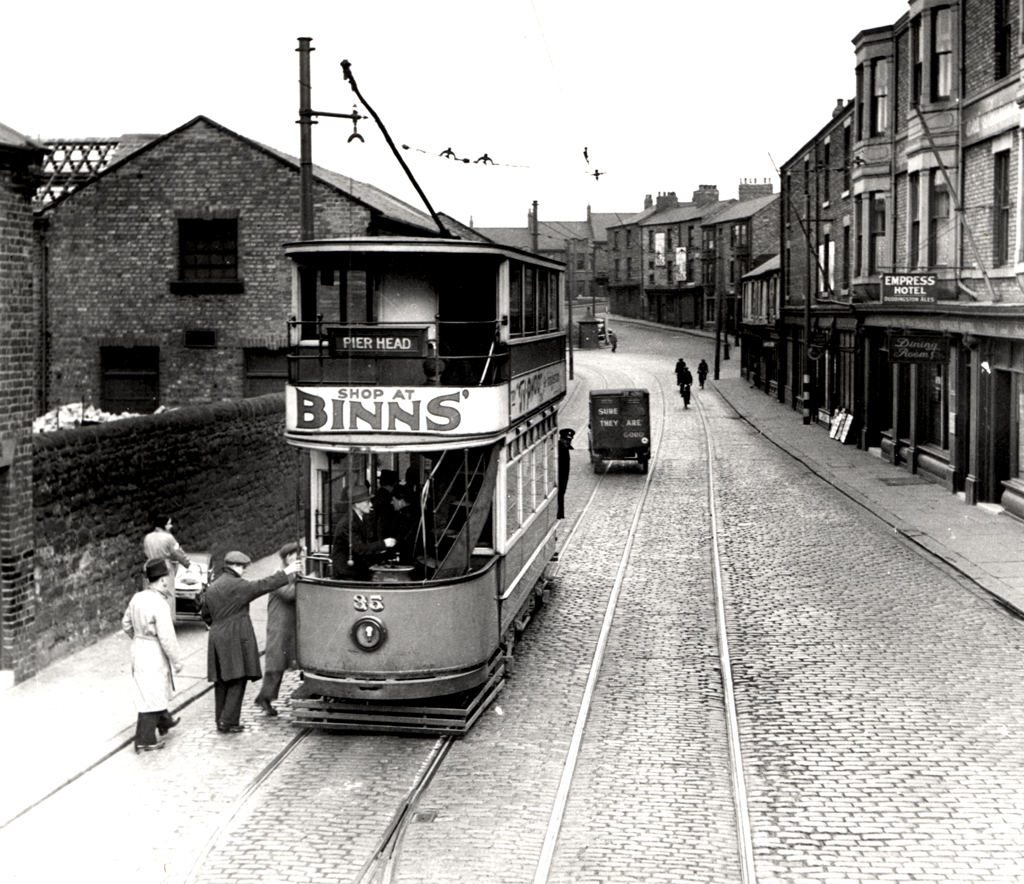
South Shields tram 35 on the Tyne Dock to Pierhead Route

South Shields Corporation Tramways took over the horse-drawn tramway network owned by the South Shields Tramways Company in 1906 and after a programme of modernisation and electrification, opened for service on 30 March 1906

The corporation obtained agreement with the neighbouring Jarrow and District Electric Tramway for through running, and accepted Jarrow tramcars on its own network. This arrangement lasted until the Jarrow Tramway closed in 1929.

== Fleet ==
- 1-10 Hurst Nelson 1906
- 11-20 United Electric Car Company 1906
- 21-35 United Electric Car Company 1907
- 36-40 Brush Electrical Engineering Company 1913
- 41-45 English Electric 1921
- 29 Brush Electrical Engineering Company 1906 for the Jarrow and District Electric Tramway No 5 obtained second hand in 1929
- 48 Brush Electrical Engineering Company 1906 for the Jarrow and District Electric Tramway No 6 obtained second hand in 1929
- 46 G.F. Milnes & Co. 1902 for the Tyneside Tramways and Tramroads Company No 4 obtained second hand in 1930
- 47 G.F. Milnes & Co. 1902 for the Tyneside Tramways and Tramroads Company No 3 obtained second hand in 1930
- 23 Wigan Corporation Tramways obtained second hand in 1931
- 33 Wigan Corporation Tramways obtained second hand in 1931
- 50 Wigan Corporation Tramways obtained second hand in 1931
- 51 Wigan Corporation Tramways obtained second hand in 1931
- 16 English Electric 1920 for the Dumbarton Burgh and County Tramways No 31 then Ayr Corporation Tramways No 29 obtained second hand in 1931
- 34 English Electric 1920 for the Dumbarton Burgh and County Tramways No 32 then Ayr Corporation Tramways No 30 obtained second hand in 1931
- 18 Yorkshire (West Riding) Tramways obtained second hand in 1932
- 20 Yorkshire (West Riding) Tramways obtained second hand in 1932
- 52 Brush Electrical Engineering Company 1936

== Closure ==
The service was closed on 31 March 1946 as the corporation moved to trolley bus operation.
