= Dyestuffs (Import Regulations) Act 1920 =

Act of the Parliament of the United Kingdom

Dyestuffs (Import Regulations) Act 1920 (Note: Section 5(2).)
- Act of Parliament
- Parliament of the United Kingdom
- Long title: An Act to regulate the importation of dyestuffs.
- Citation: 10 & 11 Geo. 5. c. 77
- Territorial extent: United Kingdom

Dates
- Royal assent: 23 December 1920
- Commencement: 15 January 1921 (Note: Section 5(3).)
- Expired: 15 January 1931 (Note: Section 5(1).)
- Repealed: 22 March 1960
Other legislation
Amended by	Customs and Excise Act 1952
Repealed by	European Free Trade Association Act 1960

Status: Repealed

Text of statute as originally enacted

The Dyestuffs (Import Regulations) Act 1920 (10 & 11 Geo. 5. c. 77) was an act of the Parliament of the United Kingdom. It came into effect on 15 January 1921 and it prohibited all imports of dyes except for special cases for ten years, although it was subsequently extended.

The act enforced a post-WWI protectionism in the British dyestuff industry. It prohibited the import of dyestuffs, except under licence granted by the Board of Trade on the recommendation of the Dyestuffs Advisory Licensing Committee. This was usually granted only if there was no British equivalent or if the British equivalent is relatively too expensive. Originally licences were granted when the price of the British product to the foreign equivalent is above 3:1. Later, the factor was reduced gradually to 1.75:1.

A specific target of the act was the German dyestuff industry. In 1914, a month after war broke out, Germany banned exports to Britain and its allies. This forced Britain to develop its own dyestuff industry. After the war, German dyestuff industry remained dominant on the global market, prompting the act to protect the British dyestuff industry.
