= Ayr Corporation Tramways =

Tramway operator in Scotland

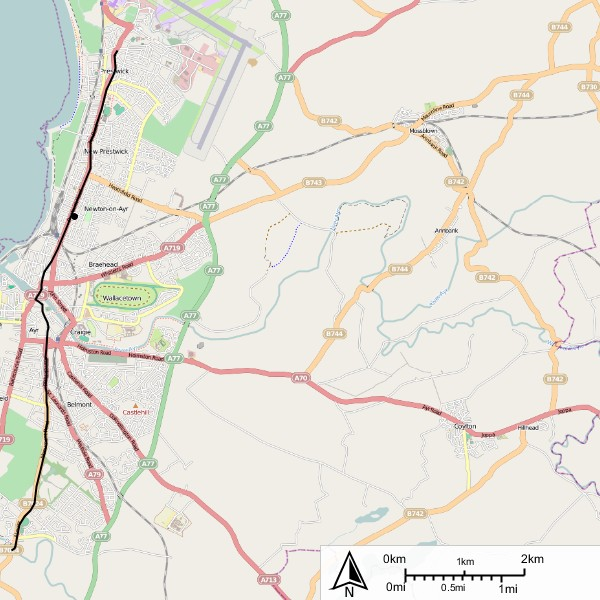
- Map of the route of Ayr Corporation Tramways

Operation
- Locale: Ayr
- Open: 26 September 1901
- Close: 31 December 1931
- Status: Closed

Infrastructure
- Track gauge: 1,435 mm (4 ft 8 1/2 in)
- Propulsion system: Electric
- Depots: Alderston Avenue, Ayr

Statistics
- Route length: 6.39 miles (10.28 km)

Ayr Corporation Tramways operated an electric tramway service in Ayr between 1901 and 1931.

== History ==
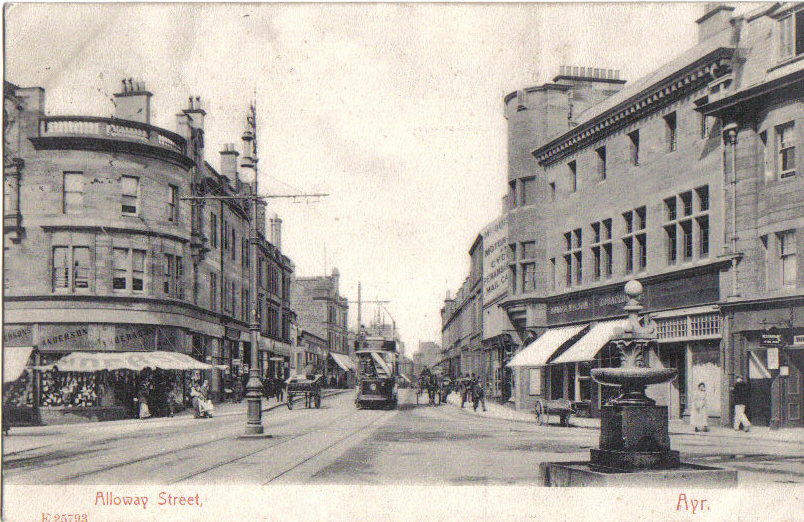
Ayr Corporation Tram on Alloway Street ca. 1904

Ayr Corporation Tramways opened for public service on 26 September 1901. The depot was located in Alderston Avenue, Ayr (grid reference NS 34410 23498). The line ran from Alloway to Prestwick.

In 1928 two tramcars were obtained from the Dumbarton Burgh and County Tramways. These survived the closure of the Ayr system in 1931 and were transferred to South Shields Corporation Tramways.

The system was taken over on 30 December 1931 by the Scottish Motor Traction Company and closed the following day.
