= Jarrow and District Electric Tramway =

Tramway operator in England

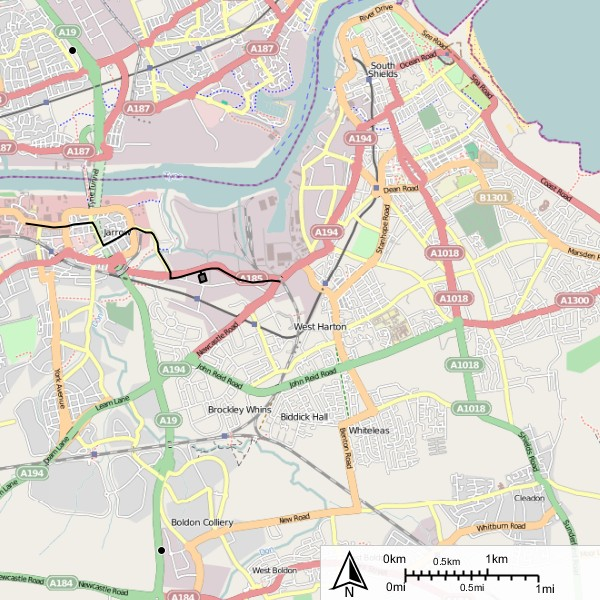
- Map of the route of the Jarrow and District Electric Tramway

Operation
- Locale: Jarrow
- Open: 29 Nov 1906
- Close: 30 June 1929
- Status: Closed

Infrastructure
- Track gauge: 1,435 mm (4 ft 8 1/2 in)
- Propulsion system: Electric

Statistics
- Route length: 2.54 miles (4.09 km)

The Jarrow and District Electric Tramway operated an electric tramway service in Jarrow between 1906 and 1929.

== History ==
The Jarrow and District Electric Traction Company was a subsidiary of British Electric Traction. It operated tramway services in Jarrow and the line through Tyne Dock connected with the tracks of the South Shields Corporation Tramways and through services were offered to South Shields. A reciprocal agreement allowed South Shields Corporation Tramways cars to operate over Jarrow company tracks. The Jarrow company received 3s 6d per mile from the South Shields Corporation Tramways to cover working expenses including electrical power and track maintenance.

== Closure ==
The company replaced its tram services with buses in 1929.
