= Tyneside Tramways and Tramroads Company =

Tramway operator in England

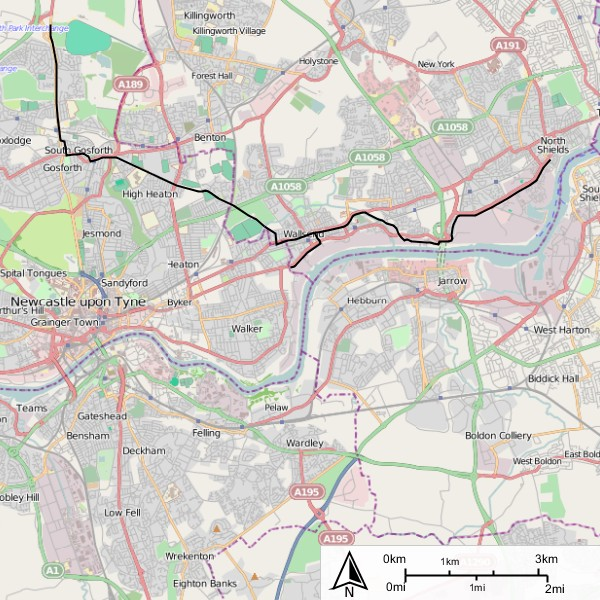
- Map of the route of the Tyneside Tramways and Tramroads Company

Operation
- Locale: Gosforth; Wallsend; North Shields
- Open: 4 September 1902
- Close: 6 April 1930
- Status: Closed
- Owner: British Electric Traction

Infrastructure
- Track gauge: 1,435 mm (4 ft 8 1/2 in)
- Propulsion system: Electric

Statistics
- Route length: 10.99 miles (17.69 km)

Tyneside Tramways and Tramroads Company operated an electric tramway service in Gosforth, Wallsend and North Shields between 1902 and 1930.

== Overview ==
=== History ===
Tyneside Tramways and Tramroad Act 1901
- Act of Parliament
- Parliament of the United Kingdom
- Long title: An Act to authorise the construction of tramways and a tramroad in the urban districts of Walker Wallsend Willington Quay and Gosforth the borough of Tynemouth and the parishes of Willington and Longbenton in the county of Northumberland and for other purposes.
- Citation: 1 Edw. 7. c. ccxxxviii

Dates
- Royal assent: 9 August 1901

Tyneside Tramways and Tramroads Act 1902
- Act of Parliament
- Parliament of the United Kingdom
- Long title: An Act to confer further powers upon the Tyneside Tramways and Tramroads Company for the construction of tramways and tramroads and for other purposes.
- Citation: 2 Edw. 7. c. cxxxii

Dates
- Royal assent: 28 April 1902

Tyneside Tramways and Tramroads Act 1904
- Act of Parliament
- Parliament of the United Kingdom
- Long title: An Act to confer further powers upon the Tyneside Tramways and Tramroads Company with respect to the construction and maintenance of works and the acquisition of lands and for other purposes.
- Citation: 4 Edw. 7. c. ccv

Dates
- Royal assent: 15 August 1904

Other legislation
- Repealed by: Tyne and Wear Act 1980

Status: Repealed

Text of statute as originally enacted

Tyneside Tramways and Tramroads Company built the electric tramway on the route of the Coxlodge Waggonway (which was also known as the Gosforth and Kenton Waggonway). It was authorised by the Tyneside Tramways and Tramroad Act 1901 (1 Edw. 7. c. ccxxxviii), the Tyneside Tramways and Tramroads Act 1902 (2 Edw. 7. c. cxxxii) and the Tyneside Tramways and Tramroads Act 1904 (4 Edw. 7. c. ccv).

At the western end, it connected with Newcastle Corporation Tramways. It had running powers over the Newcastle Corporation Tramways lines, and there was a reciprocal arrangement for corporation cars on its tracks. Services started on 4 September 1902.

At the eastern end, it connected with the Tynemouth and District Electric Traction Company. However, the Tynemouth company tracks were of a different gauge, so through running was impossible. There was a short section of dual gauge track where the systems met, to allow cars from the different systems to meet for a convenient interchange of passengers.

The chairman of the company was John Theodore Merz. He was also a director of the Swan Electric Light Company. The Northern General Transport Company (a subsidiary of British Electric Traction took a controlling interest in the Tyneside Tramways and Tramroads Company in 1913.

=== Fleet ===
Car number 4 built in 1902 by G. F. Milnes & Co. was sold in 1930 to South Shields Corporation Tramways where it ran as No 46.

=== Closure ===
In 1920, the company applied for an act of Parliament, enabling them to run omnibus services.

Tyneside Tramways and Tramroads Act 1929
- Act of Parliament
- Parliament of the United Kingdom
- Long title: An Act to make provision as to the abandonment of the tramways and tramroads of the Tyneside Tramways and Tramroads Company to enlarge the powers of the Company with respect to the provision and running of omnibuses and for other purposes.
- Citation: 20 & 21 Geo. 5. c. xxxvi

Dates
- Royal assent: 20 December 1929

Other legislation
- Repealed by: Tyne & Wear Act 1980

Status: Repealed

Text of statute as originally enacted

The tramway service closed on 6 April 1930 after which the company ran a motor bus service until 1975 as the Tyneside Omnibus Company
