= Dumbarton Burgh and County Tramways =

Tramway operator in Scotland

Operation
- Locale: Dumbarton
- Open: 20 February 1907
- Close: 3 March 1928
- Status: Closed

Infrastructure
- Track gauge: 4 ft 7 3/4 in (1,416 mm)
- Propulsion system: Electric
- Depot: Hartfield Gardens

Statistics
- Route length: 13.1 miles (21.1 km)

Dumbarton Burgh and County Tramways provided a tramway service in Dumbarton from 1907 to 1928.

== History ==
The Dumbarton Burgh and Country Tramway were constructed by Dick, Kerr & Co. After initially being operated by the Electric Supply Corporation, it was transferred to the Dumbarton Burgh and County Tramways Company.

It ran from Dalmuir West through Dumbarton to Balloch, with a branch to Barloan Toll, and a branch to Jamestown.

Despite the connection with Glasgow Corporation Tramways at Dalmuir West, through running was not agreed.

== Closure ==
The last tramway service ran on 3 March 1928, and two tramcars were transferred to Ayr Corporation Tramways.
