= List of acts of the Parliament of the United Kingdom from 1917 =

This is a complete list of acts of the Parliament of the United Kingdom for the year 1917.

Note that the first parliament of the United Kingdom was held in 1801; parliaments between 1707 and 1800 were either parliaments of Great Britain or of Ireland). For acts passed up until 1707, see the list of acts of the Parliament of England and the list of acts of the Parliament of Scotland. For acts passed from 1707 to 1800, see the list of acts of the Parliament of Great Britain. See also the list of acts of the Parliament of Ireland.

For acts of the devolved parliaments and assemblies in the United Kingdom, see the list of acts of the Scottish Parliament, the list of acts of the Northern Ireland Assembly, and the list of acts and measures of Senedd Cymru; see also the list of acts of the Parliament of Northern Ireland.

The number shown after each act's title is its chapter number. Acts passed before 1963 are cited using this number, preceded by the year(s) of the reign during which the relevant parliamentary session was held; thus the Union with Ireland Act 1800 is cited as "39 & 40 Geo. 3. c. 67", meaning the 67th act passed during the session that started in the 39th year of the reign of George III and which finished in the 40th year of that reign. Note that the modern convention is to use Arabic numerals in citations (thus "41 Geo. 3" rather than "41 Geo. III"). Acts of the last session of the Parliament of Great Britain and the first session of the Parliament of the United Kingdom are both cited as "41 Geo. 3". Acts passed from 1963 onwards are simply cited by calendar year and chapter number.

== 7 & 8 Geo. 5 ==
The seventh session of the 30th Parliament of the United Kingdom, which met from 7 February 1917 until 6 February 1918.

This session was also traditionally cited as 7 & 8 Geo. 5.

=== Public general acts ===
Short title	Citation	Royal assent
Long title
Consolidated Fund (No. 1) Act 1917 (repealed)	7 & 8 Geo. 5. c. 1	28 February 1917
An Act to apply certain sums out of the Consolidated Fund to the service of the years ending on the thirty-first day of March one thousand nine hundred and seventeen and one thousand nine hundred and eighteen. (Repealed by Statute Law Revision Act 1927 (17 & 18 Geo. 5. c. 42))
Census of Production Act 1917 (repealed)	7 & 8 Geo. 5. c. 2	28 March 1917
An Act to amend the Census of Production Act, 1906, (Note: Census of Production Act 1906 (6 Edw. 7. c. 49)) with respect to the times at which a Census of Production may be taken. (Repealed for England and Wales and Scotland by Statistics of Trade Act 1947 (10 & 11 Geo. 6. c. 39) and for Northern Ireland by Statistics of Trade Act (Northern Ireland) 1949 (c. 7 (N.I.)))
Railway Passenger Duty Act 1917 (repealed)	7 & 8 Geo. 5. c. 3	28 March 1917
An Act to relieve railway companies whose railroads are under the control of His Majesty from keeping separate accounts in respect of railway passenger duty, and from making separate payments in respect thereof. (Repealed by Statute Law Revision Act 1927 (17 & 18 Geo. 5. c. 42))
Grand Juries (Suspension) Act 1917 (repealed)	7 & 8 Geo. 5. c. 4	28 March 1917
An Act to provide for the Suspension of Grand Juries in connection with the present War. (Repealed by Statute Law Revision Act 1927 (17 & 18 Geo. 5. c. 42))
Ecclesiastical Services (Omission on account of War) Act 1917 (repealed)	7 & 8 Geo. 5. c. 5	28 March 1917
An Act to enable Ecclesiastical Services in certain cases to be omitted on account of the War. (Repealed by Statute Law Revision Act 1927 (17 & 18 Geo. 5. c. 42))
Ministry of National Service Act 1917 (repealed)	7 & 8 Geo. 5. c. 6	28 March 1917
An Act for establishing a Ministry of National Service, and for purposes incidental thereto. (Repealed by Statute Law Revision Act 1927 (17 & 18 Geo. 5. c. 42))
Consolidated Fund (No. 2) Act 1917 (repealed)	7 & 8 Geo. 5. c. 7	28 March 1917
An Act to apply certain sums out of the Consolidated Fund to the service of the years ending on the thirty-first day of March one thousand nine hundred and seventeen and one thousand nine hundred and eighteen. (Repealed by Statute Law Revision Act 1927 (17 & 18 Geo. 5. c. 42))
Coal Mines Regulation (Amendment) Act 1917 (repealed)	7 & 8 Geo. 5. c. 8	28 March 1917
An Act to extend section four of the Coal Mines Regulation Act, 1908, (Note: Coal Mines Regulation Act 1908 (8 Edw. 7. c. 57)) to Mines other than Coal Mines. (Repealed by Coal Industry Act 1992 (c. 17))
Army (Annual) Act 1917 (repealed)	7 & 8 Geo. 5. c. 9	5 April 1917
An Act to provide, during Twelve Months, for the Discipline and Regulation of the Army. (Repealed by Statute Law Revision Act 1927 (17 & 18 Geo. 5. c. 42) and Revision of the Army and Air Force Acts (Transitional Provisions) Act 1955 (3 & 4 Eliz. 2. c. 20))
Army (Annual) Act (1916) Amendment Act 1917 (repealed)	7 & 8 Geo. 5. c. 10	5 April 1917
An Act to amend the Schedule to the Army (Annual) Act, 1916. (Note: Army (Annual) Act 1916 (6 & 7 Geo. 5. c. 5)) (Repealed by Statute Law Revision Act 1927 (17 & 18 Geo. 5. c. 42))
Naval Discipline (Delegation of Powers) Act 1917 (repealed)	7 & 8 Geo. 5. c. 11	5 April 1917
An Act to amend the Naval Discipline (Delegation of Powers) Act, 1916, (Note: Naval Discipline (Delegation of Powers) Act 1916 (6 & 7 Geo. 5. c. 17)) with respect to the Officers to whom powers under that Act may be delegated. (Repealed by Statute Law Revision Act 1927 (17 & 18 Geo. 5. c. 42))
Military Service (Review of Exceptions) Act 1917 (repealed)	7 & 8 Geo. 5. c. 12	5 April 1917
An Act to enable the exception from Military Service of Men excepted on the ground of previous rejection, or the previous relinquishment of, or discharge from, Naval or Military Service, or unsuitability for Foreign Service, to be reviewed. (Repealed by Military Service (No. 2) Act 1918 (8 & 9 Geo. 5. c. 5))
Parliament and Local Elections Act 1917 (repealed)	7 & 8 Geo. 5. c. 13	26 April 1917
An Act to amend and extend the Parliament and Local Elections Act, 1916. (Note: Parliament and Local Elections Act 1916 (6 & 7 Geo. 5. c. 44)) (Repealed by Parliament and Local Elections (No. 2) Act 1917 (7 & 8 Geo. 5. c. 50) and Statute Law Revision Act 1927 (17 & 18 Geo. 5. c. 42))
Naval and Military War Pensions, &c. (Administrative Expenses) Act 1917	7 & 8 Geo. 5. c. 14	17 May 1917
An Act to make provision with respect to the administrative expenses of the Statutory Committee and of Local and District Committees under the Naval and Military War Pensions, &c. Act, 1915; (Note: Naval and Military War Pensions, &c. Act 1915 (5 & 6 Geo. 5. c. 83)) and for certain other purposes connected with Pensions and Allowances.
National Insurance (Part I. Amendment) Act 1917 (repealed)	7 & 8 Geo. 5. c. 15	17 May 1917
An Act to amend the enactments relating to National Health Insurance with respect to persons suffering from disablement in consequence of the present War. (Repealed by National Health Insurance Act 1924 (14 & 15 Geo. 5. c. 38))
Societies (Suspension of Meetings) Act 1917 (repealed)	7 & 8 Geo. 5. c. 16	17 May 1917
An Act to enable Meetings of Approved Societies, Friendly Societies, and Trade Unions to be dispensed with during the present War, and for purposes connected therewith. (Repealed by Statute Law Revision Act 1927 (17 & 18 Geo. 5. c. 42))
Consolidated Fund (No. 3) Act 1917 (repealed)	7 & 8 Geo. 5. c. 17	17 May 1917
An Act to apply a sum out of the Consolidated Fund to the service of the year ending on the thirty-first day of March one thousand nine hundred and eighteen. (Repealed by Statute Law Revision Act 1927 (17 & 18 Geo. 5. c. 42))
Companies (Foreign Interests) Act 1917 (repealed)	7 & 8 Geo. 5. c. 18	24 May 1917
An Act to prohibit the alteration, except with the consent of the Board of Trade, of Articles of Association or Regulations which restrict Foreign Interests in Companies, and for other purposes connected therewith. (Repealed for England and Wales and Scotland by Companies Act 1928 (18 & 19 Geo. 5. c. 45) and for Northern Ireland by Companies Act (Northern Ireland) 1930 (20 & 21 Geo. 5. c. 12 (N.I.)))
Coroners (Emergency Provisions) Act 1917 (repealed)	7 & 8 Geo. 5. c. 19	24 May 1917
An Act to reduce, in connection with the present War, the Number of Jurors at Coroners' Inquests. (Repealed for the United Kingdom by Coroners (Amendment) Act 1926 (16 & 17 Geo. 5. c. 59) and for the Isle of Man by Statute Law (Repeals) Act 2004 (c. 14))
Billeting of Civilians Act 1917 (repealed)	7 & 8 Geo. 5. c. 20	24 May 1917
An Act to make provision for the Billeting of Persons engaged on Work of National Importance for the purposes of the present War. (Repealed by Statute Law Revision Act 1927 (17 & 18 Geo. 5. c. 42))
Venereal Disease Act 1917 (repealed)	7 & 8 Geo. 5. c. 21	24 May 1917
An Act to prevent the treatment of Venereal Disease otherwise than by duly qualified medical Practitioners, and to control the supply of Remedies therefor; and for other matters connected therewith. (Repealed by Statute Law (Repeals) Act 1998 (c. 43))
Royal Naval Volunteer Reserve Act 1917 (repealed)	7 & 8 Geo. 5. c. 22	10 July 1917
An Act to extend during the present War the term of service of members of the Royal Naval Volunteer Reserve. (Repealed by Statute Law Revision Act 1927 (17 & 18 Geo. 5. c. 42))
Gaming Machines (Scotland) Act 1917 (repealed)	7 & 8 Geo. 5. c. 23	10 July 1917
An Act to prohibit the use in shops and other places in Scotland of certain Machines or Mechanical Contrivances by the operation of which prizes or stakes in money or kind are won or lost by people resorting to such places. (Repealed by Betting and Gaming Act 1960 (8 & 9 Eliz. 2. c. 60))
Trade Union (Amalgamation) Act 1917 (repealed)	7 & 8 Geo. 5. c. 24	10 July 1917
An Act to amend the Trade Union Act Amendment Act, 1876, (Note: Trade Union Act Amendment Act 1876 (39 & 40 Vict. c. 22)) with respect to the amalgamation of Trade Unions. (Repealed for England and Wales and Scotland by Trade Union (Amalgamations, etc.) Act 1964 (c. 24) and for Northern Ireland by Trade Union (Amalgamations, etc.) Act (Northern Ireland) 1965 (c. 2 (N.I.)))
Courts (Emergency Powers) Act 1917 (repealed)	7 & 8 Geo. 5. c. 25	10 July 1917
An Act to amend the Courts (Emergency Powers) Acts, 1914 to 1916, and the Increase of Rent and Mortgage Interest (War Restrictions) Act, 1915, (Note: Increase of Rent and Mortgage Interest (War Restrictions) Act 1915 (5 & 6 Geo. 5. c. 97)) and to grant relief in connexion with the present war from liabilities and disqualifications arising out of certain contracts. (Repealed by Statute Law Revision Act 1964 (c. 79))
Military Service (Conventions with Allied States) Act 1917 (repealed)	7 & 8 Geo. 5. c. 26	10 July 1917
An Act to enable His Majesty in Council to carry into effect conventions which may be made with Allied and other States as to the mutual liability of His Majesty's subjects and subjects of the Allied and other States to military service. (Repealed by Statute Law Revision Act 1927 (17 & 18 Geo. 5. c. 42))
Confirmation of Executors (War Service) (Scotland) Act 1917 (repealed)	7 & 8 Geo. 5. c. 27	2 August 1917
An Act to provide facilities for expeding confirmation in Scotland to estates of persons serving in Naval or Military Service during the present War. (Repealed by Statute Law Revision Act 1927 (17 & 18 Geo. 5. c. 42))
Companies (Particulars as to Directors) Act 1917 (repealed)	7 & 8 Geo. 5. c. 28	2 August 1917
An Act to provide for the disclosure of certain particulars respecting the Directors of Companies. (Repealed for England and Wales and Scotland by Companies Act 1929 (19 & 20 Geo. 5. c. 23) and for Northern Ireland by Companies Act (Northern Ireland) 1932 (22 & 23 Geo. 5. c. 7 (N.I.)))
Wesleyan Methodists (Appointments during the War) Act 1917 (repealed)	7 & 8 Geo. 5. c. 29	2 August 1917
An Act to modify, during the continuance of the present War, and for a certain period thereafter, certain provisions contained in a Deed of Declaration or Deed Poll of the Reverend John Wesley, dated the twenty-eighth day of February, seventeen hundred and eighty-four. (Repealed by Statute Law Revision Act 1927 (17 & 18 Geo. 5. c. 42))
Local Government (Allotments and Land Cultivation) (Ireland) Act 1917 (repealed)	7 & 8 Geo. 5. c. 30	2 August 1917
An Act to enable Local Authorities in Ireland to provide allotments and otherwise promote the cultivation of land, and for other purposes incidental thereto. (Repealed by Statute Law Revision Act 1927 (17 & 18 Geo. 5. c. 42))
Finance Act 1917	7 & 8 Geo. 5. c. 31	2 August 1917
An Act to grant certain duties of Customs and Inland Revenue (including Excise), to alter other duties, and to amend the Law relating to Customs and Inland Revenue (including Excise) and the National Debt, and to make further provision in connection with Finance.
Public Works Loans Act 1917 (repealed)	7 & 8 Geo. 5. c. 32	2 August 1917
An Act to grant Money for the purpose of certain Local Loans out of the Local Loans Fund, and for other purposes relating to Local Loans. (Repealed by Public Works Loans Act 1964 (c. 9))
Consolidated Fund (No. 4) Act 1917 (repealed)	7 & 8 Geo. 5. c. 33	2 August 1917
An Act to apply a sum out of the Consolidated Fund to the service of the year ending on the thirty-first day of March one thousand nine hundred and eighteen. (Repealed by Statute Law Revision Act 1927 (17 & 18 Geo. 5. c. 42))
Naval Discipline Act 1917 (repealed)	7 & 8 Geo. 5. c. 34	2 August 1917
An Act to amend Section 74A of the Naval Discipline Act. (Note: Naval Discipline Act 1866 (29 & 30 Vict. c. 109)) (Repealed by Naval Discipline Act 1957 (5 & 6 Eliz. 2. c. 53))
Isle of Man (Customs) Act 1917 (repealed)	7 & 8 Geo. 5. c. 35	21 August 1917
An Act to amend the Law with respect to Customs in the Isle of Man. (Repealed by Statute Law Revision Act 1927 (17 & 18 Geo. 5. c. 42))
Police Constables (Naval and Military Service) Act 1917 (repealed)	7 & 8 Geo. 5. c. 36	21 August 1917
An Act to amend section one of the Police Reservists (Allowances) Act, 1914, (Note: Police Reservists (Allowances) Act 1914 (4 & 5 Geo. 5. c. 34)) as extended by subsequent enactments. (Repealed by Statute Law (Repeals) Act 1973 (c. 39))
Naval and Military War Pensions, &c. (Transfer of Powers) Act 1917 (repealed)	7 & 8 Geo. 5. c. 37	21 August 1917
An Act to provide for the dissolution of the Statutory Committee established under the Naval and Military War Pensions, &c., Act, 1915, and for the transfer of their powers, duties, and functions to the Minister of Pensions, and for purposes connected therewith. (Repealed by Statute Law (Repeals) Act 1981 (c. 19))
Expiring Laws Continuance Act 1917 (repealed)	7 & 8 Geo. 5. c. 38	21 August 1917
An Act to continue certain Expiring Laws. (Repealed by Statute Law Revision Act 1927 (17 & 18 Geo. 5. c. 42))
Fishery Harbours (Continuance of Powers) Act 1917 (repealed)	7 & 8 Geo. 5. c. 39	21 August 1917
An Act to revive and continue temporarily the power of making Orders under the Fishery Harbours Act, 1915. (Note: Fishery Harbours Act 1915 (5 & 6 Geo. 5. c. 48)) (Repealed by Statute Law Revision Act 1927 (17 & 18 Geo. 5. c. 42))
Public Health (Prevention and Treatment of Disease) (Ireland) Act 1917 (repealed)	7 & 8 Geo. 5. c. 40	21 August 1917
An Act to amend section one hundred and forty-eight of the Public Health (Ireland) Act, 1878, (Note: Public Health (Ireland) Act 1878 (41 & 42 Vict. c. 52)) as respects the Prevention and Treatment of Disease in Ireland. (Repealed by Statute Law Revision Act (Northern Ireland) 1954 (c. 35 (N.I.)))
War Loan Act 1917 (repealed)	7 & 8 Geo. 5. c. 41	21 August 1917
An Act to make further provision for raising Money for the present War, and for purposes incidental thereto. (Repealed by National Debt Act 1958 (7 & 8 Eliz. 2. c. 6))
Workmen's Compensation (War Addition) Act 1917 (repealed)	7 & 8 Geo. 5. c. 42	21 August 1917
An Act to provide for an addition during the present war and a period of six months thereafter to the amount of the compensation payable under the Workmen's Compensation Act, 1906, (Note: Workmen's Compensation Act 1906 (6 Edw. 7. c. 58)) in cases of total incapacity. (Repealed for England and Wales and Scotland by Workmen's Compensation Act 1923 (13 & 14 Geo. 5. c. 42) and for Northern Ireland by Workmen's Compensation Act (Northern Ireland) 1923 (13 & 14 Geo. 5. c. 33 (N.I.)))
Solicitors (Examination) Act 1917 (repealed)	7 & 8 Geo. 5. c. 43	21 August 1917
An Act to amend, in connection with the present war, the Law relating to the Qualifying Examinations for Solicitors. (Repealed by Statute Law Revision Act 1927 (17 & 18 Geo. 5. c. 42))
New Ministries Act 1917 (repealed)	7 & 8 Geo. 5. c. 44	21 August 1917
An Act to provide for the establishment of a Ministry of Reconstruction, and to make provision as to the right of certain Ministers to sit in Parliament. (Repealed by Statute Law Revision Act 1927 (17 & 18 Geo. 5. c. 42))
Munitions of War Act 1917 (repealed)	7 & 8 Geo. 5. c. 45	21 August 1917
An Act to extend and amend the Munitions of War Acts, 1915 (Note: Munitions of War Act 1915 (5 & 6 Geo. 5. c. 54)) and 1916. (Note: Munitions of War (Amendment) Act 1916 (5 & 6 Geo. 5. c. 99)) (Repealed by Wages (Temporary Regulation) Act 1918 (8 & 9 Geo. 5. c. 61) and Statute Law Revision Act 1927 (17 & 18 Geo. 5. c. 42))
Corn Production Act 1917 (repealed)	7 & 8 Geo. 5. c. 46	21 August 1917
An Act for encouraging the production of Corn, and for purposes connected therewith (including provision as to Agricultural Wages and Rents). (Repealed by Corn Production Acts (Repeal) Act 1921 (11 & 12 Geo. 5. c. 48))
Titles Deprivation Act 1917	7 & 8 Geo. 5. c. 47	8 November 1917
An Act to deprive Enemy Peers and Princes of British Dignities and Titles.
Bills of Exchange (Time of Noting) Act 1917	7 & 8 Geo. 5. c. 48	8 November 1917
An Act to amend the Bills of Exchange Act, 1882, (Note: Bills of Exchange Act 1882 (45 & 46 Vict. c. 61)) with respect to the time for noting Bills.
Consolidated Fund (No. 5) Act 1917 (repealed)	7 & 8 Geo. 5. c. 49	8 November 1917
An Act to apply certain sums out of the Consolidated Fund to the service of the years ending on the thirty-first day of March one thousand nine hundred and sixteen and one thousand nine hundred and eighteen. (Repealed by Statute Law Revision Act 1927 (17 & 18 Geo. 5. c. 42))
Parliament and Local Elections (No. 2) Act 1917 (repealed)	7 & 8 Geo. 5. c. 50	29 November 1917
An Act to make further provision for the prolongation of the present Parliament, and the postponement of Local Elections. (Repealed by Parliament and Local Elections Act 1918 (8 & 9 Geo. 5. c. 22) and Statute Law Revision Act 1927 (17 & 18 Geo. 5. c. 42))
Air Force (Constitution) Act 1917	7 & 8 Geo. 5. c. 51	29 November 1917
An Act to make provision for the establishment, administration, and discipline of an Air Force, the establishment of an Air Council, and for purposes connected therewith.
Appropriation Act 1917 (repealed)	7 & 8 Geo. 5. c. 52	20 December 1917
An Act to apply a sum out of the Consolidated Fund to the service of the year ending on the thirty-first day of March one thousand nine hundred and eighteen, and to appropriate the Supplies granted in this Session of Parliament. (Repealed by Statute Law Revision Act 1927 (17 & 18 Geo. 5. c. 42))
Education (Provision of Meals) (Ireland) Act 1917 (repealed)	7 & 8 Geo. 5. c. 53	20 December 1917
An Act to amend the Education (Provision of Meals) (Ireland) Acts, 1914 (Note: Education (Provision of Meals) (Ireland) Act 1914 (4 & 5 Geo. 5. c. 35)) and 1916. (Note: Education (Provision of Meals) (Ireland) Act 1916 (6 & 7 Geo. 5. c. 10)) (Repealed by Education Act (Northern Ireland) 1923 (13 & 14 Geo. 5. c. 21 (N.I.)))
Naval and Military War Pensions, &c. (Committees) Act 1917 (repealed)	7 & 8 Geo. 5. c. 54	20 December 1917
An Act to provide for the inclusion on committees constituted under the Naval and Military War Pensions, &c. Act, 1915, of disabled men discharged from the Naval and Military Services of His Majesty and of women in receipt of Pensions. (Repealed by Statute Law Revision Act 1927 (17 & 18 Geo. 5. c. 42) and Statute Law (Repeals) Act 1989 (c. 43))
Chequers Estate Act 1917	7 & 8 Geo. 5. c. 55	20 December 1917
An Act to confirm and give effect to a deed of settlement relating to the Chequers Estate and other property and for purposes connected therewith.

=== Local acts ===
Short title	Citation	Royal assent
Long title
Land Drainage (Ramsey) Provisional Order Confirmation Act 1917	7 & 8 Geo. 5. c. i	17 May 1917
An Act to confirm a Provisional Order under the Land Drainage Act 1914 (Note: Land Drainage Act 1914 (5 & 6 Geo. 5. c. 4)) relating to Ramsey First Hollow Drainage District.
West Kent Electric Power Act 1917	7 & 8 Geo. 5. c. ii	17 May 1917
An Act to amend the capital powers of the West Kent Electric Company Limited and for other purposes.
Mansfield Railway Act 1917	7 & 8 Geo. 5. c. iii	24 May 1917
An Act to authorise the Mansfield Railway Company to raise further capital and for other purposes.
South Staffordshire Mond Gas (Power and Heating) Company Act 1917	7 & 8 Geo. 5. c. iv	24 May 1917
An Act to confer further powers upon the South Staffordshire Mond Gas (Power and Heating) Company.
Yorkshire Registries (North Riding) Amendment Act 1917 (repealed)	7 & 8 Geo. 5. c. v	24 May 1917
An Act to amend the Yorkshire Registries Act 1884 (Note: Yorkshire Registries Act 1884 (47 & 48 Vict. c. 54)) in its application to the North Riding of the County of York. (Repealed by Law of Property Act 1969 (c. 59))
Aluminium Corporation (Conversion of Shares) Act 1917	7 & 8 Geo. 5. c. vi	24 May 1917
An Act for enabling the Aluminium Corporation Limited to arrange for the extinction of its participating shares and for issuing preference stock in satisfaction of such shares and for other purposes.
Provisional Order (Marriages) Confirmation Act 1917 (repealed)	7 & 8 Geo. 5. c. vii	24 May 1917
An Act to confirm a Provisional Order made by one of His Majesty's Principal Secretaries of State under the Provisional Order (Marriages) Act 1905. (Note: Provisional Order (Marriages) Act 1905 (5 Edw. 7. c. 23)) (Repealed by Statute Law (Repeals) Act 1977 (c. 18))
	St. John Great Wollaston St. Alphege Greenwich and Bethesda Chapel Narberth Order.	
Perth School Board Order Confirmation Act 1917	7 & 8 Geo. 5. c. viii	24 May 1917
An Act to confirm a Provisional Order under the Private Legislation Procedure (Scotland) Act 1899 (Note: Private Legislation Procedure (Scotland) Act 1899 (62 & 63 Vict. c. 47)) relating to the School Board of Perth.
	Perth School Board Order 1917 Provisional Order to confer on the School Board of Perth additional powers with regard to Sharp's Institution Perth to authorise the transfer to the School Board of Perth of the assets of the Perth Educational Trust to provide for the future administration thereof and for other purposes.	
Local Government Board (Ireland) Provisional Orders Confirmation Act 1917	7 & 8 Geo. 5. c. ix	10 July 1917
An Act to confirm certain Provisional Orders of the Local Government Board for Ireland relating to the King's County and the Rural District of Newry No. 1.
	King's County (Drainage) Order 1917 Provisional Order for altering the Local Government Board (Ireland) Provisional Orders Confirmation (No. 5) Act 1910 (Note: Local Government Board (Ireland) Provisional Orders Confirmation (No. 5) Act 1910 (10 Edw. 7 & 1 Geo. 5. c. lxvi)) and the Local Government Board (Ireland) Provisional Orders Confirmation (No. 2) Act 1911. (Note: Local Government Board (Ireland) Provisional Orders Confirmation (No. 2) Act 1911 (1 & 2 Geo. 5. c. cxxxii))	
	Rathfriland Sewerage Order 1917 Provisional Order to enable the Council of the Rural District of Newry No. 1 to put in force the Compulsory Clauses of the Lands Clauses Acts.	
Lanarkshire County Council (Water, &c.) Order Confirmation Act 1917	7 & 8 Geo. 5. c. x	10 July 1917
An Act to confirm a Provisional Order under the Private Legislation Procedure (Scotland) Act 1899 relating to Lanarkshire County Council (Water &c.).
	Lanarkshire County Council (Water, &c.) Order 1917 Provisional Order to authorise the District Committee of the Middle Ward of the County of Lanark to construct a railway and additional waterworks to include a portion of the county of. Dunbarton within the limits of water supply of the District Committee to confer powers on the County Council and the district committees of the county in relation to the removal disposal and treatment of trade refuse in special drainage districts to provide for the application to the county of certain provisions of the Burgh Police (Scotland) Acts 1892 (Note: Burgh Police (Scotland) Act 1892 (55 & 56 Vict. c. 55)) and 1903 (Note: Burgh Police (Scotland) Act 1903 (3 Edw. 7. c. 33)) to make further provision with regard to the supply of gas within the county and for other purposes.	
Nottinghamshire and Derbyshire Tramways Act 1917 (repealed)	7 & 8 Geo. 5. c. xi	10 July 1917
An Act to transfer to the Nottinghamshire and Derbyshire Tramways Company the tramway undertaking of the mayor aldermen and burgesses of the borough of Ilkeston and for other purposes. (Repealed by Statute Law (Repeals) Act 1995 (c. 44))
Haslemere and District Gas Act 1917	7 & 8 Geo. 5. c. xii	10 July 1917
An Act for incorporating and conferring powers on the Haslemere and District Gas Company.
London Corn Exchange Act 1917 (repealed)	7 & 8 Geo. 5. c. xiii	10 July 1917
An Act to confer further powers upon the London Corn Exchange Company to alter the capital of the Company and for other purposes. (Repealed by Corn Exchange Act 1929 (19 & 20 Geo. 5. c. xv))
Lancashire Power Construction Company Act 1917	7 & 8 Geo. 5. c. xiv	10 July 1917
An Act to rearrange the capital of the Lancashire Power Construction Company Limited and for other purposes.
Hemel Hempstead District Gas Act 1917	7 & 8 Geo. 5. c. xv	10 July 1917
An Act to authorise the Hemel Hempsted District Gas Company to raise additional capital to extend the limits of supply of and to confer further powers upon that Company and for other purposes.
Lea Bridge District Gas Act 1917	7 & 8 Geo. 5. c. xvi	10 July 1917
An Act to authorise the Lea Bridge District Gas Company to raise additional capital to confer further powers upon that Company in connexion with their undertaking and for other purposes.
Gas Light and Coke Company's Act 1917	7 & 8 Geo. 5. c. xvii	10 July 1917
An Act to confer further powers upon the Gas Light and Coke Company.
Kenilworth Gas Act 1917	7 & 8 Geo. 5. c. xviii	10 July 1917
An Act for incorporating and conferring powers on the Kenilworth Gas Company and for other purposes.
Cork Improvement Act 1917	7 & 8 Geo. 5. c. xix	10 July 1917
An Act to confer further powers on the lord mayor aldermen and burgesses of the county borough of Cork and the Cork Harbour Commissioners and for other purposes.
Bristol Waterworks Act 1917	7 & 8 Geo. 5. c. xx	10 July 1917
An Act to authorise the Bristol Waterworks Company to construct new waterworks and for other purposes.
Dundee Harbour and Tay Ferries Order Confirmation Act 1917 (repealed)	7 & 8 Geo. 5. c. xxi	2 August 1917
An Act to confirm a Provisional Order under the Private Legislation Procedure (Scotland) Act 1899 relating to Dundee Harbour and Tay Ferries. (Repealed by Dundee Harbour and Tay Ferries Order Confirmation Act 1952 (15 & 16 Geo. 6 & 1 Eliz. 2. c. xx))
	Dundee Harbour and Tay Ferries Order 1917 Provisional Order to authorise the Trustees of the Harbour of Dundee to borrow additional money and for other purposes.	
Essex and Herts Clergy Charity Scheme Confirmation Act 1917	7 & 8 Geo. 5. c. xxii	2 August 1917
An Act to confirm a Scheme of the Charity Commissioners for the application or management of the Essex and Herts Clergy Charity in the Counties of Essex and Hertford.
	Scheme for the application or management of the Essex and Herts Clergy Charity in the Counties of Essex and Hertford founded by Letters Patent of the 29th April 1747 and comprised in Schemes of the Charity Commissioners of the 15th June 1880 and the 6th January 1882.	
Birmingham Churches Fund Charity Scheme Confirmation Act 1917	7 & 8 Geo. 5. c. xxiii	2 August 1917
An Act to confirm a Scheme of the Charity Commissioners for the application or management of the charity called or known as the Birmingham Churches Fund in the City of Birmingham.
	Scheme for the application or management of the Charity called or known as the Birmingham Churches Fund in the City of Birmingham regulated by the Birmingham Churches Act 1897. (Note: Birmingham Churches Act 1897 (60 & 61 Vict. c. ccxi))	
Church Lands (Bristol St. Thomas) Charity Scheme Confirmation Act 1917	7 & 8 Geo. 5. c. xxiv	2 August 1917
An Act to confirm a Scheme of the Charity Commissioners for the application or management of the Charity known as the Church Lands in the Parish of St. Thomas in the City of Bristol.
	Scheme for the application or management of the Charity known as the Church Lands in the Parish of St. Thomas in the City of Bristol founded by Indenture dated third November 44 Elizabeth.	
Presbyterian Church (Crook) Charity Scheme Confirmation Act 1917	7 & 8 Geo. 5. c. xxv	2 August 1917
An Act to confirm a Scheme of the Charity Commissioners for the application or management of the Charity consisting of the Presbyterian Church in Victoria Street in the ancient township of Crook in the ancient parish of Brancepeth in the county of Durham.
	Scheme for the application or management of the charity consisting of the Presbyterian Church in Victoria Street in the ancient township of Crook in the ancient parish of Brancepeth in the county of Durham comprised in an Indenture dated 1st July 1872.	
Baptist Chapels Scheme Confirmation Act 1917	7 & 8 Geo. 5. c. xxvi	2 August 1917
An Act to confirm a Scheme of the Charity Commissioners for the application or management of certain charities.
	Scheme for the application or management of the following charities.: 1. The charity consisting of the baptist chapel and trust property in the parish of Lamarsh in the county of Essex comprised in the following indenture:—; Indenture dated 11th November 1876.; 2. The charity consisting of the baptist chapel known as the Chalford Tabernacle in the parish of Chalford in the county of Gloucester and of the trust property held in connexion with the said chapel comprised in the following indentures or some or one of them:—; Indentures of lease and release dated respectively 25th and 26th December 1746; Indentures of lease and release dated respectively 1st and 2nd May 1747.; 3. The charity consisting of—; The baptist chapel in the parish of Bures St. Mary in the county of Suffolk comprised in the following indenture:-; Indenture dated 3rd September 1833; The site for a manse in connexion with the said chapel comprised in the following indenture:-; Indenture dated 9th October 1844; The manse in connexion with the said chapel comprised in the following indenture:-; Indenture dated 24th July 1858; The endowment of Mary Wass and others in connexion with the said chapel.	
Congregational Chapels Scheme Confirmation Act 1917	7 & 8 Geo. 5. c. xxvii	2 August 1917
An Act to confirm a Scheme of the Charity Commissioners for the application or management of certain Congregational Chapels Charities.
	Scheme for the application or management of the following Charities:—: 1. The Charity consisting of the Shipley Congregational Chapel and Trust Property at Hill End in the Parish of Claverley in the County of Salop comprised in the following Indentures or some or one of them:—; Indenture dated 7th July 1860; Indenture dated 10th May 1890; Indenture dated 22nd January 1895.; 2. The Charity consisting of the Congregational Chapel and Trust Property at Wall Heath in the Parish of Kingswinford in the County of Stafford comprised in the following Indentures or one of them:—; Indenture dated 1st December 1840; Indenture dated 9th March 1895.; Indenture dated 22nd January 1895.; 3. The Charity called the Ruiton Congregational Chapel and Trust Property in the Parish of Sedgley in the County of Stafford comprised in the following Instruments or some or one of them:—; Indenture dated 6th July 1814; Will of Thomas Darby proved at Lichfield on the 9th October 1863; Indenture dated 21st December 1863; Scheme of Charity Commissioners of the 4th February 1916.; 4. The Charity consisting of the Congregational Chapel and Trust Property in the Parish of Swindon in the County of Stafford comprised in the following Indentures or one of them:—; Indenture dated 15th June 1820; Indenture dated 15th September 1880.; 5. The Charity consisting of the Congregational Chapel and Trust Property at Tettenhall Wood in the Parish of Tettenhall in the County of Stafford comprised in the following Indentures or some or one of them:—; Indenture dated 28th July 1869; Indenture dated 11th November 1870; Another Indenture dated 11th November 1870.; 6. The Charity consisting of the Congregational Chapel and Trust Property at Heath Town in the Borough of Wolverhampton in the County of Stafford comprised in the following Indenture:—; Indenture dated 13th March 1861.; 7. The Charity consisting of the Congregational Chapel and Trust Property in Lower Stafford Street in the said Borough comprised in the following Indentures or one of them:—; Indenture dated 5th September 1890; Indenture dated 24th December 1910.; 8. The Charity consisting of the Congregational Chapel and Trust Property in Queen Street in the said Borough comprised in the following Indentures or some or one of them:—; Indentures of Lease and Release dated respectively 1st and 2nd July 1816; Indenture dated 25th November 1853; Indenture dated 28th September 1864.; 9. The Charity consisting of the Congregational Chapel and Trust Property in York Street in the said Borough comprised in the following Indentures or one of them:—; Indenture dated 19th November 1875; Indenture dated 1st June 1886.; 10. The Charity consisting of the Congregational Chapel and Trust Property in the Parish of Wombourn in the County of Stafford comprised in the following Indentures or some or one of them:—; Indenture dated 10th February 1849; Indenture dated 31st December 1862; Indenture dated 30th September 1903.; 11. The Charity consisting of the Congregational Chapels in the Parish of Farnham in the County of Surrey and of the Trust Property held in connexion therewith which Chapels and Trust Property are comprised in the following Indentures or some or one of them:—; Indenture dated 25th August 1794; Indenture dated 12th March 1835; Indenture dated 4th November 1865; Indenture dated 22nd February 1872; Indenture dated 1st November 1877; Indenture dated 20th December 1902.; 12. The Charity consisting of the Congregational Chapel and Trust Property in Oak Road in the City of Leeds in the West Riding of the County of York comprised in the following Indenture:—; Indenture dated 29th December 1874.; 13. The Charity consisting of the Congregational Chapel and the Congregational Sunday School in the Parish of Mexborough in the West Riding of the County of York which Chapel and School are comprised respectively in the following Indentures:—; Indenture dated 25th August 1864; Indenture dated 29th December 1869.	
Land Drainage (Ewerby) Provisional Order Confirmation Act 1917 (repealed)	7 & 8 Geo. 5. c. xxviii	2 August 1917
An Act to confirm a Provisional Order under the Land Drainage Act 1861 (Note: Land Drainage Act 1861 (24 & 25 Vict. c. 133)) in the matter of a proposed drainage district in the Parish of Ewerby in the County of Lincoln (Kesteven Division). (Repealed by Statute Law (Repeals) Act 1993 (c. 50))
	In the matter of a proposed Drainage District in the Parish of Ewerby in the County of Lincoln (Kesteven Division).	
Land Drainage (Swaffham) Provisional Order Confirmation Act 1917	7 & 8 Geo. 5. c. xxix	2 August 1917
An Act to confirm a Provisional Order under the Land Drainage Act 1914 relating to the Swaffham and Bottisham Drainage District in the County of Cambridge.
	Swaffham and Bottisham Provisional Order 1917 Swaffham and Bottisham Provisional Order.	
Land Drainage (Wistow) Provisional Order Confirmation Act 1917 (repealed)	7 & 8 Geo. 5. c. xxx	2 August 1917
An Act to confirm a Provisional Order under the Land Drainage Act 1861 in the matter of a proposed Drainage District in the parishes of Wistow Cawood and Selby in the West Riding of the County of York. (Repealed by Statute Law (Repeals) Act 1993 (c. 50))
	In the matter of a proposed Drainage District in the parishes of Wistow Cawood and Selby in the West Riding of the County of York.	
Electric Lighting Orders Confirmation Act 1917	7 & 8 Geo. 5. c. xxxi	2 August 1917
An Act to confirm certain Provisional Orders made by the Board of Trade under the Electric Lighting Acts 1882 to 1909 relating to Epsom Rural District (Extension) Featherstone Garforth Horbury Otley Penistone and Rawdon.
	Epsom Rural District Electric Lighting (Extension) Order 1917 Provisional Order granted by the Board of Trade under the Electric Lighting Acts 1882 to 1909 to the South Metropolitan Electric Tramways and Lighting Company Limited in respect of the Parishes of Cuddington and Ewell in the Rural District of Epsom in the County of Surrey.	
	Featherstone Electric Lighting Order 1917 Provisional Order granted by the Board of Trade under the Electric Lighting Acts 1882 to 1909 to the Electrical Distribution of Yorkshire Limited in respect of the Urban District of Featherstone in the West Riding of the County of York.	
	Garforth Electric Lighting Order 1917 Provisional Order granted by the Board of Trade under the Electric Lighting Acts 1882 to 1909 to the Electrical Distribution of Yorkshire Limited in respect of the Urban District of Garforth in the West Riding of the County of York.	
	Horbury Electric Lighting Order 1917 Provisional Order granted by the Board of Trade under the Electric Lighting Acts 1382 to 1909 to the Electrical Distribution of Yorkshire Limited in respect of the Urban District of Horbury in the West Riding of the County York.	
	Otley Electric Lighting Order 1917 Provisional Order granted by the Board of Trade under the Electric Lighting Acts 1882 to 1909 to the Electrical Distribution of Yorkshire Limited in respect of the Urban District of Otley in the West Riding of the County of York.	
	Penistone Electric Lighting Order 1917 Provisional Order granted by the Board of Trade under the Electric Lighting Acts 1882 to 1909 to the Electrical Distribution of Yorkshire Limited in respect of the Urban District of Penistone in the West Riding of the County of York.	
	Rawdon Electric Lighting Order 1917 Provisional Order granted by the Board of Trade under the Electric Lighting Acts 1882 to 1909 to the Electrical Distribution of Yorkshire Limited in respect of the Urban District of Rawdon in the West Riding of the County of York.	
Gas and Water Provisional Orders Act 1917	7 & 8 Geo. 5. c. xxxii	2 August 1917
An Act to confirm certain Provisional Orders made by the Board of Trade under the Gas and Water Works Facilities Act 1870 (Note: Gas and Water Works Facilities Act 1870 (33 & 34 Vict. c. 70)) relating to Stretford Gas Tonbridge Gas and Rickmansworth and Uxbridge Valley Water.
	Stretford Gas Order 1917 Order extending the powers of the Stretford Gas Company for the manufacture and conversion of residual products arising in the manufacture of gas and to amend the Stretford Gas Act 1899. (Note: Stretford Gas Act 1899 (62 & 63 Vict. c. lxxxvii))	
	Tonbridge Gas Order 1917 Order empowering the Tonbridge Gas Company to extend their limits of supply and to raise additional capital and for other purposes.	
	Rickmansworth and Uxbridge Valley Water Order 1917 Order empowering the Rickmansworth and Uxbridge Valley Water Company to extend their limits of supply to raise additional capital and for other purposes.	
Pier and Harbour Orders Confirmation Act 1917	7 & 8 Geo. 5. c. xxxiii	2 August 1917
An Act to confirm certain Provisional Orders made by the Board of Trade under the General Pier and Harbour Act 1861 (Note: General Pier and Harbour Act 1861 (24 & 25 Vict. c. 45)) relating to Brownies Taing and Kircubbin.
	Brownies Taing Pier Order 1917 Order to amend the Brownies Taing Pier Order 1902 in regard to the constitution of the Brownies Taing Pier Trustees and for other purposes.	
	Kircubbin Harbour Order 1917 Order for the management and maintenance of the Harbour of Kircubbin in the County of Down for repealing the Kircubbin Harbour Order 1864 for defining the limits of the Harbour and for other purposes.	
Local Government Board (Ireland) Provisional Order Confirmation (No. 2) Act 1917	7 & 8 Geo. 5. c. xxxiv	2 August 1917
An Act to confirm a certain Provisional Order of the Local Government Board for Ireland relating to the Urban District of Lisburn.
	Lisburn Gas Order 1917 Provisional Order to alter and amend the Lisburn Urban District Council Act 1909. (Note: Lisburn Urban District Council Act 1909 (9 Edw. 7. c. lviii))	
Local Government Board's Provisional Orders Confirmation (No. 1) Act 1917	7 & 8 Geo. 5. c. xxxv	2 August 1917
An Act to confirm certain Provisional Orders of the Local Government Board relating to Brighton Eastbourne Liverpool and Wells-next-the-Sea.
	Brighton Order 1917 Provisional Order for altering the Brighton Corporation Act 1912. (Note: Brighton Corporation Act 1912 (2 & 3 Geo. 5. c. lvii))	
	Eastbourne Order 1917 Provisional Order for partially repealing and altering the Eastbourne Improvement Act 1885. (Note: Eastbourne Improvement Act 1885 (48 & 49 Vict. c. clxv))	
	Liverpool Order 1917 Provisional Order for altering the Liverpool Corporation Act 1913. (Note: Liverpool Corporation Act 1913 (3 & 4 Geo. 5. c. lxxxi))	
	Wells-next-the-Sea Order 1917 Provisional Order for partially repealing and altering the Local Act 7 & 8 Vict. Cap. XСIV. (Note: Wells (Norfolk) Improvement Act 1844 (7 & 8 Vict. c. xciv))	
Local Government Board's Provisional Orders Confirmation (No. 3) Act 1917	7 & 8 Geo. 5. c. xxxvi	2 August 1917
An Act to confirm certain Provisional Orders of the Local Government Board relating to Lowestoft and the Bridport Joint Hospital District.
	Lowestoft Order 1917 Provisional Order for partially repealing and altering the Lowestoft Corporation Act 1901. (Note: Lowestoft Corporation Act 1901 (1 Edw. 7. c. ccxlv))	
	Bridport Joint Hospital Order 1917 Provisional Order for forming a United District under Section 279 of the Public Health Act 1875. (Note: Public Health Act 1875 (38 & 39 Vict. c. 55))	
Bedwas and Machen Urban District Council Act 1917	7 & 8 Geo. 5. c. xxxvii	2 August 1917
An Act to authorise the Urban District Council of Bedwas and Machen to provide and run omnibuses to confer further powers on the Council with respect to the supply of water and for other purposes.
Seaham Harbour Dock Act 1917	7 & 8 Geo. 5. c. xxxviii	2 August 1917
An Act to confer further powers on the Seaham Harbour Dock Company.
London County Council (Money) Act 1917 (repealed)	7 & 8 Geo. 5. c. xxxix	2 August 1917
An Act to regulate the expenditure on capital account and lending of money by the London County Council during the financial period from the first day of April one thousand nine hundred and seventeen to the thirtieth day of September one thousand nine hundred and eighteen and for other purposes. (Repealed by London County Council (Loans) Act 1955 (4 & 5 Eliz. 2. c. xxvi))
Ebbw Vale Urban District Council Act 1917	7 & 8 Geo. 5. c. xl	2 August 1917
An Act to confer further powers on the Urban District Council of Ebbw Vale in regard to their water and electricity undertakings to authorise the Council to provide and run omnibuses and to make further provision for the improvement health and good government of the district and for other purposes.
Barrow-in-Furness Corporation Water Act 1917	7 & 8 Geo. 5. c. xli	2 August 1917
An Act to amend the Barrow-in-Furness Corporation Act 1901. (Note: Barrow-in-Furness Corporation Act 1901 (1 Edw. 7. c. ccxviii))
Ashton-under-Lyne Corporation Act 1917	7 & 8 Geo. 5. c. xlii	2 August 1917
An Act to confer further powers upon the mayor aldermen and burgesses of the borough of Ashton-under-Lyne with regard to their tramway and electricity undertakings to make further provision with reference to the purchase of the undertaking authorised by the Oldham Ashton-under-Lyne Hyde and District Electric Tramways Order 1896 and for other purposes.
North Cheshire Water Act 1917	7 & 8 Geo. 5. c. xliii	2 August 1917
An Act to confer further powers upon the North Cheshire Water Company and for other purposes.
Port of London Act 1917	7 & 8 Geo. 5. c. xliv	2 August 1917
An Act to authorise the Port of London Authority to construct further works for the improvement of the Port of London and for other purposes.
Chepstow Water Act 1917	7 & 8 Geo. 5. c. xlv	2 August 1917
An Act to confer powers on the Chepstow Water Company and for other purposes.
Sheffield Gas Act 1917 (repealed)	7 & 8 Geo. 5. c. xlvi	2 August 1917
An Act to provide for the conversion of the existing capital of the Sheffield United Gaslight Company and to authorise them to raise additional capital to change the name of the Company and for other purposes. (Repealed by Sheffield Gas (Consolidation) 1929 (19 & 20 Geo. 5. c. xii))
Sheffield Corporation Act 1917 (repealed)	7 & 8 Geo. 5. c. xlvii	2 August 1917
An Act to authorise the Corporation of the city of Sheffield to construct a generating station and other works in connexion with their electricity undertaking and for other purposes. (Repealed by Sheffield Corporation (Consolidation) Act 1918 (8 & 9 Geo. 5. c. lxi))
Colonial Bank Act 1917 (repealed)	7 & 8 Geo. 5. c. xlviii	2 August 1917
An Act for granting additional powers to the Colonial Bank. (Repealed by Colonial Bank Act 1925 (15 & 16 Geo. 5. c. cvi))
Caerphilly Urban District Council Act 1917	7 & 8 Geo. 5. c. xlix	2 August 1917
An Act to authorise the Urban District Council of Caerphilly to provide and run omnibuses and for other purposes.
South Eastern and London, Chatham and Dover Railways Act 1917	7 & 8 Geo. 5. c. l	2 August 1917
An Act to empower the South Eastern Railway Company to alter and strengthen part of the Charing Cross Railway Bridge and for other purposes.
Richmond (Surrey) Electricity Supply Act 1917	7 & 8 Geo. 5. c. li	21 August 1917
An Act to confirm an agreement relating to the supply of electricity in the borough of Richmond (Surrey).
Blackpool Improvement Act 1917	7 & 8 Geo. 5. c. lii	21 August 1917
An Act to alter the boundaries of the borough of Blackpool to empower the mayor aldermen and burgesses of that borough to construct additional promenades street improvements tramways and other works and for other purposes.
Sir W. G. Armstrong Whitworth and Company Limited (Railways) Act 1917	7 & 8 Geo. 5. c. liii	21 August 1917
An Act to authorise Sir W. G. Armstrong Whitworth and Company Limited to construct a branch railway in the city of Manchester and to provide for the conveyance of traffic between the works of the Company in the said city and the Lancashire and Yorkshire Railway.
Levinstein Limited (Railways) Act 1917	7 & 8 Geo. 5. c. liv	21 August 1917
An Act to authorise the construction by Levinstein Limited of a branch railway in the city of Manchester for the conveyance of traffic between their works and the Lancashire and Yorkshire Railway and for other purposes.
Cheshire Lines Act 1917	7 & 8 Geo. 5. c. lv	21 August 1917
An Act to amend the provisions of the Manchester Corporation Act 1911 (Note: Manchester Corporation Act 1911 (1 & 2 Geo. 5. c. cviii)) for the protection of the Cheshire Lines Committee and for other purposes.
Royal Victoria Infirmary Newcastle-upon-Tyne Act 1917 (repealed)	7 & 8 Geo. 5. c. lvi	21 August 1917
An Act to empower the lord mayor aldermen and citizens of the city and county of Newcastle-upon-Tyne to convey to trustees for the Royal Victoria Infirmary at Newcastle-upon-Tyne for the sick and lame poor of the said city and county and of the counties of Northumberland and Durham a portion of the Castle Leazes for an extension of the said infirmary and for other purposes. (Repealed by Newcastle-upon-Tyne Town Moor Act 1988 (c. xxxi))
Local Government Board's Provisional Orders Confirmation (No. 2) Act 1917	7 & 8 Geo. 5. c. lvii	21 August 1917
An Act to confirm certain Provisional Orders of the Local Government Board relating to Bognor Carlisle Lytham Swansea Watford the Ormside Joint Hospital District and the District of the Aspatria Silloth and District Joint Water Board.
	Bognor Order 1917 Provisional Order for partially repealing the Local Acts 3 Geo. IV. cap. lvii., (Note: Bognor Market and Roads Act 1822 (3 Geo. 4. c. lvii)) 6 Geo. IV. саp. сxxxv., (Note: Bognor Improvement and Market Act 1825 (6 Geo. 4. с. сxxxv)) and 5 & 6 Wm. IV. cap. ci. (Note: Bognor Improvement Act 1835 (5 & 6 Will. 4. c. ci)) and the Confirming Act 34 & 35 Vict. cap. clxxxvii. (Note: Local Government Supplemental Act 1871 (No. 4) (34 & 35 Vict. c. clxxxvii))	
	Carlisle Order 1917 Provisional Order for altering the Carlisle Corporation Act 1887. (Note: Carlisle Corporation Act 1887 (50 & 51 Vict. c. xix))	
	Lytham Order 1917 Provisional Order for altering the Lytham Improvement Act 1847 (Note: Lytham Improvement Act 1847 (10 & 11 Vict. c. ccli)) the Lytham Improvement Act 1904 (Note: Lytham Improvement Act 1904 (4 Edw. 7. c. clv)) and a Confirming Act. (Note: Local Government Board's Provisional Orders Confirmation (No. 5) Act 1901 (1 Edw. 7. c. cxlvii))	
	Swansea Order 1917 Provisional Order for partially repealing and altering certain Local Acts and Confirming Acts.	
	Watford Order 1917 Provisional Order for altering the Watford Urban District Council Act 1909. (Note: Watford Urban District Council Act 1909 (9 Edw. 7. c. lxxxviii))	
	Ormside Joint Hospital Order 1917 Provisional Order for forming a United District under Section 279 of the Public Health Act 1875.	
	Aspatria Silloth and District Order 1917 Provisional Order for altering the Aspatria Silloth and District Water Act 1901. (Note: Aspatria Silloth and District Water Act 1901 (1 Edw. 7. c. lvii))	
Glasgow Boundaries Act 1912 (Amendment) Order Confirmation Act 1917	7 & 8 Geo. 5. c. lviii	21 August 1917
An Act to confirm a Provisional Order under the Private Legislation Procedure (Scotland) Act 1899 relating to Glasgow Boundaries.
	Glasgow Boundaries Act 1912 (Amendment) Order 1917 Provisional Order to extend the time limited by the Glasgow Boundaries Act 1912 (Note: Glasgow Boundaries Act 1912 (2 & 3 Geo. 5. c. xcv)) for the re-division of the City and Royal Burgh of Glasgow into wards and for the election of town councillors for such wards and for other purposes.	
South Staffordshire Mond Gas (Power and Heating) Company's (No. 2) Act 1917	7 & 8 Geo. 5. c. lix	20 December 1917
An Act to confer further borrowing powers upon the South Staffordshire Mond Gas (Power and Heating) Company.

=== Private and personal acts ===
Short title	Citation	Royal assent
Long title
Boaz' Divorce Act 1917 (Note: This act was not printed by the King's Printer)	7 & 8 Geo. 5. c. 1 Pr.	2 August 1917
An Act to dissolve the marriage of William Robert Boaz with Florence Elizabeth Boaz his now wife and to enable him to marry again and for other purposes.
Martin's Divorce Act 1917	7 & 8 Geo. 5. c. 2 Pr.	21 August 1917
An Act to dissolve the marriage of Nita Martin of 1 Lincoln Place Merrion Square in the City of Dublin with Thomas Ernest Martin her husband and to enable her to marry again and for other purposes.
Parker's Divorce Act 1917	7 & 8 Geo. 5. c. 3 Pr.	20 December 1917
An Act to dissolve the marriage of Lilian Margaret Aurora Parker of 191 Lauderdale Mansions Maida Vale London with James Matthew Marmaduke Parker her husband and to enable her to marry again and for other purposes.

=== Sources ===
- 7 & 8 George V - 1917-8 – via HathiTrust.
- Journals of the House of Commons (PDF). Vol. 172 (February 1917 - February 1918) – via parliament.uk.

== See also ==
- List of acts of the Parliament of the United Kingdom
