= Police, Factories, & c. (Miscellaneous Provisions) Act 1916 =

Act of the Parliament of the United Kingdom

Police, Factories, & c. (Miscellaneous Provisions) Act 1916 (Note: Section 13.)
- Act of Parliament
- Parliament of the United Kingdom
- Long title: An Act to amend the Enactments relating to the Police and certain other Enactments with the administration of which the Secretary of State for the Home Department is concerned.
- Citation: 6 & 7 Geo. 5. c. 31
- Territorial extent: United Kingdom

Dates
- Royal assent: 3 August 1916
- Commencement: 3 August 1916 (Note: The Acts of Parliament (Commencement) Act 1793.)
Other legislation
Amends	Factory and Workshop Act 1901; Notice of Accidents Act 1906
Amended by	Police (Pensions) Act 1918; Statute Law Revision Act 1927; Local Government Act 1929; Factories Act 1937; Mines and Quarries Act 1954; Mental Health Act 1959; Criminal Justice Act 1948; Local Government Act 1972; Statute Law (Repeals) Act 1973; Civic Government (Scotland) Act 1982; Criminal Justice Act 1982; Police Reform and Social Responsibility Act 2011

Status: Amended

Text of statute as originally enacted

Text of the Police, Factories, & c. (Miscellaneous Provisions) Act 1916 as in force today (including any amendments) within the United Kingdom, from legislation.gov.uk.

The Police, Factories, & c. (Miscellaneous Provisions) Act 1916 (6 & 7 Geo. 5. c. 31) is an act of the Parliament of the United Kingdom. It had numerous provisions including in particular occupational health and safety, with special focus on regulations for factories and coalmines. It also enacted rules for the regulation of street trading and street collections.

Although the act has been substantially amended from its initial passage in 1916, with many parts repealed by subsequent legislation, the parts of the act relating to street collections are still in force in the UK. In July 2025, directors of the company We R Blighty pled guilty to offences under the act.

The act enables local authorities to regulate fundraising for charitable and other purposes.

== Republic of Ireland ==
At the time of the passage of the act, the whole of Ireland was part of the United Kingdom, and the act was adopted into the statute law of the Republic of Ireland as part of Irish independence. The act remained part of Irish statute law until 1983, when it was repealed by the Statute Law Revision Act 1983.

== Subsequent developments ==
Section 10 of the act was repealed for England and Wales and Scotland by section 189 of, and the fifth schedule to, the Mines and Quarries Act 1954 (2 & 3 Eliz. 2. c. 70), which came into force on 1 January 1957.

Section 3 of the act was repealed by section 1(1) of, and part XIII of schedule 1 to, the Statute Law (Repeals) Act 1973, which came into force on 18 July 1973.

Westminster City Council has criticised the act for not giving licensing authorities the powers to effectively enforce against illegal activity.
