= Elections and Registration Act 1915 =

Act of the Parliament of the United Kingdom

Elections and Registration Act 1915 (Note: Section 5.)
- Act of Parliament
- Parliament of the United Kingdom
- Long title: An Act to postpone Elections of local authorities and other bodies and the preparation of the Parliamentary and Local Government Registers, and for purposes incidental thereto.
- Citation: 5 & 6 Geo. 5. c. 76
- Introduced by: Walter Long
- Territorial extent: United Kingdom

Dates
- Royal assent: 29 July 1915
- Commencement: 29 July 1915 (Note: The Acts of Parliament (Commencement) Act 1793.)
- Repealed: 22 December 1927
Other legislation
Amended by	Local Government (Emergency Provisions) Act 1916
Repealed by	Statute Law Revision Act 1927
Relates to	Parliament and Local Elections Act 1916; Parliament and Local Elections Act 1917; Parliament and Local Elections (No. 2) Act 1917; Parliament and Local Elections Act 1918

Status: Repealed

Text of statute as originally enacted

The Elections and Registration Act 1915 (5 & 6 Geo. 5. c. 76) was an act of the Parliament of the United Kingdom, passed during war time, that postponed local elections and the preparation of registers of electors. Initially the postponement was for one year, but the Act was renewed annually until the electoral cycle was resumed in 1919 following the cessation of hostilities.

== Background ==
Elections to local authorities in the United Kingdom were held annually in either April or November. In August 1914 war broke out, although this did not initially effect the municipal elections which were duly held in November 1914 and April 1915.

A coalition government was formed in May 1915, and in June it was announced that the cabinet intended to introduce legislation to both extend the life of Parliament by a year to 1917, and also to postpone the November 1915 borough elections. The postponement of elections would also mean that local authorities would not need to compile new electoral registers.

The Elections and Registration Bill was duly introduced to the Commons only 22 July. The bill passed all stages in both houses rapidly, and received royal assent on 29 July.

== Provisions ==
The act was a short document containing only four sections.

- Section 1 provided that the
  next statutory elections of county and borough councillors, district councillors, guardians, and parish councillors, shall be postponed for a year, and the term of office of the existing councillors and guardians shall accordingly be extended by one year.
  Elections were no longer to be required to fill casual vacancies occurring in the membership of local councils and boards. Instead a vacant seat was to "be filled by means of the choice by the council or board of a person", and "a councillor or guardian so chosen shall hold office in the same manner in all respects as if he had been elected to fill the vacancy".
- Section 2 exempted the Common Council of the City of London from the Act.
- Section 3 provided that the parliamentary and local government register of electors in force at the time of the passing of the Act should remain in force until 31 December 1916.
- Section 4 dealt with the application of the Act to Scotland and Ireland.

== Renewal ==
Parliament and Local Elections Act 1916
- Act of Parliament
- Parliament of the United Kingdom
- Long title: An Act to amend the Parliament and Registration Act, 1916; and to extend the Elections and Registration Act, 1915, with respect to elections of local authorities and other bodies, and the revision of jurors' lists in Ireland.
- Citation: 6 & 7 Geo. 5. c. 44
- Territorial extent: United Kingdom

Dates
- Royal assent: 23 August 1916
- Commencement: 23 August 1916
- Repealed: 22 December 1927
Other legislation
Amends	Parliament and Registration Act 1916
Amended by	Parliament and Local Elections Act 1917
Repealed by	Statute Law Revision Act 1927
Relates to	Parliament and Local Elections (No. 2) Act 1917; Parliament and Local Elections Act 1918

Status: Repealed

Text of statute as originally enacted

Parliament and Local Elections Act 1917 (Note: Section 3.)
- Act of Parliament
- Parliament of the United Kingdom
- Long title: An Act to amend and extend the Parliament and Local Elections Act, 1916.
- Citation: 7 & 8 Geo. 5. c. 13
- Territorial extent: United Kingdom

Dates
- Royal assent: 26 April 1917
- Commencement: 26 April 1917
- Repealed: 22 December 1927
Other legislation
Amends	Parliament and Local Elections Act 1916
Repealed by	Parliament and Local Elections (No. 2) Act 1917; Statute Law Revision Act 1927
Relates to	Parliament and Local Elections Act 1918

Status: Repealed

Text of statute as originally enacted

Parliament and Local Elections (No. 2) Act 1917
- Act of Parliament
- Parliament of the United Kingdom
- Long title: An Act to make further provision for the prolongation of the present Parliament, and the postponement of Local Elections.
- Citation: 7 & 8 Geo. 5. c. 50
- Territorial extent: United Kingdom

Dates
- Royal assent: 29 November 1917
- Commencement: 29 November 1917
- Repealed: 22 December 1927
Other legislation
Amends	Parliament and Local Elections Act 1917
Repealed by	Parliament and Local Elections Act 1918; Statute Law Revision Act 1927

Status: Repealed

Text of statute as originally enacted

With the continuation of the war until November 1918, the provisions of the 1915 legislation had to be renewed on three occasions by the Parliament and Local Elections Act 1916 (6 & 7 Geo. 5. c. 44), Parliament and Local Elections Act 1917 (7 & 8 Geo. 5. c. 13) and the Parliament and Local Elections (No. 2) Act 1917 (7 & 8 Geo. 5. c. 50).

== See also ==
- Local Elections and Register of Electors (Temporary Provisions) Act 1939, similar legislation operative for the duration of World War II
- Coronavirus Act 2020 sections 59 to 70, which similarly suspended elections for a year during the COVID-19 pandemic
