= We R Blighty =

British community interest company

We R Blighty is a United Kingdom community interest company founded in 2022, that as of 2025 conducts street collections that it claims are to raise money for homeless ex-soldiers. "Blighty" is a British English slang term for Great Britain, or often specifically England.

It has been the subject of numerous news stories regarding the possible illegitimacy of its activities. The company states that donations are split 50:50 between the company's operators and homeless soldiers.

In June 2025, the City of London reported that two of We R Blighty's directors had pleaded guilty to multiple offences under the Police, Factories, & c. (Miscellaneous Provisions) Act 1916 (6 & 7 Geo. 5. c. 31) in regard to unlicensed street collections.
