= List of acts of the Parliament of the United Kingdom from 1916 =

This is a complete list of acts of the Parliament of the United Kingdom for the year 1916.

Note that the first parliament of the United Kingdom was held in 1801; parliaments between 1707 and 1800 were either parliaments of Great Britain or of Ireland). For acts passed up until 1707, see the list of acts of the Parliament of England and the list of acts of the Parliament of Scotland. For acts passed from 1707 to 1800, see the list of acts of the Parliament of Great Britain. See also the list of acts of the Parliament of Ireland.

For acts of the devolved parliaments and assemblies in the United Kingdom, see the list of acts of the Scottish Parliament, the list of acts of the Northern Ireland Assembly, and the list of acts and measures of Senedd Cymru; see also the list of acts of the Parliament of Northern Ireland.

The number shown after each act's title is its chapter number. Acts passed before 1963 are cited using this number, preceded by the year(s) of the reign during which the relevant parliamentary session was held; thus the Union with Ireland Act 1800 is cited as "39 & 40 Geo. 3 c. 67", meaning the 67th act passed during the session that started in the 39th year of the reign of George III and which finished in the 40th year of that reign. Note that the modern convention is to use Arabic numerals in citations (thus "41 Geo. 3" rather than "41 Geo. III"). Acts of the last session of the Parliament of Great Britain and the first session of the Parliament of the United Kingdom are both cited as "41 Geo. 3". Acts passed from 1963 onwards are simply cited by calendar year and chapter number.

== 5 & 6 Geo. 5 ==
Continuing the fifth session of the 30th Parliament of the United Kingdom, which met from 11 November 1914 until 27 January 1916.

This session was also traditionally cited as 5 & 6 G. 5.

=== Public general acts ===
Short title	Citation	Royal assent
Long title
Munitions of War (Amendment) Act 1916 (repealed)	5 & 6 Geo. 5. c. 99	27 January 1916
An Act to amend the Munitions of War Act, 1915. (Note: Munitions of War Act 1915 (5 & 6 Geo. 5. c. 54)) (Repealed by Statute Law Revision Act 1927 (17 & 18 Geo. 5. c. 42))
Parliament and Registration Act 1916 (repealed)	5 & 6 Geo. 5. c. 100	27 January 1916
An Act to amend the Parliament Act, 1911, (Note: Parliament Act 1911 (1 & 2 Geo. 5. c. 13)) in connection with the present Parliament, and to suspend further the machinery for the registration of Electors. (Repealed by Statute Law Revision Act 1927 (17 & 18 Geo. 5. c. 42))
Naval Forces (Service on Shore) Act 1916 (repealed)	5 & 6 Geo. 5. c. 101	27 January 1916
An Act to provide for placing certain Officers and Men of His Majesty's naval forces under Military Law whilst serving on Shore. (Repealed by Statute Law Revision Act 1927 (17 & 18 Geo. 5. c. 42))
Customs (War Powers) Act 1916 (repealed)	5 & 6 Geo. 5. c. 102	27 January 1916
An Act to amend the Customs (War Powers) Acts, 1915. (Note: Customs (War Powers) Act 1915 (5 & 6 Geo. 5. c. 31)) (Note: Customs (War Powers) (No. 2) Act 1915 (5 & 6 Geo. 5. c. 71)) (Repealed by Statute Law Revision Act 1927 (17 & 18 Geo. 5. c. 42))
Army (Suspension of Sentences) Amendment Act 1916 (repealed)	5 & 6 Geo. 5. c. 103	27 January 1916
An Act to amend the Army (Suspension of Sentences) Act, 1915. (Note: Army (Suspension of Sentences) Act 1915 (5 & 6 Geo. 5. c. 23)) (Repealed by Army and Air Force (Annual) Act 1920 (10 & 11 Geo. 5. c. 7))
Military Service Act 1916 (repealed)	5 & 6 Geo. 5. c. 104	27 January 1916
An Act to make provision with respect to Military Service in connexion with the present War. (Repealed by Statute Law Revision Act 1927 (17 & 18 Geo. 5. c. 42))
Trading with the Enemy Amendment Act 1916 (repealed)	5 & 6 Geo. 5. c. 105	27 January 1916
An Act to amend the Trading with the Enemy Acts. (Repealed by Trading with the Enemy Act 1939 (2 & 3 Geo. 6. c. 89))

=== Sources ===
- 5 & 6 George V - 1914-6 – via HathiTrust.

== 6 & 7 Geo. 5 ==
The sixth session of the 30th Parliament of the United Kingdom, which met from 15 February 1916 until 22 December 1916.

This session was also traditionally cited as 6 & 7 G. 5.

=== Public general acts ===
Short title	Citation	Royal assent
Long title
Consolidated Fund (No. 1) Act 1916 (repealed)	6 & 7 Geo. 5. c. 1	2 March 1916
An Act to apply certain sums out of the Consolidated Fund to the service of the years ending on the thirty-first day of March one thousand nine hundred and sixteen and one thousand nine hundred and seventeen. (Repealed by Statute Law Revision Act 1927 (17 & 18 Geo. 5. c. 42))
Naval Prize (Procedure) Act 1916	6 & 7 Geo. 5. c. 2	2 March 1916
An Act to amend the Law as to the Jurisdiction of Prize Courts in the case of proceedings against persons in His Majesty's Naval Service or in the employment of the Admiralty, and as to the transfer of Proceedings in Prize.
Consolidated Fund (No. 2) Act 1916 (repealed)	6 & 7 Geo. 5. c. 3	30 March 1916
An Act to apply certain sums out of the Consolidated Fund to the service of the years ending on the thirty-first day of March one thousand nine hundred and sixteen and one thousand nine hundred and seventeen. (Repealed by Statute Law Revision Act 1927 (17 & 18 Geo. 5. c. 42))
Naval and Military War Pensions, &c. (Expenses) Act 1916 (repealed)	6 & 7 Geo. 5. c. 4	30 March 1916
An Act to provide for the payment of a grant in aid of the funds at the disposal of the Statutory Committee constituted under the Naval and Military War Pensions, &c. Act, 1915, (Note: Naval and Military War Pensions, &c. Act 1915 (5 & 6 Geo. 5. c. 83)) and for payments by local authorities in aid of the expenses of local and district committees under that Act. (Repealed by Naval and Military War Pensions, &c. (Administrative Expenses) Act 1917 (7 & 8 Geo. 5. c. 14) and Naval and Military War Pensions, &c. (Transfer of Powers) Act 1917 (7 & 8 Geo. 5. c. 37))
Army (Annual) Act 1916 (repealed)	6 & 7 Geo. 5. c. 5	19 April 1916
An Act to provide, during Twelve Months, for the Discipline and Regulation of the Army. (Repealed by Statute Law Revision Act 1927 (17 & 18 Geo. 5. c. 42))
War Risks (Insurance by Trustees) Act 1916 (repealed)	6 & 7 Geo. 5. c. 6	19 April 1916
An Act to facilitate the Insurance against War Risks of Property subject to Trusts. (Repealed by Statute Law Revision Act 1927 (17 & 18 Geo. 5. c. 42))
Marriage (Scotland) Act 1916 (repealed)	6 & 7 Geo. 5. c. 7	19 April 1916
An Act to amend the Law relating to the registration of irregular marriages in Scotland, and to amend during the continuance of the present War the Marriage Notice (Scotland) Act, 1878, (Note: Marriage Notice (Scotland) Act 1878 (41 & 42 Vict. c. 43)) so far as applying to persons serving in the Naval and Military forces of the Crown. (Repealed by Marriage (Scotland) Act 1939 (2 & 3 Geo. 6. c. 34))
Imperial Institute (Management) Act 1916 (repealed)	6 & 7 Geo. 5. c. 8	19 April 1916
An Act to provide for transferring the Management of the Imperial Institute from the Board of Trade to the Colonial Office, and for other purposes connected therewith. (Repealed by Imperial Institute Act 1925 (15 & 16 Geo. 5. c. xvii))
Pacific Islands Regulations (Validation) Act 1916 (repealed)	6 & 7 Geo. 5. c. 9	19 April 1916
An Act to validate certain King's Regulations made under the Pacific Order in Council, 1893. (Repealed by Statute Law (Repeals) Act 1986 (c. 12))
Education (Provision of Meals) (Ireland) Act 1916 (repealed)	6 & 7 Geo. 5. c. 10	19 April 1916
An Act to amend the Education (Provision of Meals) (Ireland) Act, 1914. (Note: Education (Provision of Meals) (Ireland) Act 1914 (4 & 5 Geo. 5. c. 35)) (Repealed by Education Act (Northern Ireland) 1923 (13 & 14 Geo. 5. c. 21 (N.I.)))
Finance (New Duties) Act 1916 (repealed)	6 & 7 Geo. 5. c. 11	19 April 1916
An Act to impose Duties in respect of admission to Entertainments, Matches, Table Waters and other Beverages, and Cider; and for purposes connected therewith. (Repealed for England and Wales and Scotland by Entertainments Duty Act 1958 (6 & 7 Eliz. 2. c. 9) and for Northern Ireland by Statute Law Revision Act 1953 (2 & 3 Eliz. 2. c. 5))
Local Government (Emergency Provisions) Act 1916	6 & 7 Geo. 5. c. 12	17 May 1916
An Act to make provision with respect to Officers and Servants of Local Authorities serving in or with His Majesty's Forces and to make various administrative provisions with a view to economy in money and labour in connection with the present War.
Courts (Emergency Powers) (Amendment) Act 1916 (repealed)	6 & 7 Geo. 5. c. 13	17 May 1916
An Act to amend the Courts (Emergency Powers) Act, 1914, (Note: Courts (Emergency Powers) Act 1914 (4 & 5 Geo. 5. c. 78)) in relation to officers and men of His Majesty's forces. (Repealed by Statute Law (Repeals) Act 1976 (c. 16))
Summer Time Act 1916 (repealed)	6 & 7 Geo. 5. c. 14	17 May 1916
An Act to provide for the Time in Great Britain and Ireland being in advance of Greenwich and Dublin mean time respectively in the summer months. (Repealed by Time (Ireland) Act 1916 (6 & 7 Geo. 5. c. 45) and Statute Law Revision Act 1927 (17 & 18 Geo. 5. c. 42))
Military Service Act 1916 (Session 2) or the Military Service (No. 2) Act 1916 (repealed)	6 & 7 Geo. 5. c. 15	25 May 1916
An Act to make further provision with respect to Military Service during the present War. (Repealed by Statute Law Revision Act 1927 (17 & 18 Geo. 5. c. 42))
Consolidated Fund (No. 3) Act 1916 (repealed)	6 & 7 Geo. 5. c. 16	1 June 1916
An Act to apply a sum out of the Consolidated Fund to the service of the year ending on the thirty-first day of March one thousand nine hundred and seventeen. (Repealed by Statute Law Revision Act 1927 (17 & 18 Geo. 5. c. 42))
Naval Discipline (Delegation of Powers) Act 1916 (repealed)	6 & 7 Geo. 5. c. 17	1 June 1916
An Act to amend the Naval Discipline Act (Note: Naval Discipline Act 1864 (27 & 28 Vict. c. 119)) with respect to the powers and duties of the Commander-in-Chief of the Grand Fleet during the present War. (Repealed by Statute Law Revision Act 1927 (17 & 18 Geo. 5. c. 42))
Courts (Emergency Powers) (No. 2) Act 1916 (repealed)	6 & 7 Geo. 5. c. 18	1 June 1916
An Act to give to courts in connection with the present war further powers of granting relief. (Repealed by Statute Law Revision Act 1927 (17 & 18 Geo. 5. c. 42) and Statute Law (Repeals) Act 1976 (c. 16))
British North America Act 1916 (repealed)	6 & 7 Geo. 5. c. 19	1 June 1916
An Act to amend the British North America Act, 1867. (Note: British North America Act 1867 (30 & 31 Vict. c. 3)) (Repealed by Statute Law Revision Act 1927 (17 & 18 Geo. 5. c. 42))
National Insurance (Part II.) (Munition Workers) Act 1916 (repealed)	6 & 7 Geo. 5. c. 20	19 July 1916
An Act to extend the provisions of the National Insurance Act, 1911, (Note: National Insurance Act 1911 (1 & 2 Geo. 5. c. 55)) relating to unemployment insurance to certain trades and employments in connection with the present war. (Repealed by Unemployment Insurance Act 1920 (10 & 11 Geo. 5. c. 30))
Marriage of British Subjects (Facilities) Amendment Act 1916	6 & 7 Geo. 5. c. 21	19 July 1916
An Act to amend the Marriage of British Subjects (Facilities) Act, 1915. (Note: Marriage of British Subjects (Facilities) Act 1915 (5 & 6 Geo. 5. c. 40)) (Repealed for Scotland by Marriage (Scotland) Act 1977 (c. 15))
Re-election of Ministers Act 1916 (repealed)	6 & 7 Geo. 5. c. 22	19 July 1916
An Act to make temporary provision rendering unnecessary the re-election of Members of the House of Commons on acceptance of certain Offices. (Repealed by Statute Law Revision Act 1927 (17 & 18 Geo. 5. c. 42))
Royal Marines Act 1916 (repealed)	6 & 7 Geo. 5. c. 23	19 July 1916
An Act to extend further the term of service of the Royal Marine Force during the present War. (Repealed by Statute Law Revision Act 1927 (17 & 18 Geo. 5. c. 42))
Finance Act 1916	6 & 7 Geo. 5. c. 24	19 July 1916
An Act to grant certain duties of Customs and Inland Revenue (including Excise), to alter other duties, and to amend the Law relating to Customs and Inland Revenue (including Excise) and the National Debt, and to make further provision in connexion with Finance.
Gas (Standard of Calorific Power) Act 1916 (repealed)	6 & 7 Geo. 5. c. 25	3 August 1916
An Act to authorise as respects gas undertakings the substitution of a standard of calorific power for a standard of illuminating power. (Repealed by Gas Act 1948 (11 & 12 Geo. 6. c. 67))
Output of Beer (Restriction) Act 1916 (repealed)	6 & 7 Geo. 5. c. 26	3 August 1916
An Act to put temporary restrictions on the Output of Beer. (Repealed by Statute Law Revision Act 1927 (17 & 18 Geo. 5. c. 42))
Isle of Man (Customs) Act 1916 (repealed)	6 & 7 Geo. 5. c. 27	3 August 1916
An Act to amend the Law with respect to Customs Duties in the Isle of Man. (Repealed by Isle of Man (Customs) Act 1919 (9 & 10 Geo. 5. c. 74) and Statute Law Revision Act 1927 (17 & 18 Geo. 5. c. 42))
Public Works Loans Act 1916 (repealed)	6 & 7 Geo. 5. c. 28	3 August 1916
An Act to grant Money for the purpose of certain Local Loans out of the Local Loans Fund, and for other purposes relating to Local Loans. (Repealed by Statute Law Revision Act 1927 (17 & 18 Geo. 5. c. 42))
Expiring Laws Continuance Act 1916 (repealed)	6 & 7 Geo. 5. c. 29	3 August 1916
An Act to continue various Expiring Laws. (Repealed by Statute Law Revision Act 1927 (17 & 18 Geo. 5. c. 42))
Consolidated Fund (No. 4) Act 1916 (repealed)	6 & 7 Geo. 5. c. 30	3 August 1916
An Act to apply a sum out of the Consolidated Fund to the service of the year ending on the thirty-first day of March one thousand nine hundred and seventeen. (Repealed by Statute Law Revision Act 1927 (17 & 18 Geo. 5. c. 42))
Police, Factories, & c. (Miscellaneous Provisions) Act 1916	6 & 7 Geo. 5. c. 31	3 August 1916
An Act to amend the Enactments relating to the Police and certain other Enactments with the administration of which the Secretary of State for the Home Department is concerned.
Trading with the Enemy (Copyright) Act 1916 (repealed)	6 & 7 Geo. 5. c. 32	10 August 1916
An Act to make provision with respect to Copyright in works first published or made in an enemy country during the present War. (Repealed by Trading with the Enemy Act 1939 (2 & 3 Geo. 6. c. 89))
Army (Courts of Inquiry) Act 1916 (repealed)	6 & 7 Geo. 5. c. 33	10 August 1916
An Act to amend subsection five of section seventy of the Army Act. (Note: Army Act 1881 (44 & 45 Vict. c. 58)) (Repealed by Statute Law Revision Act 1927 (17 & 18 Geo. 5. c. 42))
Special Commissions (Dardanelles and Mesopotamia) Act 1916 (repealed)	6 & 7 Geo. 5. c. 34	17 August 1916
An Act to constitute Special Commissions to inquire into the origin, inception, and conduct of Operations of War in the Dardanelles and Gallipoli, and into the origin, inception, and conduct of Operations of War in Mesopotamia. (Repealed by Statute Law Revision Act 1927 (17 & 18 Geo. 5. c. 42))
Elementary Education (Fee Grant) Act 1916 (repealed)	6 & 7 Geo. 5. c. 35	17 August 1916
An Act to alter the Limitation on the Ages of Children in respect of whom a Fee Grant is payable. (Repealed by Education Act 1918 (8 & 9 Geo. 5. c. 39))
Finance (Exchequer Bonds) Amendment Act 1916 (repealed)	6 & 7 Geo. 5. c. 36	17 August 1916
An Act to amend section fifty-eight of the Finance Act, 1916, (Note: Finance Act 1916 (6 & 7 Geo. 5. c. 24)) with respect to the issue of certain Exchequer Bonds. (Repealed by Statute Law Revision Act 1927 (17 & 18 Geo. 5. c. 42))
Government of India (Amendment) Act 1916 (repealed)	6 & 7 Geo. 5. c. 37	23 August 1916
An Act to amend certain enactments relating to the government of India, and to remove doubts as to the validity of certain Orders in Council made for India. (Repealed by Statute Law (Repeals) Act 1993 (c. 50))
Small Holding Colonies Act 1916 (repealed)	6 & 7 Geo. 5. c. 38	23 August 1916
An Act to provide for the acquisition and management of land by the State for experimental Small Holding Colonies, and to extend the powers of acquisition and management of land by certain Government Departments under the Development and Road Improvement Funds Act, 1909, (Note: Development and Road Improvement Funds Act 1909 (9 Edw. 7. c. 47)) and for other purposes connected therewith. (Repealed for England and Wales and Scotland by Statute Law (Repeals) Act 2004 (c. 14) and for Northern Ireland by Statute Law Revision Act 1953 (2 & 3 Eliz. 2. c. 5))
Anglo-Portuguese Commercial Treaty Act 1916	6 & 7 Geo. 5. c. 39	23 August 1916
An Act to amend the Anglo-Portuguese Commercial Treaty Act, 1914. (Note: Anglo-Portuguese Commercial Treaty Act 1914 (5 & 6 Geo. 5. c. 1))
Telegraph (Construction) Act 1916 (repealed)	6 & 7 Geo. 5. c. 40	23 August 1916
An Act to amend the Telegraph Acts, 1863 to 1915, with respect to the construction and maintenance of telegraphic lines. (Repealed by Telecommunications Act 1984 (c. 12))
Merchant Shipping (Salvage) Act 1916 (repealed)	6 & 7 Geo. 5. c. 41	23 August 1916
An Act to authorise the recovery of salvage in respect of services rendered by certain ships belonging to His Majesty. (Repealed by Merchant Shipping (Salvage) Act 1940 (3 & 4 Geo. 6. c. 43))
British Ships (Transfer Restriction) Act 1916 (repealed)	6 & 7 Geo. 5. c. 42	23 August 1916
An Act to amend and extend the British Ships (Transfer Restriction) Act, 1915. (Note: British Ships (Transfer Restriction) Act 1915 (5 & 6 Geo. 5. c. 21)) (Repealed by Statute Law Revision Act 1927 (17 & 18 Geo. 5. c. 42))
War Charities Act 1916 (repealed)	6 & 7 Geo. 5. c. 43	23 August 1916
An Act to provide for the Registration of Charities for purposes connected with the present War. (Repealed by War Charities Act 1940 (3 & 4 Geo. 6. c. 31))
Parliament and Local Elections Act 1916 (repealed)	6 & 7 Geo. 5. c. 44	23 August 1916
An Act to amend the Parliament and Registration Act, 1916; (Note: Parliament and Registration Act 1916 (5 & 6 Geo. 5. c. 100)) and to extend the Elections and Registration Act, 1915, (Note: Elections and Registration Act 1915 (5 & 6 Geo. 5. c. 76)) with respect to elections of local authorities and other bodies, and the revision of jurors' lists in Ireland. (Repealed by Parliament and Local Elections Act 1917 (7 & 8 Geo. 5. c. 13) and Statute Law Revision Act 1927 (17 & 18 Geo. 5. c. 42))
Time (Ireland) Act 1916	6 & 7 Geo. 5. c. 45	23 August 1916
An Act to assimilate the Time adopted for use in Ireland to that adopted for use in Great Britain.
Law and Procedure (Emergency Provisions) (Ireland) Act 1916 (repealed)	6 & 7 Geo. 5. c. 46	23 August 1916
An Act to amend the Law and the Procedure of Civil Courts in Ireland, in relation to conditions arising out of the recent disturbances in that country. (Repealed by Judicature (Northern Ireland) Act 1978 (c. 23))
Municipal Savings Banks (War Loan Investment) Act 1916 (repealed)	6 & 7 Geo. 5. c. 47	23 August 1916
An Act to facilitate the Investment of Savings in Securities issued for the purposes of the present War by means of the establishment of Municipal Savings Banks. (Repealed by Statute Law Revision Act 1950 (14 Geo. 6. c. 6))
Consolidated Fund (No. 5) Act 1916 (repealed)	6 & 7 Geo. 5. c. 48	31 October 1916
An Act to apply certain sums out of the Consolidated Fund to the service of the years ending on the thirty-first day of March one thousand nine hundred and fifteen and one thousand nine hundred and seventeen. (Repealed by Statute Law Revision Act 1927 (17 & 18 Geo. 5. c. 42))
Court of Session (Extracts) Act 1916 (repealed)	6 & 7 Geo. 5. c. 49	31 October 1916
An Act to amend the Form of Warrant of Execution on Extracts of Decrees of the Court of Session, and to provide for the means of making and the authentication of such Extracts. (Repealed by Act of Sederunt (Rules of Court Amendment No. 8) (Miscellaneous) 1986 (SI 1986/1937))
Larceny Act 1916 (repealed)	6 & 7 Geo. 5. c. 50	31 October 1916
An Act to consolidate and simplify the Law relating to Larceny triable on Indictment and Kindred Offences. (Repealed for England and Wales by Theft Act 1968 (c. 60), for Scotland by Criminal Procedure (Scotland) Act 1975 (c. 21) and for Northern Ireland by Theft Act (Northern Ireland) 1969 (c. 16 (N.I.)))
"Anzac" (Restriction on Trade Use of Word) Act 1916	6 & 7 Geo. 5. c. 51	18 December 1916
An Act to prohibit the use of the word Anzac in connection with any trade, business, calling, or profession.
Trading with the Enemy and Export of Prohibited Goods Act 1916 (repealed)	6 & 7 Geo. 5. c. 52	18 December 1916
An Act to amend the law relating to Trading with the Enemy and the export of prohibited goods. (Repealed by Statute Law (Repeals) Act 1986 (c. 12))
National Insurance (Temporary Employment in Agriculture) Act 1916 (repealed)	6 & 7 Geo. 5. c. 53	18 December 1916
An Act to provide for the exception from Part I. of the National Insurance Act, 1911, of persons who are temporarily employed in Agriculture in connection with the present War. (Repealed by Statute Law Revision Act 1927 (17 & 18 Geo. 5. c. 42))
Friendly Societies Act 1916 (repealed)	6 & 7 Geo. 5. c. 54	18 December 1916
An Act to amend the Law relating to Friendly Societies for purposes connected with the present War. (Repealed by Statute Law Revision Act 1927 (17 & 18 Geo. 5. c. 42))
Local Government Emergency Provisions (No. 2) Act 1916 (repealed)	6 & 7 Geo. 5. c. 55	18 December 1916
An Act to make provision with respect to the calculation of the amounts payable and transferable in respect of pauper lunatics under section twenty-four of the Local Government Act, 1888. (Note: Local Government Act 1888 (51 & 52 Vict. c. 41)) (Repealed by Local Government Act 1929 (19 & 20 Geo. 5. c. 17))
Re-election of Ministers (No. 2) Act 1916 (repealed)	6 & 7 Geo. 5. c. 56	18 December 1916
An Act to make temporary provision for rendering unnecessary the Re-election of Members of the House of Commons on Acceptance of Office. (Repealed by Statute Law Revision Act 1927 (17 & 18 Geo. 5. c. 42))
Output of Beer (Restriction) Amendment Act 1916 (repealed)	6 & 7 Geo. 5. c. 57	18 December 1916
An Act to amend the Output of Beer (Restriction) Act, 1916. (Note: Output of Beer (Restriction) Act 1916 (6 & 7 Geo. 5. c. 26)) (Repealed by Statute Law Revision Act 1927 (17 & 18 Geo. 5. c. 42))
Registration of Business Names Act 1916 (repealed)	6 & 7 Geo. 5. c. 58	22 December 1916
An Act to provide for the Registration of Firms and Persons carrying on Business under Business Names and for purposes connected therewith. (Repealed for England and Wales and Scotland by Companies Act 1981 (c. 62) and for Northern Ireland by Companies (Northern Ireland) Order 1982 (SI 1982/1534 (N.I. 17)))
Constabulary and Police (Ireland) Act 1916 (repealed)	6 & 7 Geo. 5. c. 59	22 December 1916
An Act to amend the Law relating to the Pay and Pensions of the Royal Irish Constabulary and Dublin Metropolitan Police and for other purposes relating thereto. (Repealed by Constabulary and Police (Ireland) Act 1918 (8 & 9 Geo. 5. c. 53), Statute Law Revision Act 1927 (17 & 18 Geo. 5. c. 42) and Statute Law Revision Act (Northern Ireland) 1954 (c. 35 (N.I.)))
Sailors and Soldiers (Gifts for Land Settlement) Act 1916 (repealed)	6 & 7 Geo. 5. c. 60	22 December 1916
An Act to authorise the acceptance and administration by certain Government Departments and Local Authorities of Gifts for the settlement or employment on land of men who have served in His Majesty's Forces. (Repealed by Statute Law (Repeals) Act 2008 (c. 12))
Munitions (Liability for Explosions) Act 1916 (repealed)	6 & 7 Geo. 5. c. 61	22 December 1916
An Act to obtain contributions from persons in the event of their liability for damage or loss from Explosions of, or other accidents in connection with, Munitions being assumed by His Majesty's Government. (Repealed by Statute Law Revision Act 1950 (14 Geo. 6. c. 6))
Volunteer Act 1916 (repealed)	6 & 7 Geo. 5. c. 62	22 December 1916
An Act to give effect to Agreements on the part of Members of Volunteer Corps to attend Drills or undergo training or perform military duty. (Repealed by Statute Law Revision Act 1927 (17 & 18 Geo. 5. c. 42))
Defence of the Realm (Acquisition of Land) Act 1916	6 & 7 Geo. 5. c. 63	22 December 1916
An Act to make provision with respect to the possession and acquisition of land occupied or used for the Defence; of the Realm in connection with the present War and for other purposes connected therewith.
Prevention of Corruption Act 1916 (repealed)	6 & 7 Geo. 5. c. 64	22 December 1916
An Act to amend the Law relating to the Prevention of Corruption. (Repealed by Bribery Act 2010 (c. 23))
Ministry of Pensions Act 1916 (repealed)	6 & 7 Geo. 5. c. 65	22 December 1916
An Act for establishing a Ministry of Pensions and for purposes connected therewith. (Repealed by Statute Law (Repeals) Act 1993 (c. 50))
Dublin Reconstruction (Emergency Provisions) Act 1916	6 & 7 Geo. 5. c. 66	22 December 1916
An Act to amend the Law as to the erection of buildings and the making and improvement of streets in connection with the reconstruction of areas, streets, and buildings recently damaged or destroyed in Dublin, and for other purposes incidental thereto.
War Loan Act 1916 (repealed)	6 & 7 Geo. 5. c. 67	22 December 1916
An Act to make further provision for raising Money for the present War, and for purposes incidental thereto. (Repealed by National Debt Act 1958 (7 & 8 Eliz. 2. c. 6))
New Ministries and Secretaries Act 1916 (repealed)	6 & 7 Geo. 5. c. 68	22 December 1916
An Act for establishing certain new Ministries and for the appointment of additional Secretaries or Under Secretaries in certain Government Departments; and for purposes incidental thereto. (Repealed by Employment Act 1989 (c. 38))
Public Authorities and Bodies (Loans) Act 1916 (repealed)	6 & 7 Geo. 5. c. 69	22 December 1916
An Act to make further provision with respect to the borrowing powers of councils of counties and of municipal boroughs, and of other public authorities and bodies. (Repealed for England and Wales by Local Government Act 1933 (23 & 24 Geo. 5. c. 51) and London Government Act 1963 (c. 33), for Scotland by Local Government (Scotland) Act 1947 (10 & 11 Geo. 6. c. 43) and for Northern Ireland by Local Government Finance Act (Northern Ireland) 1967 (c. 2 (N.I.)))
Government War Obligations Act 1916 (repealed)	6 & 7 Geo. 5. c. 70	22 December 1916
An Act to make provision with respect to Obligations incurred by or on behalf of His Majesty's Government for the purposes of the present War or in connection therewith. (Repealed by Statute Law Revision Act 1958 (6 & 7 Eliz. 2. c. 46))
Appropriation Act 1916 (repealed)	6 & 7 Geo. 5. c. 71	22 December 1916
An Act to apply a sum out of the Consolidated Fund to the service of the year ending on the thirty-first day of March one thousand nine hundred and seventeen, and to appropriate the Supplies granted in this Session of Parliament. (Repealed by Statute Law Revision Act 1927 (17 & 18 Geo. 5. c. 42))

=== Local acts ===
Short title	Citation	Royal assent
Long title
Aberdeen Corporation Water Order Confirmation Act 1916	6 & 7 Geo. 5. c. i	19 April 1916
An Act to confirm a Provisional Order under the Private Legislation Procedure (Scotland) Act 1899 (Note: Private Legislation Procedure (Scotland) Act 1899 (62 & 63 Vict. c. 47)) relating to Aberdeen Corporation Water
	Aberdeen Corporation Water Order 1916 Provisional Order to authorise the Corporation of the City of Aberdeen to construct new waterworks and to take an additional supply of water from the River Dee and for other purposes.	
Edinburgh Corporation Order Confirmation Act 1916 (repealed)	6 & 7 Geo. 5. c. ii	17 May 1916
An Act to confirm a Provisional Order under the Private Legislation Procedure (Scotland) Act 1899 relating to Edinburgh Corporation. (Repealed by Edinburgh Corporation Order Confirmation Act 1933 (24 & 25 Geo. 5. c. v))
	Edinburgh Corporation Order 1916 Provisional Order to authorise the Corporation of the City of Edinburgh to make and maintain tramways and a tramroad to construct street widenings and other works to acquire lands to transfer to the Corporation the Royal Victoria Hospital for Consumption Edinburgh and the dispensary and farm colony used in connexion therewith to amend the Edinburgh Municipal and Police Acts and for other purposes.	
Gas Orders Confirmation Act 1916	6 & 7 Geo. 5. c. iii	17 May 1916
An Act to confirm certain Provisional Orders made by the Board of Trade under the Gas and Water Works Facilities Act 1870 (Note: Gas and Water Works Facilities Act 1870 (33 & 34 Vict. c. 70)) relating to Fleetwood Gas and Long Eaton Gas.
	Fleetwood Gas Order 1916 Order amending the Fleetwood Gas Act 1912. (Note: Fleetwood Gas Act 1912 (2 & 3 Geo. 5. c. lxiii))	
	Long Eaton Gas Order 1916 Order to empower the Long Eaton Gas Company to construct additional gasworks in the urban district of Long Eaton in the county of Derby.	
Burnley Corporation Act 1916 (repealed)	6 & 7 Geo. 5. c. iv	17 May 1916
An Act to extend the time for the construction of certain waterworks authorised by the Burnley Corporation Act 1908 (Note: Burnley Corporation Act 1908 (8 Edw. 7. c. lxxxix)) to confer further powers upon the mayor aldermen and burgesses of the borough of Burnley in regard to their water undertaking and for other purposes. (Repealed by County of Lancashire Act 1984 (c. xxi))
Weston-super-Mare Grand Pier Act 1916	6 & 7 Geo. 5. c. v	17 May 1916
An Act for conferring power upon the Senior Official Receiver in Companies Liquidation acting as liquidator of the Weston-super-Mare Grand Pier Company to sell by agreement the undertaking of that Company to extend the time for the completion of the authorised pier and works of that Company and for other purposes.
Colonial Bank Act 1916 (repealed)	6 & 7 Geo. 5. c. vi	25 May 1916
An Act for granting additional powers to the Colonial Bank. (Repealed by Colonial Bank Act 1925 (15 & 16 Geo. 5. c. cvi))
Swansea Harbour Act 1916	6 & 7 Geo. 5. c. vii	25 May 1916
An Act to postpone the repayment of certain mortgages granted by the Swansea Harbour Trustees and for other purposes.
City of Dublin Steam Packet Company's Act 1916 or the City of Dublin Steam Packet Company Act 1916 (repealed)	6 & 7 Geo. 5. c. viii	25 May 1916
An Act to extend the time limited for the repayment of money borrowed under the authority of the City of Dublin Steam Packet Company's Act 1895 (Note: City of Dublin Steam Packet Company's Act 1895 (58 & 59 Vict. c. cxxiii)) and to make other provisions in relation thereto to enable the City of Dublin Steam Packet Company to borrow further moneys and for other purposes. (Repealed by Statute Law (Repeals) Act 2013 (c. 2))
Cardiff Railway Act 1916	6 & 7 Geo. 5. c. ix	25 May 1916
An Act to extend the time limited by the Cardiff Railway Acts for the purchase of certain lands and for other purposes.
Imperial Continental Gas Association Act 1916 (repealed)	6 & 7 Geo. 5. c. x	1 June 1916
An Act to remove doubts as to the power of the Imperial Continental Gas Association to sell or dispose of portions of their undertaking to confer various powers upon the Association and for other purposes. (Repealed by Imperial Continental Gas Association Act 1929 (19 & 20 Geo. 5. c. lxxxix))
South Metropolitan Gas Act 1916	6 & 7 Geo. 5. c. xi	19 July 1916
An Act to authorise the South Metropolitan Gas Company to raise additional capital and for other purposes.
Van Diemen's Land Company Act 1916	6 & 7 Geo. 5. c. xii	19 July 1916
An Act for granting additional powers to the Van Diemen's Land Company.
Alexandra (Newport and South Wales) Docks and Railway Act 1916	6 & 7 Geo. 5. c. xiii	19 July 1916
An Act to amend the Alexandra (Newport and South Wales) Docks and Railway Act 1906 (Note: Alexandra (Newport and South Wales) Docks and Railway Act 1906 (6 Edw. 7. c. cliv)) and for other purposes.
Canada Company Act 1916 (repealed)	6 & 7 Geo. 5. c. xiv	19 July 1916
An Act for staying the winding-up of the Canada Company for enabling the Company to allot and issue further paid-up capital to the existing shareholders for granting additional powers to the Company for providing for a capital recoupment fund for amending the Company's Charter and for consolidated and amending the Acts relating to the Company and for other purposes. (Repealed by Statute Law (Repeals) Act 1977 (c. 18))
Metropolitan Electric Tramways Act 1916	6 & 7 Geo. 5. c. xv	19 July 1916
An Act to extend the times limited by the Metropolitan Electric Tramways Act 1911 (Note: Metropolitan Electric Tramways Act 1911 (1 & 2 Geo. 5. c. xciii)) and the Metropolitan Electric Tramways (Railless Traction) Act 1913 (Note: Metropolitan Electric Tramways (Railless Traction) Act 1913 (3 & 4 Geo. 5. c. ciii)) for the exercise of certain powers by the Metropolitan Electric Tramways Limited and the Middlesex County Council and for other purposes.
Plymouth and Stonehouse Gas Act 1916	6 & 7 Geo. 5. c. xvi	19 July 1916
An Act to confer further powers on the Plymouth and Stonehouse Gas Light and Coke Company to make further provision with reference to the utilisation and conversion of products arising from the manufacture of gas and the distillation of tar and for other purposes.
Uxbridge Gas Act 1916	6 & 7 Geo. 5. c. xvii	19 July 1916
An Act to provide for the transfer of the undertaking of the Eton Gas Company to the Uxbridge Gas Company to extend the limits of supply of the latter Company and for other purposes.
Folkestone Gas Act 1916	6 & 7 Geo. 5. c. xviii	19 July 1916
An Act to empower the Folkestone Gas and Coke Company to acquire the undertaking of the Hythe and Sandgate Gas Company to extend the limits of supply of the Company to provide for the conversion of the existing capital of the Company and for other purposes.
Saint John's Church Kingston-upon-Hull Act 1916	6 & 7 Geo. 5. c. xix	19 July 1916
An Act to authorise the sale of the Church of Saint John in Victoria Square in the city and county of Kingston upon Hull with the site thereof and the application of the proceeds of sale to the provision of a new church and for other purposes.
Wakefield Corporation Act 1916	6 & 7 Geo. 5. c. xx	19 July 1916
An Act to empower the mayor aldermen and citizens of the city of Wakefield to construct further waterworks to extend the time for constructing certain authorised water- works to make further provision with regard to their water undertaking and for other purposes.
London County Council (Money) Act 1916 (repealed)	6 & 7 Geo. 5. c. xxi	19 July 1916
An Act to regulate the expenditure on capital account and lending of money by the London County Council during the financial period from the first day of April one thousand nine hundred and sixteen to the thirtieth day of September one thousand nine hundred and seventeen and for other purposes. (Repealed by London County Council (Loans) Act 1955 (4 & 5 Eliz. 2. c.xxvi))
North British Railway Act 1916	6 & 7 Geo. 5. c. xxii	19 July 1916
An Act for conferring further powers upon the North British Railway Company for authorising the construction of a road diversion for empowering the Company and the Haddington County Council to acquire lands and for other purposes.
Hornsey Gas Act 1916	6 & 7 Geo. 5. c. xxiii	19 July 1916
An Act to define the boundary between the limits of the Hornsey Gas Company and the Gas Light and Coke Company for the supply of gas and for other purposes.
Electric Lighting Order Confirmation Act 1916	6 & 7 Geo. 5. c. xxiv	19 July 1916
An Act to confirm a Provisional Order made by the Board of Trade under the Electric Lighting Acts 1882 to 1909 relating to Church Stretton.
	Church Stretton Electric Lighting Order 1916 Provisional Order granted by the Board of Trade under the Electric Lighting Acts 1882 to 1909 to the Church Stretton Electric Supply Company Limited in respect of the urban district of Church Stretton and the parishes of All Stretton and Little Stretton in the rural district of Church Stretton all in the county of Salop.	
Local Government Board (Ireland) Provisional Order Confirmation (No. 1) Act 1916	6 & 7 Geo. 5. c. xxv	19 July 1916
An Act to confirm a Provisional Order of the Local Government Board for Ireland relating to the City of Dublin.
	City of Dublin (Extension of Boundaries) Provisional Order 1916 Provisional Order for altering the Dublin Corporation Act 1900. (Note: Dublin Corporation Act 1900 (63 & 64 Vict. c. cclxiv))	
Local Government Board (Ireland) Provisional Order Confirmation (Gas) Act 1916	6 & 7 Geo. 5. c. xxvi	19 July 1916
An Act to confirm a Provisional Order of the Local Government Board for Ireland relating to Bangor.
	Bangor Gas Order 1916 Bangor Urban District.	
Local Government Board's Provisional Orders Confirmation (No. 1) Act 1916	6 & 7 Geo. 5. c. xxvii	19 July 1916
An Act to confirm certain Provisional Orders of the Local Government Board relating to Bradford Burton-upon-Trent Buxton St. Helens and Warrington.
	Bradford Order 1916 Provisional Order for altering the Bradford Corporation Act 1910 (Note: Bradford Corporation Act 1910 (10 Edw. 7 & 1 Geo. 5. c. cxvii)) and the Bradford Corporation Act 1913. (Note: Bradford Corporation Act 1913 (3 & 4 Geo. 5. c. xcvi))	
	Burton-upon-Trent Order 1916 Provisional Order for partially repealing and altering the Burton-upon-Trent Corporation Act 1901. (Note: Burton-upon-Trent Corporation Act 1901 (1 Edw. 7. c. cxxix))	
	Buxton Order 1916 Provisional Order for altering the Buxton Local Board Act 1892 (Note: Buxton Local Board Act 1892 (55 & 56 Vict. c. cxliv)) and the Buxton Urban District Council Act 1904. (Note: Buxton Urban District Council Act 1904 (4 Edw. 7. c. ccxxiv))	
	St. Helens Order 1916 Provisional Order for altering the St. Helens Corporation Act 1911. (Note: St. Helens Corporation Act 1911 (1 & 2 Geo. 5. c. cxvii))	
	Warrington Order 1916 Provisional Order for partially repealing and altering the Warrington Corporation Gas Act 1877 (Note: Warrington Corporation Gas Act 1877 (40 & 41 Vict. c. xxxiii)) and the Warrington Corporation Act 1911. (Note: Warrington Corporation Act 1911 (1 & 2 Geo. 5. c. x))	
Local Government Board's Provisional Orders Confirmation (No. 2) Act 1916	6 & 7 Geo. 5. c. xxviii	19 July 1916
An Act to confirm certain Provisional Orders of the Local Government Board relating to Margate Newbury Totnes the Middlesex Districts Joint Small-pox Hospital District and the District of the Wath and Bolton Gas Board.
	Margate Order 1916 Provisional Order for altering the Margate Extension and Improvement Act 1877 (Note: Margate Extension and Improvement Act 1877 (40 & 41 Vict. c. ccvii)) the Margate Corporation Act 1908 (Note: Margate Corporation Act 1908 (8 Edw. 7. c. lxxxvii)) and the Local Government Board's Provisional Orders Confirmation (No. 2) Act 1912. (Note: Local Government Board's Provisional Orders Confirmation (No. 2) Act 1912 (2 & 3 Geo. 5. c. cxxviii))	
	Newbury Order 1916 Provisional Order for altering the Newbury Borough Extension Act 1878. (Note: Newbury Borough Extension Act 1878 (41 & 42 Vict. c. clxxxiv))	
	Totnes Order 1916 Provisional Order for altering the Totnes Improvement Act 1845 (Note: Totnes Improvement Act 1845 (8 & 9 Vict. c. cxxxiv)) and the Local Government Board's Provisional Orders Confirmation (No. 11) Act 1897. (Note: Local Government Board's Provisional Orders Confirmation (No. 11) Act 1897 (60 & 61 Vict. c. cxxxviii))	
	Middlesex Districts Joint Smallpox Hospital Order 1916 Provisional Order for altering certain Confirming Acts.	
	Wath, Bolton and Thurnscoe Gas Board Order 1916 Provisional Order for partially repealing and altering the Wath and Bolton Gas Board Act 1908. (Note: Wath and Bolton Gas Board Act 1908 (8 Edw. 7. c. xciii))	
Local Government Board's Provisional Orders Confirmation (No. 4) Act 1916	6 & 7 Geo. 5. c. xxix	19 July 1916
An Act to confirm certain Provisional Orders of the Local Government Board relating to Dover Hedon Scarborough and Sheffield.
	Dover Order 1916 Provisional Order for altering the Dover Corporation Act 1901. (Note: Dover Corporation Act 1901 (1 Edw. 7. c. ccxliii))	
	Hedon Order 1916 Provisional Order for altering the Hedon Corporation and Borough Improvement Act 1860. (Note: Hedon Corporation and Borough Improvement Act 1860 (23 & 24 Vict. c. xxxi))	
	Scarborough Order 1916 Provisional Order for altering the Scarborough Corporation Water Act 1878. (Note: Scarborough Corporation Water Act 1878 (41 & 42 Vict. c. lxxv))	
	Sheffield Order 1916 Provisional Order for altering the Sheffield Corporation (Streets and Tramways) Act 1897 (Note: Sheffield Corporation (Streets and Tramways) Act 1897 (60 & 61 Vict. c. cii)) the Sheffield Electric Lighting (Transfer) Act 1898 (Note: Sheffield Electric Lighting (Transfer) Act 1898 (61 & 62 Vict. c. ccxx)) the Sheffield Corporation Act 1900 (Note: Sheffield Corporation Act 1900 (63 & 64 Vict. c. ccxxii)) the Sheffield Corporation Act 1903 (Note: Sheffield Corporation Act 1903 (3 Edw. 7. c. cclv)) the Sheffield Corporation Act 1907 (Note: Sheffield Corporation Act 1907 (7 Edw. 7. c. xciii)) and the Sheffield Corporation Act 1912. (Note: Sheffield Corporation Act 1912 (2 & 3 Geo. 5. c. clxvii))	
Local Government Board's Provisional Order Confirmation (No. 6) Act 1916 (repealed)	6 & 7 Geo. 5. c. xxx	19 July 1916
An Act to confirm a Provisional Order of the Local Government Board relating to Lancaster. (Repealed by County of Lancashire Act 1984 (c. xxi))
	Lancaster Order 1916 Provisional Order for altering the Lancaster Corporation Act 1880 (Note: Lancaster Corporation Act 1880 (43 & 44 Vict. c. lxxvii)) and the Lancaster Corporation Act 1900. (Note: Lancaster Corporation Act 1900 (63 & 64 Vict. c. ccxxxvi))	
Provisional Order (Marriages) Confirmation Act 1916 (repealed)	6 & 7 Geo. 5. c. xxxi	19 July 1916
An Act to confirm a Provisional Order made by one of His Majesty's Principal Secretaries of State under the Provisional Order (Marriages) Act 1905. (Note: Provisional Order (Marriages) Act 1905 (5 Edw. 7. c. 23)) (Repealed by Statute Law (Repeals) Act 1977)
	St. Wilfrid Brayton and St. Mary the Virgin Ide Hill Order.	
Halifax Corporation Act Provisional Order Confirmation Act 1916 (repealed)	6 & 7 Geo. 5. c. xxxii	19 July 1916
An Act to confirm a Provisional Order made by one of His Majesty's Principal Secretaries of State under the Halifax Corporation Act 1911. (Note: Halifax Corporation Act 1911 (1 & 2 Geo. 5. c. cxiii)) (Repealed by West Yorkshire Act 1980 (c. xiv))
	Provisional Order made by the Secretary of State under the Halifax Corporation Act 1911.	
Local Government Board (Ireland) Provisional Orders Confirmation (No. 2) Act 1916	6 & 7 Geo. 5. c. xxxiii	3 August 1916
An Act to confirm certain Provisional Orders of the Local Government Board for Ireland relating to the City of Dublin and the County of Louth (two).
	Dublin (Lower Liffey Street) Order 1916 Provisional Order to enable the Corporation of Dublin to put in force the Compulsory Clauses of the Lands Clauses Acts.	
	Fane Drainage Order 1916 Provisional Order to transfer the business of the Trustees for the Fane Drainage District to the County Council of Louth.	
	Wottonstown Drainage Order 1916 Provisional Order to transfer the business of the Trustees for the Wottonstown Drainage District to the County Council of Louth.	
Local Government Board's Provisional Order Confirmation (No. 3) Act 1916 (repealed)	6 & 7 Geo. 5. c. xxxiv	3 August 1916
An Act to confirm a Provisional Order of the Local Government Board relating to Stafford. (Repealed by Staffordshire Act 1983 (c. xviii))
	Stafford (Extension) Order 1916 Provisional Order made in pursuance of the Local Government Act 1888 (Note: Local Government Act 1888 (51 & 52 Vict. c. 41)) for extending a Borough.	
Local Government Board's Provisional Orders Confirmation (No. 5) Act 1916	6 & 7 Geo. 5. c. xxxv	3 August 1916
An Act to confirm certain Provisional Orders of the Local Government Board relating to Carlisle Maidstone Nelson St. Helens and the Wandle Valley Joint Sewerage District.
	Carlisle Order 1916 Provisional Order for altering the Carlisle Corporation Act 1887. (Note: Carlisle Corporation Act 1887 (50 & 51 Vict. c. xix))	
	Maidstone Order 1916 Provisional Order for partially repealing and altering certain Local Acts.	
	Nelson Order 1916 Provisional Order for altering the Nelson Corporation Act 1903. (Note: Nelson Corporation Act 1903 (3 Edw. 7. c. cvii))	
	St. Helens Order (No. 2) 1916 Provisional Order to enable the Urban Sanitary Authority for the Borough of St. Helens to put in force the Compulsory Clauses of the Lands Clauses Acts.	
	Wandle Valley Joint Sewerage Order 1916 Provisional Order for forming a United District under Section 279 of the Public Health Act 1875. (Note: Public Health Act 1875 (38 & 39 Vict. c. 55))	
Local Government Board's Provisional Orders Confirmation (No. 7) Act 1916	6 & 7 Geo. 5. c. xxxvi	3 August 1916
An Act to confirm certain Provisional Orders of the Local Government Board relating to Westhoughton and the District of the Swinton and Mexborough Gas Board.
	Westhoughton Order 1916 Provisional Order to enable the Urban District Council of Westhoughton to put in force the Compulsory Clauses of the Lands Clauses Acts.	
	Swinton and Mexborough Gas Order 1916 Provisional Order for partially repealing and altering the Swinton and Mexborough Gas Board Act 1909. (Note: Swinton and Mexborough Gas Board Act 1909 (9 Edw. 7. c. lxvi))	
Pier and Harbour Orders Confirmation Act 1916	6 & 7 Geo. 5. c. xxxvii	3 August 1916
An Act to confirm certain Provisional Orders made by the Board of Trade under the General Pier and Harbour Act 1861 (Note: General Pier and Harbour Act 1861 (24 & 25 Vict. c. 45)) relating to Ryde and Wicklow.
	Ryde Corporation (Victoria Pier) Order 1916 Order for the transfer of the Victoria Pier at Ryde from the Ryde Pier Company to the Ryde Corporation for conferring powers on the Corporation with reference to the holding maintenance management and improvement of the said Pier and of the Town Quay to authorise the Corporation to borrow money and for other purposes.	
	Wicklow Harbour Order 1916 Order for the transfer to the Wicklow Urban District Council of certain Harbour Works constructed by the Wicklow Harbour Commissioners in Wicklow Bay and of the powers of the said Commissioners to maintain alter improve and extend such works and for other purposes.	
Land Drainage (Feltwell) Provisional Order Confirmation Act 1916	6 & 7 Geo. 5. c. xxxviii	3 August 1916
An Act to confirm a Provisional Order made by the Board of Agriculture and Fisheries under the Land Drainage Act 1914 (Note: Land Drainage Act 1914 (5 & 6 Geo. 5. c. 4)) relating to Feltwell New Fen District and Feltwell Fen Second District in the County of Norfolk.
	Feltwell Provisional Order 1916 Feltwell Provisional Order.	
Land Drainage (Lilleshall) Provisional Order Confirmation Act 1916 (repealed)	6 & 7 Geo. 5. c. xxxix	3 August 1916
An Act to confirm a Provisional Order made by the Board of Agriculture and Fisheries under the Land Drainage Act 1861 (Note: Land Drainage Act 1861 (24 & 25 Vict. c. 133)) relating to a proposed Drainage District in the County of Salop. (Repealed by Statute Law (Repeals) Act 1993 (c. 50))
	In the matter of a proposed Drainage District in the parishes of Longdon Ercall Magna Eyton Bolas Magna Kynnersley Cherrington Tibberton Preston on the Weald Moors and Edgmond in the county of Salop.	
Aberdare and Aberaman Gas Act 1916	6 & 7 Geo. 5. c. xl	3 August 1916
An Act to authorise the Aberdare and Aberaman Consumers Gas Company to raise additional capital to construct new works and for other purposes.
Tynemouth Corporation Act 1916	6 & 7 Geo. 5. c. xli	3 August 1916
An Act to extend the limits for the supply of water by the mayor aldermen and burgesses of the borough of Tynemouth to authorise them to construct additional waterworks and to confer further powers upon them with respect to their water undertaking to make further pro- vision for the health local government and improvement of the borough and for other purposes.
Colchester Gas Act 1916	6 & 7 Geo. 5. c. xlii	3 August 1916
An Act to confer further powers upon the Colchester Gas Company and to extend their limits of supply and for other purposes.
Ferndale Gas Act 1916 (repealed)	6 & 7 Geo. 5. c. xliii	3 August 1916
An Act to confer further powers upon the Ferndale Gas Company Limited and for other purposes. (Repealed by Rhondda Gas Order 1939 (SR&O 1939/798))
Great Central and Sheffield District Railways Act 1916	6 & 7 Geo. 5. c. xliv	3 August 1916
An Act to confirm agreements between the Great Central Railway Company and the Sheffield District Railway Company with reference to the latter company's railway and for other purposes.
River Glen Act 1916	6 & 7 Geo. 5. c. xlv	10 August 1916
An Act to confer powers upon the Glen Bank Trustees and for other purposes.
Yeadon Waterworks Act 1916	6 & 7 Geo. 5. c. xlvi	10 August 1916
An Act to confer further powers upon the Yeadon Waterworks Company and for other purposes.
Clayton Aniline Company (Railways) Act 1916	6 & 7 Geo. 5. c. xlvii	17 August 1916
An Act to authorise the construction by the Clayton Aniline Company Limited of branch railways for the conveyance of traffic between their works and the Lancashire and Yorkshire Railway and for other purposes.
Conway and Colwyn Bay Joint Water Supply Board Act 1916	6 & 7 Geo. 5. c. xlviii	17 August 1916
An Act to authorise the construction of a reservoir by means of a dam across the Afon Ddu and the taking of water by the Conway and Colwyn Bay Joint Water Supply Board and by the Aluminium Corporation Limited for power purposes and for other purposes.
Newcastle-upon-Tyne and Gateshead Gas Act 1916	6 & 7 Geo. 5. c. xlix	17 August 1916
An Act to extend the limits for the supply of gas of the Newcastle-upon-Tyne and Gateshead Gas Company to confer further powers upon that Company in connexion with their undertaking and for other purposes.
Municipal Corporations (Buxton Scheme Confirmation) Act 1916 (repealed)	6 & 7 Geo. 5. c. l	23 August 1916
An Act to confirm a Scheme made by a Committee of the Lords of His Majesty's Privy Council under the Municipal Corporation Acts 1882 (Note: Municipal Corporations Act 1882 (45 & 46 Vict. c. 50)) and 1885 (Note: School Boards Act 1885 (48 & 49 Vict. c. 38)) relating to Buxton. (Repealed by Derbyshire Act 1981 (c. xxxiv))
	Borough of Buxton Scheme 1916 Buxton Scheme.	
Shropshire, Worcestershire and Staffordshire Electric Power Act 1916 (repealed)	6 & 7 Geo. 5. c. li	23 August 1916
An Act to confer further powers upon the Shropshire Worcestershire and Staffordshire Electric Power Company and for other purposes. (Repealed by Shropshire, Worcestershire and Staffordshire Electric Power (Consolidation) Act 1938 (1 & 2 Geo. 6. c. lviii))
Holligrave Charity Scheme Confirmation Act 1916	6 & 7 Geo. 5. c. lii	18 December 1916
An Act to confirm a Scheme of the Charity Commissioners for the application of the Charity of Margaret Holligrave under the management of the Clothworkers' Company.
	Scheme for the application of the Charity of Margaret Holligrave under the management of the Clothworkers' Company.	
Stony Stratford Charities Scheme Confirmation Act 1916	6 & 7 Geo. 5. c. liii	18 December 1916
An Act to confirm a Scheme of the Charity Commissioners for the application or management of certain Charities in the Parishes of Stony Stratford East and Stony Stratford West constituting and known as the Town of Stony Stratford in the County of Buckingham.
	Scheme for the application or management of the following Charities in the Parishes of Stony Stratford East and Stony Stratford West constituting and known as the Town of Stony Stratford in the County of Buckingham:—: 1. The Charity called or known as the Street Charity; 2. The Charity called or known as the Town Close Charity.	
Baptist Chapels Scheme Confirmation Act 1916	6 & 7 Geo. 5. c. liv	18 December 1916
An Act to confirm a Scheme of the Charity Commissioners for the application or management of certain Charities.
	Scheme for the application or management of the following charities:—: 1. The Charity consisting of—; 1. The Agard Street Baptist Chapel in the Borough of Derby in the County of Derby comprised in the following Indentures or some or one of them:— Indenture of Release dated twenty-fifth March one thousand eight hundred and six; Indenture of Conveyance dated sixteenth August one thousand eight hundred and seventy-nine; Indenture of Exchange dated sixth May one thousand eight hundred and ninety-six; 2. The Agard Street Baptist Chapel Schools in the said borough comprised in the following Indentures or one of them:— Indenture of Release dated thirty-first August one thousand eight hundred and twenty-eight; Indenture of Conveyance dated first June one thousand eight hundred and seventy-eight: 2. The Charity consisting of the Fifehead Magdalen Baptist Chapel in the Parish of West Stour in the County of Dorset comprised in an Indenture dated sixteenth June one thousand eight hundred and sixty-two: 3. The Charity consisting of the Baptist Chapel and Trust Property at Chesham in the Parish of Bury in the County of Lancaster comprised in an Indenture dated seventeenth July one thousand eight hundred and ninety-six: 4. The Charity consisting of the Baptist Chapel and Trust Property in Mill Street in the City of Liverpool comprised in the following Indentures or one of them:— Indenture dated thirty-first July one thousand eight hundred and sixty-three; Indenture dated tenth January one thousand eight hundred and seventy-three: 5. The Charity consisting of the Baptist Chapel in Solway Street in the City of Liverpool comprised in an Indenture dated in one thousand eight hundred and seventy-seven: 6. The Charity consisting of the Baptist Chapel in the Parish of Parr in the County of Lancaster comprised in an Indenture dated fourth May one thousand eight hundred and seventy-seven: 7. The Charity consisting of the Baptist Chapel in Devon Road in the Parish of Widnes in the County of Lancaster comprised in an Indenture dated nineteenth March one thousand eight hundred and ninety: 8. The Charity founded by Indenture dated twenty-fifth September one thousand eight hundred and thirty-two and now consisting of the Baptist Chapel and Burial Ground in the Parish of Llanddewi Rhydderch in the County of Monmouth: 9. The Charity consisting of the Baptist Chapel in Goldsworth Road in the Parish of Woking in the County of Surrey comprised in the following Indentures or some or one of them:— Indenture dated thirtieth October one thousand eight hundred and seventy-nine; Indenture dated fourteenth April one thousand eight hundred and eighty-six; Indenture dated twenty-eighth June one thousand eight hundred and eighty-six; Indenture dated thirtieth March one thousand eight hundred and ninety-nine: 10. The Charity consisting of "Jerusalem" Welsh Baptist Chapel in Brentnall Street in the Parish of Middlesbrough in the North Riding of the County of York comprised in an Indenture dated tenth February one thousand eight hundred and seventy-six.	
Burnham-on-Crouch Chapel Scheme Confirmation Act 1916	6 & 7 Geo. 5. c. lv	18 December 1916
An Act to confirm a Scheme of the Charity Commissioners for the application or management of the Charity consisting of the Protestant Congregational Dissenters' Chapel in the Parish of Burnham-on-Crouch in the County of Essex.
	Scheme for the application or management of the Charity consisting of the Protestant Congregational Dissenters' Chapel in the Parish of Burnham-on-Crouch in the County of Essex.	
Bradford (Infirmary Street) Baptist Chapel Scheme Confirmation Act 1916	6 & 7 Geo. 5. c. lvi	18 December 1916
An Act to confirm a Scheme of the Charity Commissioners for the application or management of the Charity consisting of the Clear Proceeds of Sale of the Bethel Baptist Chapel and School in Infirmary Street in the City of Bradford.
	Scheme for the application or management of the Charity consisting of the Clear Proceeds of Sale of the Bethel Baptist Chapel and School in Infirmary Street in the City of Bradford.	
Bradninch Chapel Charity Scheme Confirmation Act 1916	6 & 7 Geo. 5. c. lvii	18 December 1916
An Act to confirm a Scheme of the Charity Commissioners for the application or management of the Charity consisting of the Particular Baptist Chapel and Trust Property in the Parish of Bradninch in the County of Devon.
	Scheme for the application or management of the Charity consisting of the Particular Baptist Chapel and Trust Property in the Parish of Bradninch in the County of Devon comprised in the following Instruments or some or one of them:— Indenture dated 24th April 1819; Indenture dated 24th February 1858; Indenture dated 27th December 1873; Will of Henry Sparkes Bowden proved at Exeter on the 16th August 1874; Will of Sarah Bidgood proved at Exeter on the 21st December 1909.	
Bethlehem Chapel (Tryddyn) Charity Scheme Confirmation Act 1916	6 & 7 Geo. 5. c. lviii	18 December 1916
An Act to confirm a Scheme of the Charity Commissioners for the application or management of the Charity consisting of the Bethlehem Chapel in the Civil Parish of Tryddyn in the County of Flint.
	Scheme for the application or management of the Charity consisting of the Bethlehem Chapel in the Civil Parish of Tryddyn in the County of Flint comprised in an Indenture dated 7th September 1874.	
Pisgah Chapel (Tryddyn) Charity Scheme Confirmation Act 1916	6 & 7 Geo. 5. c. lix	18 December 1916
An Act to confirm a Scheme of the Charity Commissioners for the application or management of the Charity consisting of Pisgah Chapel and Property in the Civil Parish of Tryddyn in the County of Flint.
	Scheme for the application or management of the Charity consisting of Pisgah Chapel and Property in the Civil Parish of Tryddyn in the County of Flint comprised in the following Indentures or one of them:— Indenture dated 13th December 1855; Indenture dated 29th July 1899.	
Moriah Chapel (Broughton) Charity Scheme Confirmation Act 1916	6 & 7 Geo. 5. c. lx	18 December 1916
An Act to confirm a Scheme of the Charity Commissioners for the application or management of the Charity consisting of Moriah Chapel in the Civil Parish of Broughton in the County of Denbigh.
	Scheme for the application or management of the Charity consisting of Moriah Chapel in the Civil Parish of Broughton in the County of Denbigh comprised in an Indenture dated 25th March 1884.	
Bethany Chapel Charity Scheme Confirmation Act 1916	6 & 7 Geo. 5. c. lxi	18 December 1916
An Act to confirm a Scheme of the Charity Commissioners for the application or management of the Charity consisting of the Bethany Particular Baptist Chapel at West Cross Mumbles in the Parish of Oystermouth in the County of Glamorgan.
	Scheme for the application or management of the Charity consisting of the Bethany Particular Baptist Chapel at West Cross Mumbles in the Parish of Oystermouth in the County of Glamorgan comprised in the following Indentures:— Indenture dated 15th July 1851; Indenture dated 14th February 1912.	
Congregational Chapels Charities Scheme Confirmation Act 1916	6 & 7 Geo. 5. c. lxii	18 December 1916
An Act to confirm a Scheme of the Charity Commissioners for the application or management of certain Charities.
	Scheme for the application or management of the following Charities:—: 1. The Charity consisting of the Congregational Chapel School and Trust Property in the Township of Great Harwood in the Parish of Blackburn in the County of Lancaster: 2. The Charity consisting of the Congregational Chapel School Manse Burial Ground and Trust Property at Elswick in the Parish of St. Michael on Wyre in the County of Lancaster: 3. The Charity consisting of the Congregational Chapel School and Manse in the Parish of Horncastle in the County of Lincoln: 4. The Charity consisting of the Congregational Chapel in the Parish of Horsington in the County of Lincoln: 5. The Charity consisting of Christ Church Chapel and Trust Property in the Parish of Enfield in the County of Middlesex including the following Subsidiary Charities or Endowments administered in connexion therewith:—; 1. Charity of Matthias Peter Dupont (otherwise known as the Enfield Trust); 2. Charity of Rupertia Hill; 3. Charity known as the Lecture Hall or Sunday School; 4. Charity known as the British School: 6. The Charity consisting of the Congregational Chapel and Trust Property in the Parish of Newcastle under Lyme in the County of Stafford: 7. The Charity consisting of the Vineyard Congregational Chapel in the Parish of Richmond in the County of Surrey: 8. The following Charities in the City of Sheffield:—; 1. The Charity consisting of Nether Congregational Chapel and Trust Property; 2. The Charity consisting of the Proceeds of Sale of the Howard Street Congregational Chapel Burial Ground and Trust Property.	
Plymouth Workhouse Charities Scheme Confirmation Act 1916 (repealed)	6 & 7 Geo. 5. c. lxiii	18 December 1916
An Act to confirm a Scheme of the Charity Commissioners for the application or management of the Charities called or known as the Workhouse Charities in the County Borough of Plymouth in the County of Devon. (Repealed by Statute Law (Repeals) Act 2008 (c. 12))
	Scheme for the application or management of the Charities called or known as Workhouse Charities in the County Borough of Plymouth in the County of Devon.	
Coatbridge Gas Order Confirmation Act 1916	6 & 7 Geo. 5. c. lxiv	18 December 1916
An Act to confirm a Provisional Order under the Private Legislation Procedure (Scotland) Act 1899 relating to Coatbridge Gas.
	Coatbridge Gas Order 1916 Provisional Order to authorise the Coatbridge Gas Company to raise additional capital and for other purposes.	
Rhodes Estate Act 1916	6 & 7 Geo. 5. c. lxv	18 December 1916
An Act to revoke a codicil to the will of the late Right Honourable Cecil John Rhodes and for other purposes.
Gamble Institute Gourock Order Confirmation Act 1916	6 & 7 Geo. 5. c. lxvi	22 December 1916
An Act to confirm a Provisional Order under the Private Legislation Procedure (Scotland) Act 1899 relating to Gamble Institute Gourock.
	Gamble Institute Gourock Order 1916 Provisional Order to transfer the Gamble Institute Gourock and the endowment thereof to the Provost Magistrates and Councillors of the Burgh of Gourock and for other purposes.	

=== Private and personal acts ===
Short title	Citation	Royal assent
Long title
Craven Estates Act 1916	6 & 7 Geo. 5. c. 1 Pr.	23 August 1916
An Act for charging on the inheritance of the estates in the counties of London and Middlesex known as the Craven Estates certain incumbrances now affecting the life interest of Augustus William Craven therein and for the rearrangement of certain policies of assurance on his life and for other purposes connected with the said estates.
Alexander's Restitution Act 1916 (Note: This act was not printed by the King's Printer)	6 & 7 Geo. 5. c. 2 Pr.	25 May 1916
An Act for the restitution in blood of the heirs of the late Reginald Gervase Alexander so far as relates to the honour and dignity of the barony of Cobham.
Irvine's Divorce Act 1916	6 & 7 Geo. 5. c. 3 Pr.	19 July 1916
An Act to dissolve the marriage of the Honourable Flora Fitzmaurice Irvine with Edward St. George Tottenham Irvine her now husband and to enable her to marry again and for other purposes.
Lecky's Divorce Act 1916	6 & 7 Geo. 5. c. 4 Pr.	19 July 1916
An Act to dissolve the marriage of Hugh Lecky with Annie Margaret Lecky his present wife and to enable him to marry again and for other purposes.
Gore's Divorce Act 1916	6 & 7 Geo. 5. c. 5 Pr.	10 August 1916
An Act to dissolve the marriage of Reginald Edward Gore with the Honourable Nellie Viola Castalia Florence Gore (commonly called Lady Viola Gore) his now wife and to enable him to marry again and for other purposes.

=== Sources ===
- 6 & 7 George V - 1916 – via HathiTrust.

== See also ==
- List of acts of the Parliament of the United Kingdom
