= Restoration of Pre-War Practices Act 1919 =

Act of the Parliament of the United Kingdom

Restoration of Pre-War Practices Act 1919 (Note: Section 6(1).)
- Act of Parliament
- Parliament of the United Kingdom
- Long title: An Act to make provision with respect to the restoration after the present war of certain trade practices, and to amend the law relating to munitions tribunals.
- Citation: 9 & 10 Geo. 5. c. 42
- Territorial extent: United Kingdom

Dates
- Royal assent: 15 August 1919
- Commencement: 15 August 1919 (Note: The Acts of Parliament (Commencement) Act 1793.)
- Repealed: 22 December 1927
Other legislation
Amends	Munitions of War Act 1915
Repealed by	Statute Law Revision Act 1927

Status: Repealed

Text of statute as originally enacted

The Restoration of Pre-War Practices Act 1919 (9 & 10 Geo. 5. c. 42) was an act of the Parliament of the United Kingdom passed on 15 August 1919, which gave soldiers returning from World War I their pre-war jobs back.

The Restoration of Pre-War Practices (No. 3) Bill (UK) had its second reading in Parliament on 2 June 1919. The Minister of Labour, Sir Robert Horne described it as "designed to ensure to the trade unions of the country the right to have restored certain trade union customs and practices which they gave up during the War in order to bring about the greatest possible production of war material."

One of the consequences of the act was that women were no longer eligible to work in many of the roles they were employed to fill during the war. By 1920, a million fewer women were in employment. The act caused over 25 percent of working women to return from factories to domestic service as they were dismissed to make way for returning soldiers, whilst others established societies to support women to stay in the careers they had entered during the war. The act gave employers up to two months to return to pre-war practices and then required them to be maintained for at least a year. The removal of women from employment combined with the economic downturn of late 1920 reinforced employer and trade union hostility to their return.

== Subsequent developments ==
The whole act was repealed by section 1 of, and the part I of the schedule to, the Statute Law Revision Act 1927 (17 & 18 Geo. 5. c. 42), which came into force on 22 December 1927.

== See also ==
- British women in World War I
- British women on the home front during World War I
- The Gretna Girls
- History of women in engineering in the United Kingdom
