= Colonial Bank (West Indies) =

Bank

- Industry: Banking
- Founded: June 1, 1836; 189 years ago in London
- Defunct: September 15, 1925
- Successor: Barclays Bank (Dominion, Colonial and Overseas)
- Headquarters: London, United Kingdom
- Area served: West Indies

Colonial Bank Act 1856
- Act of Parliament
- Parliament of the United Kingdom
- Long title: An Act to extend the Period limited for the Exercise of the Powers of the Colonial Bank; and for other Purposes.
- Citation: 19 & 20 Vict. c. iii

Dates
- Royal assent: 29 April 1856

Other legislation
- Repealed by: Colonial Bank Act 1925

Status: Repealed

Text of statute as originally enacted

Colonial Bank Act 1898
- Act of Parliament
- Parliament of the United Kingdom
- Long title: An Act to alter and extend the constitution and powers of the Colonial Bank.
- Citation: 61 & 62 Vict. c. cxxxi

Dates
- Royal assent: 25 July 1898

Other legislation
- Repealed by: Colonial Bank Act 1925

Status: Repealed

Text of statute as originally enacted

Colonial Bank Act 1900
- Act of Parliament
- Parliament of the United Kingdom
- Long title: An Act to increase the limit of the Note issue of the Colonial Bank and for other purposes.
- Citation: 63 & 64 Vict. c. ii

Dates
- Royal assent: 9 April 1900

Other legislation
- Repealed by: Colonial Bank Act 1925

Status: Repealed

The Colonial Bank was a bank in the British territories of the West Indies during the colonial era. The bank was established by royal charter on 1 June 1836, and had opened offices in most of the territories by 1837.

Colonial Bank Act 1916
- Act of Parliament
- Parliament of the United Kingdom
- Long title: An Act for granting additional powers to the Colonial Bank.
- Citation: 6 & 7 Geo. 5. c. vi

Dates
- Royal assent: 25 May 1916

Other legislation
- Repealed by: Colonial Bank Act 1925

Status: Repealed

Text of statute as originally enacted

Colonial Bank Act 1917
- Act of Parliament
- Parliament of the United Kingdom
- Long title: An Act for granting additional powers to the Colonial Bank.
- Citation: 7 & 8 Geo. 5. c. xlviii

Dates
- Royal assent: 2 August 1917

Other legislation
- Repealed by: Colonial Bank Act 1925

Status: Repealed

Text of statute as originally enacted

The Colonial Bank Act 1916 (6 & 7 Geo. 5. c. vi) gave the Colonial Bank the power to operate throughout the British Empire, and it expanded to West Africa. The Colonial Bank Act 1917 (7 & 8 Geo. 5. c. xlviii) further extended the bank's powers, allowing it to operate in any part of the world. Later in 1917, the Colonial Bank entered into a working arrangement with Barclays Bank.

Colonial Bank Act 1925
- Act of Parliament
- Parliament of the United Kingdom
- Long title: An Act to provide a new constitution for The Colonial Bank and to re-incorporate the same to reorganise its capital to confer further powers on The Colonial Bank to repeal existing Charters and Acts and for further purposes.
- Citation: 15 & 16 Geo. 5. c. cvi

Dates
- Royal assent: 7 August 1925

Text of statute as originally enacted

Barclays Bank obtained control of Colonial Bank in 1919, and following re-incorporation by the Colonial Bank Act 1925 (15 & 16 Geo. 5. c. cvi) it changed its name to Barclays Bank (Dominion, Colonial and Overseas). The Anglo-Egyptian Bank and the National Bank of South Africa were then merged into Barclays Bank DCO.
