= Entertainments Duty Act 1958 =

Act of the Parliament of the United Kingdom

Entertainments Duty Act 1958 (Note: Section 11(1).)
- Act of Parliament
- Parliament of the United Kingdom
- Long title: An Act to consolidate the enactments relating to entertainments duty.
- Citation: 6 & 7 Eliz. 2. c. 9
- Territorial extent: England and Wales; Scotland; (Note: Section 11(2).)

Dates
- Royal assent: 20 February 1958
- Commencement: 20 February 1958 (Note: The Acts of Parliament (Commencement) Act 1793.)
- Repealed: 29 July 1960
Other legislation
Amends	See § Repealed enactments
Repeals/revokes	See § Repealed enactments
Repealed by	Finance Act 1960

Status: Repealed

Text of statute as originally enacted

The Entertainments Duty Act 1958 (6 & 7 Eliz. 2. c. 9) was an act of the Parliament of the United Kingdom that consolidated enactments relating to entertainments duty in Great Britain.

== Provisions ==
=== Repealed enactments ===
Section 10(2) of the act repealed 6 enactments, listed in the second schedule to the act.

Citation	Short title	Extent of repeal
6 & 7 Geo. 5. c. 11	Finance (New Duties) Act 1916	The whole act.
12 & 13 Geo. 5. c. 17	Finance Act 1922	Section eleven; in section forty-nine, subsection (1).
14 & 15 Geo. 5. c. 21	Finance Act 1924	Section six.
14 Geo. 6. c. 15	Finance Act 1950	The fourth schedule.
1 & 2 Eliz. 2. c. 34	Finance Act 1953	Section nine.
5 & 6 Eliz. 2. c. 49	Finance Act 1957	Section one; the first schedule; in the ninth schedule, part I.

== Subsequent developments ==
The act ceased to have effect by virtue of section 4(1) of the Finance Act 1960 (8 & 9 Eliz. 2. c. 44), which received royal assent on 29 July 1960.
