= Sailors and Soldiers (Gifts for Land Settlement) Act 1916 =

Act of the Parliament of the United Kingdom

Sailors and Soldiers (Gifts for Land Settlement) Act 1916 (Note: Section 2(1).)
- Act of Parliament
- Parliament of the United Kingdom
- Long title: An Act to authorise the acceptance and administration by certain Government Departments and Local Authorities of Gifts for the settlement or employment on land of men who have served in His Majesty's Forces.
- Citation: 6 & 7 Geo. 5. c. 60
- Territorial extent: United Kingdom

Dates
- Royal assent: 22 December 1916
- Commencement: 22 December 1916 (Note: The Acts of Parliament (Commencement) Act 1793.)
- Repealed: 21 July 2008
Other legislation
Amended by	Charities Act 1960; Statute Law (Repeals) Act 2004
Repealed by	Statute Law (Repeals) Act 2008

Status: Repealed

Text of statute as originally enacted

Revised text of statute as amended

The Sailors and Soldiers (Gifts for Land Settlement) Act 1916 (6 & 7 Geo. 5. c. 60) was an act of the Parliament of the United Kingdom which allowed for the donation of land to public bodies for the settlement and employment of former servicemen. The catalyst for the act was a proposed donation of land near Bosbury, Herefordshire, to the Board of Agriculture and Fisheries by Robert Buchanan, following the death of his son in the First World War.

The act was proposed by the Asquith coalition ministry in November 1916 and received royal assent under the Lloyd George ministry in December. Buchanan's land, some 288 acres (117 ha), was accepted by the board in 1918. A second donation by Buchanan of 500 acres (200 ha) was accepted in 1919. This land, the Bosbury Trust Estate, was the only land ever donated under the act. It remains in use, administered by a charitable trust for the housing and employment of military veterans.

The Sailors and Soldiers (Gifts for Land Settlement) Act 1916 was proposed for repeal by the Law Commission and Scottish Law Commission in January 2008. It was repealed by the Statute Law (Repeals) Act 2008 on 21 July 2008. It remained in force in Ireland until 2007, when it was repealed by the Statute Law Revision Act.

== Provisions ==
In 1916, following the death of his eldest son, Alan, (Note: Alan Buchanan was born on 12 December 1889. He attended Fettes College in Edinburgh before studying for a degree in physics and engineering at Downing College, Cambridge from 1910. He joined the 1st/10th battalion (Liverpool Scottish) of the King's Regiment (Liverpool) as a private at the start of the First World War in 1914. The battalion, a Territorial Force unit that volunteered for overseas war service, had been founded in 1900 with the assistance of his father. Alan deployed with the battalion to the Western Front in October 1914 and was invalided home with typhoid fever that December. He returned to the unit in Spring 1915 and served as a machine gunner. He was killed in action by a shell which struck his head as he was getting his machine gun into action during a British advance. His body was not identified and he is remembered on the Menin Gate memorial to the missing and on the Bosbury and Downing College war memorials.) at the Battle of Bellewaarde on 16 June 1915, Robert Buchanan (Note: Robert Buchanan was of Scottish origin and moved to Liverpool after purchasing a mill in Kirkdale in 1887. He acquired a second mill in 1897 and purchased the 1,000 acres (400 ha) Bosbury House estate in Alan's name. Following Alan's death he also established the Buchanan Scholarship Fund, which continues to provide for arts students at Downing College. Robert Buchanan died in 1920.) proposed gifting land near the village of Bosbury, Herefordshire, to the nation for the settlement of servicemen returned from war. There was uncertainty over whether the Board of Agriculture and Fisheries had the ability to accept the gift under existing laws.

To provide a basis in law for the acceptance by the board and local authorities of gifts of land for the purpose of providing employment for ex-servicemen, the Asquith coalition ministry proposed the Sailors and Soldiers (Gifts for Land Settlement) Bill to the House of Commons on 23 November 1916. It received a second reading on 28 November and was passed, unamended, in the House of Lords by 19 December (by this time Asquith's government had been replaced by that of Lloyd George). The act received royal assent on 22 December 1916.

Land gifted under the act was held by the public body it was gifted to, which also acted as trustee for any charitable trust formed. It was intended that land acquired under the act would be used to provide employment for ex-servicemen, partially countering an expected glut of labour when conscripted servicemen were demobilised at the end of the war and also increasing agricultural output. The Sailors and Soldiers (Gifts for Land Settlement) Act 1916 applied across the United Kingdom and land gifted was exempt from the constraints under the Mortmain and Charitable Uses Act 1888.

Land made available under the act was treated as a smallholdings colony, a profit-sharing collective of tenant farmers. These were established under separate legislation, the Small Holdings Colonies Act 1916. This authorised the government to purchase up to 20,000 acres (8,100 ha) of land for use as colonies for the settlement and employment of war veterans. The colonies were proposed due to the impracticality of the government managing isolated smallholdings and providing agricultural and business instruction to the tenants. The smallholdings were typically geared towards fruit and market garden produce, rather than more complex agriculture. Ex-servicemen with an agricultural background were granted immediate tenancies but others were required to work as employees on the colony's central farm under direction of a government-appointed manager, to gain experience.

While the Small Holdings Colonies Act only granted powers to acquire land for a period of 12 months after the end of the war the Sailors and Soldiers (Gifts for Land Settlement) Act remained in force indefinitely. The sudden ending of the war with the Armistice of 11 November 1918 caught the local authorities by surprise and central government was slow to respond due to the December 1918 general election. In the end, there was low demand for places in the smallholding colonies and, with high costs to the public purse, the Board of Agriculture and Fisheries abandoned the scheme in 1920.

Another piece of legislation, the Land Settlement (Facilities) Act 1919, allowed for the compulsory purchase of land by local authorities to provide smallholdings for sale or rent and to provide for allotments. Some £20 million of funding was provided to county councils to acquire land and make loans to tenants of the smallholdings. Demand for places on these smallholdings, run on more traditional lines, was high and by the end of 1920 14,061 ex-servicemen were granted places on the scheme, from among 49,000 applicants. With interest rates running at 6% the councils sought to make similar returns on their landholdings from rent, which proved prohibitive to the smallholders. Attempts were made by central government to assist tenants with rebates but the scheme was ended in 1926, having cost the exchequer £7.6 million. The powers to acquire land under the Land Settlement (Facilities) Act 1919 have since been repealed but elements of the act remain in effect.

The act as enacted applied only to land gifted for the settlement of "men who have served in any of His Majesty’s naval or military forces". Following the creation of the Royal Air Force (RAF) in 1918, the Air Force (Application of Enactments) (No. 2) Order 1918, an Order in Council, stated that the reference to "military forces" should be construed as including the RAF.

== Bosbury Trust Estate ==
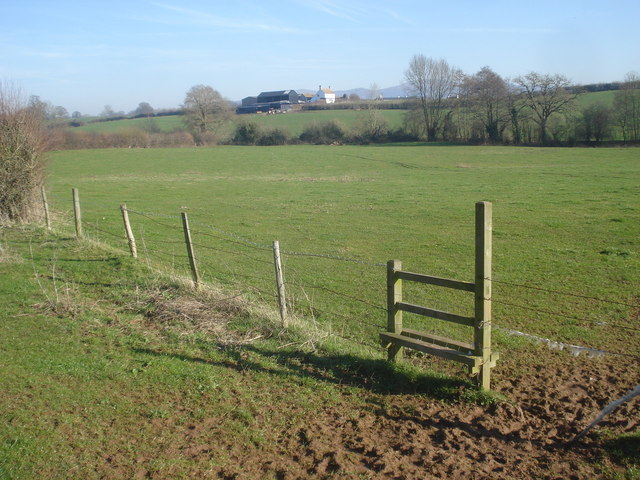
Beacon Hill Farm, part of the Bosbury Trust Estate

The only land ever donated under the act was Buchanan's. His initial donation of 288 acres (117 ha) was accepted by the Board of Agriculture and Fisheries on 21 September 1918. A second donation by Buchanan of 500 acres (200 ha) was accepted in May 1919 and added to the holding, which became known as the Bosbury Trust Estate. It was administered through a charitable trust, known as the Buchanan Trust.

Significant works were carried out to make the estate suitable for use as 16 separate smallholdings for returning servicemen. The estate was initially used only for former officers and by March 1920, seven had been granted smallholdings and two provided employment on the central farm. The land proved unsuitable as a smallholding colony and by 1926 the costs of additional works had left the estate with debts of £38,752 compared to assets of less than £24,000. The 1967 United Kingdom foot-and-mouth outbreak badly affected stock on the estate and in the aftermath the trust was reorganised under a Charity Commission scheme. The successor to the Board of Agriculture and Fisheries, the Ministry of Agriculture, Fisheries and Food, remained the estate's trustee until 1998 when trusteeship was transferred to Herefordshire Council.

Under its charitable agreement the trust can rent land to the general public if no suitable ex-military personnel can be found. In 2012 it managed seven properties, of which only two were let to veterans. The trust was criticised by Peter Buchanan, the nephew of Alan Buchanan, over its performance for which Herefordshire Council blamed the restrictive conditions of its founding documents. The Council engaged with the Charity Commission to find a way to extend the objectives of the trust to include the provision of education and training and the use of farms for respite care and therapy.

Following a recommendation by the Charity Commission the trusteeship was transferred to a new body, the Buchanan Trustee Company Limited, in May 2016. The trust has moved towards providing more accommodation on the estate, with an aim of eventually providing 20–40 almshouses to military veterans. Four new cottages were constructed as almshouses for veterans on the estate by 2021, with financial support from Homes England and Herefordshire Council. In March 2022 the trust received a £28,942 grant from the Department for Levelling Up, Housing and Communities' Community Housing Fund to help cover its costs in providing affordable housing. The funds helped pay towards the renovation of a former dairy and stableblock as two further almshouses. As of 2025, in addition to the six almshouses, the trust also operates a park home for temporary accommodation of veterans and has six other properties that are rented out, some to veterans.

== Repeal ==
The act continued to apply in Ireland after the establishment of the Irish Free State in 1922 and the Republic of Ireland in 1937. It was repealed by the Statute Law Revision Act 2007 which also repealed many other pre-1922 British statutes.

In the United Kingdom the sub-section of the act dealing with mortmain and charitable use was repealed by the Charities Act 1960. The sub-section allowing for the acceptance of land by public bodies was repealed by the Statute Law (Repeals) Act 2004. In the United Kingdom, the act was recommended for repeal in its entirety by the eighteenth report on statute law repeals published by the Law Commission and the Scottish Law Commission in January 2008. They argued that no public body would today be willing to accept land gifted with a restriction that it could only be used for the employment of veterans and that changes in farming practices had reduced the number of people that could be supported on land. The whole act was repealed by section 1(1) of, and group 4 of part 1 of schedule 1 to, the Statute Law (Repeals) Act 2008, which came into force on 21 July 2008. The act included a provision that the repeal did not affect any gifts previously made under the 1916 act.
