= Munitions of War Act 1915 =

Act of the Parliament of the United Kingdom

Munitions of War Act 1915 (Note: Section 20(1).)
- Act of Parliament
- Parliament of the United Kingdom
- Long title: An Act to make provision for furthering the efficient manufacture, transport, and supply of Munitions for the present War; and for purposes incidental thereto.
- Citation: 5 & 6 Geo. 5. c. 54
- Territorial extent: United Kingdom

Dates
- Royal assent: 2 July 1915
- Commencement: 2 July 1915 (Note: The Acts of Parliament (Commencement) Act 1793.)
- Repealed: United Kingdom: 15 August 1919; Isle of Man: 22 July 2004
Other legislation
| Amended by | Munitions of War Act 1917 |
| Repealed by | United Kingdom: Munitions of War (Amendment) Act 1916, Wages (Temporary Regulation) Act 1918 and Restoration of Pre-War Practices Act 1919; Isle of Man: Statute Law (Repeals) Act 2004 |

Status: Repealed

Text of statute as originally enacted

The Munitions of War Act 1915 (5 & 6 Geo. 5. c. 54) was an act of the Parliament of the United Kingdom passed on 2 July 1915 during the First World War. It was designed to maximize munitions output and brought private companies supplying the armed forces under the tight control of the newly created Ministry of Munitions, under David Lloyd George. The policy, according to J. A. R. Marriott, was that:

No private interest was to be permitted to obstruct the service, or imperil the safety, of the State. Trade Union regulations must be suspended; employers' profits must be limited, skilled men must fight, if not in the trenches, in the factories; man-power must be economized by the dilution of labour and the employment of women; private factories must pass under the control of the State, and new national factories be set up. Results justified the new policy: the output was prodigious; the goods were at last delivered.

The law imposed very strong regulations on wages, hours and employment conditions. It was a penal offence for a worker to leave his current job at such a "Controlled Establishment" without the consent of his employer, which in practice was "almost impossible" to obtain. The Clyde Workers' Committee was established to oppose the act.

The Munitions Act was a response to the Shell Crisis of 1915 when inadequate supplies of artillery shells and other munitions contributed to a political crisis for prime minister H. H. Asquith and the formation on 17 May 1915 of a coalition government of all three major parties.

The act forbade strikes and lockouts and replaced them with compulsory arbitration. It set up a system of controlling war industries. It established munitions tribunals that were special courts to enforce good working practices. It suspended, for the duration, restrictive practices by trade unions. It limited labour mobility between jobs. The courts ruled the definition of munitions to be broad enough to include textile workers and dock workers. The law was repealed in 1919, but similar legislation took effect during the Second World War.

As promised in 1915, under the Restoration of Pre-War Practices Act 1919 (9 & 10 Geo. 5. c. 42), the main features of the law were abolished regarding manning arrangements (in particular employment of women and unskilled workers), closed shop agreements, restriction of overtime and apprenticeship rules.

== Subsequent developments ==
The whole act was repealed for the Isle of Man by section 1(1) of, and group 11 of part 17 of schedule 1 to, the Statute Law (Repeals) Act 2004, which came into force on 22 July 2004.

== See also ==
- History of the United Kingdom during World War I
- Defence of the Realm Act 1914
- Munitionette
