= Statute Law Revision Act 1927 =

Act of the Parliament of the United Kingdom

Statute Law Revision Act 1927 (Note: Section 4.)
- Act of Parliament
- Parliament of the United Kingdom
- Long title: An Act for the further promoting the Revision of the Statute Law by repealing Enactments which have ceased to be in force or have become unnecessary.
- Citation: 17 & 18 Geo. 5. c. 42
- Territorial extent: United Kingdom

Dates
- Royal assent: 22 December 1927
- Commencement: 22 December 1927 (Note: The Acts of Parliament (Commencement) Act 1793.)
- Repealed: 5 November 1993
Other legislation
Repeals/revokes	British North America Act 1916
Amended by	Statute Law Revision Act 1950; Statute Law Revision Act 1964; Courts Act 1971; Northern Ireland Constitution Act 1973; Administration of Justice Act 1977
Repealed by	Statute Law (Repeals) Act 1993
Relates to	Statute Law Revision (Isle of Man) Act 1991

Status: Repealed

Text of statute as originally enacted

The Statute Law Revision Act 1927 (17 & 18 Geo. 5. c. 42) was an act of the Parliament of the United Kingdom.

== Subsequent developments ==
Part I of the schedule to the act was repealed by section 1(1) of, and the first schedule to, the Statute Law Revision Act 1950 (14 Geo. 6. c. 6), which came into force on 23 May 1950.

The schedule to the act was repealed by section 1 of, and the schedule to, the Statute Law Revision Act 1964, which came into force on 31 July 1964.

The words "to the court of the county palatine of Lancaster or" in section 2 of the act were repealed by section 56(4) of, and part II of schedule 11 to, the Courts Act 1971, which came into force on 1 January 1972.

Section 4(2) of the act was repealed by section 41(1) of, and part I of schedule 6 to, the Northern Ireland Constitution Act 1973, which came into force on 18 July 1973.

Section 2 of the act was repealed by section 32(4) of, and part V of schedule 5 to, the Administration of Justice Act 1977, which came into force on 29 July 1977.

The enactments which were repealed (whether for the whole or any part of the United Kingdom) by the act were repealed so far as they extended to the Isle of Man by section 1(1) of, and schedule 1 to, the Statute Law Revision (Isle of Man) Act 1991, which came into force on 25 July 1991.

The whole act was repealed by section 1(1) of, and group 1 of part XVI of schedule 1 to, the Statute Law (Repeals) Act 1993, which came into force on 5 November 1993.

== See also ==
- Statute Law Revision Act

== Bibliography ==
- Halsbury's Statutes
- HL Deb vol 68, cols 663 and 664 and 863 to 864, vol 69, cols 59, 60, 152, 230, 306 and 1266, HC Deb vol 211 cols 1388 and 2698, vol 212, col 533.
