= National Debt Act 1972 =

Act of the Parliament of the United Kingdom

National Debt Act 1972 (Note: Section 20.)
- Act of Parliament
- Parliament of the United Kingdom
- Long title: An Act to consolidate certain enactments relating to the national debt and the Director of Savings, with corrections and minor improvements made under the Consolidation of Enactments (Procedure) Act 1949.
- Citation: 1972 c. 65
- Territorial extent: United Kingdom

Dates
- Royal assent: 9 August 1972
- Commencement: 9 August 1972 (Note: The Acts of Parliament (Commencement) Act 1793.)

Other legislation
- Amends: Finance Act 1963; See § Repealed enactments
- Repeals/revokes: See § Repealed enactments
- Amended by: Northern Ireland Constitution Act 1973; Trustee Savings Banks Act 1976; Finance Act 1989; National Savings Stock Register (Closure of Register to Gilts) Order 1998; Finance (No. 2) Act 2005; Finance Act 2008

Status: Partially repealed

Text of statute as originally enacted

Revised text of statute as amended

Text of the National Debt Act 1972 as in force today (including any amendments) within the United Kingdom, from legislation.gov.uk.

The National Debt Act 1972 (c. 65) is an act of the Parliament of the United Kingdom that consolidated enactments relating to the national debt and the Director of Savings in the United Kingdom.

== Provisions ==
=== Repealed enactments ===
Section 17(1) of the act repealed 7 enactments, listed in the schedule to the act.

Enactments repealed by section 17(1)
Citation	Short title	Extent of repeal
7 & 8 Eliz. 2. c. 6	National Debt Act 1958	The whole act.
9 & 10 Eliz. 2. c. 36	Finance Act 1961	Section 35.
1965 c. 32	Administration of Estates (Small Payments) Act 1965	Section 1(2).
1967 c. 17	Iron and Steel Act 1967	Section 26(8)(c).
1968 c. 13	National Loans Act 1968	In section 16, subsections (1)(b) and (6) and in subsection (2) the words "either or both of".
1968 c. 13	National Loans Act 1968	In schedule 5 the entries relating to the National Debt Act 1958 and the Finance Act 1961.
1969 c. 32	Finance Act 1969	Section 52(2) to (4).
1969 c. 48	Post Office Act 1969	Section 93(1) and (2).
1969 c. 48	Post Office Act 1969	Section 108, except paragraphs (a) to (d), (f) and (g), of subsection (1).
1969 c. 48	Post Office Act 1969	Sections 110 to 112 and section 122.

== Subsequent developments ==
Section 18 of the act (which saved the powers of the Parliament of Northern Ireland in relation to the matters addressed by section 15) was repealed by the Northern Ireland Constitution Act 1973, which came into force on 18 July 1973. Sections 3(3), 7(3) and 14 of the act were repealed by schedule 6 to the Trustee Savings Banks Act 1976, which came into force on 20 July 1986. Section 5 (settlement of disputes as to holdings on the register) was repealed by part 5(2) of schedule 11 to the Finance (No. 2) Act 2005, which came into force on 20 July 2005. Section 10 was further amended by the Finance Act 2008.
