= National Debt Act 1958 =

Act of the Parliament of the United Kingdom

National Debt Act 1958 (Note: Section 20.)
- Act of Parliament
- Parliament of the United Kingdom
- Long title: An Act to consolidate certain enactments relating to the national debt.
- Citation: 7 & 8 Eliz. 2. c. 6
- Territorial extent: United Kingdom

Dates
- Royal assent: 18 December 1958
- Commencement: 18 December 1958 (Note: The Acts of Parliament (Commencement) Act 1793.)
- Repealed: 9 August 1972
Other legislation
Amends	See § Repealed enactments
Repeals/revokes	See § Repealed enactments
Amended by	National Loans Act 1968; Statute Law (Repeals) Act 1974
Repealed by	National Debt Act 1972

Status: Repealed

Text of statute as originally enacted

The National Debt Act 1958 (7 & 8 Eliz. 2. c. 6) was an act of the Parliament of the United Kingdom that consolidated enactments relating to the national debt of the United Kingdom.

== Provisions ==
=== Repealed enactments ===
Section 17(1) of the act repealed 31 enactments, listed in the Schedule to the act.

Citation	Short title	Extent of repeal
56 & 57 Vict. c. 69	Savings Bank Act 1893	Section five. The First Schedule.
9 Edw. 7. c. 42	Irish Land Act 1909	In section two, subsection (3).
4 & 5 Geo. 5. c. 60	War Loan Act 1914	The whole act.
5 & 6 Geo. 5. c. 7	Finance Act 1914 (Session 2)	The whole act.
5 & 6 Geo. 5. c. 55	War Loan Act 1915	The whole act.
5 & 6 Geo. 5. c. 93	War Loan (Supplemental Provisions) Act 1915	Sections one to six. In section eleven, the words from "and so far" onwards.
6 & 7 Geo. 5. c. 24	Finance Act 1916	Section fifty-eight. In section sixty-five, the words "In the application of this section" onwards.
6 & 7 Geo. 5. c. 67	War Loan Act 1916	The whole act.
7 & 8 Geo. 5. c. 31	Finance Act 1917	Section thirty-three.
7 & 8 Geo. 5. c. 41	War Loan Act 1917	The whole act.
8 & 9 Geo. 5. c. 15	Finance Act 1918	In section thirty-eight, subsection (1) and, in subsection (5), the definition of "war stock". Section forty-one.
8 & 9 Geo. 5. c. 25	War Loan Act 1918	The whole act.
9 & 10 Geo. 5. c. 37	War Loan Act 1919	In section one, subsection (4). Section four. In section seven, the words from "and the War Loan Acts, 1914 to 1918" onwards.
10 & 11 Geo. 5. c. 12	Savings Banks Act 1920	The whole act.
10 & 11 Geo. 5. c. 18	Finance Act 1920	Section fifty-nine.
13 & 14 Geo. 5. c. 14	Finance Act 1923	Section thirty-three.
15 & 16 Geo. 5. c. 34	Northern Ireland Land Act 1925	In section two, subsection (4).
16 & 17 Geo. 5. c. 22	Finance Act 1926	Section forty-six.
18 & 19 Geo. 5. c. 17	Finance Act 1928	Section twenty-nine.
19 & 20 Geo. 5. c. 27	Savings Banks Act 1929	Section twelve.
20 & 21 Geo. 5. c. 28	Finance Act 1930	Section fifty-two.
21 & 22 Geo. 5. c. 28	Finance Act 1931	Section forty-three.
22 & 23 Geo. 5. c. 25	Finance Act 1932	Section twenty-three.
25 & 26 Geo. 5. c. 24	Finance Act 1935	In section thirty, in subsection (6), the words "and the First Schedule to the Savings Bank Act, 1893".
26 Geo. 5 & 1 Edw. 8. c. 43	Tithe Act 1936	In section twenty-four, subsection (8).
2 & 3 Geo. 6. c. 41	Finance Act 1939	In section thirty-five, subsection (3).
2 & 3 Geo. 6. c. 117	National Loans Act 1939	In section one, in subsection (4), the words from "and notwithstanding" onwards, and subsection (5). In the Second Schedule, in paragraph (5), sub-paragraph (a).
5 & 6 Geo. 6. c. 21	Finance Act 1942	In section forty-seven, in subsection (4), in paragraph (c), the words "inscribed or".
11 & 12 Geo. 6. c. 49	Finance Act 1948	In section eighty-one, the words "as if the money raised thereby had been raised under that Act through the Post Office in, and in the currency of, the United Kingdom," and the word "accordingly".
4 & 5 Eliz. 2. c. 6	Miscellaneous Financial Provisions Act 1955	In section five, subsection (12), and, in subsection (15), the words "and (12)".
6 & 7 Eliz. 2. c. 8	Trustee Savings Bank Act 1958	In section five, subsection (8).

== Subsequent developments ==
The whole act was repealed by section 17(1) of, and the schedule to, the National Debt Act 1972, which came into force on 9 August 1972.

Section 17(1) of, and the schedule to, the act were repealed by section 1 of, and part XI of the schedule to, the Statute Law (Repeals) Act 1974, which came into force on 27 June 1974.
