= List of acts of the Parliament of the United Kingdom from 1914 =

This is a complete list of acts of the Parliament of the United Kingdom for the year 1914.

Note that the first parliament of the United Kingdom was held in 1801; parliaments between 1707 and 1800 were either parliaments of Great Britain or of Ireland). For acts passed up until 1707, see the list of acts of the Parliament of England and the list of acts of the Parliament of Scotland. For acts passed from 1707 to 1800, see the list of acts of the Parliament of Great Britain. See also the list of acts of the Parliament of Ireland.

For acts of the devolved parliaments and assemblies in the United Kingdom, see the list of acts of the Scottish Parliament, the list of acts of the Northern Ireland Assembly, and the list of acts and measures of Senedd Cymru; see also the list of acts of the Parliament of Northern Ireland.

The number shown after each act's title is its chapter number. Acts passed before 1963 are cited using this number, preceded by the year(s) of the reign during which the relevant parliamentary session was held; thus the Union with Ireland Act 1800 is cited as "39 & 40 Geo. 3 c. 67", meaning the 67th act passed during the session that started in the 39th year of the reign of George III and which finished in the 40th year of that reign. Note that the modern convention is to use Arabic numerals in citations (thus "41 Geo. 3" rather than "41 Geo. III"). Acts of the last session of the Parliament of Great Britain and the first session of the Parliament of the United Kingdom are both cited as "41 Geo. 3". Acts passed from 1963 onwards are simply cited by calendar year and chapter number.

== 4 & 5 Geo. 5 ==
The fourth session of the 30th Parliament of the United Kingdom, which met from 10 February 1914 until 18 September 1914.

This session was also traditionally cited as 4 & 5 G. 5.

=== Public general acts ===
Short title	Citation	Royal assent
Long title
Consolidated Fund (No. 1) Act 1914 (repealed)	4 & 5 Geo. 5. c. 1	31 March 1914
An Act to apply certain sums out of the Consolidated Fund to the service of the years ending on the thirty-first day of March one thousand nine hundred and fourteen and one thousand nine hundred and fifteen. (Repealed by Statute Law Revision Act 1927 (17 & 18 Geo. 5. c. 42))
Army (Annual) Act 1914 (repealed)	4 & 5 Geo. 5. c. 2	30 April 1914
An Act to provide, during Twelve Months, for the Discipline and Regulation of the Army. (Repealed by Statute Law Revision Act 1927 (17 & 18 Geo. 5. c. 42), Statute Law Revision Act 1950 (14 Geo. 6. c. 6) and Revision of the Army and Air Force Acts (Transitional Provisions) Act 1955 (3 & 4 Eliz. 2. c. 20))
Grey Seals Protection Act 1914 (repealed)	4 & 5 Geo. 5. c. 3	8 July 1914
An Act to provide for the better Protection of the Grey Seal. (Repealed for England and Wales and Scotland by Grey Seals Protection Act 1932 (22 & 23 Geo. 5. c. 23) and for Northern Ireland by Grey Seals Protection Act (Northern Ireland) 1933 (23 & 24 Geo. 5. c. 11 (N.I.)))
Sheffield University Act 1914 (repealed)	4 & 5 Geo. 5. c. 4	31 July 1914
An Act to extend the privileges of the graduates of the University of Sheffield. (Repealed by Statute Law (Repeals) Act 1998 (c. 43))
Superannuation (Ecclesiastical Commissioners and Queen Anne's Bounty) Act 1914 (repealed)	4 & 5 Geo. 5. c. 5	31 July 1914
An Act to amend the Ecclesiastical Commissioners (Superannuation) Act, 1865, (Note: Ecclesiastical Commissioners (Superannuation) Act 1865 (28 & 29 Vict. c. 68)) and the Queen Anne's Bounty (Superannuations) Act, 1870. (Note: Queen Anne's Bounty (Superannuation) Act 1870 (33 & 34 Vict. c. 89)) (Repealed by Statute Law (Repeals) Act 1971 (c. 52))
Affiliation Orders Act 1914 (repealed)	4 & 5 Geo. 5. c. 6	31 July 1914
An Act to amend the Law relating to the Collection and Recovery of Moneys due under Affiliation Orders and for other purposes connected therewith. (Repealed by Affiliation Proceedings Act 1957 (5 & 6 Eliz. 2. c. 55))
Agricultural Holdings Act 1914 (repealed)	4 & 5 Geo. 5. c. 7	31 July 1914
An Act to extend the provisions of section eleven of the Agricultural Holdings Act, 1908, (Note: Agricultural Holdings Act 1908 (8 Edw. 7. c. 28)) to the determination of tenancies in connection with the sale of holdings. (Repealed by Agriculture Act 1920 (10 & 11 Geo. 5. c. 76))
Police (Weekly Rest-Day) (Scotland) Act 1914 (repealed)	4 & 5 Geo. 5. c. 8	31 July 1914
An Act to facilitate the grant to members of the Constabulary in Scotland of one day's rest off duty in every seven. (Repealed by Police (Scotland) Act 1956 (4 & 5 Eliz. 2. c. 26))
Government of the Soudan Loan Act 1914 (repealed)	4 & 5 Geo. 5. c. 9	31 July 1914
An Act to amend the Schedule to the Government of the Soudan Loan Act, 1913. (Note: Government of the Soudan Loan Act 1913 (3 & 4 Geo. 5. c. 10)) (Repealed by Government of the Soudan Loan Act 1919 (9 & 10 Geo. 5. c. 43))
Finance Act 1914 (repealed)	4 & 5 Geo. 5. c. 10	31 July 1914
An Act to continue the Duty of Customs on Tea, to re-impose Income Tax and Super-Tax, with amendments and modifications, and to amend the Law relating to Death Duties and the National Debt, and for purposes incidental thereto. (Repealed by Finance Act 1916 (6 & 7 Geo. 5. c. 24), Income Tax Act 1918 (8 & 9 Geo. 5. c. 40), Statute Law Revision Act 1927 (17 & 18 Geo. 5. c. 42), Finance Act 1949 (12, 13 & 14 Geo. 6. c. 47), Finance Act 1958 (6 & 7 Eliz. 2. c. 56), Finance Act 1969 (c. 32) and Finance Act 1975 (c. 7))
Postponement of Payments Act 1914 (repealed)	4 & 5 Geo. 5. c. 11	3 August 1914
An Act to authorise His Majesty by Proclamation to suspend temporarily the payment of Bills of Exchange and payments in pursuance of other obligations. (Repealed by Statute Law Revision Act 1927 (17 & 18 Geo. 5. c. 42))
Aliens Restriction Act 1914 (repealed)	4 & 5 Geo. 5. c. 12	5 August 1914
An Act to enable His Majesty in time of war or imminent national danger or great emergency by Order in Council to impose Restrictions on Aliens and make such provisions as appear necessary or expedient for carrying such restrictions into effect. (Repealed by Immigration Act 1971 (c. 77))
Prize Courts (Procedure) Act 1914	4 & 5 Geo. 5. c. 13	5 August 1914
An Act to amend the Law relating to Procedure in Prize Courts.
Currency and Bank Notes Act 1914 (repealed)	4 & 5 Geo. 5. c. 14	6 August 1914
An Act to authorise the issue of Currency Notes, and to make provision with respect to the Note Issue of Banks. (Repealed for the United Kingdom by Currency and Bank Notes, 1928 (18 & 19 Geo. 5. c. 13), Theft Act 1968 (c. 60) and Theft Act (Northern Ireland) 1969 (c. 16 (N.I.)) and for the Isle of Man by Statute Law Revision (Isle of Man) Act 1991 (c. 61))
Exportation of Horses Act 1914 (repealed)	4 & 5 Geo. 5. c. 15	7 August 1914
An Act to amend the Diseases of Animals Act, 1910, (Note: Diseases of Animals Act 1910 (10 Edw. 7 & 1 Geo. 5. c. 20)) in respect of the Exportation of Horses. (Repealed by Diseases of Animals Act 1950 (14 Geo. 6. c. 36))
Trade Marks Act 1914 (repealed)	4 & 5 Geo. 5. c. 16	7 August 1914
An Act to amend section sixty-four of the Trade Marks Act, 1905. (Note: Trade Marks Act 1905 (5 Edw. 7. c. 15)) (Repealed by Trade Marks (Amendment) Act 1937 (1 Edw. 8 & 1 Geo. 6. c. 49))
British Nationality and Status of Aliens Act 1914 renamed to Status of Aliens Act 1914	4 & 5 Geo. 5. c. 17	7 August 1914
An Act to consolidate and amend the Enactments relating to British Nationality and the Status of Aliens.
Patents and Designs Act 1914 (repealed)	4 & 5 Geo. 5. c. 18	7 August 1914
An Act to amend section ninety-one of the Patents and Designs Act, 1907. (Note: Patents and Designs Act 1907 (7 Edw. 7. c. 29)) (Repealed by Patents, Designs and Marks Act 1986 (c. 39))
Isle of Man (Customs) Act 1914 (repealed)	4 & 5 Geo. 5. c. 19	7 August 1914
An Act to amend the Law with respect to Customs in the Isle of Man. (Repealed by Statute Law Revision Act 1927 (17 & 18 Geo. 5. c. 42))
Education (Provision of Meals) Act 1914 (repealed)	4 & 5 Geo. 5. c. 20	7 August 1914
An Act to amend the Education (Provision of Meals) Act, 1906. (Note: Education (Provision of Meals) Act 1906 (6 Edw. 7. c. 57)) (Repealed by Education Act 1921 (11 & 12 Geo. 5. c. 51))
County and Borough Councils (Qualification) Act 1914 (repealed)	4 & 5 Geo. 5. c. 21	7 August 1914
An Act to extend the Qualification for Membership of County and Borough Councils. (Repealed by Local Government Act 1933 (23 & 24 Geo. 5. c. 51) and London Government Act 1939 (2 & 3 Geo. 6. c. 40))
Coal Mines Act 1914 (repealed)	4 & 5 Geo. 5. c. 22	7 August 1914
An Act to amend the Coal Mines Act, 1911. (Note: Coal Mines Act 1911 (1 & 2 Geo. 5. c. 50)) (Repealed for England and Wales and Scotland by Mines and Quarries Act 1954 (2 & 3 Eliz. 2. c. 70) and for Northern Ireland by Mines Act (Northern Ireland) 1969 (c. 6 (N.I.)))
Expiring Laws Continuance Act 1914 (repealed)	4 & 5 Geo. 5. c. 23	7 August 1914
An Act to continue various Expiring Laws. (Repealed by Statute Law Revision Act 1927 (17 & 18 Geo. 5. c. 42))
Appropriation Act 1914 (repealed)	4 & 5 Geo. 5. c. 24	7 August 1914
An Act to apply a sum out of the Consolidated Fund to the service of the year ending on the thirty-first day of March one thousand nine hundred and fifteen, and to appropriate the Supplies granted in this Session of Parliament. (Repealed by Statute Law Revision Act 1927 (17 & 18 Geo. 5. c. 42))
Electoral Disabilities (Naval and Military Service) Removal Act 1914 (repealed)	4 & 5 Geo. 5. c. 25	7 August 1914
An Act to remove electoral disabilities which may arise in the case of members of the Reserve and Territorial Forces and in the case of Volunteers by reason of absence on the Naval or Military service of the Crown. (Repealed by Representation of the People Act 1918 (7 & 8 Geo. 5. c. 64))
Army (Supply of Food, Forage, and Stores) Act 1914 (repealed)	4 & 5 Geo. 5. c. 26	7 August 1914
An Act to enable Food, Forage, and Stores for His Majesty's Forces to be requisitioned in cases of emergency. (Repealed by Revision of the Army and Air Force Acts (Transitional Provisions) Act 1955 (3 & 4 Eliz. 2. c. 20))
Patents, Designs, and Trade Marks (Temporary Rules) Act 1914 (repealed)	4 & 5 Geo. 5. c. 27	7 August 1914
An Act to exited the powers of the Board of Trade during the continuance of the present hostilities to make Rules under the Patents and Designs Act, 1907, and the Trade Marks Act, 1905. (Repealed by Statute Law Revision Act 1927 (17 & 18 Geo. 5. c. 42))
Mall Approach (Improvement) Act 1914 (repealed)	4 & 5 Geo. 5. c. 28	7 August 1914
An Act to enable the London County Council to acquire certain lands and execute certain improvements in the City of Westminster, and for other purposes in connexion therewith. (Repealed by Local Law (Greater London Council and Inner London Boroughs) Order 1965 (SI 1965/540))
Defence of the Realm Act 1914 (repealed)	4 & 5 Geo. 5. c. 29	8 August 1914
An Act to confer on His Majesty in Council power to make Regulations during the present War for the Defence of the Realm. (Repealed by Defence of the Realm Consolidation Act 1914 (5 & 6 Geo. 5. c. 8))
Injuries in War (Compensation) Act 1914 (repealed)	4 & 5 Geo. 5. c. 30	10 August 1914
An Act to provide for the grant of pensions and other allowances to certain persons if injured whilst employed in connexion with warlike operations, and to their dependants, and for purposes connected therewith. (Repealed by Statute Law (Repeals) Act 2008 (c. 12))
Housing Act 1914 (repealed)	4 & 5 Geo. 5. c. 31	10 August 1914
An Act to make provision with respect to the Housing of Persons employed by or on behalf of Government Departments where sufficient dwelling accommodation is not available. (Repealed for England and Wales by Housing (Consequential Provisions) Act 1985 (c. 71) and for Scotland by Housing (Scotland) Act 1987 (c. 26))
Labourers (Ireland) Act 1914 (repealed)	4 & 5 Geo. 5. c. 32	10 August 1914
An Act to amend the Law relating to Labourers in Ireland. (Repealed by Statute Law Revision Act 1927 (17 & 18 Geo. 5. c. 42) and Exchequer and Financial Provisions Act (Northern Ireland) 1949 (c. 12 (N.I.)))
Public Works Loans Act 1914 (repealed)	4 & 5 Geo. 5. c. 33	10 August 1914
An Act to grant Money for the purpose of certain Local Loans out of the Local Loans Fund, and for other purposes relating to Local Loans. (Repealed by Housing Act 1925 (15 & 16 Geo. 5. c. 14), Housing (Scotland) Act 1925 (15 & 16 Geo. 5. c. 15) and Statute Law Revision Act 1927 (17 & 18 Geo. 5. c. 42))
Police Reservists (Allowances) Act 1914 (repealed)	4 & 5 Geo. 5. c. 34	10 August 1914
An Act to authorise the grant out of Police Funds of certain Allowances and Gratuities in respect of Police Reservists who are called out upon Permanent Service. (Repealed by Statute Law (Repeals) Act 1989 (c. 43))
Education (Provision of Meals) (Ireland) Act 1914 (repealed)	4 & 5 Geo. 5. c. 35	10 August 1914
An Act to enable Local Authorities in Ireland to provide Meals for School Children. (Repealed by Education Act (Northern Ireland) 1923 (13 & 14 Geo. 5. c. 21 (N.I.)))
Osborne Estate Act 1914 (repealed)	4 & 5 Geo. 5. c. 36	10 August 1914
An Act to authorise the Extension of the Classes of Persons for whose benefit part of Osborne House is to be used and for other purposes connected therewith. (Repealed by Enterprise and Regulatory Reform Act 2013 (c. 24))
Anglo-Persian Oil Company (Acquisition of Capital) Act 1914 (repealed)	4 & 5 Geo. 5. c. 37	10 August 1914
An Act to provision Money for the purpose of the Acquisition or Share or Loan Capital of the Anglo-Persian Oil Company, Limited. (Repealed by Statute Law Revision Act 1927 (17 & 18 Geo. 5. c. 42))
East African Protectorates (Loans) Act 1914 (repealed)	4 & 5 Geo. 5. c. 38	10 August 1914
An Act to authorise certain Loans to the Protectorates of British East Africa, Nyasaland, and Uganda. (Repealed by Statute Law Revision Act 1958 (6 & 7 Eliz. 2. c. 46))
County, Town, and Parish Councils (Qualification) (Scotland) Act 1914 (repealed)	4 & 5 Geo. 5. c. 39	10 August 1914
An Act to extend the Qualification for Membership of County, Town, and Parish councils in Scotland. (Repealed by Sex Disqualification (Removal) Act 1919 (9 & 10 Geo. 5. c. 71), Local Government (Scotland) Act 1929 (19 & 20 Geo. 5. c. 25) and Local Government (Scotland) Act 1947 (10 & 11 Geo. 6. c. 43))
Diseases of Animals (Ireland) Act 1914 (repealed)	4 & 5 Geo. 5. c. 40	10 August 1914
An Act to amend Subsection (5) of Section seventy-one of the Diseases of Animals Act, 1894. (Note: Diseases of Animals Act 1894 (57 & 58 Vict. c. 57)) (Repealed by Administrative Provisions Act (Northern Ireland) 1926 (16 Geo. 5. c. 4 (N.I.)))
Intermediate Education (Ireland) Act 1914 (repealed)	4 & 5 Geo. 5. c. 41	10 August 1914
An Act to amend the Law relating to Intermediate Education in Ireland and for other purposes connected therewith. (Repealed by Education Act (Northern Ireland) 1923 (13 & 14 Geo. 5. c. 21 (N.I.)))
Merchant Shipping (Certificates) Act 1914 (repealed)	4 & 5 Geo. 5. c. 42	10 August 1914
An Act to amend the Law relating to Examinations for Certificates of Competency. (Repealed by Merchant Shipping Act 1970 (c. 36))
Entail (Scotland) Act 1914	4 & 5 Geo. 5. c. 43	10 August 1914
An Act to amend the Law of Entail in Scotland.
Metropolitan Police (Employment in Scotland) Act 1914	4 & 5 Geo. 5. c. 44	10 August 1914
An Act to extend the Metropolitan Police Act, 1860, (Note: Metropolitan Police Act 1860 (23 & 24 Vict. c. 135)) to Scotland.
Elementary Education (Defective and Epileptic Children) Act 1914 (repealed)	4 & 5 Geo. 5. c. 45	10 August 1914
An Act to amend the Law relating to the Education of Defective and Epileptic Children in England and Wales. (Repealed by Education Act 1921 (11 & 12 Geo. 5. c. 51))
Milk and Dairies (Scotland) Act 1914 (repealed)	4 & 5 Geo. 5. c. 46	10 August 1914
An Act to ensure the Purity of Milk Supplies and to regulate Dairies in Scotland, and for other purposes connected therewith. (Repealed by Food Safety Act 1990 (c. 16))
Deeds of Arrangement Act 1914 (repealed)	4 & 5 Geo. 5. c. 47	10 August 1914
An Act to consolidate the Law relating to Deeds of Arrangement. (Repealed by Deregulation Act 2015 (c. 20))
Feudal Casualties (Scotland) Act 1914 (repealed)	4 & 5 Geo. 5. c. 48	10 August 1914
An Act to provide for the redemption and extinction of Casualties incident to Feus in Scotland. (Repealed by Abolition of Feudal Tenure etc. (Scotland) Act 2000 (asp 5))
Milk and Dairies Act 1914 (repealed)	4 & 5 Geo. 5. c. 49	10 August 1914
An Act to make better provision with respect to the Sale of Milk and the Regulation of Dairies. (Repealed by Milk and Dairies (Consolidation) Act 1915 (5 & 6 Geo. 5. c. 66) and Milk and Dairies (Amendment) Act 1922 (12 & 13 Geo. 5. c. 54))
Merchant Shipping (Convention) Act 1914 (repealed)	4 & 5 Geo. 5. c. 50	10 August 1914
An Act to make such amendments of the Law relating to Merchant Shipping as are necessary or expedient to give effect to an International Convention for the Safety of Life at Sea, signed in London on January the twentieth, nineteen hundred and fourteen, and for purposes incidental thereto. (Repealed for the United Kingdom by Merchant Shipping (Safety and Load Line Conventions) Act 1932 (22 & 23 Geo. 5. c. 9) and for the Isle of Man by Statute Law Revision (Isle of Man) Act 1991 (c. 61))
Unreasonable Withholding of Food Supplies Act 1914 (repealed)	4 & 5 Geo. 5. c. 51	10 August 1914
An Act to enable the Board of Trade during the present War to take possession of Foodstuffs unreasonably withheld. (Repealed by Articles of Commerce (Returns, &c.) Act 1914 (4 & 5 Geo. 5. c. 65))
Housing (No. 2) Act 1914 (repealed)	4 & 5 Geo. 5. c. 52	10 August 1914
An Act to give the Board of Agriculture and Fisheries in Agricultural districts and the Local Government Board elsewhere powers with respect to Housing and to make similar provision for Scotland. (Repealed by Statute Law Revision Act 1927 (17 & 18 Geo. 5. c. 42))
Special Constables (Scotland) Act 1914 (repealed)	4 & 5 Geo. 5. c. 53	10 August 1914
An Act to amend and extend the law relating to the Appointment of Special Constables in Scotland. (Repealed by Police (Scotland) Act 1956 (4 & 5 Eliz. 2. c. 26))
Constabulary and Police (Ireland) Act 1914 (repealed)	4 & 5 Geo. 5. c. 54	10 August 1914
An Act to amend the Law relating to the Pay and Pensions of the Royal Irish Constabulary and Dublin Metropolitan Police and for other purposes in relation to those Forces. (Repealed by Statute Law Revision Act 1927 (17 & 18 Geo. 5. c. 42) and Statute Law Revision Act (Northern Ireland) 1954 (c. 35 (N.I.)))
River Navigation Improvement (Ireland) Act 1914 (repealed)	4 & 5 Geo. 5. c. 55	10 August 1914
An Act to provide for the Improvement of the Navigation of Rivers in Ireland. (Repealed by Statute Law Revision Act (Northern Ireland) 1954 (c. 35 (N.I.)))
Charitable Trusts Act 1914 (repealed)	4 & 5 Geo. 5. c. 56	10 August 1914
An Act to authorise the extension of the Area for the benefit of which Charities in a Town may be applied, and the variation of the purposes for which dole Charities may be applied in certain cases. (Repealed by Charities Act 1960 (8 & 9 Eliz. 2. c. 58))
National Insurance (Part II. Amendment) Act 1914 (repealed)	4 & 5 Geo. 5. c. 57	10 August 1914
An Act to amend Part II. of the National Insurance Act, 1911. (Note: National Insurance Act 1911 (1 & 2 Geo. 5. c. 55)) (Repealed by Unemployment Insurance Act 1920 (10 & 11 Geo. 5. c. 30))
Criminal Justice Administration Act 1914	4 & 5 Geo. 5. c. 58	10 August 1914
An Act to diminish the number of cases committed to prison, to amend the Law with respect to the treatment and punishment of young offenders, and otherwise to improve the Administration of Criminal Justice.
Bankruptcy Act 1914	4 & 5 Geo. 5. c. 59	10 August 1914
An Act to consolidate the Law relating to Bankruptcy. (Repealed for England and Wales by Insolvency Act 1985 (c. 65) and for the Isle of Man by Statute Law Revision (Isle of Man) Act 1991 (c. 61))
War Loan Act 1914 (repealed)	4 & 5 Geo. 5. c. 60	28 August 1914
An Act to provide for raising Money for the present War. (Repealed by National Debt Act 1958 (7 & 8 Eliz. 2. c. 6))
Special Constables Act 1914 (repealed)	4 & 5 Geo. 5. c. 61	28 August 1914
An Act to enable His Majesty, by Order in Council, to make regulations with respect to Special Constables appointed during the present war. (Repealed for England and Wales by Police Act 1964 (c. 48), for Scotland by Police (Scotland) Act 1956 (4 & 5 Eliz. 2. c. 26) and for Northern Ireland by Police Act (Northern Ireland) 1970 (c. 9 (N.I.)))
Isle of Man (War Legislation) Act 1914 (repealed)	4 & 5 Geo. 5. c. 62	28 August 1914
An Act to enable His Majesty, by Order in Council, to extend to the Isle of Man Acts passed in connection with the present War. (Repealed by Statute Law Revision Act 1927 (17 & 18 Geo. 5. c. 42))
Defence of the Realm (No. 2) Act 1914 (repealed)	4 & 5 Geo. 5. c. 63	28 August 1914
An Act to amend the Defence of the Realm Act, 1914. (Note: Defence of the Realm Act 1914 (4 & 5 Geo. 5. c. 29)) (Repealed by Defence of the Realm Consolidation Act 1914 (5 & 6 Geo. 5. c. 8))
Customs (Exportation Prohibition) Act 1914 (Note: This act has the same short title as the Customs (Exportation Prohibition) Act 1914 (5 & 6 Geo. 5. c. 2)) (repealed)	4 & 5 Geo. 5. c. 64	28 August 1914
An Act to extend and amend section eight of the Customs and Inland Revenue Act, 1879. (Note: Customs and Inland Revenue Act 1879 (42 & 43 Vict. c. 21)) (Repealed by Statute Law (Repeals) Act 1986 (c. 12))
Articles of Commerce (Returns, &c.) Act 1914 (repealed)	4 & 5 Geo. 5. c. 65	28 August 1914
An Act to give Powers in connection with the present War to obtain information as to Stocks of Articles of Commerce, and for enabling Possession to be taken of any such Articles unreasonably withheld. (Repealed by Statute Law Revision Act 1927 (17 & 18 Geo. 5. c. 42))
Elementary School Teachers (War Service Superannuation) Act 1914 (repealed)	4 & 5 Geo. 5. c. 66	28 August 1914
An Act to enable Certificated Teachers to reckon Service in connection with the present War as recorded Service for the purpose of the Acts relating to Elementary School Teachers' Superannuation. (Repealed by Statute Law Revision Act 1927 (17 & 18 Geo. 5. c. 42))
Education (Scotland) (War Service Superannuation) Act 1914 (repealed)	4 & 5 Geo. 5. c. 67	28 August 1914
An Act to authorise an amendment of the Superannuation Scheme for Teachers in Scotland for the purpose of enabling service in connection with the present War to be reckoned as recorded service under the Scheme. (Repealed by Statute Law Revision Act 1927 (17 & 18 Geo. 5. c. 42))
Education (Scotland) (Provision of Meals) Act 1914 (repealed)	4 & 5 Geo. 5. c. 68	28 August 1914
An Act to remove doubts as to the interpretation of the Education (Scotland) Act, 1908, (Note: Education (Scotland) Act 1908 (8 Edw. 7. c. 63)) in regard to the provision of meals for school children. (Repealed by Education (Scotland) Act 1942 (5 & 6 Geo. 6. c. 5))
Police (Scotland) (Limit of Age) Act 1914 (repealed)	4 & 5 Geo. 5. c. 69	28 August 1914
An Act to amend the provisions of the Acts relating to the Police in Scotland during the continuance of the present War with respect to age at date of appointment to a police force. (Repealed by Statute Law Revision Act 1927 (17 & 18 Geo. 5. c. 42))
Naval Billeting, &c. Act 1914 (repealed)	4 & 5 Geo. 5. c. 70	28 August 1914
An Act to extend to the Naval Forces the provisions of the Army Act (Note: Army Act 1881 (44 & 45 Vict. c. 58)) relating to the Billeting, and Impressment of Carriages, &c. in cases of emergency. (Repealed by Armed Forces Act 1971 (c. 33))
Housing (No. 2) (Amendment) Act 1914 (repealed)	4 & 5 Geo. 5. c. 71	28 August 1914
An Act to extend the Housing (No. 2) Act, 1914, (Note: Housing (No. 2) Act 1914 (4 & 5 Geo. 5. c. 52)) to Ireland. (Repealed by Statute Law Revision Act 1927 (17 & 18 Geo. 5. c. 42))
Currency and Bank Notes (Amendment) Act 1914 (repealed)	4 & 5 Geo. 5. c. 72	28 August 1914
An Act to amend the Currency and Bank Notes Act, 1914. (Note: Currency and Bank Notes Act 1914 (4 & 5 Geo. 5. c. 14)) (Repealed by Currency and Bank Notes Act 1928 (18 & 19 Geo. 5. c. 13))
Patents, Designs, and Trade Marks Temporary Rules (Amendment) Act 1914 (repealed)	4 & 5 Geo. 5. c. 73	28 August 1914
An Act to amend the Patents, Designs, and Trade Marks (Temporary Rules) Act, 1914. (Note: Patents, Designs, and Trade Marks (Temporary Rules) Act 1914 (4 & 5 Geo. 5. c. 27)) (Repealed by Statute Law Revision Act 1927 (17 & 18 Geo. 5. c. 42))
Local Government (Adjustments) (Scotland) Act 1914 (repealed)	4 & 5 Geo. 5. c. 74	28 August 1914
An Act to amend the Law relating to the Adjustment of Financial Relations between Local Government Areas in Scotland on the alteration of the Boundaries thereof. (Repealed by Local Government (Scotland) Act 1947 (10 & 11 Geo. 6. c. 43))
Slaughter of Animals Act 1914 (repealed)	4 & 5 Geo. 5. c. 75	31 August 1914
An Act to authorise the regulation and restriction of the slaughter of animals used for food. (Repealed by Maintenance of Live Stock Act 1915 (5 & 6 Geo. 5. c. 65))
Death Duties (Killed in War) Act 1914 (repealed)	4 & 5 Geo. 5. c. 76	31 August 1914
An Act to extend and vary as respects the present War the relief from Death Duties given under section fourteen of the Finance Act, 1900. (Note: Finance Act 1900 (63 & 64 Vict. c. 7)) (Repealed by Finance Act 1975 (c. 7))
Intoxicating Liquor (Temporary Restriction) Act 1914 (repealed)	4 & 5 Geo. 5. c. 77	31 August 1914
An Act to enable orders to be made in connection with the present war for restricting the sale or consumption of intoxicating liquor. (Repealed by Licensing Act 1921 (11 & 12 Geo. 5. c. 42))
Courts (Emergency Powers) Act 1914 (repealed)	4 & 5 Geo. 5. c. 78	31 August 1914
An Act to give, in connexion with the present War, further powers to Courts in relation to the remedies for the recovery of money, and in relation to other similar matters. (Repealed by Statute Law (Repeals) Act 1976 (c. 16))
Prize Courts (Egypt, Zanzibar, and Cyprus) Act 1914 (repealed)	4 & 5 Geo. 5. c. 79	18 September 1914
An Act to provide for the exercise of Prize Jurisdiction by certain British Courts in Egypt, Zanzibar, and Cyprus, in respect of the present War. (Repealed by Statute Law Revision Act 1927 (17 & 18 Geo. 5. c. 42))
Police Constables (Naval and Military Service) Act 1914 (repealed)	4 & 5 Geo. 5. c. 80	18 September 1914
An Act to amend the Police Reservists (Allowances) Act, 1914, (Note: Police Reservists (Allowances) Act 1914 (4 & 5 Geo. 5. c. 34)) and to extend the provisions of that Act and certain other enactments relating to police reservists to certain constables not being reservists. (Repealed by Police Pensions Act 1948 (11 & 12 Geo. 6. c. 24))
National Insurance (Navy and Army) Act 1914 (repealed)	4 & 5 Geo. 5. c. 81	18 September 1914
An Act to amend section forty-six of the National Insurance Act, 1911, as respects certain officers, warrant officers, and soldiers. (Repealed by Statute Law Revision Act 1927 (17 & 18 Geo. 5. c. 42))
Bills of Exchange Act 1914 (repealed)	4 & 5 Geo. 5. c. 82	18 September 1914
An Act to make provision in connection with the present war with respect to Bills of Exchange payable outside the British Islands. (Repealed by Statute Law Revision Act 1927 (17 & 18 Geo. 5. c. 42))
Army Pensions Act 1914 (repealed)	4 & 5 Geo. 5. c. 83	18 September 1914
An Act to enable the Army Council to fix the mode of payment of Military Pensions. (Repealed by Armed Forces Act 1981 (c. 55))
Irish Police Constables (Naval and Military Service) Act 1914 (repealed)	4 & 5 Geo. 5. c. 84	18 September 1914
An Act to make provision with respect to Constables of the Royal Irish Constabulary and Dublin Metropolitan Police who are Reservists or join the Naval or Military Forces. (Repealed by Statute Law Revision Act (Northern Ireland) 1954 (c. 35 (N.I.)))
Rates (Proceedings for Recovery) Act 1914 (repealed)	4 & 5 Geo. 5. c. 85	18 September 1914
An Act to extend the time within which proceedings may be taken for the recovery of Rates. (Repealed by Statute Law Revision Act 1927 (17 & 18 Geo. 5. c. 42))
Superannuation Act 1914 (repealed)	4 & 5 Geo. 5. c. 86	18 September 1914
An Act to amend the Superannuation Acts, 1834 to 1909. (Repealed by Superannuation Act 1965 (c. 74))
Trading with the Enemy Act 1914 (repealed)	4 & 5 Geo. 5. c. 87	18 September 1914
An Act to make provision with respect to penalties for Trading with the Enemy, and other purposes connected therewith. (Repealed by Trading with the Enemy Act 1939 (2 & 3 Geo. 6. c. 89))
Suspensory Act 1914 (repealed)	4 & 5 Geo. 5. c. 88	18 September 1914
An Act to suspend the operation of the Government of Ireland Act, 1914, (Note: Government of Ireland Act 1914 (4 & 5 Geo. 5. c. 90)) and the Welsh Church Act, 1914. (Note: Welsh Church Act 1914 (4 & 5 Geo. 5. c. 91)) (Repealed by Statute Law Revision Act 1927 (17 & 18 Geo. 5. c. 42))
Navy (Pledging of Certificates, &c.) Act 1914 (repealed)	4 & 5 Geo. 5. c. 89	18 September 1914
An Act to prevent the Disposal or Pledging of Certificates, Naval Uniforms, or other Property, and for purposes connected therewith. (Repealed by Naval Discipline Act 1957 (5 & 6 Eliz. 2. c. 53))
Government of Ireland Act 1914 (repealed)	4 & 5 Geo. 5. c. 90	18 September 1914
An Act to amend the provision for the Government of Ireland. (Repealed by Government of Ireland Act 1920 (10 & 11 Geo. 5. c. 67))
Welsh Church Act 1914	4 & 5 Geo. 5. c. 91	18 September 1914
An Act to terminate the establishment of the Church of England in Wales and Monmouthshire, and to make provision in respect of the Temporalities thereof, and for other purposes in connection with the matters aforesaid.

=== Local acts ===
Short title	Citation	Royal assent
Long title
Scottish Insurance Companies (Superannuation Fund) Order Confirmation Act 1914	4 & 5 Geo. 5. c. i	30 April 1914
An Act to confirm a Provisional Order under the Private Legislation Procedure (Scotland) Act 1899 (Note: Private Legislation Procedure (Scotland) Act 1899 (62 & 63 Vict. c. 47)) relating to the Scottish Insurance Companies (Superannuation Fund).
	Scottish Insurance Companies (Superannuation Fund) Order 1914 Provisional Order to establish a Fund for the provision of allowances on superannuation or disablement for the benefit of the employees of certain statutory Scottish Insurance Companies to incorporate a managing body to hold and administer the Fund to regulate contributions and benefits to provide for the admission to the Fund of other statutory companies carrying on insurance business in Scotland and for other purposes.	
Alexander Scott's Hospital and the North of Scotland College of Agriculture Order Confirmation Act 1914	4 & 5 Geo. 5. c. ii	30 April 1914
An Act to confirm a Provisional Order under the Private Legislation Procedure (Scotland) Act 1899 relating to Alexander Scott's Hospital and the North of Scotland College of Agriculture.
	Alexander Scott's Hospital and the North of Scotland College of Agriculture Order 1914 Provisional Order to authorise the sale and purchase of the Estate of Craibstone in the county of Aberdeen to make provision as to the investment of the proceeds of sale and for other purposes.	
East Ham Corporation Act 1914	4 & 5 Geo. 5. c. iii	30 April 1914
An Act to constitute the borough of East Ham in the county of Essex a county borough to make provision in regard to the granting of superannuation allowances to officers and servants of the Corporation to make further provision in regard to the electricity undertaking of the Corporation and the health local government and improvement of the borough and for other purposes.
South Metropolitan Cemetery Company Act 1914	4 & 5 Geo. 5. c. iv	30 April 1914
An Act to confer further powers upon the South Metropolitan Cemetery Company and for other purposes.
Crystal Palace Act 1914	4 & 5 Geo. 5. c. v	30 April 1914
An Act to constitute a body of Trustees for the purpose of acquiring the Crystal Palace and Park and to empower them to hold and manage the same as a place of public resort and recreation and for other purposes.
British Gas Light Company (Hull Station) Act 1914 (repealed)	4 & 5 Geo. 5. c. vi	30 April 1914
An Act for empowering the British Gas Light Company Limited to expend further capital at Kingston-upon-Hull. (Repealed by Hull Gas Order 1938 (SR&O 1938/711))
Colonial and Foreign Banks Guarantee Corporation Act 1914	4 & 5 Geo. 5. c. vii	30 April 1914
An Act to amend the Colonial and Foreign Banks Guarantee Fund Incorporation Act 1899 (Note: Colonial and Foreign Banks Guarantee Fund Incorporation Act 1899 (62 & 63 Vict. c. lxv)) and for other purposes.
Bengal and North Western Railway Company Act 1914 (repealed)	4 & 5 Geo. 5. c. viii	8 July 1914
An Act to empower the Bengal and North Western Railway Company Limited to redeem a portion of its existing capital and for other purposes. (Repealed by Statute Law (Repeals) Act 2013 (c. 2))
Fishguard and Rosslare Railways and Harbours Act 1914	4 & 5 Geo. 5. c. ix	8 July 1914
An Act to empower the Fishguard and Rosslare Railways and Harbours Company to construct additional harbour works at Fishguard and to abandon certain authorised harbour works and railways in connexion therewith and to authorise the Great Western Railway Company to subscribe to the capital of the said Company and for other purposes.
Corn Exchange Act 1914 (repealed)	4 & 5 Geo. 5. c. x	8 July 1914
An Act to make further provision as to the affairs of the Corn Exchange Company and for regulating the user of the Corn Exchange (Mark Lane). (Repealed by Corn Exchange Act 1975 (c. xii))
Rhymney Railway Act 1914	4 & 5 Geo. 5. c. xi	8 July 1914
An Act to extend the time for the purchase of lands for and for the completion of certain railways by the Rhymney Railway Company and for other purposes.
Chelsea Borough Council (Superannuation and Pensions) Act 1914 (repealed)	4 & 5 Geo. 5. c. xii	8 July 1914
An Act to provide for the granting of superannuation allowances to the officers and pensions to the servants of the Metropolitan Borough of Chelsea and for other purposes. (Repealed by Local Law (Greater London Council and Inner London Boroughs) Order 1965 (SI 1965/540))
South Bank and Normanby Gas Act 1914	4 & 5 Geo. 5. c. xiii	8 July 1914
An Act to extend the limits of supply of the South Bank and Normanby Gaslight and Coke Company Limited to repeal the powers of the Middlesbrough Corporation to supply gas within the existing and extended limits of supply of that Company and for other purposes.
Chiswick Urban District Council Act 1914 (repealed)	4 & 5 Geo. 5. c. xiv	8 July 1914
An Act to confer powers upon the Urban District Council of Chiswick in relation to the acquisition of lands and for other purposes. (Repealed by Local Law (North West London Boroughs) Order 1965 (SI 1965/533))
Didcot, Newbury and Southampton Railway Act 1914	4 & 5 Geo. 5. c. xv	8 July 1914
An Act to confer further powers on the Didcot Newbury and Southampton Railway Company.
Chesterfield Corporation Act 1914 (repealed)	4 & 5 Geo. 5. c. xvi	8 July 1914
An Act to authorise the Corporation of Chesterfield to construct and work additional tramways to execute certain street works and improvements to extend their area for the supply of electricity to make further provision for the improvement local government and health of the borough of Chesterfield and for other purposes. (Repealed by Chesterfield Corporation Act 1923 (13 & 14 Geo. 5. c. xcix))
Cardiff Railway Act 1914	4 & 5 Geo. 5. c. xvii	8 July 1914
An Act to extend the time limited by the Bute Docks and Cardiff Railway Acts for the purchase of certain lands and for the completion of certain works and for other purposes.
Port of London (Amendment) Act 1914 (repealed)	4 & 5 Geo. 5. c. xviii	8 July 1914
An Act to amend the Port of London Act 1908 (Note: Port of London Act 1908 (8 Edw. 7. c. 68)) and to extend the powers of raising money under such Act to confer further powers on the Port of London Authority and for other purposes. (Repealed by Port of London (Consolidation) Act 1920 (10 & 11 Geo. 5. c. clxxiii))
Nottingham Mechanics Institution (Amendment) Act 1914	4 & 5 Geo. 5. c. xix	8 July 1914
An Act to amend the Nottingham Mechanics Institution Act 1912. (Note: Nottingham Mechanics Institution Act 1912 (2 & 3 Geo. 5. c. xciv))
Cleckheaton Urban District Council Act 1914 (repealed)	4 & 5 Geo. 5. c. xx	8 July 1914
An Act to provide for the transfer to the urban district council of Cleckheaton of so much of the Gas Undertaking of the Bradford Corporation as is situate within the Urban District of Cleckheaton to extend and define the limits of the Council for the supply of Gas and to confer further powers upon the Council in relation to their Gas Undertaking to authorise the Council to provide and run Motor Omnibuses and to make further and better provision with regard to the Improvement Health and Local Government of the District and for other purposes. (Repealed by West Yorkshire Act 1980 (c. xiv))
Mablethorpe Urban District Council Act 1914	4 & 5 Geo. 5. c. xxi	8 July 1914
An Act to confer powers upon the urban district council of Mablethorpe in the county of Lincoln with respect to certain lands locally known as Sandhills or Dunes and situate within the urban district and for other purposes.
Taff Vale Railway Act 1914	4 & 5 Geo. 5. c. xxii	8 July 1914
An Act to extend the time limited by the Taff Vale Railway Act 1912 (Note: Taff Vale Railway Act 1912 (2 & 3 Geo. 5. c. xxxiii)) for the purchase of certain lands and the completion of certain railways.
South Staffordshire Mines Drainage Act 1914	4 & 5 Geo. 5. c. xxiii	8 July 1914
An Act to confer powers upon the South Staffordshire Mines Drainage Commissioners for the borrowing of moneys and the purchase and sale of lands to confirm an agreement between the said Commissioners the Company of Proprietors of the Birmingham Canal Navigations and the Public Works Loan Commissioners to vary and amend the provisions of the South Staffordshire Mines Drainage Acts 1891 (Note: South Staffordshire Mines Drainage Act 1891 (54 & 55 Vict. c. clxxxv)) 1894 (Note: South Staffordshire Mines Drainage Act 1894 (57 & 58 Vict. c. clxxi)) and 1904 (Note: South Staffordshire Mines Drainage Act 1904 (4 Edw. 7. c. xlvii)) and for other purposes.
Abertillery and District Water Board Act 1914 (repealed)	4 & 5 Geo. 5. c. xxiv	8 July 1914
An Act to authorise the Abertillery and District Water Board to construct an additional reservoir and for other purposes. (Repealed by Gwent Water Board Order 1969 (SI 1969/1475))
Stone Gas and Electricity Act 1914	4 & 5 Geo. 5. c. xxv	8 July 1914
An Act to empower the Stone Gas Light and Coke Company Limited to supply electricity and to confer further powers on and to change the name of the Company and for other purposes.
Bristol Waterworks Act 1914	4 & 5 Geo. 5. c. xxvi	8 July 1914
An Act to empower the Bristol Waterworks Company to raise additional capital and for other purposes.
St. George's Hospital Act 1914	4 & 5 Geo. 5. c. xxvii	8 July 1914
An Act to empower the President Vice-Presidents Treasurers and Governors of St. George's Hospital to acquire lands for and to erect a new hospital to authorise the sale and disposal of the site of St. George's Hospital to provide for agreements with the Governors of Westminster Hospital for amalgamation and removal to a joint site of St. George's and Westminster Hospitals and for other purposes.
Butterley Company Limited Act 1914	4 & 5 Geo. 5. c. xxviii	8 July 1914
An Act to constitute the Butterley Company Limited a company limited by shares to amend the memorandum and articles of association and increase the capital of the Company and for other purposes.
Kidsgrove Gas Act 1914	4 & 5 Geo. 5. c. xxix	8 July 1914
An Act to alter and define the limits of the Kidsgrove Gaslight Company for the supply of gas to confer further powers on the Company and for other purposes.
London Electric Railway Act 1914	4 & 5 Geo. 5. c. xxx	8 July 1914
An Act to empower the London Electric Railway Company to construct new subways and for other purposes.
Mold and Denbigh Junction Railway Act 1914	4 & 5 Geo. 5. c. xxxi	8 July 1914
An Act to authorise the Mold and Denbigh Junction Railway Company to improve its undertaking to raise further money and for other purposes.
Central London Railway Act 1914	4 & 5 Geo. 5. c. xxxii	8 July 1914
An Act to empower the Central London Railway Company to enlarge a portion of their railway tunnels to construct new subways and works and for other purposes.
Aire and Calder Navigation Act 1914	4 & 5 Geo. 5. c. xxxiii	8 July 1914
An Act to authorise the Undertakers of the Aire and Calder Navigation to construct a training wall or embankment in the River Ouse to confer further powers on the Undertakers in connection with their undertaking to amend the Acts relating thereto and for other purposes.
Ashington Urban District Council Act 1914	4 & 5 Geo. 5. c. xxxiv	8 July 1914
An Act to empower the urban district council of Ashington to supply gas within their district and the adjoining neighbourhood and for other purposes.
Rhondda and Swansea Bay Railway Act 1914	4 & 5 Geo. 5. c. xxxv	8 July 1914
An Act to confer further powers upon the Rhondda and Swansea Bay Railway Company and for other purposes.
Llanfaelog Water Act 1914 (repealed)	4 & 5 Geo. 5. c. xxxvi	8 July 1914
An Act to empower the Valley Rural District Council to obtain a supply of water from the stream known as the Bodsuran stream and from springs and streams in the neighbourhood thereof in the parish of Llechcynfarwydd in the county of Anglesey and to supply water in the parish of Llanfaelog and for other purposes. (Repealed by Anglesey County Council (Water, &c.) Act 1944 (7 & 8 Geo. 6. c. xx))
Rhymney and Aber Valleys Gas and Water Act 1914	4 & 5 Geo. 5. c. xxxvii	8 July 1914
An Act to empower the Rhymney and Aber Valleys Gas and Water Company to acquire additional lands for gas and water purposes to raise additional capital to create a further amount of debenture stock and for other purposes.
Belfast Corporation Act 1914	4 & 5 Geo. 5. c. xxxviii	8 July 1914
An Act to empower the Lord Mayor Aldermen and Citizens of the city of Belfast to raise additional moneys for certain purposes connected with their Tramways Undertaking.
Railway Clearing System Superannuation Fund Act 1914	4 & 5 Geo. 5. c. xxxix	8 July 1914
An Act to provide for an increase of the contributions to the Railway Clearing System Superannuation Fund by the Railway Clearing House certain railway companies and joint committees the Clearing House Committee (Ireland) and certain contributing members of the Fund and for other purposes.
Mansfield Railway Act 1914	4 & 5 Geo. 5. c. xl	8 July 1914
An Act to confer further powers upon the Mansfield Railway Company with reference to the construction of works and the acquisition of lands and for other purposes.
Barnsley Corporation Act 1914 (repealed)	4 & 5 Geo. 5. c. xli	8 July 1914
An Act to extend the time limited for the construction of the Knoll Brook Waterworks by the mayor aldermen and burgesses of the County Borough of Barnsley to extend their powers with respect to their water and electricity undertakings to make further provision for the health local government and improvement of the borough and for other purposes. (Repealed by Statute Law (Repeals) Act 1989 (c. 43))
Severn Navigation Act 1914	4 & 5 Geo. 5. c. xlii	8 July 1914
An Act to amend the Acts relating to the Severn Navigation and to confer further powers on the Severn Commissioners and for other purposes.
Mexborough Urban District Council Act 1914 (repealed)	4 & 5 Geo. 5. c. xliii	8 July 1914
An Act to authorise the Mexborough Urban District Council to acquire the undertaking of the Mexbrough and District Water Company Limited and to make further provision in regard to the water supply of the district and for other purposes. (Repealed by Statute Law (Repeals) Act 1989 (c. 43))
Local Government Board's Provisional Orders Confirmation (No. 1) Act 1914	4 & 5 Geo. 5. c. xliv	8 July 1914
An Act to confirm certain Provisional Orders of the Local Government Board relating to Bromley and East and West Molesey.
	Bromley Order 1914 Provisional Order to enable the Urban District Council for the Borough of Bromley to put in force the Compulsory Clauses of the Lands Clauses Acts.	
	East and West Molesey Order 1914 Provisional Order to enable the Urban District Council of East and West Molesey to put in force the Compulsory Clauses of the Lands Clauses Acts.	
Local Government Board's Provisional Orders Confirmation (No. 2) Act 1914	4 & 5 Geo. 5. c. xlv	8 July 1914
An Act to confirm certain Provisional Orders of the Local Government Board relating to Cardiff Haverfordwest Maryport and Southampton and the North Bierley Joint Hospital District.
	Cardiff Order 1914 Provisional Order for partially repealing and altering the Cardiff Corporation Act 1884 (Note: Cardiff Corporation Act 1884 (47 & 48 Vict. c. ccxxii)) and the Cardiff Corporation Act 1898. (Note: Cardiff Corporation Act 1898 (61 & 62 Vict. c. cxxviii))	
	Haverfordwest Order 1914 Provisional Order for altering a Local Act (Note: Haverfordwest, Prendergast and Cartlett Improvement Act 1835 (5 & 6 Will. 4. c. lxxiii)) and Confirming Act. (Note: Local Government Board's Provisional Orders Confirmation (Bournemouth, &c.) Act 1878 (41 & 42 Vict. c. сlхi))	
	Maryport Order 1914 Provisional Order for partially repealing and altering certain Local Acts and a Confirming Act. (Note: Local Government Board's Provisional Orders Confirmation (No. 7) Act 1886 (50 Vict. c. xv))	
	Southampton Order 1914 Provisional Order for altering the Southampton Corporation Act 1885 (Note: Southampton Corporation Act 1885 (48 & 49 Vict. c. clxx)) and the Local Government Board's Provisional Orders Confirmation (No. 11) Act 1891. (Note: Local Government Board's Provisional Orders Confirmation (No. 11) Act 1891 (54 & 55 Vict. c. cvii))	
	North Bierley Joint Hospital Order 1914 Provisional Order for altering the Local Government Board's Provisional Orders Confirmation (No. 9) Act 1888. (Note: Local Government Board's Provisional Orders Confirmation (No. 9) Act 1888 (51 & 52 Vict. c. cii))	
Local Government Board's Provisional Orders Confirmation (No. 4) Act 1914	4 & 5 Geo. 5. c. xlvi	8 July 1914
An Act to confirm certain Provisional Orders of the Local Government Board relating to the Counties of Essex Oxford and Wilts.
	County of Essex Order 1914 Provisional Order made in pursuance of subsection (2) of Section 69 of the Local Government Act 1888. (Note: Local Government Act 1888 (51 & 52 Vict. c. 41))	
	County of Oxford Order 1914 Provisional Order for altering the County of Oxford Order 1903.	
	County of Wiltshire Order 1914 Provisional Order made in pursuance of subsection (2) of Section 69 of the Local Government Act 1888.	
Local Government Board's Provisional Orders Confirmation (No. 5) Act 1914	4 & 5 Geo. 5. c. xlvii	8 July 1914
An Act to confirm certain Provisional Orders of the Local Government Board relating to Bridgend Burnley (Rural) Holmfirth Maidstone Runcorn (Rural) and Tynemouth.
	Bridgend Order 1914 Provisional Order to enable the Urban District Council of Bridgend to put in force the Compulsory Clauses of the Lands Clauses Acts.	
	Burnley Rural Order 1914 Provisional Order to enable the Rural District Council of Burnley to put in force the Compulsory Clauses of the Lands Clauses Acts	
	Holmfirth Order 1914 Provisional Order to enable the Urban District Council of Holmfirth to put in force the Compulsory Clauses of the Lands Clauses Acts.	
	Maidstone Order 1914 Provisional Order to enable the Urban District Council for the Borough of Maidstone to put in force the Compulsory Clauses of the Lands Clauses Acts.	
	Runcorn Rural Order 1914 Provisionai Order to enable the Rural District Council of Runcorn to put in force the Compulsory Clauses of the Lands Clauses Acts.	
	Tynemouth Order 1914 Provisional Order to enable the Urban Sanitary Authority for the Borough of Tynemouth to put in force the Compulsory Clauses of the Lands Clauses Acts.	
Local Government Board's Provisional Orders Confirmation (No. 6) Act 1914	4 & 5 Geo. 5. c. xlviii	8 July 1914
An Act to confirm certain Provisional Orders of the Local Government Board relating to Bootle Gravesend Huddersfield Leek Llanelly and Workington and the North East Durham Joint Small-pox Hospital District.
	Bootle Order 1914 Provisional Order for altering the Bootle Corporation Act 1890. (Note: Bootle Corporation Act 1890 (53 & 54 Vict. c. ccxix))	
	Gravesend Order 1914 Provisional Order for partially repealing and altering the Gravesend Improvement Act 1856. (Note: Gravesend Improvement Act 1856 (19 & 20 Vict. c. xxvi))	
	Huddersfield Order 1914 Provisional Order for partially repealing and altering the Huddersfield Improvement Act 1871. (Note: Huddersfield Improvement Act 1871 (34 & 35 Vict. c. cli))	
	Leek Order 1914 Provisional Order for partially repealing and altering the Leek Improvement Act 1855. (Note: Leek Improvement Act 1855 (18 & 19 Vict. c. cxxxii))	
	Llanelly Order 1914 Provisional Order for altering the Llanelly Local Board Act 1888. (Note: Llanelly Local Board Act 1888 (51 & 52 Vict. c. clxxv))	
	Workington Order 1914 Provisional Order for altering the Local Act 3 Vict. c. xlv. (Note: Workington Improvement Act 1840 (3 & 4 Vict. c. xlv))	
	North East Durham Joint Smallpox Hospital Order 1914 Provisional Order for altering certain Confirming Acts.	
Local Government Board's Provisional Order Confirmation (No. 7) Act 1914	4 & 5 Geo. 5. c. xlix	8 July 1914
An Act to confirm a Provisional Order of the Local Government Board relating to Aberystwyth.
	Aberystwyth (Extension) Order 1914 Provisional Order made in pursuance of the Local Government Act 1888 for extending a Borough.	
Clydebank and District Water Order Confirmation Act 1914	4 & 5 Geo. 5. c. l	8 July 1914
An Act to confirm a Provisional Order under the Private Legislation Procedure (Scotland) Act 1899 relating to Clydebank and District Water.
	Clydebank and District Water Order 1914 Provisional Order to extend the time for the completion of works authorised by the Clydebank and District Water Order 1910 to authorise the Clydebank and District Water Trustees to borrow additional money and for other purposes.	
Inverness Water and Gas Order Confirmation Act 1914	4 & 5 Geo. 5. c. li	8 July 1914
An Act to confirm a Provisional Order under the Burgh Police (Scotland) Act 1892 (Note: Burgh Police (Scotland) Act 1892 (55 & 56 Vict. c. 55)) relating to Inverness Water and Gas.
	Inverness Water and Gas Order 1914 Inverness Water and Gas. Provisional Order.	
Land Drainage (Rippingale) Provisional Order Confirmation Act 1914	4 & 5 Geo. 5. c. lii	8 July 1914
An Act to confirm a Provisional Order under the Land Drainage Act 1861 (Note: Land Drainage Act 1861 (24 & 25 Vict. c. 133)) in the matter of a proposed drainage district in the Parish of Rippingale in the County of Lincoln.
	Land Drainage (Rippingale) Provisional Order 1914 In the matter of a proposed Drainage District in the Parish of Rippingale in the County of Lincoln.	
Commons Regulation (Gosford Green) Provisional Order Confirmation Act 1914 (repealed)	4 & 5 Geo. 5. c. liii	8 July 1914
An Act to confirm a Provisional Order under the Inclosure Acts 1845 to 1899 relating to Gosford Green in the City of Coventry and the Parish of St. Michael Without Coventry and for purposes incidental thereto. (Repealed by West Midlands County Council Act 1980 (c. xi))
	Provisional Order for the Regulation of Gosford Green.	
Coombe Street (Exeter) Independent Chapel Scheme Confirmation Act 1914	4 & 5 Geo. 5. c. liv	8 July 1914
An Act to confirm a Scheme of the Charity Commissioners for the Application or Management of the Charity consisting of the Independent Chapel in Coombe Street in the Parish of St. Mary Major in the City of Exeter.
	Scheme for the Application or Management of the Charity consisting of the Independent Chapel in Coombe Street in the Parish of St. Mary Major in the City of Exeter.	
Foleshill Road (Coventry) Congregational Chapel Scheme Confirmation Act 1914	4 & 5 Geo. 5. c. lv	8 July 1914
An Act to confirm a Scheme of the Charity Commissioners for the Application or Management of the Charity consisting of the Congregational Chapel and Trust Property in Foleshill Road in the City of Coventry.
	Scheme for the Application or Management of the Charity consisting of the Congregational Chapel and Trust Property in Foleshill Road in the City of Coventry.	
Horsforth (West Riding) Baptist Chapel Charities Scheme Confirmation Act 1914	4 & 5 Geo. 5. c. lvi	8 July 1914
An Act to confirm a Scheme of the Charity Commissioners for the Application or Management of the Charities consisting of the Baptist Chapel Burial Ground Sunday Schools and Trust Property at Horsforth in the West Riding of the County of York.
	Scheme for the Application or Management of the Charities consisting of the Baptist Chapel Burial Ground Sunday Schools and Trust Property at Horsforth in the West Riding of the County of York.	
Marden (Kent) Congregational Chapel Charity Scheme Confirmation Act 1914	4 & 5 Geo. 5. c. lvii	8 July 1914
An Act to confirm a Scheme of the Charity Commissioners for the Application or Management of the Charity consisting of the Congregational Chapel Manse and Trust Property in the Parish of Marden in the County of Kent.
	Scheme for the Application or Management of the Charity consisting of the Congregational Chapel Manse and Trust Property in the Parish of Marden in the County of Kent.	
Old Sleaford (Lincolnshire) Chapel Charity Scheme Confirmation Act 1914	4 & 5 Geo. 5. c. lviii	8 July 1914
An Act to confirm a Scheme of the Charity Commissioners for the Application or Management of the Charity consisting of the Protestant Dissenting Chapel otherwise Providence Baptist Chapel in the Parish of Old Sleaford in the County of Lincoln.
	Scheme for the Application or Management of the Charity consisting of the Protestant Dissenting Chapel otherwise Providence Baptist Chapel in the Parish of Old Sleaford in the County of Lincoln.	
Provisional Order (Marriages) Confirmation Act 1914 (repealed)	4 & 5 Geo. 5. c. lix	8 July 1914
An Act to confirm a Provisional Order made by one of His Majesty's Principal Secretaries of State under the Provisional Order (Marriages) Act 1905. (Note: Provisional Order (Marriages) Act 1905 (5 Edw. 7. c. 23)) (Repealed by Statute Law (Repeals) Act 1977 (c. 18))
	St. Mary Braisworth Boraston and Nash Burford Whitton Burford Order.	
Electric Lighting Orders Confirmation (No. 1) Act 1914	4 & 5 Geo. 5. c. lx	8 July 1914
An Act to confirm certain Provisional Orders made by the Board of Trade under the Electric Lighting Acts 1882 to 1909 relating to Hawarden Rural District Kenilworth Ledbury Llanfairfechan Merthyr Tydfil (Amendment) Newton-in-Makerfield Oulton Broad Ruthin Slaithwaite Thornton and Yeovil.
	Hawarden Rural District Council Electric Lighting Order 1914 Provisional Order granted by the Board of Trade under the Electric Lighting Acts 1882 to 1909 to the Rural District Council of Hawarden in respect of the Parish of West Saltney and part of the Parish of Hawarden both in the Rural District of Hawarden in the County of Flint.	
	Kenilworth Electric Lighting Order 1914 Provisional Order granted by the Board of Trade under the Electric Lighting Acts 1882 to 1909 to the Midlanр Electric Light and Power Company Limited in respect of the Urban District of Kenilworth in the County of Warwick.	
	Ledbury Electric Lighting Order 1914 Provisional Order granted by the Board of Trade under the Electric Lighting Acts 1882 to 1909 to the Ledbury Electric Supply Company Limited in respect of the Urban District of Ledbury and part of the Rural District of Ledbury in the County of Hereford.	
	Llanfairfechan Electric Lighting Order 1914 Provisional Order granted by the Board of Trade under the Electric Lighting Acts 1882 to 1909 to the Urban District Council of Llanfairfechan in respect of the Urban District of Llanfairfechan in the County of Carnarvon.	
	Merthyr Tydfil Electric Lighting (Amendment) Order 1914 Provisional Order granted by the Board of Trade under the Electric Lighting Acts 1882 to 1909 to the Merthyr Electric Traction and Lighting Company Limited for the Amendment of the Merthyr Tydfil Electric Lighting Order 1899.	
	Newton-in-Makerfield Electric Lighting Order 1914 rovisional Order granted by the Board of Trade under the Electric Lighting Acts 1882 to 1909 to the Newton-inMakerfield Urban District Council in respect of the Urban District of Newton-in-Makerfield in the County of Lancaster.	
	Oulton Broad Electric Lighting Order 1914 Provisional Order granted by the Board of Trade under the Electric Lighting Acts 1882 to 1909 to the Oulton Broad Electricity Company Limited in respect of the Urban District of Oulton Broad and the Parishes of Oulton and Carlton Colville in the Rural District of Mutford and Lothingland in the County of Suffolk.	
	Ruthin Electric Lighting Order 1914 Provisional Order granted by the Board of Trade under the Electric Lighting Acts 1882 to 1909 to James Herbert Edwards in respect of the Borough of Ruthin in the County of Denbigh.	
	Slaithwaite Urban District Electric Lighting Order 1914 Provisional Order granted by the Board of Trade under the Electric Lighting Acts 1882 to 1909 to the Slaithwaite Urban District Council in respect of the Urban District of Slaithwaite in the West Riding of the County of York.	
	Thornton Electric Lighting Order 1914 Provisional Order granted by the Board of Trade under the Electric Lighting Acts 1882 to 1909 to the Urban District Council of Thornton in respect of the Urban District of Thornton in the County Palatine of Lancaster.	
	Yeovil Electric Lighting Order 1914 Provisional Order granted by the Board of Trade under the Electric Lighting Acts 1882 to 1909 to Messrs. Petters Limited in respect of the Borough of Yeovil in the County of Somerset.	
Electric Lighting Orders Confirmation (No. 3) Act 1914 (repealed)	4 & 5 Geo. 5. c. lxi	8 July 1914
An Act to confirm certain Provisional Orders made by the Board of Trade under the Electric Lighting Acts 1882 to 1909 relating to Aboyne and District Ballater and Ellon. (Repealed by North of Scotland Electricity Order Confirmation Act 1958 (7 & 8 Eliz. 2. c. ii))
	Aboyne and District Electric Lighting Order 1914 Provisional Order granted by the Board of Trade under the Electric Lighting Acts 1882 to 1909 to James Duncan in respect of the Aboyne Special Lighting District and certain parts of the parishes of Birse and Aboyne and Glentanner in the County of Aberdeen.	
	Ballater Electric Lighting Order 1914 Provisional Order granted by the Board of Trade under the Electric Lighting Acts 1882 to 1909 to James Duncan in respect of the Burgh of Ballater in the County of Aberdeen.	
	Ellon Electric Lighting Order 1914 Provisional Order granted by the Board of Trade under the Electric Lighting Acts 1882 to 1909 to James Duncan in respect of the Burgh of Ellon in the County of Aberdeen.	
Electric Lighting Order Confirmation (No. 8 Kingstown) Act 1914	4 & 5 Geo. 5. c. lxii	8 July 1914
An Act to confirm a Provisional Order made by the Board of Trade under the Electric Lighting Acts 1882 to 1909 relating to Kingstown.
	Kingstown Electric Lighting Order 1914 Provisional Order granted by the Board of Trade under the Electric Lighting Acts 1882 to 1909 to the Dublin Southern District Electric Supply Company Limited in respect of the urban district of Kingstown in the county of Dublin.	
Dee Fisheries Provisional Order Confirmation Act 1914	4 & 5 Geo. 5. c. lxiii	8 July 1914
An Act to confirm a Provisional Order under the Salmon and Freshwater Fisheries Act 1907 (Note: Salmon and Freshwater Fisheries Act 1907 (7 Edw. 7. c. 15)) relating to the River Dee and other waters.
	Dee Fisheries Provisional Order 1914 Dee Fisheries Provisional Order.	
Inclosure (Elmstone Hardwicke) Provisional Order Confirmation Act 1914	4 & 5 Geo. 5. c. lxiv	8 July 1914
An Act to confirm a Provisional Order under the Inclosure Acts 1845 to 1899 relating to the Common Fields in the Parish of Elmstone Hardwicke in the County of Gloucester.
	Inclosure (Elmstone Hardwicke) Provisional Order 1914 Provisional Order for the Inclosure of the Common Fields at Elmstone Hardwicke in the County of Gloucester.	
Tramways Order Confirmation Act 1914 (repealed)	4 & 5 Geo. 5. c. lxv	8 July 1914
An Act to confirm a Provisional Order made by the Board of Trade under the Tramways Act 1870 (Note: Tramways Act 1870 (33 & 34 Vict. c. 78)) relating to Rotherham Corporation Tramways. (Repealed by Statute Law (Repeals) Act 1989 (c. 43))
	Rotherham Corporation Tramways Order 1914 Order authorising the Mayor Aldermen and Burgesses of the Borough of Rotherham to construct additional Tramways in the said Borough and for other purposes.	
Local Government Board (Ireland) Provisional Orders Confirmation (No. 1) Act 1914	4 & 5 Geo. 5. c. lxvi	8 July 1914
An Act to confirm certain Provisional Orders of the Local Government Board for Ireland relating to Kilkenny Dungarvan Holywood the Rural District of Naas No. 1 and the Portarlington Joint Burial Board.
	Kilkenny Order 1914 Provisional Order to enable the Urban Sanitary Authority for the Borough of Kilkenny to put in force the Compulsory Clauses of the Lands Clauses Acts.	
	Dungarvan Order 1914 Provisional Order to enable the Council of the Urban District of Dungarvan to put in force the Compulsory Clauses of the Lands Clauses Acts.	
	Holywood Order 1914 Provisional Order to enable the Council of the Urban District of Holywood to put in force the Compulsory Clauses of the Lands Clauses Acts.	
	Timahoe Burial Ground Order 1914 Provisional Order to enable the Council of the Rural District of Naas No. 1 to put in force the Compulsory Clauses of the Lands Clauses Acts.	
	Portarlington Joint Burial Board Order 1914 Provisional Order to enable the Portarlington Joint Burial Board to put in force the Compulsory Clauses of the Lands Clauses Acts.	
Western Valleys (Monmouthshire) Railless Electric Traction (Extension) Order Confirmation Act 1914	4 & 5 Geo. 5. c. lxvii	8 July 1914
An Act to confirm a Provisional Order made by the Board of Trade under the Western Valleys (Monmouthshire) Railless Electric Traction Act 1913 (Note: Western Valleys (Monmouthshire) Railless Electric Traction Act 1913 (3 & 4 Geo. 5. c. cxv)) relating to Western Valleys (Monmouthshire) Railless Electric Traction.
	Western Valleys (Monmouthshire) Railless Electric Traction (Extension) Order 1914 Order empowering the Western Valleys (Monmouthshire) Railless Electric Traction Company to extend their authorised routes for trolley vehicles in the urban district of Abertillery in the county of Monmouth.	
Lanarkshire Gas Order Confirmation Act 1914 (repealed)	4 & 5 Geo. 5. c. lxviii	8 July 1914
An Act to confirm a Provisional Order under the Private Legislation Procedure (Scotland) Act 1899 relating to Lanarkshire Gas. (Repealed by Statute Law (Repeals) Act 1998 (c. 43))
	Lanarkshire Gas Order 1914 Provisional Order to amend the Burghs Gas Supply (Scotland) Act 1876 (Note: Burghs Gas Supply (Scotland) Act 1876 (39 & 40 Vict. c. 49)) in relation to the County of Lanark and for other purposes.	
Dundee Boundaries Extension and Gas Order Confirmation Act 1914 (repealed)	4 & 5 Geo. 5. c. lxix	8 July 1914
An Act to confirm a Provisional Order under the Private Legislation Procedure (Scotland) Act 1899 relating to Dundee Boundaries Extension and Gas. (Repealed by Dundee Corporation (Consolidated Powers) Order Confirmation Act 1957 (6 & 7 Eliz. 2. c. iv))
	Dundee Boundaries Extension and Gas Order 1914 Provisional Order to extend the boundaries of the city and Royal burgh of Dundee and the county of the city of Dundee and to confer further powers on the Dundee Gas Commissioners in relation to their gas undertaking and for other purposes.	
Glasgow Subway Railway Order Confirmation Act 1914	4 & 5 Geo. 5. c. lxx	8 July 1914
An Act to confirm a Provisional Order under the Private Legislation Procedure (Scotland) Act 1899 relating to Glasgow Subway Railway.
	Glasgow Subway Railway Order 1914 Provisional Order to authorise the Glasgow District Subway Company to change their name and to borrow or raise further money to extend the time for the holding and disposal of their surplus lands and properties and for other purposes.	
Colinton Tramways Extension Order Confirmation Act 1914	4 & 5 Geo. 5. c. lxxi	8 July 1914
An Act to confirm a Provisional Order under the Private Legislation Procedure (Scotland) Act 1899 relating to Colinton Tramways Extension.
	Colinton Tramways (Extension) Order 1914 Provisional Order to extend the time for the construction of the tramways and works authorised by the Colinton Tramways Order 1909 and for other purposes.	
Preston Corporation Act 1914	4 & 5 Geo. 5. c. lxxii	31 July 1914
An Act to confer further powers upon the Corporation of Preston with reference to the Ribble Navigation to authorise the Corporation to construct new streets and additional tramways to confer upon the Corporation further powers with reference to their water undertaking to make better provision for the health local Government and finance of the borough of Preston and for other purposes.
Brentford Gas Act 1914	4 & 5 Geo. 5. c. lxxiii	31 July 1914
An Act to consolidate and convert the capital of the Brentford Gas Company to authorise the acquisition by the Brentford Gas Company of the undertakings of the Staines and Egham District Gas and Coke Company Limited and the Sunbury Gas Consumers Company Limited to confer further powers on the Brentford Gas Company and for other purposes.
Chelmsford Gas Act 1914	4 & 5 Geo. 5. c. lxxiv	31 July 1914
An Act for incorporating and conferring powers on the Chelmsford Gas Company and for other purposes.
Bedwas and Machen Urban District Council Act 1914	4 & 5 Geo. 5. c. lxxv	31 July 1914
An Act to empower the Urban District Council of Bedwas and Machen to supply gas within the parish of Machen Upper in their district and parts of certain adjoining parishes and for other purposes.
Market Rasen Water Act 1914	4 & 5 Geo. 5. c. lxxvi	31 July 1914
An Act to authorise the Market Rasen Water Company to construct new works to raise additional capital and for other purposes.
Hull and Barnsley Railway Act 1914	4 & 5 Geo. 5. c. lxxvii	31 July 1914
An Act to confer further powers upon the Hull and Barnsley Railway Company in respect of their own undertaking and upon that Company and the Great Central Railway Company and the North Eastern Railway Company respectively in respect of joint undertakings to extend the time for the compulsory purchase of lands and for the completion of works authorised to be acquired and constructed by the Hull and Barnsley Railway Act 1909 (Note: Hull and Barnsley Railway Act 1909 (9 Edw. 7. c. lxxii)) to revive the powers for the construction of works authorised by the Hull Joint Dock Act 1899 (Note: Hull Joint Dock Act 1899 (62 & 63 Vict. c. ccxlii)) and for other purposes.
North Metropolitan Electric Power Supply Act 1914	4 & 5 Geo. 5. c. lxxviii	31 July 1914
An Act to confer further powers upon the North Metropolitan Electric Power Supply Company and the North Metropolitan Electrical Power Distribution Company Limited and for other purposes.
Norwich Electric Tramways Act 1914	4 & 5 Geo. 5. c. lxxix	31 July 1914
An Act to authorise the Norwich Electric Tramways Company to construct additional tramways and other works and for other purposes.
Motherwell Water and Sewage Purification Act 1914	4 & 5 Geo. 5. c. lxxx	31 July 1914
An Act to extend the compulsory limits of water supply of the burgh of Motherwell to confer further powers as to water supply to construct and maintain sewers and sewage purification works to acquire lands to borrow money and for other purposes.
Hightown Gas and Electricity Act 1914	4 & 5 Geo. 5. c. lxxxi	31 July 1914
An Act for incorporating and conferring powers on the Hightown Gas and Electricity Company.
Longwood and Slaithwaite Gas Act 1914 (repealed)	4 & 5 Geo. 5. c. lxxxii	31 July 1914
An Act to provide for the transfer of the undertaking of the Slaithwaite Gas Company to the Longwood Gas Company to confer further powers on the Longwood Gas Company and for other purposes. (Repealed by Huddersfield Corporation Gas Act 1919 (9 & 10 Geo. 5. c. lxi))
Deal and Walmer Gas and Electricity Act 1914	4 & 5 Geo. 5. c. lxxxiii	31 July 1914
An Act to empower the Deal and Walmer Gas Company to supply electricity to change the name of the Company and for other purposes.
Shropshire, Worcestershire and Staffordshire Electric Power Act 1914 (repealed)	4 & 5 Geo. 5. c. lxxxiv	31 July 1914
An Act to confer further powers upon the Shropshire Worcestershire and Staffordshire Electric Power Company and for other purposes. (Repealed by Shropshire, Worcestershire and Staffordshire Electric Power (Consolidation) Act 1938 (1 & 2 Geo. 6. c. lviii))
Yorkshire Electric Power Act 1914 (repealed)	4 & 5 Geo. 5. c. lxxxv	31 July 1914
An Act to confer further powers on the Yorkshire Electric Power Company. (Repealed by Statute Law (Repeals) Act 1989 (c. 43))
Birkenhead Corporation Act 1914	4 & 5 Geo. 5. c. lxxxvi	31 July 1914
An Act to empower the Corporation of Birkenhead to provide and work motor omnibuses to make further provision with respect to the ferries of the Corporation and for other purposes.
Upper Medway Navigation and Conservancy Act 1914 (repealed)	4 & 5 Geo. 5. c. lxxxvii	31 July 1914
An Act to confer on the Upper Medway Navigation and Conservancy Board further borrowing powers and for other purposes. (Repealed by Southern Water Authority Act 1982 (c. xxii))
Newport Corporation Act 1914	4 & 5 Geo. 5. c. lxxxviii	31 July 1914
An Act to empower the mayor aldermen and burgesses of the borough of Newport to construct a bridge over the River Usk and tramways and other works and for other purposes.
Beira Railway Company Act 1914	4 & 5 Geo. 5. c. lxxxix	31 July 1914
An Act to empower the Beira Railway Company Limited to make adjustments in its accounts and for other purposes.
Skegness Gas Act 1914	4 & 5 Geo. 5. c. xc	31 July 1914
An Act for incorporating and conferring powers on the Skegness Gas Company.
Stourbridge Navigation Act 1914	4 & 5 Geo. 5. c. xci	31 July 1914
An Act to amend the Canal Tolls and Charges No. 3 (Aberdare &c. Canals) Order 1894 in relation to the Stourbridge Navigation and Acts relating to that navigation to confer further powers on the Company of Proprietors of the said navigation and for other purposes.
Whitewell and District Gas Act 1914 (repealed)	4 & 5 Geo. 5. c. xcii	31 July 1914
An Act for incorporating and conferring powers on the Whitwell and District Gas Company. (Repealed by South Yorkshire and Derbyshire Gas Act 1930 (20 & 21 Geo. 5. c. clxiii))
Ellesmere Port and Whitby Urban District Council Act 1914	4 & 5 Geo. 5. c. xciii	31 July 1914
An Act to empower the Ellesmere Port and Whitby Urban District Council to purchase certain gasworks of the Shropshire Union Railways and Canal Company and to confer further powers upon the Council with regard to the supply of gas and electricity and for the improvement of the district.
Liverpool Gas Act 1914	4 & 5 Geo. 5. c. xciv	31 July 1914
An Act to extend the limits of supply of the Liverpool United Gaslight Company to provide for the conversion of the existing capital of the Company to change the name of the Company and for other purposes.
North Eastern Railway Act 1914	4 & 5 Geo. 5. c. xcv	31 July 1914
An Act to confer additional powers upon the North Eastern Railway Company for the construction of new railways and other works and the acquisition of lands to authorise the construction of railways by the South Yorkshire Joint Line Committee and for other purposes.
Bristol Corporation (Various Powers) Act 1914	4 & 5 Geo. 5. c. xcvi	31 July 1914
An Act to empower the Corporation of Bristol to construct works and to enlarge certain cemeteries in the City of Bristol to confer further powers upon the Corporation and for other purposes.
London United Tramways Act 1914	4 & 5 Geo. 5. c. xcvii	31 July 1914
An Act to empower the London United Tramways Limited to enter into working and other agreements with owners of tramways and railways and for other purposes.
Middlesex County Council (Great West Road and Finance) Act 1914	4 & 5 Geo. 5. c. xcviii	31 July 1914
An Act to authorise the construction of new roads and a road widening in the urban districts of Brentford Heston and Isleworth and Chiswick in the county of Middlesex and for other purposes.
Port Talbot Railway and Docks Act 1914	4 & 5 Geo. 5. c. xcix	31 July 1914
An Act to authorise the Port Talbot Railway and Docks Company to extend the piers at Port Talbot to construct a new entrance lock and for other purposes.
South Suburban Gas Act 1914	4 & 5 Geo. 5. c. c	31 July 1914
An Act to empower the South Suburban Gas Company to acquire lands and construct works at Erith and for other purposes.
Reading Corporation Act 1914	4 & 5 Geo. 5. c. ci	31 July 1914
An Act to empower the mayor aldermen and burgesses of the borough of Reading to construct additional tramways and to provide and run trolley vehicles and omnibuses and to make further provision for the health local government and improvement of the borough and for other purposes.
London, Brighton and South Coast Railway Act 1914	4 & 5 Geo. 5. c. cii	31 July 1914
An Act to confer further powers on the London Brighton and South Coast Railway Company to make provision with respect to the supply of electricity to the Company and for other purposes.
Leyland Gas Act 1914	4 & 5 Geo. 5. c. ciii	31 July 1914
An Act to extend the limits of the Leyland Gas Company for the supply of gas to empower the Company to raise further capital and for other purposes.
Tees Valley Water Act 1914	4 & 5 Geo. 5. c. civ	31 July 1914
An Act to authorise the Tees Valley Water Board to construct additional waterworks to extend the limits of supply of the Board to make better provision with regard to their water undertaking and for other purposes.
Middlesbrough Corporation Act 1914 (repealed)	4 & 5 Geo. 5. c. cv	31 July 1914
An Act to extinguish the tolls levied in respect of the user of certain roads in and adjoining the county borough of Middlesbrough and to make provision for the maintenance of such roads to authorise the mayor aldermen and burgesses of the said county borough to acquire the undertaking of the North Ormesby Gas Company Limited to confer further powers upon them with respect to their gas and electricity undertakings to make further provision for the health local government and improvement of the borough and for other purposes. (Repealed by Middlesbrough Corporation Act 1933 (23 & 24 Geo. 5. c. lxxxiii))
Birmingham Corporation Act 1914	4 & 5 Geo. 5. c. cvi	31 July 1914
An Act to empower the Lord Mayor Aldermen and Citizens of the city of Birmingham to construct additional tramways and street improvements and to provide and work omnibuses to make further provision in regard to the health local government and improvement of the city and for other purposes.
Great Western Railway Act 1914	4 & 5 Geo. 5. c. cvii	31 July 1914
An Act for conferring further powers upon the Great Western Railway Company in respect of their own undertaking and upon that Company and the London and North Western Railway Company in respect of an undertaking in which they are jointly interested and for other purposes.
Swindon Corporation (Wilts and Berks Canal Abandonment) Act 1914	4 & 5 Geo. 5. c. cviii	31 July 1914
An Act to authorise the transfer to the mayor aldermen and burgesses of the borough of Swindon of the site of portion of the Wilts and Berks Canal and the Coate Reservoir and the abandonment of the remainder of such canal and the sale or disposal of the site thereof and for other purposes.
Local Government Board (Ireland) Provisional Orders Confirmation (No. 2) Act 1914	4 & 5 Geo. 5. c. cix	31 July 1914
An Act to confirm certain Provisional Orders of the Local Government Board for Ireland relating to the Urban Districts of Cashel and Castlebar the Rural Districts of Mountmellick and Sligo and the Bangor and Newtownards Joint Hospital District.
	Cashel Order 1914 Provisional Order to enable the Council of the Urban District of Cashel to put in force the Compulsory Clauses of the Lands Clauses Acts.	
	Castlebar Order 1914 Provisional Order to enable the Council of the Urban District of Castlebar to put in force the Compulsory Clauses of the Lands Clauses Acts.	
	Maryborough Sewerage Order 1914 Provisional Order to enable the Council of the Rural District of Mountmellick to put in force the Compulsory Clauses of the Lands Clauses Acts.	
	Rosses Point Waterworks Order 1914 Provisional Order to enable the Council of the Rural District of Sligo to put in force the Compulsory Clauses of the Lands Clauses Acts.	
	Bangor and Newtownards Joint Hospital Order 1914 Provisional Order for partially repealing Confirming Acts.	
Local Government Board (Ireland) Provisional Order Confirmation (No. 3) Act 1914	4 & 5 Geo. 5. c. cx	31 July 1914
An Act to confirm a Provisional Order of the Local Government Board for Ireland relating to the Counties of Antrim and Londonderry.
	Antrim and Londonderry Boundaries Order 1914 Provisional Order made in pursuance of Articles 25 and 27 of the Schedule to the Local Government (Application of Enactments) Order 1898. (Note: Local Government (Application of Enactments) Order 1898 (SR&O 1899/1120))	
Local Government Board (Ireland) Provisional Orders Confirmation (No. 4) Act 1914	4 & 5 Geo. 5. c. cxi	31 July 1914
An Act to confirm certain Provisional Orders of the Local Government Board for Ireland relating to Cavan and Londonderry.
	Cavan Order 1914 Provisionai Order to enable the Council of the Urban District of Cavan to put in force the Compulsory Clauses of the Lands Clauses Acts.	
	Londonderry Order 1914 Provisional Order to enable the Corporation of Londonderry to put in force the Compulsory Clauses of the Lands Clauses Acts.	
Gas and Water Orders Confirmation (No. 1) Act 1914	4 & 5 Geo. 5. c. cxii	31 July 1914
An Act to confirm certain Provisional Orders made by the Board of Trade under the Gas and Water Works Facilities Act 1870 (Note: Gas and Water Works Facilities Act 1870 (33 & 34 Vict. c. 70)) relating to Dursley Gas Hayfield Gas High Wycombe Gas Amersham Beaconsfield and District Water and Elham Valley Water.
	Dursley Gas Order 1914 Order empowering the Dursley Gas Light and Coke Company Limited to construct additional Gasworks to raise additional Capital and for other purposes.	
	Hayfield Gas Order 1914 Order empowering the Hayfield Gas Company Limited to acquire additional Lands to construct additional Gasworks to raise additional Capital and for other purposes.	
	High Wycombe Gas Order 1914 Order authorising the High Wycombe Gas Light and Coke Company Limited to construct additional Gasworks in the Borough of Chepping Wycombe otherwise High Wycombe in the County of Buckingham.	
	Amersham, Beaconsfield and District Water Order 1914 Order empowering the Amersham Beaconsfield and District Waterworks Company Limited to construct new Works to raise additional Capital and for other purposes.	
	Elham Valley Water Order 1914 Order empowering the Elham Valley Water Company Limited to extend their limits of supply to acquire additional Lands to construct and maintain additional Waterworks and to raise additional Capital.	
Gas and Water Orders Confirmation (No. 2) Act 1914	4 & 5 Geo. 5. c. cxiii	31 July 1914
An Act to confirm certain Provisional Orders made by the Board of Trade under the Gas and Water Works Facilities Act 1870 relating to Dronfield Gas North Middlesex Gas Uxbridge Gas Flint Gas and Water and Fisherton Anger and Bemerton Waterworks.
	Dronfield Gas Order 1914 Order authorising the Dronfield Gas Light and Coke Company to construct and maintain additional gasworks and for other purposes.	
	North Middlesex Gas Order 1914 Order empowering the North Middlesex Gas Company to construct further works for the manufacture and storage of gas and residual products and for other purposes.	
	Uxbridge Gas Order 1914 Order authorising the Uxbridge Gas Company to raise additional capital and for other purposes.	
	Flint Gas and Water Order 1914 Order empowering the Flint Gas and Water Company Limited to construct new waterworks and to raise additional capital and for other purposes.	
	Fisherton Anger and Bemerton Waterworks Order 1914 Order extending the Limits of Supply of the Fisherton Anger and Bemerton Waterworks Company.	
Pier and Harbour Order Confirmation (No. 1) Act 1914	4 & 5 Geo. 5. c. cxiv	31 July 1914
An Act to confirm a Provisional Order made by the Board of Trade under the General Pier and Harbour Act 1861 (Note: General Pier and Harbour Act 1861 (24 & 25 Vict. c. 45)) relating to Cowes.
	Cowes Harbour Order 1914 Order to authorise the Cowes Harbour Commissioners to construct a Breakwater on the Shrape Mud at East Cowes and for other purposes.	
Pier and Harbour Orders Confirmation (No. 3) Act 1914	4 & 5 Geo. 5. c. cxv	31 July 1914
An Act to confirm certain Provisional Orders made by the Board of Trade under the General Pier and Harbour Act 1861 relating to Amlwch Armadale and Fraserburgh.
	Amlwch Harbour Order 1914 Order for transferring the undertaking of the Trustees of the Harbour of Amluch from those Trustees to the Urban District Council for the Urban District of Amlwch in the County of Anglesey for the discharge of the said Trustees to confer powers on the said Council with reference to the holding maintaining management and improvement of the said Harbour to authorise the said Council to borrow money for the purposes of the said Harbour and otherwise and for other purposes.	
	Armadale Pier Order 1914 Order for the Incorporation of Pier Trustees and for the Construction of a Pier and Access Road at Armadale Bay in the Parish of Sleat Island of Skye and County of Inverness and for the Maintenance and Regulation of the same.	
	Fraserburgh Harbour Order 1914 Order for enabling the Provost Magistrates and Councillors of the Burgh of Fraserburgh in the County of Aberdeen to guarantee repayment of Money lent to the Fraserburgh Harbour Commissioners from the Development Fund and for other purposes.	
Pier and Harbour Orders Confirmation (No. 4) Act 1914	4 & 5 Geo. 5. c. cxvi	31 July 1914
An Act to confirm certain Provisional Orders made by the Board of Trade under the General Pier and Harbour Act 1861 relating to Nairn and Saltcoats.
	Nairn Harbour Order 1914 Order for empowering the Provost Magistrates and Councillors of the Royal Burgh of Nairn in the County of Nairn to construct new Works at Nairn Harbour to borrow money for the purposes thereof to levy a special harbour rate to charge loans on their funds or rates and for other purposes.	
	Saltcoats Harbour Order 1914 Order for the transfer to the provost magistrates and councillors of the burgh of Saltcoats in the county of Ayr of the undertaking known as Saltcoats Harbour and lands and heritages to confer powers on the Town Council with reference to holding maintenance management and improvement of the harbour to authorise the Town Council to borrow money for the purposes of the harbour and for other purposes.	
Electric Lighting Orders Confirmation (No. 2) Act 1914	4 & 5 Geo. 5. c. cxvii	31 July 1914
An Act to confirm certain Provisional Orders made by the Board of Trade under the Electric Lighting Acts 1882 to 1909 relating to Abercarn Chorley Farnham (Extension) Harwich Kingston-upon-Hull (Extension) Knottingley Leeds (Extension) and Warminster.
	Abercarn Electric Lighting Order 1914 Provisional Order granted by the Board of Trade under the Electric Lighting Acts 1882 to 1909 to the South Wales Electrical Power Distribution Company in respect of the Urban District of Abercarn in the County of Monmouth.	
	Chorley Electric Lighting Order 1914 Provisional Order granted by the Board of Trade under the Electric Lighting Acts 1882 to 1909 to the Lancashire Electric Power Company in respect of the Borough of Chorley in the County of Lancaster.	
	Farnham Electric Lighting (Extension) Order 1914 Provisional Order granted by the Board of Trade under the Electric Lighting Acts 1882 to 1909 to the Farnham Gas and Electricity Company in respect of so much of the Parish of Frensham in the Rural District of Farnham as is known as the Frensham Ward and for authorising them to raise additional capital.	
	Harwich Corporation Electric Lighting Order 1914 Provisional Order granted by the Board of Trade under the Electric Lighting Acts 1882 to 1909 to the Mayor Aldermen and Burgesses of the Borough of Harwich in respect of the Borough of Harwich in the County of Essex.	
	Kingston-upon-Hull Electric Lighting (Extension) Order 1914 Provisional Order granted by the Board of Trade under the Electric Lighting Acts 1882 to 1909 to the Mayor Aldermen and Citizens of the City and County of Kingston-upon-Hull in respect of the Parish of Sutton in the Rural District of Sculcoates in the East Riding of the County of York.	
	Knottingley Electric Lighting Order 1914 Provisional Order granted by the Board of Trade under the Electric Lighting Acts 1882 to 1909 to the Urban District Council of Knottingley in respect of the Urban District of Knottingley in the West Riding of the County of York.	
	Leeds Electric Lighting (Extension) Order 1914 Provisional Order granted by the Board of Trade under the Electric Lighting Acts 1882 to 1909 to the Lord Mayor Aldermen and Citizens of the City of Leeds in respect of Roundhay in the City of Leeds in the West Riding of the County of York.	
	Warminster Electric Lighting Order 1914 Provisional Order granted by the Board of Trade under the Electric Lighting Acts 1882 to 1909 to James Herbert Edwards in respect of a part of the Urban District of Warminster and a part of the Rural District of Warminster in the County of Wilts.	
Electric Lighting Orders Confirmation (No. 4) Act 1914	4 & 5 Geo. 5. c. cxviii	31 July 1914
An Act to confirm certain Provisional Orders made by the Board of Trade under the Electric Lighting Acts 1882 to 1909 relating to Banstead Walton-on-the-Hill and Kingswood Beeston and District Bradford-on-Avon Feltham and District Gelligaer (Bedlinog and Fochriw) Heanor Eastwood and District Midhurst and District and Rickmansworth and Chorleywood.
	Banstead, Walton-on-the-Hill and Kingswood Electric Lighting Order 1914 Provisional Order granted by the Board of Trade under the Electric Lighting Acts 1882 to 1909 to Gilbert Allom in respect of the Parish of Banstead in the Rural District of Epsom and the Parishes of Walton-on-the-Hill and Kingswood in the Rural District of Reigate all in the County of Surrey.	
	Beeston and District Electric Lighting Order 1914 Provisional Order granted by the Board of Trade under the Electric Lighting Acts 1882 to 1909 to the Derbyshire and Nottinghamshire Electric Power Company in respect of the Urban District of Beeston and the Parishes of Chilwell Bramcote and Stapleford in the Rural District of Stapleford all in the County of Nottingham and the Parish of Sandiacre in the Rural District of Shardlow in the County of Derby.	
	Bradford-on-Avon Electric Lighting Order 1914 Provisional Order granted by the Board of Trade under the Electric Lighting Acts 1882 to 1909 to James Herbert Edwards in respect of the Urban District of Bradfordon-Avon and the Parishes of Limpley Stoke Westwooр Winsley Bradford Without and Holt in the Rural District of Bradford-on-Avon in the County of Wilts.	
	Feltham and District Electric Lighting Order 1914 Provisional Order granted by the Board of Trade under the Electric Lighting Acts 1882 to 1909 to Frederick Harold Edwards in respect of the Urban Districts of Feltham and Sunbury-on-Thames and the Parishes of Ashford East Bedfont Hanworth Laleham Littleton and Shepperton in the Rural District of Staines all in the County of Middleseх.	
	Gelligaer (Bedlinog and Fochriw) Electric Lighting Order 1914 Provisional Order granted by the Board of Trade under the Electric Lighting Acts 1882 to 1909 to the Urban District Council of Gelligaer in respect of the portions of the Urban District of Gelligaer in the County of Glamorgan known as Bedlinog and Fochriw.	
	Heanor, Eastwood and District Electric Lighting Order 1914 Provisional Order granted by the Board of Trade under the Electric Lighting Acts 1882 to 1909 to the Derbyshire and Nottinghamshire Electric Power Company in respect of the Urban Districts of Alfreton Ripley and Heanor in the County of Derby and the Urban District of Eastwood and the Parishes of Greasley Kimberley Awsworth and Nuthall in the Rural District of Basford in the County of Nottingham.	
	Midhurst and District Electric Lighting Order 1914 Provisional Order granted by the Board of Trade under the Electric Lighting Acts 1882 to 1909 to Bernard Edward Granville Bailey the Honourable Weetman Harold Miller Pearson M.P. (Note: Harold Pearson, 2nd Viscount Cowdray.) and Thomas Stallibrass in respect of the Parishes of Cocking Easebourne Midhurst and West Lavington in the Rural District of Midhurst in the County of Sussex.	
	Rickmansworth and Chorleywood Electric Lighting Order 1914 Provisional Order granted by the Board of Trade under the Electric Lighting Acts 1882 to 1909 to the Colne Valley Electric Supply Company Limited in respect of the Urban District of Rickmansworth the Urban District of Chorleywood and parts of the Parish of Rickmansworth Rural in the Rural District of Watford all in the County of Hertford.	
Electric Lighting Orders Confirmation (No. 6) Act 1914	4 & 5 Geo. 5. c. cxix	31 July 1914
An Act to confirm certain Provisional Orders made by the Board of Trade under the Electric Lighting Acts 1882 to 1909 relating to Ayr Burgh (Extension) Edinburgh Corporation (Extension) and Galashiels and District.
	Ayr Burgh Electric Lighting (Extension) Order 1914 Provisional Order granted by the Board of Trade under the Electric Lighting Acts 1882 to 1909 to the provost magistrates and councillors of the burgh of Ayr in respect of the burgh of Prestwick portions of the parish of Dundonald and of the united parish of Monkton and Prestwick and portions of the parishes of Ayr Dalrymple and Maybole all in the county of Ayr.	
	Edinburgh Corporation Electric Lighting (Extension) Order 1914 Provisional Order granted by the Board of Trade under the Electric Lighting Acts 1882 to 1909 to the lord provost magistrates and council of the city and Royal burgh of Edinburgh in respect of the parishes of Cramond Corstorphine Colinton Liberton and Newton in the county of Midlothian.	
	Galashiels and District Electric Lighting Order 1914 Provisional Order granted by the Board of Trade under the Electric Lighting Acts 1882 to 1909 to the Galashiels and District Electric Supply Company Limited in respect of the burghs of Galashiels and Selkirk and portions of the parishes of Galashiels and Selkirk in the county of Selkirk and portion of the parish of Melrose in the county of Roxburgh.	
Electric Lighting Orders Confirmation (No. 7) Act 1914	4 & 5 Geo. 5. c. cxx	31 July 1914
An Act to confirm certain Provisional Orders made by the Board of Trade under the Electric Lighting Acts 1882 to 1909 relating to Cowbridge and Penybont Hinckley and District Reading (York Town Bulk Supply) Watford (Extension) Whitstable and York (Extension).
	Cowbridge and Penybont Electric Lighting Order 1914 Provisional Order granted by the Board of Trade under the Electric Lighting Acts 1882 to 1909 to the South Wales Electrical Power Distribution Company in respect of the borough of Cowbridge and parts of the rural districts of Cowbridge Llantrisant and Llantwit Fardre and Penybont all in the county of Glamorgan.	
	Hinckley and District Electric Lighting Order 1914 Provisional Order granted by the Board of Trade under the Hinckley and Electric Lighting Acts 1882 to 1909 to the Midland Electric Light and Power Company Limited in respect of the urban district of Hinckley and the parishes of Barwell and Earl Shilton in the rural district of Hinckley all in the county of Leicester.	
	Reading Electric (York Town Bulk Supply) Electric Lighting Order 1914 Provisional Order granted by the Board of Trade under the Electric Lighting Acts 1882 to 1909 authorising the Reading Electric Supply Company Limited to supply electrical energy in bulk to the York Town and Blackwater Gas Company.	
	Watford Electric Lighting (Extension) Order 1914 Provisional Order granted by the Board of Trade under the Electric Lighting Acts 1882 to 1909 to the urban district council of Watford in respect of the urban district of Bushey and the parish of Aldenham in the rural district of Watford both in the county of Hertford.	
	Whitstable Electric Lighting Order 1914 Provisional Order granted by the Board of Trade under the Electric Lighting Acts 1882 to 1909 to the Whitstable Electric Company Limited in respect of the urban district of Whitstable in the county of Kent.	
	York Electric Lighting (Extension) Order 1914 Provisional Order granted by the Board of Trade under the Electric Lighting Acts 1882 to 1909 to the Lord Mayor Aldermen and Citizens of the city of York in respect of certain parishes or townships in the rural district of Escrick in the East Riding of the county of York in the rural districts of Easingwold and Flaxton in the North Riding of the county of York and in the rural districts of Bishopthorpe Great Ouseburn and Tadcaster in the West Riding of the county of York.	
Electric Lighting Order Confirmation (No. 9) Act 1914 (repealed)	4 & 5 Geo. 5. c. cxxi	31 July 1914
An Act to confirm a Provisional Order made by the Board of Trade under the Electric Lighting Acts 1882 to 1909 relating to certain burghs and parishes in the county of Ayr. (Repealed by South of Scotland Electricity Order Confirmation Act 1956 (4 & 5 Eliz. 2. c. xciv))
	Kilmarnock Electric Lighting (Extension) Order 1914 Provisional Order granted by the Board of Trade under the Electric Lighting Acts 1882 to 1909 to the Provost Magistrates and Councillors of the Burgh of Kilmarnock in respect of the Burghs of Irvine Troon Galston Newmilns and Greenholm and Darvel and portions of the Parishes of Kilmarnock Riccarton Dundonald the United Parishes of Monkton and Prestwick and the Parishes of Symington Craigie Galston Sorn Loudoun Fenwick Kilmaurs Dreghorn and Irvine all in the County of Ayr.	
Sea Fisheries (Emsworth) Provisional Order Confirmation Act 1914	4 & 5 Geo. 5. c. cxxii	31 July 1914
An Act to confirm a Provisional Order under the Sea Fisheries Act 1868 (Note: Sea Fisheries Act 1868 (31 & 32 Vict. c. 45)) relating to Oyster and Mussel Fisheries in Emsworth Channel.
	Emsworth Channel Fishery Order 1914 Order for the Amendment of the Emsworth Channel Fishery Order 1871.	
Sea Fisheries (Yealm) Provisional Order Confirmation Act 1914	4 & 5 Geo. 5. c. cxxiii	31 July 1914
An Act to confirm a Provisional Order under the Sea Fisheries Act 1868 relating to Oyster and Mussels Fisheries in the estuary of the River Yealm in the county of Devon.
	Yealm Fishery Order 1914 Order for conferring on Samuel Farmer Kingcome of Yealmpton Devonshire a right of Several Oyster and Mussel Fishery in the River Yealm or the estuary thereof in the county of Devon.	
Land Drainage (Tillingham Valley) Provisional Order Confirmation Act 1914 (repealed)	4 & 5 Geo. 5. c. cxxiv	31 July 1914
An Act to confirm a Provisional Order under the Land Drainage Act 1861 in the matter of a proposed Drainage District in the parishes of Brede Undimore Beckley Peasmarsh Rye and Rye Foreign in the County of Sussex. (Repealed by Statute Law (Repeals) Act 1993 (c. 50))
	Land Drainage (Tillingham Valley) Provisional Order 1914 In the matter of a proposed Drainage District in the parishes of Brede Udimore Beckley Peasmarsh Rye and Rye Foreign in the County of Sussex.	
Education Board Provisional Orders Confirmation (Cambridge, &c.) Act 1914	4 & 5 Geo. 5. c. cxxv	31 July 1914
An Act to confirm certain Provisional Orders made by the Board of Education under the Education Acts 1870 to 1911 to enable the Councils of the Administrative Counties of Cambridge Cumberland and Surrey and the County Borough of Swansea to put in force the Lands Clauses Acts.
	Cambridge Administrative County Council Order 1914 Provisional Order for putting in force the Lands Clauses Acts.	
	Cumberland County Council Order 1914 Provisional Order for putting in force the Lands Clauses Acts.	
	Surrey County Council (No. 1) Order 1914 Provisional Order (No. 1) for putting in force the Lands Clauses Acts.	
	Surrey County Council (No. 2) Order 1914 Provisional Order (No. 2.) for putting in force the Lands Clauses Acts.	
	Swansea County Borough Council (No. 1) Order 1914 Provisional Order (No. 1) for putting in force the Lands Clauses Acts.	
	Swansea County Borough Council (No. 2) Order 1914 Provisional Order (No. 2) for putting in force the Lands Clauses Acts.	
Education Board Provisional Order Confirmation (London) Act 1914	4 & 5 Geo. 5. c. cxxvi	31 July 1914
An Act to confirm a Provisional Order made by the Board of Education under the Education Acts 1870 to 1911 to enable the London County Council to put in force the Lands Clauses Acts.
	London County Council Order 1914 Provisional Order for putting in force the Lands Clauses Acts.	
Local Government Board's Provisional Orders Confirmation (Gas) Act 1914	4 & 5 Geo. 5. c. cxxvii	31 July 1914
An Act to confirm certain Provisional Orders of the Local Government Board relating to Bourne and Wokingham.
	Bourne Gas Order 1914 Provisional Order under the Gas and Water Works Facilities Act 1870.	
	Wokingham Gas Order 1914 Provisional Order under the Gas and Water Works Facilities Act 1870 and the Gas and Water Works Facilities Act 1870 Amendment Act 1873. (Note: Gas and Water Works Facilities Act 1870 Amendment Act 1873 (36 & 37 Vict. c. 89))	
Local Government Board's Provisional Order Confirmation (Housing) Act 1914	4 & 5 Geo. 5. c. cxxviii	31 July 1914
An Act to confirm a Provisional Order of the Local Government Board relating to Okehampton (Rural).
	Okehampton Rural (Housing) Order 1914 Provisional Order made in pursuance of the Housing Town Planning &c. Act 1909. (Note: Housing, Town Planning, etc. Act 1909 (9 Edw. 7. c. 44))	
Local Government Board's Provisional Order Confirmation (No. 8) Act 1914 (repealed)	4 & 5 Geo. 5. c. cxxix	31 July 1914
An Act to confirm a Provisional Order of the Local Government Board relating to Bournemouth. (Repealed by Bournemouth Borough Council Act 1985 (c. v))
	Bournemouth (Extension) Order 1914 Provisional Order made in pursuance of the Local Government Act 1888 for extending a County Borough.	
Local Government Board's Provisional Order Confirmation (No. 9) Act 1914	4 & 5 Geo. 5. c. cxxx	31 July 1914
An Act to confirm a Provisional Order of the Local Government Board relating to Chippenham.
	Chippenham (Extension) Order 1914 Provisional Order made in pursuance of the Local Government Act 1888 for extending a Borough.	
Local Government Board's Provisional Orders Confirmation (No. 10) Act 1914	4 & 5 Geo. 5. c. cxxxi	31 July 1914
An Act to confirm certain Provisional Orders of the Local Government Board relating to Bognor Bury Louth Pontefract Rotherham (two) and the District of the Derwent Valley Water Board.
	Bognor Order 1914 Provisional Order for altering the Local Act 5 & 6 William IV. c. cі. (Note: Bognor Improvement Act 1835 (5 & 6 Will. 4. c. ci))	
	Bury Order 1914 (No. 1) Provisional Order to enable the Urban Sanitary Authority for the Borough of Bury to put in force the Compulsory Clauses of the Lands Clauses Acts.	
	Louth Order 1914 Provisional Order for partially repealing and altering the Local Act 6 Geo. IV., c. CXXIX., (Note: Louth Improvement Act 1825 (6 Geo. 4. c. cxxix)) and the Louth Markets and Fairs Act 1849. (Note: Louth Markets and Fairs Act 1849 (12 & 13 Vict. c. lxxviii))	
	Pontefract Order 1914 Provisional Order for altering the Pontefract Corporation Act 1906. (Note: Pontefract Corporation Act 1906 (6 Edw. 7. c. cxc))	
	Rotherham Order 1914 (No. 1) Provisional Order to enable the Urban Sanitary Authority for the Borough of Rotherham to put in force the Compulsory Clauses of the Lands Clauses Acts.	
	Rotherham Order 1914 (No. 2) Provisional Order for altering the Rotherham Corporation Act 1911. (Note: Rotherham Corporation Act 1911 (1 & 2 Geo. 5. c. cxvi))	
	Derwent Valley Water Order 1914 Provisional Order for altering the Derwent Valley Water Acts 1899 (Note: Derwent Valley Water Act 1899 (62 & 63 Vict. c. cclxix)) and 1901. (Note: Derwent Valley Water Act 1901 (1 Edw. 7. c. lxxx))	
Local Government Board's Provisional Orders Confirmation (No. 12) Act 1914	4 & 5 Geo. 5. c. cxxxii	31 July 1914
An Act to confirm certain Provisional Orders of the Local Government Board relating to Abercarn Barking Town Barrow-in-Furness Liverpool Newcastle-upon-Tyne Scunthorpe and Whitby.
	Abercarn Order 1914 Provisional Order to enable the Urban District Council of Abercarn to put in force the Compulsory Clauses of the Lands Clauses Acts.	
	Barking Town Order 1914 Provisional Order to enable the Urban District Council of Barking Town to put in force the Compulsory Clauses of the Lands Clauses Acts.	
	Barrow-in-Furness Order 1914 Provisional Order for altering certain Local Acts.	
	Liverpool Order 1914 Provisional Order for altering certain Local Acts and a Confirming Act. (Note: Local Government Board's Provisional Orders Confirmation (No. 4) Act 1907 (7 Edw. 7. c. cliv))	
	Newcastle-upon-Tyne Order 1914 Provisional Order for altering the Newcastle-upon-Tyne Improvement Act 1892. (Note: Newcastle-upon-Tyne Improvement Act 1892 (55 & 56 Vict. c. ccxxxvi))	
	Scunthorpe Order 1914 Provisional Order for altering the Scunthorpe Urban District Gas and Water Act 1899 (Note: Scunthorpe Urban District Gas and Water Act 1899 (62 & 63 Vict. c. xcvii)) and certain Confirming Acts.	
	Whitby Order 1914 Provisional Order for partially repealing and altering the Whitby Urban District Council Act 1905. (Note: Whitby Urban District Council Act 1905 (5 Edw. 7. c. cxxxv))	
Local Government Board's Provisional Orders Confirmation (No. 13) Act 1914	4 & 5 Geo. 5. c. cxxxiii	31 July 1914
An Act to confirm certain Provisional Orders of the Local Government Board relating to Bury Cambridge Southampton and Stafford.
	Bury Order 1914 (No. 2) Provisional Order for partially repealing the Bury Corporation Act 1909. (Note: Bury Corporation Act 1909 (9 Edw. 7. c. clix))	
	Cambridge Order 1914 Provisional Order to enable the Urban District Council for the Borough of Cambridge to put in force the Compulsory Clauses of the Lands Clauses Acts.	
	Southampton Order 1914 (No. 2) Provisional Order for altering the Southampton Corporation Act 1910. (Note: Southampton Corporation Act 1910 (10 Edw. 7 & 1 Geo. 5. c. cxiii))	
	Stafford Order 1914 Provisional Order for altering the Stafford Corporation Act 1876 (Note: Stafford Corporation Act 1876 (39 & 40 Vict. c. cxcvi)) the Stafford Corporation Act 1880 (Note: Stafford Corporation Act 1880 (43 & 44 Vict. c. lxxiii)) and certain Conforming Acts.	
Local Government Board's Provisional Order Confirmation (No. 14) Act 1914	4 & 5 Geo. 5. c. cxxxiv	31 July 1914
An Act to confirm a Provisional Order of the Local Government Board relating to Birmingham.
	Birmingham (Water and Gas) Order 1914 Provisional Order for partially repealing and altering the Birmingham Corporation (Consolidation) Act 1883 (Note: Birmingham Corporation (Consolidation) Act 1883 (46 & 47 Vict. c. lxx)) and the Birmingham Corporation Water Acts 1892 (Note: Birmingham Corporation Water Act 1892 (55 & 56 Vict. c. clxxiii)) 1896 (Note: Birmingham Corporation Water Act 1896 (59 & 60 Vict. c. xxxii)) and 1902. (Note: Birmingham Corporation Water Act 1902 (2 Edw. 7. c. xviii))	
Local Government Board's Provisional Orders Confirmation (No. 15) Act 1914	4 & 5 Geo. 5. c. cxxxv	31 July 1914
An Act to confirm certain Provisional Orders of the Local Government Board relating to the Amman Valley and the Ludworth and Mellor Joint Sewerage Districts the Halstead Joint Hospital District and the East Wilts United Districts.
	Amman Valley Joint Sewerage Order 1914 Provisional Order for forming a United District under Section 279 of the Public Health Act 1875. (Note: Public Health Act 1875 (38 & 39 Vict. c. 55))	
	Ludworth, Mellor and Low Marple Joint Sewerage Order 1914 Provisional Order for altering a Confirming Act. (Note: Local Government Board's Provisional Orders Confirmation (No. 9) Act 1899 (62 & 63 Vict. c. cxlvii))	
	Halstead Joint Hospital Order 1914 Provisional Order for forming a United District under Section 279 of the Public Health Act 1875.	
	East Wiltshire United District (Medical Officer of Health) Order 1914 Provisional Order for Union of Districts under Section 280 of the Public Health Act 1875.	
Local Government Board's Provisional Orders Confirmation (No. 16) Act 1914	4 & 5 Geo. 5. c. cxxxvi	31 July 1914
An Act to confirm certain Provisional Orders of the Local Government Board relating to Bournemouth and Bradford.
	Bournemouth Order 1914 Provisional Order to enable the Urban Sanitary Authority for the Borough of Bournemouth to put in force the Compulsory Clauses of the Lands Clauses Acts.	
	Bradford Order 1914 Provisional Order to enable the Urban Sanitary Authority for the City of Bradford to put in force the Compulsory Clauses of the Lands Clauses Acts.	
Local Government Board's Provisional Orders Confirmation (No. 17) Act 1914	4 & 5 Geo. 5. c. cxxxvii	31 July 1914
An Act to confirm certain Provisional Orders of the Local Government Board relating to Chatham and the Rochester and Chatham Joint Sewerage District.
	Chatham Order 1914 Provisional Order to enable the Urban District Council for the Borough of Chatham to put in force the Compulsory Clauses of the Lands Clauses Acts.	
	Rochester and Chatham Joint Sewerage Order 1914 Provisional Order for forming a United District under Section 279 of the Public Health Act 1875.	
Local Government Board's Provisional Orders Confirmation (No. 22) Act 1914	4 & 5 Geo. 5. c. cxxxviii	31 July 1914
An Act to confirm certain Provisional Orders of the Local Government Board relating to Llandudno and the Rothwell Joint Cemetery District.
	Llandudno Order 1914 Provisional Order for altering the Llandudno Urban District Council Act 1897. (Note: Llandudno Urban District Council Act 1897 (60 & 61 Vict. c. clxxxv))	
	Rothwell Joint Cemetery Order 1914 Provisional Order for forming a United District under Section 279 of the Public Health Act 1875.	
Leighton Buzzard Gas Act 1914	4 & 5 Geo. 5. c. cxxxix	7 August 1914
An Act to extend the limits of supply of the Leighton Buzzard Gas Company to authorise the Company to raise additional capital and for other purposes.
Gas Light and Coke Company's Act 1914	4 & 5 Geo. 5. c. cxl	7 August 1914
An Act to amend the enactments relating to the calorific power of the gas supplied by the Gas Light and Coke Company and to relieve that Company from their obligations as to the illuminating power of such gas and for other purposes.
Leeds Corporation Act 1914 (repealed)	4 & 5 Geo. 5. c. cxli	7 August 1914
An Act to confer further powers upon the lord mayor aldermen and citizens of the city of Leeds in regard to their tramways undertaking to empower them to construct street improvements and for other purposes. (Repealed by West Yorkshire Act 1980 (c.xiv))
Edenbridge and District Gas Act 1914	4 & 5 Geo. 5. c. cxlii	7 August 1914
An Act for incorporating and conferring powers on the Edenbridge and District Gas Company.
Midland Railway Act 1914	4 & 5 Geo. 5. c. cxliii	7 August 1914
An Act to confer additional powers upon the Midland Railway Company and the Cheshire Lines Committee for the construction of works and upon that Company and Committee and the Midland and Great Northern Railways Joint Committee for the acquisition of lands and for other purposes.
Skegness Urban District Council Act 1914	4 & 5 Geo. 5. c. cxliv	7 August 1914
An Act to confer upon the Skegness Urban District Council powers in relation to the supply of electricity the provision of motor omnibuses and to the local government of the district.
South Western and Isle of Wight Junction Railway Act 1914	4 & 5 Geo. 5. c. cxlv	7 August 1914
An Act to revive the powers for the compulsory purchase of lands and extend the periods for the completion of the railways pier and works authorised by the South Western and Isle of Wight Junction Railway Acts 1901 (Note: South Western and Isle of Wight Junction Railway Act 1901 (1 Edw. 7. c. xcix)) 1903 (Note: South Western and Isle of Wight Junction Railway Act 1903 (3 Edw. 7. c. ccxliv)) and 1909 (Note: South Western and Isle of Wight Junction Railway Act 1909 (9 Edw. 7. c. lxix)) to empower the South Western and Isle of Wight Junction Railway Company to raise additional capital and for other purposes.
Manchester Corporation Act 1914	4 & 5 Geo. 5. c. cxlvi	7 August 1914
An Act to confer further powers upon the lord mayor aldermen and citizens of the city of Manchester with reference to street works waterworks tramways main drainage works and the supply of electricity and otherwise for the better local government and improvement of the city to alter the wards thereof and for other purposes.
West Gloucestershire Water Act 1914	4 & 5 Geo. 5. c. cxlvii	7 August 1914
An Act for authorising the West Gloucestershire Water Company to construct new works for extending their limits of supply and for other purposes.
Alexandra (Newport and South Wales) Docks and Railway Act 1914	4 & 5 Geo. 5. c. cxlviii	7 August 1914
An Act to authorise the Alexandra (Newport and South Wales) Docks and Railway Company to construct railways in the county of Monmouth and for other purposes.
London County Council (Tramways and Improvements) Act 1914	4 & 5 Geo. 5. c. cxlix	7 August 1914
An Act to empower the London County Council to construct and work a tramway to make street improvements and other works and for other purposes.
Northwich Urban District Council Act 1914	4 & 5 Geo. 5. c. cl	7 August 1914
An Act to authorise the Urban District Council of Northwich to construct new waterworks and to acquire additional lands to sanction and confirm the construction of existing waterworks to extend the limits for the supply of water by the Council to confer further powers on the Council in regard to their water undertaking and to make further and better provision for the improvement health and local government of the district and for other purposes.
Riddings District Gas Act 1914	4 & 5 Geo. 5. c. cli	7 August 1914
An Act to extend the limits of supply of the Riddings District Gas Company and to empower them to acquire the undertaking of the Pinxton Gas Light and Coke Company Limited and for other purposes.
Southend-on-Sea Gas Act 1914	4 & 5 Geo. 5. c. clii	7 August 1914
An Act to extend the limits for the supply of gas by the Southend Gas Company and for other purposes.
Wadhurst and District Gas Act 1914	4 & 5 Geo. 5. c. cliii	7 August 1914
An Act for incorporating and conferring powers on the Wadhurst and District Gas and Coke Company and to enable them to acquire the gas undertaking of the Ticehurst and District Water and Gas Company.
Brecon and Merthyr Railway Act 1914	4 & 5 Geo. 5. c. cliv	7 August 1914
An Act to authorise the Brecon and Merthyr Tydfil Junction Railway Company to acquire additional lands to confirm an agreement with the Rhymney Railway Company with reference to running powers and to raise further money and for other purposes.
Poole Harbour Act 1914	4 & 5 Geo. 5. c. clv	7 August 1914
An Act to extend and define the limits of the harbour of Poole to authorise the Poole Harbour Commissioners to construct works to acquire lands and to raise additional money to confer further powers upon the Commissioners and for other purposes.
Great Northern Railway Act 1914	4 & 5 Geo. 5. c. clvi	7 August 1914
An Act to authorise the Great Northern Railway Company to construct certain deviation railways and widenings of railway and other works and to acquire lands and to confer further powers upon that Company to extend the time for the completion of certain works and the purchase of certain lands and for other purposes.
Hayward's Heath Gas Act 1914	4 & 5 Geo. 5. c. clvii	7 August 1914
An Act to extend and define the limits of supply of the Hayward's Heath District Gas Company to provide for the conversion of the existing capital of the Company and to confer further powers upon the Company.
Newcastle-upon-Tyne Corporation Act 1914 (repealed)	4 & 5 Geo. 5. c. clviii	7 August 1914
An Act to enable the lord mayor aldermen and citizens of the city and county of Newcastle-upon-Tyne to construct and work additional tramways in the urban districts of Longbenton and Weetslade to raise further money and for other purposes. (Repealed by Tyne and Wear Act 1980 (c. xliii))
Ossett Corporation Act 1914	4 & 5 Geo. 5. c. clix	7 August 1914
An Act to confer further powers upon the Mayor Aldermen and Burgesses of the borough of Ossett with respect to the disposal of trade refuse and to make further provision in regard to the water and gas undertakings of the Corporation and the health local government and improvement of the borough and for other purposes.
Walsall Corporation Act 1914	4 & 5 Geo. 5. c. clx	7 August 1914
An Act to authorise the mayor aldermen and burgesses of the borough of Walsall to construct street works and a tramway to provide and work trolley vehicles and motor omnibuses to make further provision with regard to the supply of gas and electricity to make provision for increasing the number of wards of the borough and the number of councillors and aldermen and to make further provision with regard to the health local government and improvement of the borough and for other purposes.
St. Anne's-on-the-Sea Improvement Act 1914 (repealed)	4 & 5 Geo. 5. c. clxi	7 August 1914
An Act to enable the urban district council of St. Anne's-on-the-Sea to acquire the Ashton Gardens and other properties and to confer further powers upon the Council in regard to the supply of gas and electricity and to the local government of the district. (Repealed by Lytham St. Anne's Corporation Act 1923 (13 & 14 Geo. 5. c. lxxxvi))
Bristol Corporation (Tramways) Act 1914	4 & 5 Geo. 5. c. clxii	7 August 1914
An Act to provide for the purchase by the Corporation of Bristol of the undertaking of the Bristol Tramways and Carriage Company Limited to empower the Corporation to work any tramways purchased by or belonging to them to enter into agreements for the purchase or working of tramways and for other purposes.
Porthcawl Urban District Council Act 1914	4 & 5 Geo. 5. c. clxiii	7 August 1914
An Act to provide for the transfer of the undertaking of the Porthcawl and District Gas Company to the urban district council of Porthcawl to confer further powers on the Council with respect to the supply of gas and water to empower the Council to maintain the harbour at Porthcawl and to make further and better provision for the improvement health and local government of the district and for other purposes.
Wimbledon Corporation Act 1914	4 & 5 Geo. 5. c. clxiv	7 August 1914
An Act to authorise the Mayor Aldermen and Burgesses of the borough of Wimbledon to purchase lands in and adjoining the borough to divide the Saint Mary's and South Park Wards of the borough and to make further provision in regard to the electricity undertaking of the Corporation and the health local government and improve- ment of the borough and for other purposes.
Great Central Railway (Pension Fund) Act 1914	4 & 5 Geo. 5. c. clxv	7 August 1914
An Act to remove doubts concerning the pension fund of the Great Central Railway Company's salaried officers and clerks and to restore the pension rights of the members of that fund.
Weston-super-Mare Urban District Council Act 1914	4 & 5 Geo. 5. c. clxvi	7 August 1914
An Act to enable the Urban District Council of Weston-super-Mare to construct additional waterworks to enlarge the cemetery to acquire lands to borrow additional moneys and to confer upon that Council various powers for the health and good government of the district and for other purposes.
Wesleyan and General Assurance Society Act 1914 (repealed)	4 & 5 Geo. 5. c. clxvii	7 August 1914
An Act to incorporate the Wesleyan and General Assurance Society and to provide for the management of its affairs and to confer further powers upon the Society and for other purposes. (Repealed by Wesleyan Assurance Society Act 1989 (c. viii))
Glasgow (Tramways, Bridges, &c.) Act 1914	4 & 5 Geo. 5. c. clxviii	7 August 1914
An Act to authorise the Corporation of the city of Glasgow to construct tramways and street works bridges and sewers to borrow money and for other purposes.
City of London (Various Powers) Act 1914	4 & 5 Geo. 5. c. clxix	7 August 1914
An Act to authorise the Corporation of London to execute street improvements at Spitalfields to make provision with respect to the use and testing of high-pressure gas meters within the city of London and for other purposes.
Clergy Mutual Assurance Society Act 1914	4 & 5 Geo. 5. c. clxx	7 August 1914
An Act to incorporate the Clergy Mutual Assurance Society and to provide for the management of its affairs and for other purposes.
Isle of Thanet Gas Act 1914	4 & 5 Geo. 5. c. clxxi	7 August 1914
An Act to enable the Isle of Thanet Gaslight and Coke Company to raise additional capital and for other purposes.
London County Council (Money) Act 1914 (repealed)	4 & 5 Geo. 5. c. clxxii	7 August 1914
An Act to regulate the expenditure on capital account and lending of money by the London County Council during the financial period from the first day of April one thousand nine hundred and fourteen to the thirtieth day of September one thousand nine hundred and fifteen and to enable the said Council to raise money by mortgage. (Repealed by London County Council (Loans) Act 1955 (4 & 5 Eliz. 2. c. xxvi))
Oxford and District Tramways Act 1914 (repealed)	4 & 5 Geo. 5. c. clxxiii	7 August 1914
An Act to confirm an agreement between the City of Oxford Electric Tramways Limited and the mayor alder- men and citizens of the city of Oxford for the transfer to and removal by the corporation of the Company's tramways and for the provision by the Company of a service of motor omnibuses in lieu thereof and for other purposes. (Repealed by Oxford Motor Services Act 1921 (11 & 12 Geo. 5. c. ix))
Weymouth and Melcombe Regis Corporation Act 1914	4 & 5 Geo. 5. c. clxxiv	7 August 1914
An Act to authorise the mayor aldermen and burgesses of the borough of Weymouth and Melcombe Regis to reconstruct the Weymouth Swing Bridge and the Backwater Bridge and to make other works upon and to fill in the Backwater and to confer further powers upon the Corporation with respect to the regulation management and good government of the borough and for other purposes.
Electric Lighting Orders Confirmation (No. 5) Act 1914	4 & 5 Geo. 5. c. clxxv	7 August 1914
An Act to confirm certain Provisional Orders made by the Board of Trade under the Electric Lighting Acts 1882 to 1909 relating to Castlebar Lurgan and Waterford.
	Castlebar Electric Lighting Order 1914 Provisional Order granted by the Board of Trade under the Electric Lighting Acts 1882 to 1909 to Messrs. J. Bourke and Sons in respect of the urban district of Castlebar in the county of Mayo.	
	Lurgan Electric Lighting Order 1914 Provisional Order granted by the Board of Trade under the Electric Lighting Acts 1882 to 1909 to the urban district council of Lurgan in respect of the urban district of Lurgan in the county of Armagh.	
	Waterford Electric Lighting Order 1914 Provisional Order granted by the Board of Trade under the Electric Lighting Acts 1882 to 1909 to the mayor aldermen and burgesses of the county borough of Waterford in respect of the county borough of Waterford.	
Gas Order Confirmation (No. 2) Act 1914	4 & 5 Geo. 5. c. clxxvi	7 August 1914
An Act to confirm a Provisional Order made by the Board of Trade under the Gas and Water Works Facilities Act 1870 relating to Balcombe Petrol Gas.
	Balcombe Petrol Gas Order 1914 Order authorising the construction and maintenance of Gasworks and Works connected therewith and the supply of Petrol Gas in part of the Parish of Balcombe within the Rural District of Cuckfield in the County of Sussex.	
Gas Orders Confirmation (No. 3) Act 1914	4 & 5 Geo. 5. c. clxxvii	7 August 1914
An Act to confirm certain Provisional Orders made by the Board of Trade under the Gas and Water Works Facilities Act 1870 relating to East Kent Gas Garstang Gas Harpenden District Gas St. Ives (Hunts) Gas and Swansea Gas.
	East Kent Gas Order 1914 Order authorising the construction of gasworks for the manufacture of gas for the supply of certain parishes in the rural district of Elham in the eastern division of the county of Kent.	
	Garstang Gas Order 1914 Order authorising the Garstang Gas Company Limited to extend their limits of supply and to raise additional capital and for other purposes.	
	Harpenden District Gas Order 1914 Order empowering the Harpenden District Gas Company to extend their limits of supply and to raise additional capital and for other purposes.	
	St. Ives (Hunts.) Gas Order 1914 Order extending the limits of supply of the St. Ives (Hunts) Gas Company Limited empowering the Company to acquire additional lands to construct additional gasworks and to raise additional capital and for other purposes.	
	Swansea Gas Order 1914 Order to empower the Swansea Gas Light Company to construct and maintain further works for the manufacture and storage of gas and to repeal the Swansea Gas Order 1912.	
Glasgow Corporation Order Confirmation Act 1914	4 & 5 Geo. 5. c. clxxviii	7 August 1914
An Act to confirm a Provisional Order under the Private Legislation Procedure (Scotland) Act 1899 relating to Glasgow Corporation.
	Glasgow Corporation Order 1914 Provisional Order to confer further powers on the Corporation of the City of Glasgow with respect to the public lighting of the City the alteration of incidence of rates and charges for lighting streets courts and common stairs the regulation and control of metal refiners Police and Sanitary matters and the borrowing of further money to extend the Boundaries of the County of the Barony and Regality of Glasgow to authorise the closing of rights of way and the confirming of agreements with respect thereto and for other purposes.	
Clyde Navigation Order Confirmation Act 1914	4 & 5 Geo. 5. c. clxxix	7 August 1914
An Act to confirm a Provisional Order under the Private Legislation Procedure (Scotland) Act 1899 relating to Clyde Navigation.
	Clyde Navigation Order 1914 Provisional Order to authorise the Trustees of the Clyde Navigation to construct tidal basins and other works on the River Clyde to borrow additional money and for other purposes.	
Local Government Board's Provisional Order Confirmation (No. 20) Act 1914 (repealed)	4 & 5 Geo. 5. c. clxxx	7 August 1914
An Act to confirm a Provisional Order of the Local Government Board relating to Doncaster. (Repealed by Statute Law (Repeals) Act 1989 (c. 43))
	Doncaster (Extension) Order 1914 Provisional Order made in pursuance of the Local Government Act 1888 for extending a Borough.	
Pier and Harbour Orders Confirmation (No. 2) Act 1914	4 & 5 Geo. 5. c. clxxxi	7 August 1914
An Act to confirm certain Provisional Orders made by the Board of Trade under the General Pier and Harbour Act 1861 relating to Brighton and Hastings.
	Brighton Marine Palace and Pier Order 1914 Order authorising a further Widening of the Brighton Marine Palace and Pier in the County Borough of Brighton in the County of Sussex and for other purposes.	
	Hastings Corporation (Pier) Order 1914 Order authorising the Corporation of Hastings to acquire the shore end of the existing Pier and adjoining property and utilise the site for extending or widening the Esplanade or Promenade at Hastings in the County of Sussex and for other purposes.	
Local Government Board's Provisional Order Confirmation (No. 3) Act 1914 (repealed)	4 & 5 Geo. 5. c. clxxxii	10 August 1914
An Act to confirm a Provisional Order of the Local Government Board relating to Wakefield. (Repealed by West Yorkshire Act 1980 (c. xiv))
	County Borough of Wakefield Order 1913 Provisional Order made in pursuance of the Local Government Act 1888 for constituting a County Borough and for altering certain Confirming Acts.	
Local Government Board's Provisional Order Confirmation (No. 18) Act 1914 (repealed)	4 & 5 Geo. 5. c. clxxxiii	10 August 1914
An Act to confirm a Provisional Order of the Local Government Board relating to Devonport Plymouth and East Stonehouse. (Repealed by Statute Law (Repeals) Act 1993 (c. 50))
	Borough of Plymouth Order 1914 Provisional Order made in pursuance of the Local Government Act 1888 for uniting and extending County Boroughs.	
Local Government Board's Provisional Order Confirmation (No. 19) Act 1914 (repealed)	4 & 5 Geo. 5. c. clxxxiv	10 August 1914
An Act to confirm a Provisional Order of the Local Government Board relating to Worcester. (Repealed by Worcester City Council Act 1985 (c. xliii))
	Worcester (Extension) Order 1914 Provisional Order made in pursuance of the Local Government Act 1888 for extending a County Borough.	
Kirkcaldy Corporation Order Confirmation Act 1914 (repealed)	4 & 5 Geo. 5. c. clxxxv	10 August 1914
An Act to confirm a Provisional Order under the Private Legislation Procedure (Scotland) Act 1899 relating to Kirkcaldy Corporation. (Repealed by Kirkcaldy Corporation Order Confirmation Act 1939 (2 & 3 Geo. 6. c. vi))
	Kirkcaldy Corporation Order 1914 Provisional Order to repeal the provisions of the Kirkcaldy Burgh and Harbour Act 1876 (Note: Kirkcaldy Burgh and Harbour Act 1876 (39 & 40 Vict. c. clxxix)) relating to the footways in the district annexed to the Burgh by that Act and to substitute therefor the provisions of the Burgh Police Acts to define the limits within which the Corporation may supply gas to make provision as to office of Town Clerk accident insurance fund enlargement and maintenance of Philp Memorial Hall and for other purposes.	
Wick Harbour Order Confirmation Act 1914	4 & 5 Geo. 5. c. clxxxvi	10 August 1914
An Act to confirm a Provisional Order under the Private Legislation Procedure (Scotland) Act 1899 relating to Wick Harbour.
	Wick Harbour Order 1914 Provisional Order to authorise the Wick Harbour Trustees to construct additional Works to amend the Wick and Pulteney Harbours Acts 1879 to 1903 to confer borrowing powers and for other purposes.	
Edinburgh and District Water Order Confirmation Act 1914	4 & 5 Geo. 5. c. clxxxvii	10 August 1914
An Act to confirm a Provisional Order under the Private Legislation Procedure (Scotland) Act 1899 relating to Edinburgh and District Water.
	Edinburgh and District Water Order 1914 Provisional Order to authorise the Edinburgh and District Water Trustees to construct additional works and to sanction certain works already constructed to vary and amend the existing provisions with respect to Glencorse Burn and Glencorse Reservoir and compensation water therefrom to make further provision with respect to water from the Talla Aqueduct to borrow further money and for other purposes.	
York Corporation Act 1914	4 & 5 Geo. 5. c. clxxxviii	10 August 1914
An Act to empower the lord mayor aldermen and citizens of the city of York to construct a new street and street improvements and to provide and run trolley vehicles and motor omnibuses to make further provision in regard to their light railway electricity and markets undertakings and the health local government and improvement of the city and for other purposes.
Sheffield Corporation Act 1914 (repealed)	4 & 5 Geo. 5. c. clxxxix	10 August 1914
An Act to authorise the Corporation of the city of Sheffield to execute certain street improvements and to construct an additional tramway to confer on the Corporation further powers with respect to their markets undertaking to extend the boundaries of the city and for other purposes. (Repealed by Sheffield Corporation (Consolidation) Act 1918 (8 & 9 Geo. 5. c. lxi))
Blyth Hall (Transfer) Order Confirmation Act 1914	4 & 5 Geo. 5. c. cxc	28 August 1914
An Act to confirm a Provisional Order under the Private Legislation Procedure (Scotland) Act 1899 relating to Blyth Hall (Transfer).
	Blyth Hall (Transfer) Order 1914 Provisional Order to transfer the Blyth Hall Newport and the endowments thereof to the provost magistrates and councillors of the burgh of Newport and for other purposes.	
Coatbridge Drainage and Burgh Extension Order Confirmation Act 1914	4 & 5 Geo. 5. c. cxci	28 August 1914
An Act to confirm a Provisional Order under the Private Legislation Procedure (Scotland) Act 1899 relating to Coatbridge Drainage and Burgh Extension.
	Coatbridge Drainage and Burgh Extension Order 1914 Provisional Order to authorise the Provost Magistrates and Councillors of the Burgh of Coatbridge to construct and maintain main and branch sewers and sewage purification works to acquire lands for sewage purification to extend the boundaries of the said burgh and for other purposes.	
Dumbarton Burgh (Water, &c.) Order Confirmation Act 1914	4 & 5 Geo. 5. c. cxcii	28 August 1914
An Act to confirm a Provisional Order under the Private Legislation Procedure (Scotland) Act 1899 relating to Dumbarton Burgh (Water &c.).
	Dumbarton Burgh (Water, &c.) Order 1914 Provisional Order to authorise the Provost Magistrates and Councillors of the Burgh of Dumbarton to construct additional waterworks to borrow money for their water and gas undertakings to alter the quality of gas supplied by them to confirm an agreement as to the supply of electricity in the burgh and for other purposes.	
North British Railway (Invergarry and Fort Augustus Railway Vesting) Order Confirmation Act 1914	4 & 5 Geo. 5. c. cxciii	28 August 1914
An Act to confirm a Provisional Order under the Private Legislation Procedure (Scotland) Act 1899 relating to North British Railway (Invergarry and Fort Augustus Railway Vesting).
	North British Railway (Invergarry and Fort Augustus Railway Vesting) Order 1914 Provisional Order to provide for the vesting of the undertaking of the Invergarry and Fort Augustus Railway Company in the North British Railway Company and for other purposes.	

=== Private and personal acts ===
Short title	Citation	Royal assent
Long title
De Trafford Estate Act 1914	4 & 5 Geo. 5. c. 1 Pr.	31 July 1914
An Act to amend the De Trafford Estate Act 1904 (Note: De Trafford Estate Act 1904 (4 Edw. 7. c. 3 Pr.)) and to extend the powers of the Trustees of the will of Sir Humphrey de Trafford and to approve a resettlement of the De Trafford Estates dated the eighth day of May one thousand nine hundred and fourteen and for other purposes.
Falkland and Pluscarden Estates Act 1914	4 & 5 Geo. 5. c. 2 Pr.	31 July 1914
An Act to appoint Trustees and confer powers of sale and other powers with reference to the estates of Falkland and Pluscarden and for other purposes.
Hesketh Estate (Flood Defences) Act 1914	4 & 5 Geo. 5. c. 3 Pr.	31 July 1914
An Act to establish Commissioners to maintain flood defences in the parish of Hesketh-with-Becconsall in the county of Lancaster and to transfer certain lands and works to and to confer powers on such Commissioners and for other purposes.

=== Sources ===
- The Public General Acts of the Fourth and Fifth Years of the Reign of His Majesty King George the Fifth. London: Eyre and Spottiswoode. 1914 – via HathiTrust.

== 5 & 6 Geo. 5 ==
The fifth session of the 30th Parliament of the United Kingdom, which met from 11 November 1914 until 27 January 1916.

This session was also traditionally cited as 5 & 6 G. 5.

=== Public general acts ===
Short title	Citation	Royal assent
Long title
Anglo-Portuguese Commercial Treaty Act 1914	5 & 6 Geo. 5. c. 1	27 November 1914
An Act to make such provisions as are necessary to enable the Anglo-Portuguese Commercial Treaty to come into force.
Customs (Exportation Restriction) Act 1914 (Note: This act has the same short title as the Customs (Exportation Prohibition) Act 1914 (4 & 5 Geo. 5. c. 64)) (repealed)	5 & 6 Geo. 5. c. 2	27 November 1914
An Act to amend section one of the Exportation of Arms Act, 1900. (Note: Exportation of Arms Act 1900 (63 & 64 Vict. c. 44)) (Repealed by Statute Law (Repeals) Act 1986 (c. 12))
House of Commons (Commissions in His Majesty's Forces) Act 1914 (repealed)	5 & 6 Geo. 5. c. 3	27 November 1914
An Act to prevent the Acceptance of a Commission in His Majesty's Forces vacating the Seat of a Member of Parliament, or rendering a person holding such a Commission incapable of being elected to, or sitting or voting in, the Commons House of Parliament. (Repealed by Statute Law Revision Act 1927 (17 & 18 Geo. 5. c. 42))
Land Drainage Act 1914 (repealed)	5 & 6 Geo. 5. c. 4	27 November 1914
An Act to make better provision for the execution and maintenance of Land Drainage Works. (Repealed by Land Drainage Act 1930 (20 & 21 Geo. 5. c. 44))
Sheriff Courts (Scotland) Amendment Act 1914 (repealed)	5 & 6 Geo. 5. c. 5	27 November 1914
An Act to amend section sixteen of the Sheriff Courts (Scotland) Act, 1907, (Note: Sheriff Courts (Scotland) Act 1907 (7 Edw. 7. c. 51)) relating to leave of absence to salaried Sheriffs-substitute. (Repealed by Statute Law Revision Act 1927 (17 & 18 Geo. 5. c. 42))
Consolidated Fund (No. 1) Act 1914 (Session 2) (repealed)	5 & 6 Geo. 5. c. 6	27 November 1914
An Act to apply a sum out of the Consolidated Fund to the service of the year ending on the thirty-first day of March one thousand nine hundred and fifteen. (Repealed by Statute Law Revision Act 1927 (17 & 18 Geo. 5. c. 42))
Finance Act 1914 (Session 2) (repealed)	5 & 6 Geo. 5. c. 7	27 November 1914
An Act to grant certain additional duties of Customs and Inland Revenue, including Excise, to alter other duties, and to amend the Law relating to Customs and Inland Revenue, including Excise, and the National Debt, and to make further provision in connection with Finance. (Repealed by National Debt Act 1958 (7 & 8 Eliz. 2. c. 6))
Defence of the Realm Consolidation Act 1914 (repealed)	5 & 6 Geo. 5. c. 8	27 November 1914
An Act to consolidate and amend the Defence of the Realm Acts. (Repealed by Statute Law Revision Act 1927 (17 & 18 Geo. 5. c. 42))
Criminal Justice Administration (Postponement) Act 1914 (repealed)	5 & 6 Geo. 5. c. 9	27 November 1914
An Act to postpone the commencement of the Criminal Justice Administration Act, 1914. (Note: Criminal Justice Administration Act 1914 (4 & 5 Geo. 5. c. 58)) (Repealed by Statute Law Revision Act 1927 (17 & 18 Geo. 5. c. 42))
Local Authorities (Disqualification Relief) Act 1914 (repealed)	5 & 6 Geo. 5. c. 10	27 November 1914
An Act to extend, in respect of the present War, the relief from disqualification for office granted by the Members of Local Authorities Relief Act, 1900. (Note: Members of Local Authorities Relief Act 1900 (63 & 64 Vict. c. 46)) (Repealed by Statute Law Revision Act 1927 (17 & 18 Geo. 5. c. 42))
Government War Obligations Act 1914 (repealed)	5 & 6 Geo. 5. c. 11	27 November 1914
An Act to make provision with respect to obligations incurred by or on behalf of His Majesty's Government for the purposes of the present war or in connection therewith and for other purposes in relation thereto. (Repealed by Statute Law Revision Act 1958 (6 & 7 Eliz. 2. c. 46))
Trading with the Enemy Amendment Act 1914 (repealed)	5 & 6 Geo. 5. c. 12	27 November 1914
An Act to amend the Trading with the Enemy Act, 1914, (Note: Trading with the Enemy Act 1914 (4 & 5 Geo. 5. c. 87)) and for purposes connected therewith. (Repealed by Trading with the Enemy Act 1939 (2 & 3 Geo. 6. c. 89))
Execution of Trusts (War Facilities) Act 1914 (repealed)	5 & 6 Geo. 5. c. 13	27 November 1914
An Act to facilitate the execution of Trusts during the present War. (Repealed by Statute Law Revision Act 1927 (17 & 18 Geo. 5. c. 42))
Poor Relief (Ireland) Act 1914 (repealed)	5 & 6 Geo. 5. c. 14	27 November 1914
An Act to authorise the modification or repeal of Section nine of the Poor Relief (Ireland) Act, 1847, (Note: Poor Relief (Ireland) Act 1847 (10 & 11 Vict. c. 31)) as respects certain Poor Law Unions in Ireland. (Repealed by Statute Law Revision Act 1927 (17 & 18 Geo. 5. c. 42), Welfare Services Act (Northern Ireland) 1949 (c. 1 (N.I.)) and Children and Young Persons Act (Northern Ireland) 1950 (c. 5 (N.I.)))
National Insurance (Navy and Army) Act 1914 (Session 2) (repealed)	5 & 6 Geo. 5. c. 15	27 November 1914
An Act to amend section forty-six of the National Health Insurance Act, 1911, (Note: National Insurance Act 1911 (1 & 2 Geo. 5. c. 55)) as respects the present War. (Repealed by Statute Law Revision Act 1927 (17 & 18 Geo. 5. c. 42))
Royal Marines Act 1914 (repealed)	5 & 6 Geo. 5. c. 16	27 November 1914
An Act to extend the term of service of the Royal Marine Force during the present War. (Repealed by Statute Law Revision Act 1927 (17 & 18 Geo. 5. c. 42))
Navy and Marines (Wills) Act 1914 (repealed)	5 & 6 Geo. 5. c. 17	27 November 1914
An Act to enable the Admiralty to dispense with compliance with the requirements of the Navy and Marines (Wills) Acts, 1865 (Note: Navy and Marines (Wills) Act 1865 (28 & 29 Vict. c. 72)) and 1897, (Note: Navy and Marines (Wills) Act 1897 (60 & 61 Vict. c. 15)) in the case of Seamen and Marines dying during or in consequence of the present War. (Repealed by Statute Law Revision Act 1927 (17 & 18 Geo. 5. c. 42))
Injuries in War Compensation Act 1914 (Session 2) (repealed)	5 & 6 Geo. 5. c. 18	27 November 1914
An Act to provide for the grant of Pensions and other Allowances to certain persons if disabled whilst employed abroad in connection with warlike operations, and to their dependants, and to amend the Injuries in War (Compensation) Act, 1914. (Note: Injuries in War (Compensation) Act 1914 (4 & 5 Geo. 5. c. 30)) (Repealed by Statute Law (Repeals) Act 2008 (c. 12))
Courts (Emergency Powers) (Ireland) Act 1914 (repealed)	5 & 6 Geo. 5. c. 19	27 November 1914
An Act to amend the Courts (Emergency Powers) Act, 1914, (Note: Courts (Emergency Powers) Act 1914 (4 & 5 Geo. 5. c. 78)) in its application to Ireland. (Repealed by Statute Law Revision Act 1927 (17 & 18 Geo. 5. c. 42))
Law Agents Apprenticeship (War Service) (Scotland) Act 1914 (repealed)	5 & 6 Geo. 5. c. 20	27 November 1914
An Act to enable apprentices to Law Agents in Scotland to reckon service in connection with the present war as service under an indenture of apprenticeship for the purposes of the Law Agents (Scotland) Act, 1873. (Note: Law Agents (Scotland) Act 1873 (36 & 37 Vict. c. 63)) (Repealed by Statute Law Revision Act 1927 (17 & 18 Geo. 5. c. 42))

=== Private and personal acts ===
Short title	Citation	Royal assent
Long title
Pack-Beresford's Divorce Act 1914 (Note: This act was not printed by the King's Printer)	5 & 6 Geo. 5. c. 1 Pr.	27 November 1914
An Act to dissolve the marriage of Henry John Pack-Beresford of Kellestown House in the county of Carlow Major with Sybil Maud Pack-Beresford his now wife and to enable him to marry again and for other purposes.

=== Sources ===
- 5 & 6 George V - 1914-6 – via HathiTrust.

== See also ==
- List of acts of the Parliament of the United Kingdom
