= Rotherham Power Station =

Former coal-fired power station

Prince of Wales Power Station
- Official name: Rotherham Power Station
- Country: England
- Location: South Yorkshire, Yorkshire and the Humber
- Coordinates: 53.435650°N 1.357222°W
- Status: Decommissioned and demolished
- Construction began: 1917
- Commission date: 1919
- Decommission date: 1978
- Owners: Rotherham Corporation (1891–1948); British Electricity Authority (1948–1955); Central Electricity Authority (1955–1957); Central Electricity Generating Board (1958–1978)
- Operator: As owner

Thermal power station
- Primary fuel: Coal
- Turbine technology: Steam turbines
- Cooling towers: 2
- Cooling source: River water and cooling tower

Power generation
- Units operational: 1 x 50 MW, 2 × 30 MW (1972)
- Make and model: BTH
- Units decommissioned: All

Rotherham power station (also known as Prince of Wales Power Station) was a coal-fired power station situated close to the centre of Rotherham in South Yorkshire.

== History ==
The electrical department of Rotherham Corporation established a generating station in Rotherham as early as 1891.

A new station was planned before the First World War but construction was delayed by the war. The first phase of the new station was commissioned in early 1919. The first two turbo-alternators were each 12.5 MW. In summer 1919 a 30 MW set was commissioned bringing the total capacity of the station to 70.5 MW (including the old plant). The turbines were supplied with steam from twelve water tube boilers. Demand for electricity was stimulated by the acquisition by Rotherham Corporation of the Mexborough and Swinton Tramways Company, together with industrial demand such as the new steel rolling mill plant which required 15,000 horsepower (11.03 MW).

The power station was officially opened by the Prince of Wales on 28 May 1923, when he started the station's British Thomson-Houston BTH 30 MW turbo-alternator. At that time the No.1 station comprised both AC and DC plant. The AC plant consisted of 2 × 1,000 kW and 2 × 5,500 kW steam turbine driven alternators. The DC plant comprised 1 × 500 kW turbo-alternator. The No.2 station comprised 2 × 12,500 kW and 1 × 30,000 kW turbo-alternators. The boilers in No.1 station had a capacity of 170,000 lb/hr (21.4 kg/s), and the No.2 station 600,000 lb/hr (75.6 kg/s). The station delivered 3-phase AC at 6,000 V, 3,000 V, 400 V and 230 V, the DC plant delivered 500, 460 and 230 V. In 1923 the station generated a total of 46.947 GWh. Sales of electricity amounted to 39.613 GWh generating a revenue of £208,715. There was a surplus of revenue over expenses of £129,968.

New generating equipment was added as the demand for electricity increased.

The generating plant comprised five Parsons turbo-alternators. These were two 25 MW (6.6 kV and 11 kV) sets installed in 1939 and 1940, one 30 MW (11 kV) set installed in 1942, one 50 MW (11 kV) set installed in 1949 and one 30 MW (11 kV) set installed in 1950.

There were 10 International Combustion Company 180,000 pounds per hour boilers operating at 625 psi. The boilers were travelling grate and spreader stoker types capable of delivering 1,800,000 lb/h (226.8 kg/s) of steam at 600 psi (41.4 bar) and 454 °C.

The electricity generating capacity and output of the power station is shown in the table.

Rotherham electricity capacity and output
Year	1946	1954	1955	1956	1957	1958	1961	1962	1963	1967	1971
Installed capacity, MW		150	150	150	150	150	160	160	160	160	160
Electricity output, GWh	510.0	792.251	658.724	649.984	604.526	497.920	658.132	458.427	504.153	663.379	182.226

By 1972 there were two 30 MW and one 50 MW turbo-alternators, with total installed capacity of 160 MW. Steam condensing and cooling was by river water and cooling towers, the Mitchell concrete cooling towers were each rated at 1.875 million gallons per hour . In the year ending 31 March 1972 the station delivered 383.002 GWh of electricity, its load factor (the average load as a per cent of maximum output capacity) was 29.1 per cent.

The station remained operational until 30 October 1978. It had a generating capacity of 56 MW.

Due to the proximity of the nearby buildings, the power station's cooling towers had to be demolished manually.

== See also ==
- Mexborough Power Station
- Templeborough Power Station
