= Thornhill power station =

- Country: England
- Location: Thornhill West Yorkshire
- Coordinates: 53°40′38″N 01°39′17″W
- Status: Steam station demolished; CCGT operational
- Construction began: 1901 (steam); 1996 (CCGT)
- Commission date: 1902 (steam); 1998 (CCGT)
- Decommission date: 1982 (steam);
- Owners: Yorkshire Electric Power Company (1900–1948); British Electricity Authority (1948–1955); Central Electricity Authority (1955–1957); Central Electricity Generating Board (1958–1982); E.ON UK Cogeneration Limited (1998–present)
- Operator: As owner

Thermal power station
- Primary fuel: Coal (steam); natural gas (CCGT)
- Turbine technology: Steam turbines (steam); gas turbine (CCGT)
- Cooling towers: 2 (steam station)
- Cooling source: River water plus cooling towers
- Cogeneration?: No

Power generation
- Units operational: 2 × 30 W, 3 × 45 MW (steam); 1 × 50 MW (CCGT)
- Make and model: British Thomson-Houston and English Electric
- Nameplate capacity: 186 MW (steam); 50 MW (CCGT)
- Annual net output: 695 GWh (1955)

The Thornhill power station generated and supplied electricity to the town of Dewsbury and the wider regional area from 1902 to 1982, and again from 1998. The first generating station on the site was owned and operated by the Yorkshire Electric Power Company. Following nationalisation of the British electricity supply industry in 1948 Thornhill power station was operated by a succession of state owned bodies. The power station was redeveloped with new plant in 1915, 1925, 1932–37 and 1950–54. The coal-fired steam station was decommissioned in 1982, and was subsequently demolished. A gas turbine power station on the site was commissioned in 1998.

== History ==
The Yorkshire Electric Power Company was established under the provisions of Yorkshire Electric Power Act 1901 (1 Edw. 7. c. cxvi). A power station was built at Thornhill (53°40′38″N 1°39′17″W) on a site adjacent to the River Calder. The river provided water for cooling and condensing steam. It was also adjacent to a railway line which facilitated the delivery of coal via the power station’s sidings. The station first generated electricity in 1902, and had a generating capacity of 4.5 MW. As demand for electricity increased so new plant was installed. In 1915 two 6 MW generating machines were added together with a new boiler house. Then in 1925 two 12.5 MW turbo-alternators were commissioned together with a third boiler house. Further boilers and two 30 MW turbo-alternators were commissioned in 1932–37. The final configuration of the steam station was achieved in 1950-54 with the addition of eight boilers and three 45 MW turbo-alternator sets. At the end of its operational life in 1982 Thornhill power station had a declared generating capacity of 135 MW.

The Yorkshire Electric Power Company also owned Barugh power station, Ferrybridge ‘A’ power station and Mexborough power station.

== Equipment specification ==
When it was first commissioned in 1902 the plant at Thornhill comprised:

- 4 × Babcock & Wilcox coal-fired water tube boilers, operating at 150 psi and 466 °F (10.3 bar and 241 °C) 20,000 lb/hr, these fed steam to:
- 3 × 1.5 MW British Thomson-Houston vertical turbo-alternators, generating current at 11 kV, 50 Hz.

The plant in 1923 comprised:

- Boilers delivering a total of 447,000 lb/h (56.3 kg/s) of steam to:
- Turbo-alternators:
  - 3 × 1,500 kW British Thomson-Houston turbo-alternators (installed 1902),
  - 1 × 3,000 kW turbo-alternator,
  - 2 × 6,000 kW British Thomson-Houston turbo-alternators (installed 1915).

New plant was installed in 1932–37, this comprised:

- 8 × Stirling 90,000 lb/h (11.33 kg/s) boilers operating at 450 psi and 780 °F (31.0 bar and 416 °C). With Bailey furnaces with International Combustion chain grate stokers, these supplied steam to:
- 2 × 30 MW English Electric turbo-alternators generating at 10.5 kV.

Under the British Electricity Authority new plant was installed in 1950–1954, this comprised:

- 8 × Mitchell 200,000 lb/h (25.2 kg/s) boilers operating at 450 psi and 885 °F (31.0 bar and 471 °C), with TG stokers, these supplied steam to:
- 3 × 45 MW English Electric turbo-alternators generating at 10.5 kV,

The plant installed in 1932–37 and 1950–54 represents the final configuration of Thornhill power station.

The total steam raising capability was 2,320,000 lb/h (292.3 kg/s).

The total installed generating capacity was 195 MW, and the output capacity was 186 MW.

Condensing water was drawn from the River Calder. There were two concrete cooling towers each with a capacity of 3 million gallons per hour (3.79 m^{3}/s).

Thornhill 132 kV substation, north of the power station site, is a major connecting site with 132kV lines to/from Wakefield, Huddersfield, Birkenshaw, Elland and Norristhorpe.

== Operations ==
=== Operating data 1921–23 ===
The operating data for the period 1921–23 is shown in the table:

Thornhill power station operating data 1921–23
Electricity Use	Units	Year		
Electricity Use	Units	1921	1922	1923
Power use	MWh	48.928	45.742	64.050
Bulk supply to other undertakings	MWh	7.810	9.065	14.015
Total use	MWh	56.738	54.807	78.065
Load and connected load
Maximum load	kW	20,230	21,704	28,092
Total connected load	kW	62,600	68,364	82,000
Load factor	Per cent	39.0	34.4	37.1
Financial
Revenue from sales of current	£	–	350,150	340,338
Surplus of revenue over expenses	£	–	125,813	161,916

The data shows that there was considerable growth in demand and use of electricity.

Under the terms of the Electricity (Supply) Act 1926 (16 & 17 Geo. 5. c. 51) the Central Electricity Board (CEB) was established in 1926. The CEB identified high efficiency ‘selected’ power stations that would supply electricity most effectively; Thornhill was designated a selected station. The CEB also constructed the national grid (1927–33) to connect power stations within a region, there is a 132 kV substation at Thornhill.

=== Operating data 1946 ===
Thornhill power station operating data, 1946 is given below.

Thornhill power station operating data, 1946
Year	Load factor per cent	Max output load MW	Electricity supplied GWh	Thermal efficiency per cent
1946	53.7	64,700	302.406	20.10

The British electricity supply industry was nationalised in 1948 under the provisions of the Electricity Act 1947 (10 & 11 Geo. 6. c. 54). The Yorkshire Electric Power Company was abolished, ownership of Thornhill power station was vested in the British Electricity Authority, and subsequently the Central Electricity Authority and the Central Electricity Generating Board (CEGB). At the same time the electricity distribution and sales responsibilities of the Yorkshire Electric Power Company were transferred to the Yorkshire Electricity Board (YEB).

=== Operating data 1954–82 ===
Operating data for the period 1954–82 is shown in the table:

Thornhill power station operating data, 1954–82
Year	Running hours or load factor (per cent)	Max output capacity MW	Electricity supplied GWh	Thermal efficiency per cent
1954	8191	143	568.150	22.54
1955	8488	186	695.040	23.10
1956	7799	186	587.180	22.90
1957	6699	186	465.334	22.67
1958	6154	186	483.273	22.69
1961	36.2%	186	589.703	21.56
1962	37.8%	186	615.139	20.59
1963	32.30%	186	526.339	20.72
1967	42.1 %	186	686.530	20.44
1972	31.1%	157	430.758	19.56
1979	17.6%	129	199.097	20.01
1982	–	129	3.396	–

Thornhill steam power station was decommissioned on 1 November 1982. It was subsequently demolished.

== Gas turbine station ==
Thornhill combined cycle gas turbine (CCGT) power station was commissioned in 1998. It is owned and operated by E.ON UK Cogeneration Limited. It comprises a single natural gas fired gas turbine with an associated heat recovery boiler, a single steam turbine, an electrical generator and a steam condensing and cooling system. The latter uses water from the River Calder in a once through cooling system which discharges back to the river. The exhaust gases are discharged to atmosphere through 30 m tall stack.

The station has a net thermal input of 106 MWth and provides an electrical output of 50 MWe in combined mode. It can also operate as an open cycle gas turbine (OCGT).

== See also ==
- Timeline of the UK electricity supply industry
- List of power stations in England
