= Yorkshire Electric Power Company =

- Type: Public Llmited company
- Industry: Energy: electricity generation and transmission
- Predecessor: Yorkshire Electric Power Syndicate Limited
- Founded: 26 July 1901
- Defunct: 31 March 1948
- Fate: Abolished by nationalisation
- Successor: British Electricity Authority
- Headquarters: Leeds, England
- Area served: West Yorkshire
- Production output: 1,176 GWh (1947)
- Services: Electricity generation and transmission
- Operating income: £1,137,771 (1947)

The Yorkshire Electric Power Company was founded in 1901 to provide a supply of electricity to commercial and industrial users throughout the West Riding of Yorkshire, England. It built and operated power stations and constructed overhead electric power lines across an area of 1,800 square miles (4662 km^{2}). The company’s power stations were at Thornhill, Barugh, Ferrybridge and Mexborough. The company promoted and stimulated demand for electric power and it was financially profitable for its shareholders.

The Yorkshire Electric Power Company was dissolved in 1948 when the British electricity supply industry was nationalised. Its power stations were vested in the British Electricity Authority and its electricity distribution and sales functions were taken over by the Yorkshire Electricity Board.

== History ==
Yorkshire Electric Power Act 1901 (Note: Section 1.)
- Act of Parliament
- Parliament of the United Kingdom
- Long title: An Act for incorporating and conferring powers on the Yorkshire Electric Power Company.
- Citation: 1 Edw. 7. c. cxvi
- Territorial extent: United Kingdom

Dates
- Royal assent: 26 July 1901 (Note: The Acts of Parliament (Commencement) Act 1793.)

Other legislation
- Amended by: Statute Law (Repeals) Act 1989

Status: Partially repealed

Yorkshire Electric Power Act 1910
- Act of Parliament
- Parliament of the United Kingdom
- Long title: An Act to confer further powers upon the Yorkshire Electric Power Company and for other purposes.
- Citation: 10 Edw. 7 & 1 Geo. 5. c. xxi
- Territorial extent: United Kingdom

Dates
- Royal assent: 26 July 1910
- Repealed: 16 November 1989

Other legislation
- Amended by: Yorkshire Electric Power Act 1927; Yorkshire Electric Power Act 1936
- Repealed by: Statute Law (Repeals) Act 1989

Status: Repealed

Yorkshire Electric Power Act 1914
- Act of Parliament
- Parliament of the United Kingdom
- Long title: An Act to confer further powers on the Yorkshire Electric Power Company.
- Citation: 4 & 5 Geo. 5. c. lxxxv
- Territorial extent: United Kingdom

Dates
- Royal assent: 31 July 1914
- Repealed: 16 November 1989

Other legislation
- Repealed by: Statute Law (Repeals) Act 1989

Status: Repealed

Text of statute as originally enacted

Yorkshire Electric Power Act 1918
- Act of Parliament
- Parliament of the United Kingdom
- Long title: An Act to confer further powers on the Yorkshire Electric Power Company and to make further provisions with respect to the supply of electrical energy in the area of that Company.
- Citation: 8 & 9 Geo. 5. c. viii
- Territorial extent: United Kingdom

Dates
- Royal assent: 27 June 1918
- Repealed: 16 November 1989

Other legislation
- Repealed by: Statute Law (Repeals) Act 1989

Status: Repealed

Text of statute as originally enacted

Yorkshire Electric Power Act 1922
- Act of Parliament
- Parliament of the United Kingdom
- Long title: An Act to confer further powers on the Yorkshire Electric Power Company.
- Citation: 12 & 13 Geo. 5. c. xxiii
- Territorial extent: United Kingdom

Dates
- Royal assent: 31 May 1922
- Repealed: 16 November 1989

Other legislation
- Repealed by: Statute Law (Repeals) Act 1989

Status: Repealed

Text of statute as originally enacted

Yorkshire Electric Power Act 1927
- Act of Parliament
- Parliament of the United Kingdom
- Long title: An Act to increase the capital and borrowing powers of the Yorkshire Electric Power Company to confer further powers on that company and for other purposes.
- Citation: 17 & 18 Geo. 5. c. xxv
- Territorial extent: United Kingdom

Dates
- Royal assent: 29 June 1927
- Repealed: 16 November 1989

Other legislation
- Amends: Yorkshire Electric Power Act 1910
- Repealed by: Statute Law (Repeals) Act 1989

Status: Repealed

Text of statute as originally enacted

Yorkshire Electric Power Act 1936
- Act of Parliament
- Parliament of the United Kingdom
- Long title: An Act to confer further powers upon the Yorkshire Electric Power Company and for other purposes.
- Citation: 26 Geo. 5 & 1 Edw. 8. c. xxxi
- Territorial extent: United Kingdom

Dates
- Royal assent: 21 May 1936
- Repealed: 16 November 1989

Other legislation
- Amends: Yorkshire Electric Power Act 1910
- Repealed by: Statute Law (Repeals) Act 1989

Status: Repealed

Text of statute as originally enacted

In the late 1890s a group of large and influential manufacturing firms in West Yorkshire wished to promote an electric power company to provide a cheap and abundant supply of electricity. Sixty-three shareholders formed the Yorkshire Electric Power Syndicate Limited. In association with the promoters of the South Yorkshire Electric Power Bill they sought to obtain a local act of Parliament to give them the necessary legal powers. In 1901 Parliament passed the Yorkshire Electric Power Act 1901 (1 Edw. 7. c. cxvi). The Yorkshire Electric Power Company was incorporated on 26 July 1901 under the provisions of the act. Its function was to construct electricity generating stations and power lines to provide a supply of electricity throughout (initially) an area of 1,800 square miles (4662 km^{2}) in the West Riding of Yorkshire. Its initial capital was £2,000,000 comprising 200,000 shares of £10.

As a power company it could only provide electricity for lighting where a supply for power was also provided. To allow it to supply electricity for any purpose, including lighting alone, the company established a subsidiary organisation: Electrical Distribution of Yorkshire Limited in 1905.

Further legal powers were obtained in 1910, 1914, 1918, 1922 and 1927.

== Management ==
The inaugural Board of Directors included several industrialists associated with the iron and steel, electrical, and transport industries in Yorkshire. The board comprised:

- Arthur Greenhow Lupton (chairman)
- Robert Armitage
- Arthur Currer Briggs
- Hardman Arthur Earle (managing director)
- Henry Cawood Embleton
- William Paul James Fawcus
- Robert Hudson
- Sir Richard Mottram
- Thomas Octavius Callender
- Edgar Alfred Carolan

The company secretary was James Milnes and the company's registered office was at 4 South Parade Leeds.

== Power stations ==
The 1901 act prescribed four power stations to be built by the company, these were at Mirfield, Methley, Wath and Bingley. Three of the sites were adjacent to coal mines which would provide fuel for the stations. All four stations would have access to a plentiful supply of water for condensing steam and providing cooling. The centre of the company’s area of supply was at Mirfield where the first power station was to be built. The power stations built by the Yorkshire Electric Power Company would outlast the company itself and continue to be used after nationalisation in 1948.

Under the terms of the Electricity (Supply) Act 1926 (16 & 17 Geo. 5. c. 51) the Central Electricity Board (CEB) was established in 1926. The CEB identified high efficiency ‘selected’ power stations that would supply electricity most effectively; Thornhill and Barugh were designated as selected stations.

=== Thornhill power station ===
Instead of Mirfield a site at Thornhill 2 miles (3 km) to the east was chosen. Thornhill power station was commissioned as a 4.5 MW station in 1902. It was extended in 1915, 1925 and 1932–37 when it had a capacity of 75 MW. The station was further extended by the British Electricity Authority in 1950–54 and operated until 1982. As of 2020, the site was occupied by a gas turbine power plant.

=== Ferrybridge power station ===
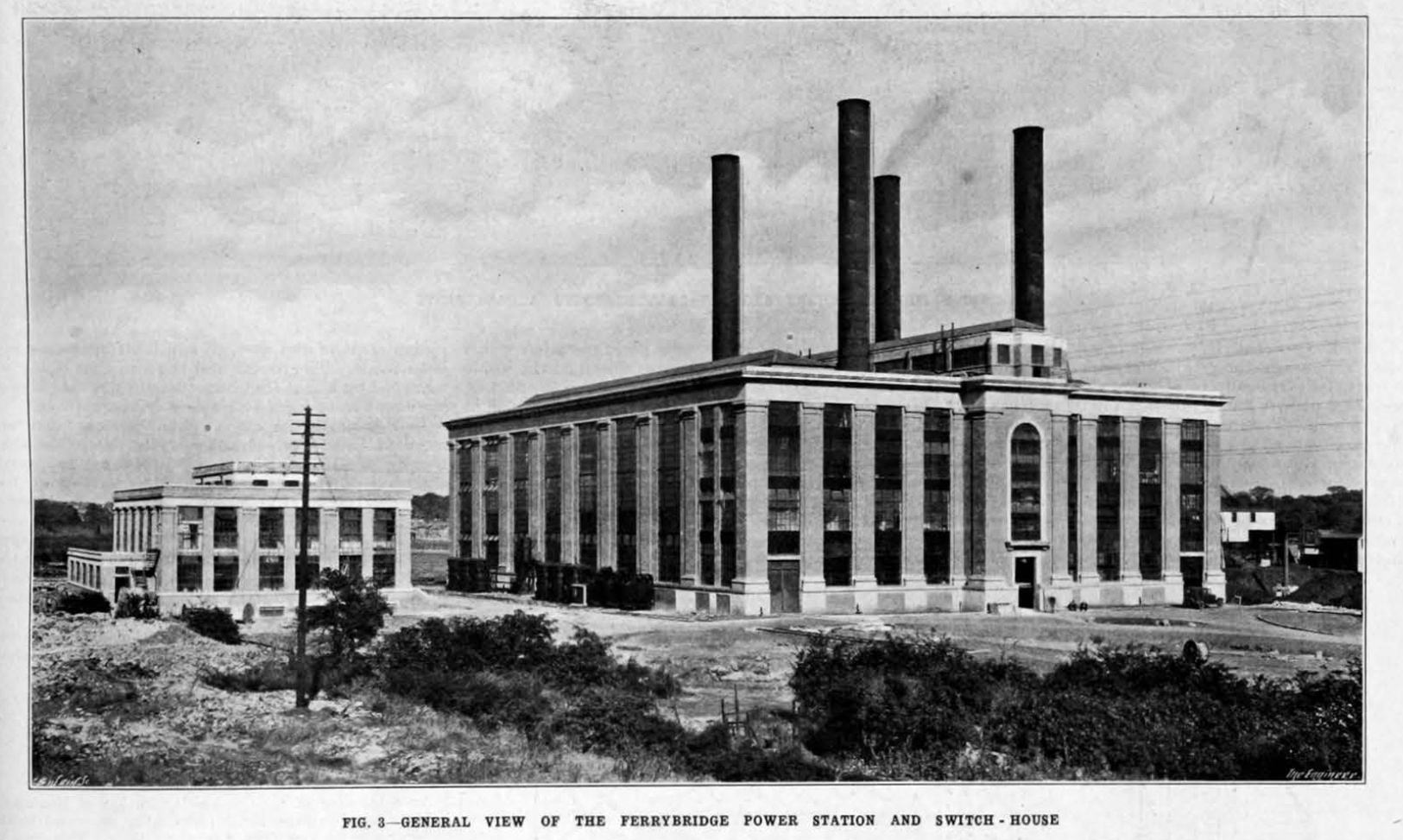
View of Ferrybridge A main building in 1927

Ferrybridge power station, later known as Ferrybridge A, was constructed in 1926–27. It was closed in 1976. Following nationalisation Ferrybridge B (1957–92) and Ferrybridge C (1966–2016) were subsequently constructed. The site is now (2020) occupied by Ferrybridge Multifuel power station.

=== Mexborough power station ===
The company had planned to build Mexborough power station from 1939 but this was delayed by the war and construction started in 1943. It was commissioned in 1945 and had a capacity of 120 MW. It closed in 1981.

=== Barugh power station ===
Barugh power station near Barnsley (53°34′24″N 1°31′09″W) was commissioned in 1913. It was fuelled by gas from the coke ovens of Old Silkstone colliery. This was used to raise steam at a rate of 150,000 lb/h (18.9 kg/s) which was used to drive two 2.0 MW and two 5.0 MW steam turbines coupled to generators giving a total output of 14 MW AC.

Condensing water was circulated through cooling ponds adjacent to the station. Operating data for the station just prior to nationalisation is given in the table.

Barugh power station operating data, 1946
Year	Load factor, per cent	Max output load, kW	Electricity supplied, GWh	Thermal efficiency, per cent
1946	13.8	9910	11.982	8.88

The steam set was shut down in 1958.

Following nationalisation Diesel engines were installed by the British Electricity Authority in December 1954. There were two 2.0 MW Mirlees, Bickerton and Day engines, the alternators operated at 11 kV. Operating data for the station is shown in the table.

Barugh power station operating data, 1955–63
Year	Running hours	Capacity, MW	Electricity sent out, MWh	Load factor, per cent
1955	381	4.0	958	62.9
1956	2940	4.0	7682	65.3
1957	2473	4.0	7766	78.5
1958	2316	4.0	7311	78.9
1961	–	2.0	–	–
1963	–	2.0	–	–

Barugh power station was decommissioned in 1963.

The electricity substation at Barugh is still (2020) operational and has connections for 132 kV and 66 kV lines.

== Electricity distribution ==
In 1927 Yorkshire Electric Power Company awarded a contract to Transmission Lines and Cables Construction Company of Keighley to build the Ferrybridge-Beal-Snaith 33 kV overhead line. The masts and towers were a combination of 'H' girder steel masts, lattice steel masts, lattice steel angle masts and lattice steel angle towers. They were designed and supplied by W. T. Henley (Henley Overhead Transmission).

The Central Electricity Board (CEB) constructed the national grid (1927–33) to connect power stations within a region, there is a 132 kV substation at Thornhill, and one at Barugh.

The construction of the national grid in the mid-east England area was completed in 1932. The system comprised 16 power stations (including new stations at Kirkstall and Ferrybridge) interconnected by 322 miles (518 km) of 132 kV transmission lines. A secondary system was established in South Lincolnshire and Rutland to provide electricity to rural areas, this used 202 miles (325 km) of 33 kV lines.

In 1932 the Yorkshire Electric Power Company registered the North Lincolnshire and Howdenshire Electricity Company as a subsidiary to supply electricity in an area adjacent to its existing supply area.

In 1933 the company was responsible for 2,100 miles (3380 km) of mains, 775 substations and 214 pole transformers.

== Operations ==
Although the company’s remit was to supply electricity over a wide area of West Yorkshire, its presence was not welcome by some municipalities. Some were unenthusiastic about providing a supply to the power company and councillors objected to using ratepayer’s money to supply electricity outside their municipal boundaries. Others objected to power companies supplying outside a local authority area which might prevent future expansion beyond current municipal boundaries. In Yorkshire, Leeds and other large municipalities opposed initiatives by the Yorkshire Electric Power Company to supply districts outside their boundaries.

The company actively promoted the use of electricity by domestic, commercial and industrial consumers.

The Electricity Commissioners were established in 1919 to define electricity districts and promote the establishment of Joint Electricity Authorities (JEA). The Yorkshire Electric Power Company saw the establishment of a Yorkshire JEA as an attempt to usurp the function of bulk supply for which it had been established. Several Yorkshire municipalities also opposed the JEA proposal and it was not developed any further.

In 1923 Thornhill and Barugh power stations were both operational and supplying the company’s electricity requirements. The quantities of electric power sold and the associated income is shown on the table.

Yorkshire Electric Power Company operational data 1921–23
Year	Electricity sold, GWh		Income from sales, £		Surplus of income over expenses, £	Maximum load, kW
Year	Power users	Bulk supply	Power users	Bulk supply	Surplus of income over expenses, £	Maximum load, kW
1921	48.928	7.810	–	–	–	20,230
1922	45.742	9.065	296,786	53,364	125,813	21,704
1923	64.050	14.015	286,294	54,044	161,916	28.092

Power companies became the management and financial centres for the development of the commercial sector. By 1932 the Yorkshire Electric Power Company held 51 distribution franchises over a much wider area than originally established. This included parts of Derbyshire and Lincolnshire. By 1935 its supply area was 2,481 square miles (6426 km^{2}). There were 1,411 miles (2271 km) of mains providing electricity supplies to local authorities, electrical undertakers, textile mills, collieries, steel works, docks and other power users.

In 1945 the company's four power stations sold a combined quantity of 860 GWh, this increased to 1,095 GWh (1946) and 1,176 GWh (1947).

Operational data for the four power stations of the Yorkshire Electric Power Company in 1946 are given in the table.

Yorkshire Electric Power Company operational data 1946
Power station	Electricity sent out, GWh	Thermal efficiency, %	Maximum load sent out, kW	Load factor, %
Barugh	11.982	8.88	9,910	13.8
Ferrybridge	468.152	22.44	104,200	51.3
Mexborough	315.725	24.88	59,900	60.2
Thornhill	302.406	20.10	64,700	53.7

The four power stations continued to operate following nationalisation, when they were owned and operated by the British Electricity Authority.

== Financial ==
The profits of the company from 1912 to 1947 are shown in the table.

Yorkshire Electric Power Company profits 1912–47
Profit quoted after interest and dividends deducted
Year	1912	1913	1914	1915	1916	1917	1918	1919
Profit £	2,235	8,544	11,163	11,193	19,704	22,765	35,412	42,731
Profit quoted after interest
Year	1914	1915	1916	1917	1918	1919	1920	1921
Profit £	20,534	21,209	29,112	33,258	46,535	54,133	64,739	74,316
Profit after tax but before interest deducted
Year	1927	1928	1929	1930	1931	1932	1933	1934
Profit £	336,093	346,462	368,653	370,235	384,362	403,791	469,532	476,540
Year	1946	1947						
Profit £	812,670	1,137,771						

== Nationalisation ==
The British electricity supply industry was nationalised in 1948, as part of the post-war Labour government’s plans to bring the UK's industrial infrastructure within state control. Nationalisation was enacted under the provisions of the Electricity Act 1947 (10 & 11 Geo. 6. c. 54). The Yorkshire Electric Power Company was abolished on 31 March 1948. Ownership of Thornhill, Barugh, Ferrybridge and Mexborough power stations was vested in the British Electricity Authority, and subsequently the Central Electricity Authority (1954–57) and the Central Electricity Generating Board (from 1958). At the same time the electricity distribution and sales responsibilities of the Yorkshire Electric Power Company were transferred to the Yorkshire Electricity Board (YEB).

== See also ==
- Thornhill power station
- Ferrybridge power station
- Mexborough power station
- London Power Company
- National grid
