= Crown Lands Act 1702 =

Act of the Parliament of England

Crown Lands Act 1702 (Note: The citation of this act by this short title was authorised by section 1 of, and the first schedule to, the Short Titles Act 1896. Due to the repeal of those provisions it is now authorised by section 19(2) of the Interpretation Act 1978.)
- Act of Parliament
- Parliament of England
- Long title: An Act for the better Support of Her Majesties Houshold and of the Honour and Dignity of the Crown.
- Citation: 1 Ann. c. 1 (Note: This is the citation in The Statutes of the Realm.); 1 Ann. St. 1. c. 7 (Note: This is the citation in The Statutes at Large.)
- Territorial extent: England and Wales

Dates
- Royal assent: 30 March 1702
- Commencement: 9 March 1702 (Note: Section 1.)
Other legislation
Amended by	Duchy of Lancaster Act 1779; Crown Private Estates Act 1862; Statute Law Revision Act 1867; Short Titles Act 1896; Duchy of Lancaster Act 1920; Statute Law Revision Act 1948; Crown Estate Act 1961; Post Office Act 1969; Crown Agents Act 1979; Duchy of Lancaster Act 1988; Land at Palace Avenue, Kensington (Acquisition of Freehold) Act 2002; Kew Gardens (Leases) Act 2019

Status: Amended

Text of statute as originally enacted

Revised text of statute as amended

Text of the Crown Lands Act 1702 as in force today (including any amendments) within the United Kingdom, from legislation.gov.uk.

The Crown Lands Act 1702 (1 Ann. c. 1) is an act of the Parliament of England, originally entitled An Act for the better Support of Her Majesties Houshold and of the Honour and Dignity of the Crown.

== Provisions ==
The act allowed the monarch to only receive the income from the Duchy of Lancaster and not the capital. The legislation has been amended, so that the Duchy has been removed from the legislation.

As of 2026, the act is still partly in force in England and Wales.

== Subsequent developments ==
Sections 1–4 of the act were repealed by section 1 of, and the schedule to, the Statute Law Revision Act 1867 (30 & 31 Vict. c. 59), which came into force on 15 July 1867.

Sections 6 and 8 of the act were repealed by section 1 of, and the first schedule to, the Statute Law Revision Act 1948 (11 & 12 Geo. 6. c. 62), which came into force on 30 July 1948.

The whole act was repealed for the Republic of Ireland by sections 2(1) and 3(1) of, and part 4 of schedule 2 to, the Statute Law Revision Act 2007, which came into force on 8 May 2007.

The Land at Palace Avenue, Kensington (Acquisition of Freehold) Act 2002 amended the legislation so that land at Kensington Palace could be sold off.

== See also ==
- Crown Lands Act
- Halsbury's Statutes
