= Duchy of Lancaster Act 1787 =

Act of the Parliament of Great Britain

Duchy of Lancaster Act 1787 (Note: The citation of this act by this short title was authorised by section 5 of, and the second schedule to, the Statute Law Revision Act 1948. Due to the repeal of those provisions, it is now authorised by section 19(2) of the Interpretation Act 1978.)
- Act of Parliament
- Parliament of Great Britain
- Long title: An Act to amend an Act, passed in the Nineteenth Year of the Reign of His present Majesty, intituled, An Act to enable the Chancellor and Council of the Duchy of Lancaster to sell and dispose of certain Fee-farm Rents, and other Rents, and to enfranchise Copyhold and Customary Tenements within their Survey; and to encourage the Growth of Timber on Lands held of the said Duchy; and to enable the said Chancellor and Council to discharge Incumbrances affecting the Possessions of the said Duchy.
- Citation: 27 Geo. 3. c. 34
- Territorial extent: Great Britain

Dates
- Royal assent: 28 May 1787
- Commencement: 23 January 1787 (Note: Start of session.)

Other legislation
- Amends: Duchy of Lancaster Act 1779
- Amended by: Decimal Currency Act 1969; Statute Law (Repeals) Act 1989

Status: Amended

Text of statute as originally enacted

Revised text of statute as amended

Text of the Duchy of Lancaster Act 1787 as in force today (including any amendments) within the United Kingdom, from legislation.gov.uk.

The Duchy of Lancaster Act 1787 (27 Geo. 3. c. 34) is an act of the Parliament of Great Britain.

As of 2026, the act was partly in force in Great Britain.

== Subsequent developments ==
Section 10(1) of the Decimal Currency Act 1969 provided that references in section 2 of the act to an amount of money in the old currency which are not a whole number of pounds must, in so far as they refer to an amount in shillings or pence, be read as referring to the equivalent of that amount in the new currency.

The words "after deducting the land tax chargeable thereon" in section 2 of the act, and section 3 of the act, were repealed by section 1(1) of, and groups 1 of part II and group 3 of part VII of schedule 1 to, the Statute Law (Repeals) Act 1989, which came into force on 16 November 1989.
