= Kew Gardens (Leases) Act 2019 =

United Kingdom law

- Act of Parliament
- Parliament of the United Kingdom
- Long title: An Act to provide that the Secretary of State’s powers in relation to the management of the Royal Botanic Gardens, Kew, include the power to grant a lease in respect of land for a period of up to 150 years.
- Citation: 2019 c. 25
- Introduced by: Michael Gove, Secretary of State for Environment, Food and Rural Affairs (Commons); Lord Gardiner of Kimble, Parliamentary Under-Secretary of State for Rural Affairs and Biosecurity (Lords)
- Territorial extent: England and Wales

Dates
- Royal assent: 9 September 2019
- Commencement: 9 November 2019

Other legislation
- Amends: Crown Lands Act 1702

Status: Current legislation

History of passage through Parliament

Text of statute as originally enacted

Text of the Kew Gardens (Leases) Act 2019 as in force today (including any amendments) within the United Kingdom, from legislation.gov.uk.

The Kew Gardens (Leases) Act 2019 (c. 25) is an act of the Parliament of the United Kingdom. It allowed the Secretary of State to lease land on the grounds of the Royal Botanic Gardens, Kew. It was introduced to Parliament by Lord Gardiner of Kimble and Michael Gove from the Department for Environment, Food and Rural Affairs as a government bill.

== Legislative passage ==
The act was passed under the English votes for English laws procedure.

== Provisions ==
The provisions of the act include:

- Allowing the Secretary of State the power to grant leases on land on the grounds of Kew Gardens for a period up to 150 years. This increased the previous 31 year limit on such leases.
- Exempting such a lease from Section 5 of the Crown Lands Act 1702 (which limits the grants and leases of land owned by the Crown).
- Preventing such a lease if it would have an adverse impact on either the "outstanding universal value" of the Gardens as a World Heritage Site or if it would impair the work of the Board of Trustees of the Gardens to carry out their functions and that of the Gardens under Section 24 of the National Heritage Act 1983 (which directs the Board to carry out research into, education about, care of and collect reference archives about plants).

== See also ==
- Kew Gardens
- Non-departmental public body – the official designation of the Royal Botanic Gardens, Kew
