= Statute Law (Repeals) Act 1989 =

Act of the Parliament of the United Kingdom

Statute Law (Repeals) Act 1989 (Note: Section 3(1).)
- Act of Parliament
- Parliament of the United Kingdom
- Long title: An Act to promote the reform of the statute law by the repeal, in accordance with recommendations of the Law Commission and the Scottish Law Commission, of certain enactments which (except in so far as their effect is preserved) are no longer of practical utility, and to make other provision in connection with the repeal of those enactments.
- Citation: 1989 c. 43
- Introduced by: Lord Mackay of Clashfern LC (Lords)
- Territorial extent: United Kingdom; Isle of Man; (Note: Section 2.)

Dates
- Royal assent: 16 November 1989
- Commencement: 16 November 1989, (Note: The Interpretation Act 1978, section 4(b).) except that the repeal by this act of section 3 of the Federation of Malaya Independence Act 1957 and of section 5 of the Malaysia Act 1963 came into force on 1 June 1992.
Other legislation
Amends	City of London Municipal Elections Act 1849; Capital Punishment Amendment Act 1868; Metropolitan Public Carriage Act 1869; Irish Free State (Consequential Provisions) Act 1922 (Session 2); Compensation (Defence) Act 1939; Building Restrictions (War-Time Contraventions) Act 1946; Foreign Compensation Act 1950; Development of Inventions Act 1967; District Courts (Scotland) Act 1975; Justices of the Peace Act 1979; Highways Act 1980; Senior Courts Act 1981; See § Repealed enactments
Repeals/revokes	See § Repealed enactments
Amended by	British Technology Group Act 1991; Justices of the Peace Act 1997; Greater London Authority Act 1999; Courts Act 2003
Relates to	See Statute Law (Repeals) Act

Status: Amended

Text of statute as originally enacted

The Statute Law (Repeals) Act 1989 (c. 43) is an act of the Parliament of the United Kingdom, which was partly in force in Great Britain at the end of 2010.

== Background ==
The act implemented recommendations contained in the thirteenth report on statute law revision, by the Law Commission and the Scottish Law Commission.

== Provisions ==
The Statute Law (Repeals) Act 1989 (Commencement) Order 1992 (SI 1992/1275) was made under section 3(2) of the act.

=== Repealed enactments ===
Section 1(1) of the act repealed 541 enactments, listed in parts I to XI of schedule 1 to the act.

==== Part I: Administration of Justice ====
Part I — Administration of Justice
Citation	Short title	Extent of repeal
Group 1 - Bankruptcy Acts 1883, 1890 and 1913
12 & 13 Vict. c. xciv	City of London Municipal Elections Act 1849	In section 9, the words “shall declare himself or shall be declared bankrupt or insolvent, or”.
46 & 47 Vict. c. 52	Bankruptcy Act 1883	The whole act.
53 & 54 Vict. c. 71	Bankruptcy Act 1890	The whole act.
3 & 4 Geo. 5. c. 34	Bankruptcy and Deeds of Arrangement Act 1913	The whole act.
1985 c. 66	Bankruptcy (Scotland) Act 1985	In Schedule 7, paragraph 2.
Group 2 - Police Acts
2 & 3 Vict. c. 47	Metropolitan Police Act 1839	Sections 13 and 29.
2 & 3 Vict. c. 47	Metropolitan Police Act 1839	Section 61 from “and the owner” onwards.
2 & 3 Vict. c. 47	Metropolitan Police Act 1839	Sections 62, 69, 73 and 77.
2 & 3 Vict. c. 47	Metropolitan Police Act 1839	Section 78 from “and all” onwards.
2 & 3 Vict. c. xciv	City of London Police Act 1839	Sections 18, 20, 21, 23, 26 and 27.
2 & 3 Vict. c. xciv	City of London Police Act 1839	In section 28, the proviso.
2 & 3 Vict. c. xciv	City of London Police Act 1839	Section 29.
2 & 3 Vict. c. xciv	City of London Police Act 1839	In section 31, the words “take into custody” and “and every person so found”.
2 & 3 Vict. c. xciv	City of London Police Act 1839	Section 34.
2 & 3 Vict. c. xciv	City of London Police Act 1839	In section 35 — (a) paragraph 9 from “during” to “service, and”; (b) paragraph 10 from “or wilfully break” onwards; (c) in paragraph 12, the words “indecent or obscene”, where first occurring, and from “or write” to “representation”; (d) paragraph 14 from “(except” to “duty)”; (e) the words from “And it shall be lawful” onwards.
2 & 3 Vict. c. xciv	City of London Police Act 1839	Sections 38 and 39.
2 & 3 Vict. c. xciv	City of London Police Act 1839	Section 42 from “and the owner” onwards.
2 & 3 Vict. c. xciv	City of London Police Act 1839	Sections 43 to 48.
2 & 3 Vict. c. xciv	City of London Police Act 1839	Sections 50 to 54.
2 & 3 Vict. c. xciv	City of London Police Act 1839	Sections 97 to 103.
10 & 11 Vict. c. 89	Town Police Clauses Act 1847	The following provisions as they apply to England and Wales.
10 & 11 Vict. c. 89	Town Police Clauses Act 1847	Sections 15 and 30.
10 & 11 Vict. c. 89	Town Police Clauses Act 1847	In section 36, the words “take into custody” and “and every person so found”.
10 & 11 Vict. c. 89	Town Police Clauses Act 1847	In sections 61 and 65, the words from “and in default” onwards.
10 & 11 Vict. c. 89	Town Police Clauses Act 1847	Section 75.
49 & 50 Vict. c. 22	Metropolitan Police Act 1886	Section 1 from “This Act and” onwards.
49 & 50 Vict. c. 22	Metropolitan Police Act 1886	Schedule 1.
60 & 61 Vict. c. 30	Police (Property) Act 1897	Section 1(1) from “or under section sixty-six” to “London”.
60 & 61 Vict. c. 30	Police (Property) Act 1897	Section 1(3).
62 & 63 Vict. c. 26	Metropolitan Police Act 1899	Section 1(2) from “either” to “Parliament, or” and from “or apportioned” to the end of the subsection.
4 & 5 Geo. 5. c. 34	Police Reservists (Allowances) Act 1914	The whole act.
5 & 6 Geo. 5. c. 32	Irish Police (Naval and Military Service) Act 1915	Section 1(1).
1964 c. 48	Police Act 1964	In Schedule 9, the entries relating to the Metropolitan Police Act 1839, the City of London Police Act 1839, the Town Police Clauses Act 1847, the National Insurance (Industrial Injuries) Act 1946, the Homicide Act 1957 and the Road Traffic and Roads Improvement Act 1960.
1976 c. 63	Bail Act 1976	In Schedule 2, paragraph 2.
Group 3 - Scottish Courts, &c.
6 Geo. 4. c. 86	Courts of Justice (Scotland) Act 1825	The whole act.
9 Geo. 4. c. 29	Circuit Courts (Scotland) Act 1828	Sections 6 and 16.
9 Geo. 4. c. 29	Circuit Courts (Scotland) Act 1828	Schedules A and C.
11 Geo. 4 & 1 Will. 4. c. 37	Criminal Law (Scotland) Act 1830	Sections 9, 11 and 14.
11 & 12 Vict. c. 79	Justiciary (Scotland) Act 1848	The whole act.
31 & 32 Vict. c. 95	Justiciary Court (Scotland) Act 1868	The whole act.
50 & 51 Vict. c. 35	Criminal Procedure (Scotland) Act 1887	Section 46.
55 & 56 Vict. c. 21	High Court of Justiciary (Scotland) Act 1892	The whole act.
7 Edw. 7. c. 51	Sheriff Courts (Scotland) Act 1907	Section 3(m).
17 & 18 Geo. 5. c. 35	Sheriff Courts and Legal Officers (Scotland) Act 1927	Section 7.
3 & 4 Geo. 6. c. 15	Solicitors (Emergency Provisions) Act 1940	The whole act.
12, 13 & 14 Geo. 6. c. 63	Legal Aid and Solicitors (Scotland) Act 1949	The whole act.
2 & 3 Eliz. 2. c. 48	Summary Jurisdiction (Scotland) Act 1954	Section 74.
1972 c. 11	Superannuation Act 1972	In Schedule 6, paragraph 11.
1976 c. 6	Solicitors (Scotland) Act 1976	The whole act.
1976 c. 14	Fatal Accidents and Sudden Deaths Inquiry (Scotland) Act 1976	Section 10(2), (3) and (5).
1980 c. 55	Law Reform (Miscellaneous Provisions) (Scotland) Act 1980	Section 11(1) from “and accordingly” onwards; and section 11(2).
1980 c. 55	Law Reform (Miscellaneous Provisions) (Scotland) Act 1980	Section 28(2).
1980 c. 55	Law Reform (Miscellaneous Provisions) (Scotland) Act 1980	Schedule 3.
Group 4 - Vagrancy Law
5 Geo. 4. c. 83	Vagrancy Act 1824	The following provisions as they apply to England and Wales.
5 Geo. 4. c. 83	Vagrancy Act 1824	Section 3 from the beginning to “manner; and”.
5 Geo. 4. c. 83	Vagrancy Act 1824	Section 4 from “every person pretending” to “subjects;”
5 Geo. 4. c. 83	Vagrancy Act 1824	Section 5 from the beginning to “by virtue of this Act;” and from “and every person apprehended” to “so apprehended”.
5 Geo. 4. c. 83	Vagrancy Act 1824	In section 10, the words “in the house of correction”.
5 Geo. 4. c. 83	Vagrancy Act 1824	In section 22, the words “Provided also, that” and from “ nor to alter ” (where first occurring) onwards.
6 Geo. 4. c. 97	Universities Act 1825	Section 3.
34 & 35 Vict. c. 96	Pedlars Act 1871	Section 13 as it applies to England and Wales.
57 & 58 Vict. c. lx	Cambridge University and Corporation Act 1894	Section 6.
Group 5 - General Repeals
11 Geo. 2. c. 19	Distress for Rent Act 1737	Section 14.
60 Geo. 3 & 1 Geo. 4. c. 1	Unlawful Drilling Act 1819	Section 4.
1 & 2 Will. 4. c. 32	Game Act 1831	In sections 3, 4, 12, 23, 24, 25, 27, 28, 30, 31 and 32, as they apply to England and Wales or Northern Ireland, the words “together with the costs of the conviction”.
1 & 2 Will. 4. c. 32	Game Act 1831	Section 38.
8 & 9 Vict. c. 124	Leases Act 1845	The whole Act, but without prejudice to any existing lease.
11 & 12 Vict. c. 42	Indictable Offences Act 1848	Section 32 from the beginning to “Act, but”.
14 & 15 Vict. c. 19	Prevention of Offences Act 1851	The whole act.
24 & 25 Vict. c. 100	Offences against the Person Act 1861	Sections 39, 40 and 76, as they apply to England and Wales.
25 & 26 Vict. c. 14	Crown Suits (Isle of Man) Act 1862	The whole act.
27 & 28 Vict. c. 24	Naval Agency and Distribution Act 1864	In section 2, the definition of “the High Court of Admiralty”.
31 & 32 Vict. c. 37	Documentary Evidence Act 1868	In the Schedule, the entry relating to the Poor Law Board.
32 & 33 Vict. c. 62	Debtors Act 1869	Sections 18 and 23.
38 & 39 Vict. c. 86	Conspiracy and Protection of Property Act 1875	Sections 10, 11, 13, 19 and 20.
46 & 47 Vict. c. 3	Explosive Substances Act 1883	Section 7(4).
46 & 47 Vict. c. 38	Trial of Lunatics Act 1883	Section 4.
50 & 51 Vict. c. 53	Escheat (Procedure) Act 1887	The whole act.
9 & 10 Geo. 5. c. 71	Sex Disqualification (Removal) Act 1919	Section 1 from “Provided that” onwards.
9 & 10 Geo. 5. c. 71	Sex Disqualification (Removal) Act 1919	Section 2 as it applies to Scotland.
13 & 14 Geo. 5 c. 9 (N.I.)	Criminal Evidence Act (Northern Ireland) 1923	Section 5(1) from “except” onwards.
15 & 16 Geo. 5. c. 28	Administration of Justice Act 1925	Section 22(3).
15 & 16 Geo. 5. c. 28	Administration of Justice Act 1925	Section 22(4) from the beginning to “section, and” and the word “other” wherever occurring.
25 & 26 Geo. 5. c. 25	Counterfeit Currency (Convention) Act 1935	The whole act.
12, 13 & 14 Geo. 6. c. 101	Justices of the Peace Act 1949	Sections 41, 43 and 45.
12, 13 & 14 Geo. 6. c. 101	Justices of the Peace Act 1949	Section 46(3) from “except” onwards.
12, 13 & 14 Geo. 6. c. 101	Justices of the Peace Act 1949	Schedule 7.
14 & 15 Geo. 6. c. 65	Reserve and Auxiliary Forces (Protection of Civil Interests) Act 1951	The following provisions except as they extend to Northern Ireland.
14 & 15 Geo. 6. c. 65	Reserve and Auxiliary Forces (Protection of Civil Interests) Act 1951	In section 27(1), the proviso from “or if” onwards.
14 & 15 Geo. 6. c. 65	Reserve and Auxiliary Forces (Protection of Civil Interests) Act 1951	Section 38(6)(b) and the preceding “or”.
14 & 15 Geo. 6. c. 65	Reserve and Auxiliary Forces (Protection of Civil Interests) Act 1951	Section 46(4).
14 & 15 Geo. 6. c. 65	Reserve and Auxiliary Forces (Protection of Civil Interests) Act 1951	Section 53.
14 & 15 Geo. 6. c. 65	Reserve and Auxiliary Forces (Protection of Civil Interests) Act 1951	In Part I of Schedule 2— (a) in paragraph 6, the words “other than the metropolitan police court area” and “such”; (b) paragraphs 18 and 19.
14 & 15 Geo. 6. c. 65	Reserve and Auxiliary Forces (Protection of Civil Interests) Act 1951	In Part II of Schedule 2— (a) in paragraph 3, the words “a standing joint committee or” and in column 2 the words “committee or”; (b) paragraphs 4(a), 5(a) and 6(a).
6 & 7 Eliz. 2. c. 51	Public Records Act 1958	In Schedule 2, the entries relating to the Import Duties Act 1932, the Defence (General) Regulations 1939 and the Legal Aid and Solicitors (Scotland) Act 1949.
7 & 8 Eliz. 2. c. 57	Street Offences Act 1959	Section 1(5).
7 & 8 Eliz. 2. c. 65	Fatal Accidents Act 1959	The whole act.
8 & 9 Eliz. 2. c. 9	Judicial Pensions Act 1959	Section 3.
1968 c. 69	Justices of the Peace Act 1968	In Schedule 3, paragraphs 1 and 6.
1970 c. 31	Administration of Justice Act 1970	Section 30.
1970 c. 31	Administration of Justice Act 1970	In Schedule 4, paragraph 2.
1971 c. 32	Attachment of Earnings Act 1971	In Schedule 2, paragraph 2.
1973 c. 15	Administration of Justice Act 1973	Sections 19 and 20.
1973 c. 15	Administration of Justice Act 1973	Schedule 5.
1974 c. 47	Solicitors Act 1974	Section 75(a).
1980 c. 43	Magistrates' Courts Act 1980	In Schedule 1, paragraphs 15, 21 and 24.
1981 c. 54	Supreme Court Act 1981	Section 11(10).
1981 c. 54	Supreme Court Act 1981	Section 89(5), (6) and (7).
1981 c. 54	Supreme Court Act 1981	In Schedule 6, paragraphs 1, 2(2), 3 and 6.
1982 c. 53	Administration of Justice Act 1982	Section 60.
1984 c. 28	County Courts Act 1984	In Schedule 3, paragraphs 1 to 3, 4(2) and 10.

==== Part II: Finance ====
Part II — Finance
Citation	Short title	Extent of repeal
Group 1 - Land Tax
27 Geo. 3. c. 34	Duchy of Lancaster Act 1787	In section 2, the words “after deducting the land tax chargeable thereon”.
38 Geo. 3. c. 5	Land Tax Act 1797	The whole act.
42 Geo. 3. c. 116	Land Tax Redemption Act 1802	The whole act.
50 Geo. 3. c. 58	Land Tax Redemption Act 1810	The whole act.
53 Geo. 3. c. 123	Land Tax Redemption Act 1813	The whole act.
57 Geo. 3. c. 100	Land Tax Redemption Act 1817	The whole act.
26 & 27 Vict. c. 49	Duchy of Cornwall Management Act 1863	Section 8 from “or in the redemption” to “for that purpose.”
59 & 60 Vict. c. 28	Finance Act 1896	Part VI.
12, 13 & 14 Geo. 6. c. 47	Finance Act 1949	Part V.
12, 13 & 14 Geo. 6. c. 47	Finance Act 1949	Section 52(6).
12, 13 & 14 Geo. 6. c. 47	Finance Act 1949	Schedule 9.
12, 13 & 14 Geo. 6. c. 47	Finance Act 1949	In Schedule 11, Part VI.
1963 c. 25	Finance Act 1963	Section 68.
1963 c. 25	Finance Act 1963	In Schedule 14, Parts V and VI.
Group 2 - Other Repeals
14 Geo. 3. c. 21	Bank of Ayr Act 1774	The whole act.
7 Geo. 4. c. 6	Bank Notes Act 1826	The whole act.
19 & 20 Vict. c. 43	Hereditary Revenues Act 1856	The whole act.
43 & 44 Vict. c. 8	Isle of Man Loans Act 1880	The whole act.
44 & 45 Vict. c. 38	Public Works Loans Act 1881	The whole act.
55 & 56 Vict. c. 35	Colonial Stock Act 1892	Section 3.
1 Edw. 7. c. 7	Finance Act 1901	Section 10(3) from “in the case of a customs duty” to “excise duty”; and section 10(4).
9 Edw. 7. c. 47	Development and Road Improvement Funds Act 1909	The whole act.
4 & 5 Geo. 5. c. 30	Injuries in War (Compensation) Act 1914	In section 1(3), the words “or to any compensation under the Workmen’s Compensation Act 1906”, “the Employers' Liability Act 1880 or” and from “or to any gratuity” to “1909”.
5 & 6 Geo. 5. c. 18	Injuries in War (Compensation) Act 1914 (Session 2)	Section 1(3) from “or to any gratuity” to “1914”.
5 & 6 Geo. 5. c. 93	War Loan (Supplemental Provisions) Act 1915	The whole act.
7 & 8 Geo. 5. c. 54	Naval and Military War Pensions, &c. (Committees) Act 1917	The whole Act as it applies to the Isle of Man.
11 & 12 Geo. 5. c. 39	Admiralty Pensions Act 1921	In section 2(3)(a), the words “and the Injuries in War (Compensation) Act 1915; or”.
14 & 15 Geo. 5. c. 21	Finance Act 1924	Sections 35 and 37.
14 & 15 Geo. 5 c. 19 (N.I.)	Finance Act (Northern Ireland) 1924	Section 8.
17 & 18 Geo. 5. c. 15	Workmen’s Compensation (Transfer of Funds) Act 1927	The whole act.
25 & 26 Geo. 5. c. 23	Superannuation Act 1935	The whole act.
2 & 3 Geo. 6. c. 11	Czecho-Slovakia (Restrictions on Banking Accounts, &c.) Act 1939	The whole act.
6 & 7 Geo. 6. c. 6	Workmen’s Compensation Act 1943	The whole act.
14 Geo. 6. c. 12	Foreign Compensation Act 1950	The preamble and section 2.
14 Geo. 6. c. 12	Foreign Compensation Act 1950	Section 4(4).
14 Geo. 6. c. 12	Foreign Compensation Act 1950	Section 6(3) from “beginning” to “period”.
11 & 12 Eliz. 2. c. 4	Foreign Compensation Act 1962	The preamble and sections 1 and 2.
1963 c. 25	Finance Act 1963	Section 5.
1963 c. 25	Finance Act 1963	Section 62(5).
1963 c. 25	Finance Act 1963	In Schedule 14, Part I.
1964 c. 60	Emergency Laws (Re-enactments and Repeals) Act 1964	Section 6.
1965 c. 10	Superannuation (Amendment) Act 1965	The whole act.
1965 c. 62	Redundancy Payments Act 1965	The whole act.
1966 c. 18	Finance Act 1966	Section 53(5).
1967 c. 53	Prices and Incomes Act 1967	The whole act.
1968 c. 13	National Loans Act 1968	Section 3(7) to (10).
1968 c. 13	National Loans Act 1968	Schedule 3.
1968 c. 32	Industrial Expansion Act 1968	The whole act.
1969 c. 19	Decimal Currency Act 1969	Section 3(3)(f).
1969 c. 20	Foreign Compensation Act 1969	The preamble and section 1.
1969 c. 20	Foreign Compensation Act 1969	Section 2(2).
1969 c. 20	Foreign Compensation Act 1969	Section 3(11) and (12).
1969 c. 20	Foreign Compensation Act 1969	Section 4(1).
1971 c. 24	Coinage Act 1971	In Schedule 2, the entry relating to section 42 of the Customs Consolidation Act 1876.
1972 c. 74	Counter-Inflation (Temporary Provisions) Act 1972	The whole act.
1973 c. 7	Concorde Aircraft Act 1973	The whole act.
1974 c. 24	Prices Act 1974	Sections 1, 6 and 8(2).
1974 c. 24	Prices Act 1974	In the Schedule— (a) paragraphs 1, 2 and 4; (b) paragraph 3 except as it has effect for the purposes of paragraph 9.
1975 c. 18	Social Security (Consequential Provisions) Act 1975	In Schedule 3, paragraphs 23 and 34.
1975 c. 32	Prices Act 1975	Section 1.
1975 c. 55	Statutory Corporations (Financial Provisions) Act 1975	Sections 1 and 2.
1975 c. 55	Statutory Corporations (Financial Provisions) Act 1975	Schedule 1.
1975 c. 57	Remuneration, Charges and Grants Act 1975	The whole act.
1977 c. 33	Price Commission Act 1977	Section 17.
1978 c. 36	House of Commons (Administration) Act 1978	In Schedule 2, paragraph 4.
1978 c. 44	Employment Protection (Consolidation) Act 1978	In Schedule 15, paragraphs 6, 7, 9, 11, 13, 16 and 19.
1978 c. 44	Employment Protection (Consolidation) Act 1978	In Schedule 16, paragraph 1.
1980 c. 21	Competition Act 1980	Section 1.
1980 c. 21	Competition Act 1980	Schedule 1.
1981 c. 35	Finance Act 1981	In section 135(1), the words “and capital transfer tax”.
1982 c. 16	Civil Aviation Act 1982	In Schedule 15, paragraph 7.
1983 c. 29	Miscellaneous Financial Provisions Act 1983	Section 3.
1985 c. 54	Finance Act 1985	In Schedule 25, paragraph 10.

==== Part III: Ireland ====
Part III — Ireland
Citation	Short title	Extent of repeal
12 & 13 Geo. 5. c. 4	Irish Free State (Agreement) Act 1922	The whole act.
13 Geo. 5. Sess. 2. c. 1	Irish Free State Constitution Act 1922 (Session 2)	The whole act.
13 Geo. 5. Sess. 2. c. 2	Irish Free State (Consequential Provisions) Act 1922 (Session 2)	Section 1(1) except the words “the First Schedule to this Act shall” and “have effect”.
13 Geo. 5. Sess. 2. c. 2	Irish Free State (Consequential Provisions) Act 1922 (Session 2)	Section 2.
13 Geo. 5. Sess. 2. c. 2	Irish Free State (Consequential Provisions) Act 1922 (Session 2)	Section 5 except as it applies to estate duty and stamp duties.
13 Geo. 5. Sess. 2. c. 2	Irish Free State (Consequential Provisions) Act 1922 (Session 2)	Section 6(1) (b) and (c).
13 Geo. 5. Sess. 2. c. 2	Irish Free State (Consequential Provisions) Act 1922 (Session 2)	Schedule 2.
15 & 16 Geo. 5. c. 77	Ireland (Confirmation of Agreement) Act 1925	The whole act.
20 & 21 Geo. 5. c. 4	Irish Free State (Confirmation of Agreement) Act 1929	The whole act.

==== Part IV: Local Government ====
Part IV — Local Government
Citation	Short title	Description	Extent of repeal
8 & 9 Will. 3. c. 37	Streets (London) Act 1696	An Act for explaining and enforcing the Act [2 Will. & Mar. Sess. 2. c.8] and for widening the street at the south end of London Bridge.	The whole act.
2 & 3 Vict. c. xciv	City of London Police Act 1839	City of London Police Act 1839.	The preamble and section 1.
2 & 3 Vict. c. xciv	City of London Police Act 1839	City of London Police Act 1839.	In section 2, the definitions of “house” and “rate”.
2 & 3 Vict. c. xciv	City of London Police Act 1839	City of London Police Act 1839.	In section 3, the words “not less than eight hundred pounds”.
2 & 3 Vict. c. xciv	City of London Police Act 1839	City of London Police Act 1839.	Sections 7 and 10.
2 & 3 Vict. c. xciv	City of London Police Act 1839	City of London Police Act 1839.	Sections 58 to 69, 71 to 86, 88 to 91, 93 to 96, 104 and 105.
2 & 3 Vict. c. xciv	City of London Police Act 1839	City of London Police Act 1839.	The following words, wherever occurring— “and liberties”, “and the liberties thereof”, “or the liberties thereof”.
10 & 11 Vict. c. 89	Town Police Clauses Act 1847	Town Police Clauses Act 1847.	Sections 77 and 78 as they apply to England and Wales.
27 & 28 Vict. c. 55	Metropolitan Police Act 1864	Metropolitan Police Act 1864.	The whole act.
29 & 30 Vict. c. 79	Local Government Supplemental Act 1866 (No. 2)	Local Government Supplemental Act 1866 (No. 2).	The whole act.
38 & 39 Vict. c. 55	Public Health Act 1875	Public Health Act 1875.	Section 3.
38 & 39 Vict. c. 55	Public Health Act 1875	Public Health Act 1875.	In section 4— (a) the definitions from that of “Borough” to that of “Guardians” and from that of “Sewer” onwards; (b) in the definition of “Street”, the words “(not being a county bridge)”.
38 & 39 Vict. c. 55	Public Health Act 1875	Public Health Act 1875.	Sections 313 and 317.
38 & 39 Vict. c. 55	Public Health Act 1875	Public Health Act 1875.	Schedule 4.
38 & 39 Vict. c. 55	Public Health Act 1875	Public Health Act 1875.	In Part III of Schedule 5, the paragraphs relating to the Act 35 & 36 Vict. c.79.
39 & 40 Vict. c. 56	Commons Act 1876	Commons Act 1876.	In section 37, the definitions of “municipal borough”, “improvement Act district” and “local government district”.
45 & 46 Vict. c. 50	Municipal Corporations Act 1882	Municipal Corporations Act 1882.	Sections 2, 220 and 260.
45 & 46 Vict. c. 50	Municipal Corporations Act 1882	Municipal Corporations Act 1882.	In Part I of Schedule 9, the entries relating to the Town Gardens Protection Act 1863, the Dogs Act 1871, the Public Health Act 1875 and the Commons Act 1876.
53 & 54 Vict. c. 59	Public Health Acts Amendment Act 1890	Public Health Acts Amendment Act 1890.	Section 1.
56 & 57 Vict. c. 73	Local Government Act 1894	Local Government Act 1894.	Section 27(1)(a) and (2).
7 Edw. 7. c. 53	Public Health Acts Amendment Act 1907	Public Health Acts Amendment Act 1907.	Section 1.
7 Edw. 7. c. 53	Public Health Acts Amendment Act 1907	Public Health Acts Amendment Act 1907.	In section 13, as it applies to England and Wales, the definitions of “the commencement of this Part” and “the commencement of this section”.
9 & 10 Geo. 5. c. lxxiii	City of London Police Act 1919	City of London Police Act 1919.	The whole act.
10 & 11 Geo. 5. c. xxvii	City of London (Various Powers) Act 1920	City of London (Various Powers) Act 1920.	Section 14.
15 & 16 Geo. 5. c. 71	Public Health Act 1925	Public Health Act 1925.	Section 1(5).
15 & 16 Geo. 5. c. 71	Public Health Act 1925	Public Health Act 1925.	In Schedule 4, the words from “(except” to “section”)”.
19 & 20 Geo. 5. c. 17	Local Government Act 1929	Local Government Act 1929.	Sections 121 to 126.
19 & 20 Geo. 5. c. 17	Local Government Act 1929	Local Government Act 1929.	In section 134, the definitions of “Registration officer”, “Road officer” and “Transferred officer”.
19 & 20 Geo. 5. c. 17	Local Government Act 1929	Local Government Act 1929.	Schedule 8.
23 & 24 Geo. 5. c. 43	Local Government and other Officers Superannuation (Temporary Provisions) Act 1933	Local Government and other Officers Superannuation (Temporary Provisions) Act 1933.	The whole act.
26 Geo. 5 & 1 Edw. 8. c. 49	Public Health Act 1936	Public Health Act 1936.	Section 287(6).
26 Geo. 5 & 1 Edw. 8. c. 49	Public Health Act 1936	Public Health Act 1936.	In section 343(1), the definitions of “bridge authority”, “county district”, “emoluments”, “highway authority” and “hospital”.
26 Geo. 5 & 1 Edw. 8. c. 49	Public Health Act 1936	Public Health Act 1936.	Section 345.
26 Geo. 5 & 1 Edw. 8. c. 49	Public Health Act 1936	Public Health Act 1936.	Section 346(1)(d) and (2).
11 & 12 Geo. 6. c. 26	Local Government Act 1948	Local Government Act 1948.	Sections 105, 125 and 138.
14 & 15 Geo. 6. c. 65	Reserve and Auxiliary Forces (Protection of Civil Interests) Act 1951	Reserve and Auxiliary Forces (Protection of Civil Interests) Act 1951.	Section 50(2), as it applies to Great Britain.
9 & 10 Eliz. 2. c. 64	Public Health Act 1961	Public Health Act 1961.	Section 52(1) from “and section three” onwards.
9 & 10 Eliz. 2. c. 64	Public Health Act 1961	Public Health Act 1961.	Section 53(2) from “and sections three” onwards; and section 53(5).
9 & 10 Eliz. 2. c. 64	Public Health Act 1961	Public Health Act 1961.	Section 54(6) from “and sections three” onwards.
1964 c. 18	Rating (Interim Relief) Act 1964	Rating (Interim Relief) Act 1964.	The whole act.
1966 c. 42	Local Government Act 1966	Local Government Act 1966.	Section 15.
1966 c. 42	Local Government Act 1966	Local Government Act 1966.	In section 40(1), the words “regulations or rules”.
1966 c. 42	Local Government Act 1966	Local Government Act 1966.	In section 40(2), the words “other than section 2 or 3”.
1966 c. 42	Local Government Act 1966	Local Government Act 1966.	In section 40(3), the words “regulations or rules under this Act or” and “32”.
1966 c. 42	Local Government Act 1966	Local Government Act 1966.	In section 41(1), the definitions of “the appropriate Minister”, “dwelling-house”, “hereditament”, “joint board”, “land”, “rate”, “rate period”, “rate support grant order”, “rating authority” and “year”.
1966 c. 42	Local Government Act 1966	Local Government Act 1966.	Section 41(2) and (3).
1972 c. 70	Local Government Act 1972	Local Government Act 1972.	Sections 17 and 36.
1972 c. 70	Local Government Act 1972	Local Government Act 1972.	Section 217(7).
1972 c. 70	Local Government Act 1972	Local Government Act 1972.	Section 250(2) from “or may instead” to “affirmation”.
1973 c. 65	Local Government (Scotland) Act 1973	Local Government (Scotland) Act 1973.	In Schedule 25, paragraph 24.
1974 c. 7	Local Government Act 1974	Local Government Act 1974.	In Schedule 6, paragraph 5.
1979 c. 55	Justices of the Peace Act 1979	Justices of the Peace Act 1979.	In Schedule 2, paragraph 19.
1980 c. 53	Health Services Act 1980	Health Services Act 1980.	In Schedule 1, paragraph 15.
1980 c. 65	Local Government, Planning and Land Act 1980	Local Government, Planning and Land Act 1980.	Sections 182, 187, 188, 189 and 190.
1985 c. 72	Weights and Measures Act 1985	Weights and Measures Act 1985.	Section 69(6).

==== Part V: Medicine ====
Part V — Medicine
Citation	Short title	Extent of repeal
55 Geo. 3. c. 194	Apothecaries Act 1815	The whole act.
14 & 15 Vict. c. 99	Evidence Act 1851	Section 8.
37 & 38 Vict. c. 34	Apothecaries Act Amendment Act 1874	The whole act.
7 Edw. 7. c. xxii	Apothecaries Act 1907	The whole act.
2 & 3 Eliz. 2. c. 61	Pharmacy Act 1954	Section 4(2)(b).
1977 c. 49	National Health Service Act 1977	In Schedule 14, paragraph 7(2).

==== Part VI: Overseas Jurisdiction ====
Part VI — Overseas Jurisdiction
Citation	Short title	Extent of repeal
13 & 14 Vict. c. 70	Canterbury Settlements Lands Act 1850	The whole act.
14 & 15 Vict. c. 84	Canterbury Association Act 1851	The whole act.
15 & 16 Vict. c. 72	New Zealand Constitution Act 1852	The whole act.
28 & 29 Vict. c. 63	Colonial Laws Validity Act 1865	Section 7.
39 & 40 Vict. c. 59	Appellate Jurisdiction Act 1876	Section 23.
56 & 57 Vict. c. 72	Colonial Acts Confirmation Act 1894	The whole act.
58 & 59 Vict. c. 34	Colonial Boundaries Act 1895	Section 1(2) and (3).
58 & 59 Vict. c. 34	Colonial Boundaries Act 1895	The Schedule.
1 Edw. 7. c. 29	Colonial Acts Confirmation Act 1901	The whole act.
7 Edw. 7. c. 7	Australian States Constitution Act 1907	The whole act.
24 & 25 Geo. 5. c. 49	Whaling Industry (Regulation) Act 1934	In section 1, the words “or associated state” and “or associated states”.
24 & 25 Geo. 5. c. 49	Whaling Industry (Regulation) Act 1934	Section 11 from “or British protectorate” onwards.
24 & 25 Geo. 5. c. 49	Whaling Industry (Regulation) Act 1934	Section 12(b) and the preceding “or”.
24 & 25 Geo. 5. c. 49	Whaling Industry (Regulation) Act 1934	In section 13(1), the word “Newfoundland”; and section 13(2).
24 & 25 Geo. 5. c. 49	Whaling Industry (Regulation) Act 1934	Section 15.
11 & 12 Geo. 6. c. 3	Burma Independence Act 1947	The whole act.
11 & 12 Geo. 6. c. 4	New Zealand Constitution (Amendment) Act 1947	The whole act.
5 & 6 Eliz. 2. c. 60	Federation of Malaya Independence Act 1957	Section 3.
10 & 11 Eliz. 2. c. 19	West Indies Act 1962	Sections 1 and 2.
10 & 11 Eliz. 2. c. 19	West Indies Act 1962	Section 4(5) and (6).
10 & 11 Eliz. 2. c. 23	South Africa Act 1962	In Schedule 2, paragraph 6.
10 & 11 Eliz. 2. c. 23	South Africa Act 1962	In Schedule 3, paragraphs 7 and 10.
1963 c. 35	Malaysia Act 1963	Section 5.
1966 c. 14	Guyana Independence Act 1966	Section 6.
1966 c. 14	Guyana Independence Act 1966	Section 8(1) and (3).
1971 c. 19	Carriage of Goods by Sea Act 1971	Section 5(1)(d).
1979 c. 60	Zimbabwe Act 1979	In Schedule 2, paragraph 4 as it applies to Great Britain.

==== Part VII: Planning and Land ====
Part VII — Planning and Land
Citation	Short title	Extent of repeal
Group 1 - General Repeals
22 Vict. c. 12	Defence Act 1859	Section 2 from “but this enactment” onwards.
31 & 32 Vict. c. 89	Inclosure, &c. Expenses Act 1868	In section 1, the proviso.
31 & 32 Vict. c. 89	Inclosure, &c. Expenses Act 1868	Section 3.
33 & 34 Vict. c. 13	Survey Act 1870	The whole act.
1 & 2 Geo. 5. c. 49	Small Landholders (Scotland) Act 1911	In section 4(14), the words “any powers or duties under the Survey Act 1870, or”.
25 & 26 Geo. 5. c. 47	Restriction of Ribbon Development Act 1935	The whole act.
6 & 7 Geo. 6. c. 5	Minister of Town and Country Planning Act 1943	The whole act.
6 & 7 Geo. 6. c. 43	Town and Country Planning (Interim Development) (Scotland) Act 1943	The whole act.
8 & 9 Geo. 6. c. 43	Requisitioned Land and War Works Act 1945	Sections 17(4), 18 and 22(2).
8 & 9 Geo. 6. c. 43	Requisitioned Land and War Works Act 1945	In section 59(1), the definitions of “Defence Regulation”, “dwelling-house” and “local planning authority”; and section 59(6).
8 & 9 Geo. 6. c. 43	Requisitioned Land and War Works Act 1945	Section 60(3) from “for any reference to a justices' licence” onwards; and section 60(12) from “and for” to “1947”.
8 & 9 Geo. 6. c. 43	Requisitioned Land and War Works Act 1945	Section 61(9) and (11).
9 & 10 Geo. 6. c. 35	Building Restrictions (War-Time Contraventions) Act 1946	The whole Act as it relates to building laws, that is.
9 & 10 Geo. 6. c. 35	Building Restrictions (War-Time Contraventions) Act 1946	Section 1(1); and in section 1(2), the words “with a building law or”, “building law or” and “as the case may be.”
9 & 10 Geo. 6. c. 35	Building Restrictions (War-Time Contraventions) Act 1946	In sections 2, 3(1), 4(1) and 7(6), the words “building law or”, “building laws or”, and “law or”, wherever occurring.
9 & 10 Geo. 6. c. 35	Building Restrictions (War-Time Contraventions) Act 1946	Section 3(2) to (6).
9 & 10 Geo. 6. c. 35	Building Restrictions (War-Time Contraventions) Act 1946	In section 5(1), the words “building law or” and “with a building law or”.
9 & 10 Geo. 6. c. 35	Building Restrictions (War-Time Contraventions) Act 1946	In section 7(1), the definitions of “building law” and “local Act”; and section 7(2) and (4).
9 & 10 Geo. 6. c. 35	Building Restrictions (War-Time Contraventions) Act 1946	Section 8(5)(a).
9 & 10 Geo. 6. c. 35	Building Restrictions (War-Time Contraventions) Act 1946	Section 9(5)(c) and 9(6).
10 & 11 Geo. 6. c. 51	Town and Country Planning Act 1947	Section 119.
10 & 11 Geo. 6. c. 51	Town and Country Planning Act 1947	In Schedule 8, the entries relating to the Roads Improvement Act 1925, the Trunk Roads Act 1936, the Requisitioned Land and War Works Act 1945 and the Trunk Roads Act 1946.
10 & 11 Geo. 6. c. 53	Town and Country Planning (Scotland) Act 1947	In Schedule 8, the entries relating to section 60(12) of the Requisitioned Land and War Works Act 1945 and the Trunk Roads Act 1936.
11 & 12 Geo. 6. c. 17	Requisitioned Land and War Works Act 1948	In the Schedule, paragraph 1.
12, 13 & 14 Geo. 6. c. 42	Lands Tribunal Act 1949	Section 1(3)(d) and (8)(b).
2 & 3 Eliz. 2. c. 72	Town and Country Planning Act 1954	Section 69(1) and (2).
2 & 3 Eliz. 2. c. 72	Town and Country Planning Act 1954	Section 72(2) and (3).
2 & 3 Eliz. 2. c. 73	Town and Country Planning (Scotland) Act 1954	Section 69(1), (2), (3), (4), (6), (7) and (8).
2 & 3 Eliz. 2. c. 73	Town and Country Planning (Scotland) Act 1954	Section 71(2).
7 & 8 Eliz. 2. c. 24	Building (Scotland) Act 1959	Section 6(8) from “section seventeen” to “1935”.
7 & 8 Eliz. 2. c. 24	Building (Scotland) Act 1959	In Schedule 9, paragraph 4.
7 & 8 Eliz. 2. c. 53	Town and Country Planning Act 1959	Sections 14 to 16.
7 & 8 Eliz. 2. c. 53	Town and Country Planning Act 1959	In section 57(1), the definition of “highway”.
7 & 8 Eliz. 2. c. 53	Town and Country Planning Act 1959	Section 57(10) and (11).
7 & 8 Eliz. 2. c. 70	Town and Country Planning (Scotland) Act 1959	Sections 14 to 16.
9 & 10 Eliz. 2. c. 33	Land Compensation Act 1961	Section 13.
9 & 10 Eliz. 2. c. 33	Land Compensation Act 1961	Section 40(5).
9 & 10 Eliz. 2. c. 33	Land Compensation Act 1961	Section 41 from “or served” to “1945”.
10 & 11 Eliz. 2. c. 36	Local Authorities (Historic Buildings) Act 1962	In section 1(1)(b), as it applies to Scotland, the words “with the consent of the Secretary of State,”.
10 & 11 Eliz. 2. c. 38	Town and Country Planning Act 1962	Section 224.
10 & 11 Eliz. 2. c. 38	Town and Country Planning Act 1962	In Schedule 12, the entry relating to the Highways Act 1959.
1963 c. 33	London Government Act 1963	Section 62(1)(d).
1963 c. 33	London Government Act 1963	In Schedule 17, paragraph 20(b).
1963 c. 51	Land Compensation (Scotland) Act 1963	Section 21.
1963 c. 51	Land Compensation (Scotland) Act 1963	Section 48 from “or served” to “1945”.
1967 c. 69	Civic Amenities Act 1967	In section 5(a), the words “and the Minister of Housing and Local Government” and “and the Secretary of State”.
1968 c. 72	Town and Country Planning Act 1968	Sections 27, 58, 103, 104, 105, 107 and 109(3).
1968 c. 72	Town and Country Planning Act 1968	Schedule 10.
1969 c. 30	Town and Country Planning (Scotland) Act 1969	Sections 58 and 102.
1969 c. 30	Town and Country Planning (Scotland) Act 1969	In section 103(1), the definition of “the Act of 1959”; and section 103(2) and (4).
1969 c. 30	Town and Country Planning (Scotland) Act 1969	Section 104.
1972 c. 11	Superannuation Act 1972	Section 19.
1973 c. 65	Local Government (Scotland) Act 1973	In Schedule 15, paragraph 25.
1973 c. 65	Local Government (Scotland) Act 1973	In Schedule 25, paragraph 15.
1981 c. 69	Wildlife and Countryside Act 1981	Section 72(1).
1984 c. 12	Telecommunications Act 1984	In Schedule 4, paragraph 20.
1984 c. 54	Roads (Scotland) Act 1984	In Schedule 9, paragraph 29.
1984 c. 55	Building Act 1984	In Schedule 6, paragraph 1.
Group 2 - Architects' Registration
21 & 22 Geo. 5. c. 33	Architects (Registration) Act 1931	Section 3(3) from “within” to “thereafter” except the word “to”; and section 3(4) from “not later” to “thereafter” except the word “annually”.
21 & 22 Geo. 5. c. 33	Architects (Registration) Act 1931	Section 6(1)(b).
21 & 22 Geo. 5. c. 33	Architects (Registration) Act 1931	In Schedule 1— (a) paragraph 1 from “Provided that” onwards; (b) paragraph 4.
21 & 22 Geo. 5. c. 33	Architects (Registration) Act 1931	In Schedule 2, the proviso to paragraph 1.
21 & 22 Geo. 5. c. 33	Architects (Registration) Act 1931	In Schedule 3, the proviso.
1 & 2 Geo. 6. c. 54	Architects Registration Act 1938	Section 1(1) from “and where” onwards; and section 1(2).
1 & 2 Geo. 6. c. 54	Architects Registration Act 1938	Section 2.
1 & 2 Geo. 6. c. 54	Architects Registration Act 1938	In section 3(c)(i), the words “or this Act”.
1969 c. 42	Architects Registration (Amendment) Act 1969	Section 2.
Group 3 - Duchy of Lancaster
19 Geo. 3. c. 45	Duchy of Lancaster Act 1779	Sections 4 and 6.
19 Geo. 3. c. 45	Duchy of Lancaster Act 1779	Section 7 from “and also” to “for ever”.
19 Geo. 3. c. 45	Duchy of Lancaster Act 1779	Sections 8, 9 and 11.
19 Geo. 3. c. 45	Duchy of Lancaster Act 1779	Section 12 so far as it relates to assurances for enfranchisement.
19 Geo. 3. c. 45	Duchy of Lancaster Act 1779	Section 13 from “or by the enfranchisement” to “hereditaments”.
27 Geo. 3. c. 34	Duchy of Lancaster Act 1787	Section 3.
48 Geo. 3. c. 73	Duchy of Lancaster Act 1808	Section 10 from “and of ground” to “county or district” where secondly occurring.
48 Geo. 3. c. 73	Duchy of Lancaster Act 1808	In section 12, the words “enfranchisements of copyholds and” and “respectively”.
48 Geo. 3. c. 73	Duchy of Lancaster Act 1808	In section 17, the words “enfranchisements of copyholds, and”.
48 Geo. 3. c. 73	Duchy of Lancaster Act 1808	In section 18, the words “for the enfranchisement of any copyhold or”.
48 Geo. 3. c. 73	Duchy of Lancaster Act 1808	Section 31.

==== Part VIII: Religious Disabilities ====
Part VIII — Religious Disabilities
Citation	Short title	Extent of repeal
31 Hen. 8. c. 13	Suppression of Religious Houses Act 1539	Section 19.
34 & 35 Hen. 8. c. 19	Religious Houses Act 1542	The whole act.
37 Hen. 8. c. 20	Religious Houses Act 1545	The whole act.
1 Eliz. 1. c. 24	Religious Houses Act 1558	The whole act.
13 Anne c. 13 (Note: This is the citation in The Statutes of the Realm.)	Presentation of Benefices Act 1713	Sections 9 and 11.
2 & 3 Will. 4. c. 115	Roman Catholic Charities Act 1832	The whole act.
9 & 10 Vict. c. 59	Religious Disabilities Act 1846	The whole act.
18 & 19 Vict. c. 86	Liberty of Religious Worship Act 1855	The whole act.
30 & 31 Vict. c. 62	Test Abolition Act 1867	The whole act.
16 & 17 Geo. 5. c. 55	Roman Catholic Relief Act 1926	The whole act.

==== Part IX: South Yorkshire ====
Part IX — South Yorkshire
Citation	Short title	Extent of repeal
Group 1 - Barnsley
3 Geo. 4. c. xxv	Barnsley Improvement Act 1822	The whole act.
16 Vict. c. 24	Public Health Supplemental Act 1853 (No. 1)	Section 5.
16 Vict. c. 24	Public Health Supplemental Act 1853 (No. 1)	In the Schedule, the order relating to Barnsley.
16 & 17 Vict. c. cvii	Barnsley Waterworks Act 1853	The whole Act except sections 1, 44, 45, 60, 61, 64 and 66.
23 & 24 Vict. c. 44	Local Government Supplemental Act 1860	In the Schedule, the order relating to Barnsley.
25 & 26 Vict. c. xxxii	Barnsley Local Board Act 1862	The whole Act except sections 1, 13 and 20.
29 & 30 Vict. c. xcviii	Barnsley Local Board Amendment Act 1866	The whole act.
38 & 39 Vict. c. ccxi	Local Government Board’s Provisional Orders Confirmation (Abingdon, Barnsley &c.) Act 1875	In the Schedule, the order relating to Barnsley.
42 & 43 Vict. c. cxxiv	Wombwell Local Board Gas Act 1879	The whole Act except sections 1 and 14 and Schedule 1.
43 & 44 Vict. c. lxxxiii	Local Government Board’s Provisional Orders Confirmation (Alnwick Union &c.) Act 1880	In the Schedule, both the orders relating to Barnsley.
47 & 48 Vict. c. ccxiv	Local Government Board’s Provisional Orders Confirmation (No. 7) Act 1884	In the Schedule, the order relating to Barnsley.
53 & 54 Vict. c. clxxxix	Electric Lighting Orders Confirmation (No. 4) Act 1890	In the Schedule, the Barnsley Electric Lighting Order except Articles 1, 2, 15 and 16.
55 & 56 Vict. c. lxix	Local Government Board’s Provisional Orders Confirmation (No. 2) Act 1892	Section 2.
55 & 56 Vict. c. lxix	Local Government Board’s Provisional Orders Confirmation (No. 2) Act 1892	In the Schedule, the order relating to Barnsley.
56 & 57 Vict. c. cxv	Local Government Board’s Provisional Orders Confirmation (No. 4) Act 1893	In the Schedule, the order relating to Barnsley.
58 & 59 Vict. c. xli	Local Government Board’s Provisional Orders Confirmation (No. 2) Act 1895	In the Schedule, the Hemsworth Rural (Hemsworth) Order.
59 & 60 Vict. c. lii	Barnsley Corporation (Water) Act 1896	Sections 2 and 4 to 6.
59 & 60 Vict. c. lii	Barnsley Corporation (Water) Act 1896	Section 7(2) and (3).
59 & 60 Vict. c. lii	Barnsley Corporation (Water) Act 1896	Sections 8, 9 and 15 to 18.
59 & 60 Vict. c. lii	Barnsley Corporation (Water) Act 1896	Section 19(1); and section 19(2) from “and the Corporation” onwards.
59 & 60 Vict. c. lii	Barnsley Corporation (Water) Act 1896	Section 21.
59 & 60 Vict. c. lii	Barnsley Corporation (Water) Act 1896	Section 23 from “and Thickwoods Brook” to “catchwater (No. 1)”.
59 & 60 Vict. c. lii	Barnsley Corporation (Water) Act 1896	Sections 24 to 32, 35, 36, 39, 40, 42, 43, 46 to 59 and 61 to 67.
59 & 60 Vict. c. lii	Barnsley Corporation (Water) Act 1896	Schedules 1 and 2.
63 & 64 Vict. c. clv	Barnsley Corporation (Water) Act 1900	The whole Act except sections 1, 7, 13 and 15.
2 Edw. 7. c. lxxxi	Local Government Board’s Provisional Orders Confirmation (No. 5) Act 1902	In the Schedule, the Barnsley Order 1902.
3 Edw. 7. c. lxv	Local Government Board’s Provisional Orders Confirmation (Gas) Act 1903	In the Schedule, the Cudworth Gas Order 1903.
7 Edw. 7. c. cli	Local Government Board’s Provisional Orders Confirmation (No. 1) Act 1907	In the Schedule, the Barnsley Order 1907.
1 & 2 Geo. 5. c. cli	Local Government Board’s Provisional Orders Confirmation (Gas) Act 1911	In the Schedule, the Cudworth Gas Order 1911 except Articles 1, 2 and 7(2).
2 & 3 Geo. 5. c. cxiv	Electric Lighting Orders Confirmation (No. 1) Act 1912	In the Schedule, the Hoyland Nether Electric Lighting Order 1912.
2 & 3 Geo. 5. c. cxxxviii	Local Government Board’s Provisional Orders Confirmation (No. 12) Act 1912	The whole act.
3 & 4 Geo. 5. c. cxxxi	Local Government Board’s Provisional Orders Confirmation (No. 7) Act 1913	In the Schedule, the Wombwell Order 1913 except Article 1 and Schedule A.
4 & 5 Geo. 5. c. xli	Barnsley Corporation Act 1914	The whole act.
5 & 6 Geo. 5. c. lxxxv	Electric Lighting Orders Confirmation (No. 5) Act 1915	The whole act.
5 & 6 Geo. 5. c. xciii	Local Government Board’s Provisional Orders Confirmation (No. 8) Act 1915	In the Schedule, the Wombwell Order 1915 except Article 14; and in that Article paragraph (1) from “or in case” to “Article”, paragraph (3) from “the amount” onwards and paragraph (6).
11 & 12 Geo. 5. c. cii	Ministry of Health Provisional Order Confirmation (Barnsley Extension) Act 1921	The whole act.
13 & 14 Geo. 5. c. lxxxix	Barnsley Corporation Act 1923	The whole Act except sections 1, 2, 4, 5, 11, 12(5) to (9), 13(5) to (9), 16, 18 to 22, 24 and 112.
16 & 17 Geo. 5. c. xix	Ministry of Health Provisional Orders Confirmation (No. 1) Act 1926	In the Schedule, the Barnsley Order 1926.
17 & 18 Geo. 5. c. xxi	Barnsley Corporation (Water) Act 1927	The whole Act except— (a) sections 1, 3, 4, 16 to 21, 23, 24(5), 25, 26 and 36; (b) section 10 as it extends and applies section 45 of the Barnsley Corporation (Water) Act 1896.
17 & 18 Geo. 5. c. xxxiv	Ministry of Health Provisional Orders Confirmation (No. 5) Act 1927	In the Schedule, the Barnsley Order 1927.
SR&O 1929/961	Wombwell Gas (Charges) Order 1929	The whole order.
20 & 21 Geo. 5. c. lxxiii	Barnsley and District Light Railways (Abandonment) Act 1930	The whole act.
SR&O 1931/646	Wombwell Gas Order 1931	The whole Order except Articles 1 and 10.
23 & 24 Geo. 5. c. xlvi	Dearne District Traction Act 1933	The whole act.
SR&O 1935/588	Borough of Barnsley (Scale of Water Charges) Order 1935	The whole order.
1 Edw. 8 & 1 Geo. 6. c. xxxviii	Barnsley Corporation Act 1937	The whole Act except sections 1, 2, 4(1)(a) and (2), 5, 6, 10(1), 18 and 19 as they apply to the Council’s market undertaking.
12 & 13 Geo. 6. c. li	Barnsley Corporation Act 1949	The whole Act except sections 1, 3, 6 and 106.
SI 1952/531	Barnsley Water Order 1952	Articles 3, 8 and 12.
SI 1952/531	Barnsley Water Order 1952	Schedule 2.
4 & 5 Eliz. 2. c. lxxxv	Barnsley Corporation Act 1956	The whole Act except sections 1, 2, 3(b), 4, 5, 7, 9, 13, 16 to 18, 29, 80 and 85.
SI 1960/641	Barnsley Corporation (Water Charges) Order 1960	The whole order.
SI 1960/1195	Barnsley Water Order 1960	The whole order.
SI 1961/1877	Barnsley Water Order 1961	The whole order.
SI 1961/2057	Barnsley Water (Cranberry Holes) Order 1961	Articles 3 and 6.
SI 1961/2057	Barnsley Water (Cranberry Holes) Order 1961	The Schedule.
SI 1962/2873	Barnsley Water (Penistone Boreholes) Order 1962	Articles 3 and 6.
SI 1962/2873	Barnsley Water (Penistone Boreholes) Order 1962	The Schedule.
SI 1964/1866	Barnsley Corporation (Reduction of Compensation Water) Order 1964	The whole order.
SI 1965/419	Barnsley (Water Charges) Order 1965	The whole order.
SI 1965/1728	Barnsley Water Order 1965	The whole order.
SI 1968/1660	Barnsley Water Order 1968	Articles 4 and 5.
SI 1968/1660	Barnsley Water Order 1968	Schedule 2.
SI 1970/1575	Barnsley Corporation (Reduction of Compensation Water) Order 1970	The whole order.
Group 2 - Doncaster
43 Geo. 3. c. cxlvii	Doncaster Improvement Act 1803	The whole act.
14 & 15 Vict. c. 98	Public Health Supplemental Act 1851 No. 2	In the Schedule, the order relating to Doncaster.
36 & 37 Vict. c. cxxix	Doncaster Corporation Waterworks Act 1873	Sections 2, 3, 37 and 39 to 42.
36 & 37 Vict. c. cxxix	Doncaster Corporation Waterworks Act 1873	The Schedule.
43 & 44 Vict. c. xxix	Doncaster Corporation Waterworks Act 1880	Sections 2 and 4.
45 & 46 Vict. c. xxxiv	Local Government Board’s Provisional Orders Confirmation (Poor Law) Act 1882	In the Schedule, the order relating to Doncaster Union.
58 & 59 Vict. c. xci	Local Government Board’s Provisional Orders Confirmation (No. 12) Act 1895	In the Schedule, the Counties of Nottingham and West Riding of Yorkshire (Auckley and Wallingwells) Order 1895.
61 & 62 Vict. c. xl	Electric Lighting Orders Confirmation (No. 4) Act 1898	In the Schedule, the Doncaster Corporation Electric Lighting Order 1898 except Articles 1, 2, 15 and 16.
62 & 63 Vict. c. xxxiv	Electric Lighting Orders Confirmation (No. 1) Act 1899	In the Schedule, the Mexborough Electric Lighting Order 1899 except Articles 1, 2, 15 and 16.
63 & 64 Vict. c. clxxx	Local Government Board’s Provisional Orders Confirmation (No. 11) Act 1900	In the Schedule, the Doncaster and Mexborough Joint Hospital Order 1900.
1900 Cd. 59	Doncaster Corporation Light Railways Order 1899	The whole Order except Articles 1, 29, 30 and 31.
1 Edw. 7. c. cl	Local Government Board’s Provisional Orders Confirmation (No.9) Act 1901	In the Schedule, the Doncaster Rural Order 1900.
1902 Cd. 1250	Doncaster Corporation Light Railways (Deviation &c.) Order 1902	The whole order.
1903 Cd. 1572	Doncaster Corporation Light Railways (Extensions) Order 1903	The whole order.
4 Edw. 7. c. ciii	Doncaster Corporation Act 1904	The whole Act except sections 1, 15, 33, 55(1) and 199 and Schedule 2.
8 Edw. 7. c. lviii	Doncaster Corporation Act 1908	The whole Act except sections 1, 9 to 11 and 42.
10 Edw. 7. c. xx	Thorne and District Water Act 1910	Sections 46 and 49(3).
1911 Cd. 5801	Doncaster Corporation Light Railways (Extension) Order 1911	The whole order.
2 & 3 Geo. 5. c. cxv	Electric Lighting Orders Confirmation (No. 2) Act 1912	In the Schedule, the Doncaster Corporation Electric Lighting (Extension) Order 1912.
3 & 4 Geo. 5. c. cxxix	Local Government Board’s Provisional Orders Confirmation (No. 5) Act 1913	In the Schedule, the Doncaster Order 1913.
3 & 4 Geo. 5. c. cl	Electric Lighting Orders Confirmation (No. 2) Act 1913	Section 5.
3 & 4 Geo. 5. c. cl	Electric Lighting Orders Confirmation (No. 2) Act 1913	In the Schedule, the Doncaster Corporation Electric Lighting (Extension) Order 1913.
4 & 5 Geo. 5. c. clxxx	Local Government Board’s Provisional Orders Confirmation (No. 20) Act 1914	The whole act.
1914 Cd. 7406	Doncaster Corporation Light Railways (Extensions) Order 1914	The whole order.
5 & 6 Geo. 5. c. xv	Doncaster Corporation Act 1915	The whole Act except sections 1, 39 and 142 and Schedule 2.
11 & 12 Geo. 5. c. lxx	Ministry of Health Provisional Orders Confirmation (No. 7) Act 1921	In the Schedule, Article 10(6) and (7) of the Doncaster Order 1921.
12 & 13 Geo. 5. c. lxxii	Doncaster Corporation Act 1922	The whole Act except sections 1, 34, 64 and 109.
SR&O 1922/449	Doncaster Corporation Light Railways (Extension) Order 1922	The whole order.
14 & 15 Geo. 5. c. lxxxi	Ministry of Health Provisional Orders Confirmation (No. 9) Act 1924	In the Schedule, the Doncaster Order 1924.
15 & 16 Geo. 5. c. lxxxiv	Ministry of Health Provisional Orders Confirmation (No. 8) Act 1925	In the Schedule, the Adwick-le-Street Order 1925.
16 & 17 Geo. 5. c. xxvii	Doncaster Corporation Act 1926	The whole act.
16 & 17 Geo. 5. c. lviii	Ministry of Health Provisional Orders Confirmation (No. 9) Act 1926	In the Schedule, Article 25 of the Thorne and District Water Order 1926.
19 & 20 Geo. 5. c. xxvi	Doncaster Corporation (Trolley Vehicles) Order Confirmation Act 1929	The whole act.
20 & 21 Geo. 5. c. cxlv	Ministry of Health Provisional Orders Confirmation (Doncaster, Saint Ives (Cornwall) and Scarborough) Act 1930	In the Schedule, the Doncaster Order 1930.
21 & 22 Geo. 5. c. lvii	Doncaster Corporation Act 1931	The whole Act except sections 1, 5, 8, 10, 33, 41 and 146.
26 Geo. 5 & 1 Edw. 8. c. xlvii	Doncaster Corporation (Trolley Vehicles) Order Confirmation Act 1936	The whole act.
9 Geo. 6. c. iii	Ministry of Health Provisional Order Confirmation (Doncaster) Act 1945	In the Schedule, Article 2 of the Doncaster Order 1945.
14 Geo. 6. c. xl	Doncaster Corporation Act 1950	The whole Act except sections 1, 62, 137 and 144.
SI 1953/1348	Doncaster Corporation Trolley Vehicles (Increase of Charges) Order 1953	The whole order.
4 Eliz. 2. c. vi	Doncaster Corporation (Trolley Vehicles) Order Confirmation Act 1955	The whole act.
5 & 6 Eliz. 2. c. xxvi	Doncaster Corporation (Trolley Vehicles) Order Confirmation Act 1957	The whole act.
SI 1960/624	Don Valley Water Board Order 1960	The whole Order except Article 13 as it applies to the water undertaking of the former Isle of Axholme Rural District Council.
10 & 11 Eliz. 2. c. xxiv	Ministry of Housing and Local Government Provisional Order Confirmation (Doncaster) Act 1962	The whole act.
SI 1962/1924	Doncaster and District Joint Water Board Order 1962	Articles 3 and 27.
SI 1962/1924	Doncaster and District Joint Water Board Order 1962	In Schedule 1, Part I.
SI 1962/1924	Doncaster and District Joint Water Board Order 1962	Schedule 2.
SI 1963/599	Doncaster and District Joint Water Board Order 1963	The whole order.
SI 1963/1736	Doncaster and District Joint Water Board (No. 2) Order 1963	The whole order.
1970 c. viii	Doncaster Corporation Act 1970	The whole act.
Group 3 - Rotherham
41 Geo. 3. c. lxvi	Rotherham Market and Improvement Act 1801	The whole act.
9 & 10 Vict. c. ccxcv	Wath-upon-Dearne Improvement Act 1846	The whole act.
15 & 16 Vict. c. 42	First Public Health Supplemental Act 1852	Sections 2, 3 and 9.
15 & 16 Vict. c. 42	First Public Health Supplemental Act 1852	In the Schedule, the order relating to Rotherham and Kimberworth.
18 & 19 Vict. c. xxxii	Rotherham Gaslight Act 1855	The whole act.
26 & 27 Vict. c. cxvii	Rotherham and Kimberworth Local Board of Health Act 1863	The whole Act except— (a) sections 1, 2 and 13 to 20; (b) section 88 from “The Board” to “such markets and fairs”; (c) sections 89, 110 and 112.
33 & 34 Vict. c. cxxxiv	Rotherham and Kimberworth Local Board of Health Act 1870	The whole act.
38 & 39 Vict. c. lxx	Rotherham Corporation Act 1875	The whole act.
40 & 41 Vict. c. xxiv	Rotherham Corporation Act 1877	The whole act.
42 & 43 Vict. c. li	Rawmarsh Local Board Act 1879	The whole Act except sections 1, 9 and 14 and the Schedule.
42 & 43 Vict. c. cxci	Rotherham Borough Extension and Sewerage Act 1879	Sections 2 to 4, 6 to 18, 21 to 27, 29 to 35, 37 to 41, 43 to 49, 53, 56, 57, 66 to 75, 77 to 80 and 82 to 145.
42 & 43 Vict. c. cxci	Rotherham Borough Extension and Sewerage Act 1879	Schedules 1 to 4.
43 & 44 Vict. c. clxxviii	Local Government Board’s Provisional Orders Confirmation (Bethesda &c.) Act 1880	In the Schedule, the order relating to Rotherham.
44 & 45 Vict. c. lxi	Local Government Board’s Provisional Orders Confirmation (Berwick-upon-Tweed &c.) Act 1881	In the Schedule, the order relating to Swinton.
44 & 45 Vict. c. cxlv	Rotherham, Parkgate and Rawmarsh Tramways Act 1881	The whole act.
44 & 45 Vict. c. clxii	Local Government Board’s Provisional Orders Confirmation (Acton &c.) Act 1881	Section 3.
44 & 45 Vict. c. clxii	Local Government Board’s Provisional Orders Confirmation (Acton &c.) Act 1881	In the Schedule, the order relating to Wath-upon-Dearne.
45 & 46 Vict. c. ccxxxvii	Rotherham Corporation Act 1882	The whole act.
48 & 49 Vict. c. cxxviii	Local Government Board’s Provisional Orders Confirmation (No. 6) Act 1885	In the Schedule, the order relating to Swinton.
51 & 52 Vict. c. lxii	Local Government Board’s Provisional Orders Confirmation (No. 4) Act 1888	Section 2.
51 & 52 Vict. c. lxii	Local Government Board’s Provisional Orders Confirmation (No. 4) Act 1888	In the Schedule, Article 2 of the order relating to Rawmarsh.
53 & 54 Vict. c. lxxxiv	Local Government Board’s Provisional Orders Confirmation (No. 5) Act 1890	In the Schedule, the Rotherham Order 1890.
55 & 56 Vict. c. cc	Local Government Board’s Provisional Orders Confirmation (No. 9) Act 1892	In the Schedule, the order relating to Rawmarsh.
59 & 60 Vict. c. xxvi	Rotherham Corporation Act 1896	The whole Act except sections 1, 4, 6, 13 and 14 and Schedule 1.
61 & 62 Vict. c. xxxviii	Electric Lighting Orders Confirmation (No. 2) Act 1898	In the Schedule, the Rawmarsh Electric Lighting Order 1898 except Articles 1, 2, 15 and 16, and the Rotherham Corporation Electric Lighting Order 1898 except Articles 1, 2, 15 and 16.
62 & 63 Vict. c. xxxv	Electric Lighting Orders Confirmation (No. 2) Act 1899	In the Schedule, the Wath-upon-Dearne Electric Lighting Order 1899 except Articles 1, 2, 15 and 16.
62 & 63 Vict. c. cix	Local Government Board’s Provisional Orders Confirmation (No. 3) Act 1899	In the Schedule, the Rotherham Rural Order 1899.
62 & 63 Vict. c. cx	Local Government Board’s Provisional Orders Confirmation (No. 5) Act 1899	In the Schedule, the Rotherham Order 1899.
62 & 63 Vict. c. cxxxv	Electric Lighting Orders Confirmation (No. 10) Act 1899	In the Schedule, the Swinton Electric Lighting Order 1899 except Articles 1, 2, 15 and 16.
63 & 64 Vict. c. cxxxv	Rawmarsh Urban District Council (Tramways) Act 1900	The whole Act except sections 1, 3, 26, 27 and section 49(6), (8) to (11) and (14).
63 & 64 Vict. c. cliii	Rotherham Corporation Act 1900	The whole Act except sections 1, 2, 4, 61 and 62 and Schedule 4.
63 & 64 Vict. c. clxxii	Gas Orders Confirmation (No. 3) Act 1900	The whole act.
2 Edw. 7. c. lxx	Local Government Board’s Provisional Orders Confirmation (No. 1) Act 1902	In the Schedule, the Rotherham Order 1902.
2 Edw. 7. c. ccx	Local Government Board’s Provisional Orders Confirmation (No. 12) Act 1902	In the Schedule, the Borough of Rotherham Order (No. 2).
3 Edw. 7. c. cxxxii	Gas Orders Confirmation (No. 1) Act 1903	In the Schedule, the Conisbrough Gas Order 1903.
4 Edw. 7. c. ccxxxii	Rotherham Corporation Act 1904	The whole Act except sections 1, 154 and 197.
5 Edw. 7. c. lxx	Local Government Board’s Provisional Orders Confirmation (No. 3) Act 1905	In the Schedule, the Swinton Order 1905.
8 Edw. 7. c. lx	Swinton and Mexborough Gas Act 1908	The whole act.
8 Edw. 7. c. xciii	Wath and Bolton Gas Board Act 1908	The whole Act except sections 1, 3 and 34 and Schedule 3.
9 Edw. 7. c. lxvi	Swinton and Mexborough Gas Board Act 1909	The whole act.
10 Edw. 7 & 1 Geo. 5. c. lxxxiv	Local Government Board’s Provisional Orders Confirmation (No. 7) Act 1910	In the Schedule, the Rotherham Order 1910 and the Rotherham Order (No. 2) 1910.
1 & 2 Geo. 5. c. cxvi	Rotherham Corporation Act 1911	The whole Act except sections 1, 4, 46, 52, 94 and 100.
2 & 3 Geo. 5. c. clii	Gas Orders Confirmation (No. 1) Act 1912	In the Schedule, the Conisbrough Gas Order 1912.
3 & 4 Geo. 5. c. xxiii	Local Government Board’s Provisional Orders Confirmation (No. 1) Act 1913	In the Schedule, the Kiveton Park Rural Order 1913.
4 & 5 Geo. 5. c. lxv	Tramways Order Confirmation Act 1914	The whole act.
4 & 5 Geo. 5. c. cxxxi	Local Government Board’s Provisional Orders Confirmation (No. 10) Act 1914	In the Schedule, the Rotherham Order (No. 1) 1914.
5 & 6 Geo. 5. c. lii	Rotherham Corporation Act 1915	The whole act.
6 & 7 Geo. 5. c. xxxvi	Local Government Board’s Provisional Orders Confirmation (No. 7) Act 1916	In the Schedule, the Swinton and Mexborough Gas Order 1916.
8 & 9 Geo. 5. c. xxxvii	Rotherham Corporation Act 1918	The whole Act except sections 1, 4, 41 and 43.
9 & 10 Geo. 5. c. xlvii	Rotherham Corporation Act 1919	The whole act.
9 & 10 Geo. 5. c. cxvi	Swinton and Mexborough Gas Board Act 1919	The whole Act except sections 1 and 13(5) and (7).
10 & 11 Geo. 5. c. cxi	Ministry of Health Provisional Orders Confirmation (No. 4) Act 1920	In the Schedule, the Rotherham Rural Order 1920.
11 & 12 Geo. 5. c. lxiii	Ministry of Health Provisional Orders Confirmation (No. 9) Act 1921	In the Schedule, the Rotherham Rural Order 1921.
11 & 12 Geo. 5. c. lxxxvi	Rotherham Corporation Act 1921	The whole act.
13 & 14 Geo. 5. c. xxvii	Rawmarsh Urban District Council Act 1923	The whole act.
13 & 14 Geo. 5. c. xxxviii	Ministry of Health Provisional Orders Confirmation (No. 5) Act 1923	In the Schedule, the Rotherham Order 1923.
SR&O 1923/749	Rotherham Gas (Charges) Order 1923	The whole order.
14 & 15 Geo. 5. c. lxix	Rotherham Corporation Act 1924	The whole Act except sections 1, 4, 32, 47 to 49 and 125.
16 & 17 Geo. 5. c. liii	Ministry of Health Provisional Orders Confirmation (No. 4) Act 1926	In the Schedule, the Rotherham Order 1926.
17 & 18 Geo. 5. c. liv	Rotherham Corporation (Trolley Vehicles) Order Confirmation Act 1927	The whole act.
18 & 19 Geo. 5. c. cxi	Rotherham Corporation Act 1928	The whole Act except sections 1, 4, 34(1), 38, 56 and 130.
20 & 21 Geo. 5. c. clxxvi	Rotherham Corporation Act 1930	The whole Act except sections 1, 4, 18, 20, 77 and 103.
SR&O 1930/115	Rawmarsh Gas Order 1930	The whole order.
SR&O 1930/170	Rawmarsh Gas (Charges) Order 1930	The whole order.
21 & 22 Geo. 5. c. liii	Rotherham Rural District Council Act 1931	The whole act.
21 & 22 Geo. 5. c. lxxii	Public Works Facilities Scheme (Rotherham Corporation) Confirmation Act 1931	The whole act.
SR&O 1932/507	Rotherham Gas Order 1932	The whole order.
SR&O 1932/958	Rotherham Gas (No. 2) Order 1932	The whole Order except Articles 1, 3, 10 and 14 and Schedule 4.
23 & 24 Geo. 5. c. lxiv	Ministry of Health Provisional Order Confirmation (Wath, Swinton and District Joint Hospital District) Act 1933	The whole act.
24 & 25 Geo. 5. c. lxxi	Rotherham Corporation (Trolley Vehicles) Order Confirmation Act 1934	The whole act.
1 Edw. 8 & 1 Geo. 6. c. lxxx	Rotherham Corporation Act 1937	The whole Act except sections 1, 4, 22, 28, 71 and 94 and Schedule 3.
1 & 2 Geo. 6. c. lxxvii	Ministry of Health Provisional Order Confirmation (Rawmarsh) Act 1938	The whole act.
9 & 10 Geo. 6. c. liv	Rotherham Corporation Act 1946	The whole Act except sections 1, 4, 25 to 28 and 50 and Schedule 1.
SI 1954/1450	Rotherham (Repeal of Local Enactments) Order 1954	The whole order.
8 & 9 Eliz. 2. c. xxiv	Mexborough and Swinton Traction Act 1960	The whole Act except sections 1(1) and 5(1).
SI 1962/485	Rotherham Corporation Water Order 1962	The whole order.
1965 c. xviii	Ministry of Housing and Local Government Provisional Order Confirmation (Rotherham) Act 1965	The whole act.
Group 4 - Sheffield
28 & 29 Vict. c. 41	Local Government Supplemental Act 1865 (No. 3)	In the Schedule, the order relating to Sheffield.
30 & 31 Vict. c. 65	Local Government Supplemental Act 1867 (No. 2)	In the Schedule, the order relating to Sheffield.
31 & 32 Vict. c. lxxxvi	Local Government Supplemental Act 1868 (No. 5)	In the Schedule, the order relating to Sheffield.
57 & 58 Vict. c. xcvii	Swinton Local Board Act 1894	Section 6.
59 & 60 Vict. c. ci	Local Government Board’s Provisional Orders Confirmation (No. 6) Act 1896	In the Schedule, the Stocksbridge Order 1896.
59 & 60 Vict. c. cxc	Sheffield Corporation Water Act 1896	The whole act.
62 & 63 Vict. c. cclxix	Derwent Valley Water Act 1899	Sections 165 to 168 and 170 to 177.
1 Edw. 7. c. lxxx	Derwent Valley Water Act 1901	Section 30.
4 Edw. 7. c. cxcvi	Derwent Valley Water Act 1904	Section 42.
7 Edw. 7. c. xciii	Sheffield Corporation Act 1907	The whole act.
9 Edw. 7. c. lxiii	Derwent Valley Water Act 1909	Section 20.
1 & 2 Geo. 5. c. xviii	Swinton Urban District Council Act 1911	Section 17.
4 & 5 Geo. 5. c. xliii	Mexborough Urban District Council Act 1914	The whole act.
8 & 9 Geo. 5. c. lxi	Sheffield Corporation (Consolidation) Act 1918	Section 3.
8 & 9 Geo. 5. c. lxi	Sheffield Corporation (Consolidation) Act 1918	Section 5 as it applies to enactments concerning lands, railways, waterworks, electric lighting and town police.
8 & 9 Geo. 5. c. lxi	Sheffield Corporation (Consolidation) Act 1918	Sections 6 to 36, 38 to 40, 118 to 135, 138 to 156, 158 to 161, 164 to 173, 175 to 182, 184, 188, 190 to 197 and 199 to 211.
8 & 9 Geo. 5. c. lxi	Sheffield Corporation (Consolidation) Act 1918	Section 213 from “Provided that” to “Power Company:”.
8 & 9 Geo. 5. c. lxi	Sheffield Corporation (Consolidation) Act 1918	Sections 214, 216 and 218 to 220.
8 & 9 Geo. 5. c. lxi	Sheffield Corporation (Consolidation) Act 1918	Section 225(1) and (2) as they apply to slaughterhouses and abattoirs, and section 225(3).
8 & 9 Geo. 5. c. lxi	Sheffield Corporation (Consolidation) Act 1918	Sections 226, 229 to 234, 238, 240 to 274, 277, 278, 279, 282, 284, 287 to 294, 297 to 300, 302 to 305, 307 to 311, 313, 318 to 320, 322 to 324, 326 to 336, 338, 339, 341 to 355, 357 to 361, 363, 365 to 372, 374 to 389, 391, 396 to 412, 414 to 416, 419 to 452, 454 to 476, 483, 484, 486 to 490, 492 to 500, 503, 505, 508 to 531, 533 and 534.
8 & 9 Geo. 5. c. lxi	Sheffield Corporation (Consolidation) Act 1918	Schedules 1 to 13.
9 & 10 Geo. 5. c. xlix	Sheffield Corporation Act 1919	The whole Act except sections 1, 2, 4 and 17 to 21.
10 & 11 Geo. 5. c. lxxiv	Dearne Valley Water Act 1920	Sections 25 and 29.
10 & 11 Geo. 5. c. xcii	Sheffield Corporation Act 1920	The whole act.
11 & 12 Geo. 5. c. lxii	Ministry of Health Provisional Orders Confirmation (No. 6) Act 1921	In the Schedule, the Sheffield Order 1921.
11 & 12 Geo. 5. c. lxix	Ministry of Health Provisional Orders Confirmation (Sheffield Extension) Act 1921	The whole act.
13 & 14 Geo. 5. c. lxiii	Ministry of Health Provisional Orders Confirmation (No. 9) Act 1923	In the Schedule, the Sheffield (Water &c.) Order 1923.
13 & 14 Geo. 5. c. xcix	Chesterfield Corporation Act 1923	Section 130(6).
14 & 15 Geo. 5. c. xvi	Ministry of Health Provisional Orders Confirmation (No. 4) Act 1924	In the Schedule, the Sheffield Order 1924.
14 & 15 Geo. 5. c. lxxxi	Ministry of Health Provisional Orders Confirmation (No. 9) Act 1924	In the Schedule, the Sheffield Order (No. 2) 1924.
15 & 16 Geo. 5. c. xxxvi	Sheffield Corporation Act 1925	The whole act.
15 & 16 Geo. 5. c. lxxxi	Ministry of Health Provisional Orders Confirmation (No. 5) Act 1925	In the Schedule, the Sheffield (Compulsory Purchase of Lands) Order 1925.
15 & 16 Geo. 5. c. lxxxv	Ministry of Health Provisional Orders Confirmation (No. 9) Act 1925	In the Schedule, the Sheffield Order 1925.
16 & 17 Geo. 5. c. lv	Ministry of Health Provisional Orders Confirmation (No. 6) Act 1926	In the Schedule, the Sheffield Order 1926.
17 & 18 Geo. 5. c. xxxvii	Ministry of Health Provisional Orders Confirmation (No. 8) Act 1927	In the Schedule, the Sheffield Order 1927.
17 & 18 Geo. 5. c. xxxviii	Ministry of Health Provisional Orders Confirmation (No. 9) Act 1927	In the Schedule, the Sheffield (Acquisition of Lands) Order 1927.
17 & 18 Geo. 5. c. xliii	Sheffield Corporation Tramways Order Confirmation Act 1927	The whole act.
18 & 19 Geo. 5. c. liii	Ministry of Health Provisional Orders Confirmation (No. 5) Act 1928	In the Schedule, the Mexborough Order 1928.
18 & 19 Geo. 5. c. lxxxvii	Sheffield Corporation Act 1928	The whole Act except sections 1, 2, 4, 38, 76, 92, 98, 121, 122 and 269.
22 & 23 Geo. 5. c. xv	Sheffield Corporation Act 1932	The whole act.
23 & 24 Geo. 5. c. xix	Ministry of Health Provisional Order Confirmation (Sheffield) Act 1933	The whole act.
23 & 24 Geo. 5. c. lxx	Sheffield Extension Act 1933	The whole act.
25 & 26 Geo. 5. c. xliv	Sheffield Corporation Tramways Order Confirmation Act 1935	The whole act.
1 Edw. 8 & 1 Geo. 6. c. xxxi	Sheffield Corporation Act 1937	The whole Act except sections 1, 2, 4, 34 and 92.
1 & 2 Geo. 6. c. lxxiii	Ministry of Health Provisional Order Confirmation (Wath-upon-Dearne) Act 1938	The whole act.
SR&O 1938/1596	County of York, West Riding and County Borough of Sheffield (Alteration of Boundaries) Order 1938	The whole order.
2 & 3 Geo. 6. c. ciii	Sheffield Corporation Act 1939	Sections 3, 5 to 26, 32(1)(2)(4) and (5), 33(2) and (4), 42, 45, 47, 49, 66 to 71, 73 and 75 to 82.
2 & 3 Geo. 6. c. ciii	Sheffield Corporation Act 1939	Schedules 1 and 2.
11 & 12 Geo. 6. c. xxxi	Ministry of Health Provisional Order Confirmation (Sheffield) Act 1948	The whole act.
SI 1956/1454	Sheffield Water Order 1956	The whole Order except Articles 1, 2 and 9.
SI 1956/1455	Sheffield Water (Charges etc.) Order 1956	The whole order.
SI 1957/1153	Dearne Valley Water Board Order 1957	Article 6.
SI 1957/1153	Dearne Valley Water Board Order 1957	Schedule 2.
SI 1958/1383	Sheffield Water Order 1958	Articles 3, 4 and 6.
SI 1958/1383	Sheffield Water Order 1958	Schedule 2.
SI 1961/231	Sheffield Water Order 1961	Article 4.
SI 1961/231	Sheffield Water Order 1961	Article 14(2) to (5), and (14), as they apply to the British Railways Board.
SI 1961/231	Sheffield Water Order 1961	The Schedule.
SI 1962/478	Sheffield Water (Regrouping) Order 1962	Articles 13 and 15(2).
SI 1962/478	Sheffield Water (Regrouping) Order 1962	Schedules 1, 4 and 6.
SI 1962/1249	Sheffield (Amendment of Local Enactment) Order 1962	The whole order.
SI 1963/572	Sheffield Water (Dearne Valley) Order 1963	Articles 12, 13(1) and 14(2).
SI 1963/572	Sheffield Water (Dearne Valley) Order 1963	Schedule 1.
SI 1963/660	North Derbyshire Water Board Order 1962	Articles 4 to 13, 15, 17 to 20, 21(1), (3) and (4), 22, 23, 26(2) and (3) and 27 to 47.
SI 1963/660	North Derbyshire Water Board Order 1962	In Schedule 1, Part II.
SI 1963/660	North Derbyshire Water Board Order 1962	Schedules 3, 5 and 6.
SI 1964/670	Sheffield Water Order 1964	Article 4.
SI 1964/670	Sheffield Water Order 1964	Article 10(2) to (5), and (14), as they apply to the British Railways Board.
SI 1964/670	Sheffield Water Order 1964	The Schedule.
SI 1966/133	Sheffield Water Order 1966	The whole order.
SI 1966/1116	Sheffield Water (No. 2) Order 1966	The whole order.
SI 1967/104	Sheffield Order 1967	The whole order.
SI 1969/489	North Derbyshire Water Board (Charges) Order 1969	The whole order.
1971 c. iii	Ministry of Housing and Local Government Provisional Orders Confirmation (Melton Mowbray and Sheffield) Act 1971	In the Schedule, the Sheffield Order 1970.
SI 1971/25	Decimal Currency (Amendment of Local Enactments etc.) Order 1971	Article 31.
SI 1974/644	Sheffield Water (Wentworth Estate) Order 1974	Articles 5 and 7 to 15.
Group 5 - West Riding Enactments
56 & 57 Vict. c. cxxxii	Local Government Board’s Provisional Orders Confirmation (No. 16) Act 1893	In the Schedule, the order relating to Rivers of the West Riding of Yorkshire.
57 & 58 Vict. c. clxvi	West Riding of Yorkshire Rivers Act 1894	The whole act.
1 Edw. 7. c. cxvi	Yorkshire Electric Power Act 1901	Sections 2, 3, 5 to 29, 31 to 42, 45, 47 to 49, 52 to 60 and 62 to 75.
1 Edw. 7. c. cxvi	Yorkshire Electric Power Act 1901	Schedule 2.
10 Edw. 7 & 1 Geo. 5. c. xxi	Yorkshire Electric Power Act 1910	The whole act.
4 & 5 Geo. 5. c. lxxxv	Yorkshire Electric Power Act 1914	The whole act.
8 & 9 Geo. 5. c. viii	Yorkshire Electric Power Act 1918	The whole act.
12 & 13 Geo. 5. c. xxiii	Yorkshire Electric Power Act 1922	The whole act.
17 & 18 Geo. 5. c. xxv	Yorkshire Electric Power Act 1927	The whole act.
26 Geo. 5 & 1 Edw. 8. c. xxxi	Yorkshire Electric Power Act 1936	The whole act.
SR&O 1936/1127	Doncaster, Rotherham and Wakefield Extension Order 1936	The whole order.
1 & 2 Geo. 6. c. c	West Yorkshire Gas Distribution Act 1938	The whole Act except sections 1, 4, 71 and 73 to 75.
9 & 10 Geo. 6. c. lvi	West Yorkshire Gas Distribution Act 1946	The whole Act except sections 1(1) and 6 and the Schedule.
11 & 12 Geo. 6. c. lii	West Riding County Council (General Powers) Act 1948	The whole act.
14 & 15 Geo. 6. c. xliii	West Riding County Council (General Powers) Act 1951	The whole act.
1964 c. xxxix	West Riding County Council (General Powers) Act 1964	The whole act.
1970 c. xxv	West Riding County Council Act 1970	The whole act.

==== Part X: Transport ====
Part X — Transport
Citation	Short title	Extent of repeal
51 Geo. 3. c. ccv	Eynesford Road Act 1811	The whole act.
1 & 2 Will. 4. c. 22	London Hackney Carriage Act 1831	Section 4.
1 & 2 Will. 4. c. 22	London Hackney Carriage Act 1831	In section 56, the words “any officer of stamp duties, or”.
5 & 6 Will. 4. c. 50	Highway Act 1835	Section 5, except the definition of “highways”, and in that definition the words “(not being county bridges)”.
5 & 6 Will. 4. c. 50	Highway Act 1835	Section 22.
5 & 6 Will. 4. c. 50	Highway Act 1835	Section 78 from the beginning to “accepted) or”; and from “in case such driver” onwards.
5 & 6 Will. 4. c. 50	Highway Act 1835	Section 112.
6 & 7 Vict. c. 86	London Hackney Carriages Act 1843	Section 2, except the definition of “proprietor”.
30 & 31 Vict. c. 127	Railway Companies Act 1867	Section 2 from “Except” to “provided”.
30 & 31 Vict. c. 127	Railway Companies Act 1867	In section 3, the definitions of “share” and “Gazette”.
30 & 31 Vict. c. 134	Metropolitan Streets Act 1867	In section 3, the definition of “Magistrate” and the words “and the liberties thereof”, wherever occurring.
30 & 31 Vict. c. 134	Metropolitan Streets Act 1867	Section 27 from the beginning to “Metropolitan Police”.
31 & 32 Vict. c. 119	Regulation of Railways Act 1868	Sections 27 and 28 as they apply to Great Britain.
31 & 32 Vict. c. 119	Regulation of Railways Act 1868	Schedule 1.
32 & 33 Vict. c. 115	Metropolitan Public Carriage Act 1869	In sections 2 and 9, the words “and the liberties thereof”.
32 & 33 Vict. c. 115	Metropolitan Public Carriage Act 1869	Section 13 from “in the manner” onwards.
36 & 37 Vict. c. 48	Regulation of Railways Act 1873	In section 3, the definition of “mails”.
36 & 37 Vict. c. 76	Railway Regulation Act (Returns of Signal Arrangements, Workings, &c.) 1873	The whole act.
38 & 39 Vict. c. cxc	Channel Tunnel Company (Limited) Act 1875	The whole act.
40 & 41 Vict. c. 60	Canal Boats Act 1877	The whole act.
51 & 52 Vict. c. 25	Railway and Canal Traffic Act 1888	Section 43(3).
51 & 52 Vict. c. 25	Railway and Canal Traffic Act 1888	Section 49.
51 & 52 Vict. c. 25	Railway and Canal Traffic Act 1888	Section 53.
59 & 60 Vict. c. 48	Light Railways Act 1896	Section 26(1), (9) and (10).
59 & 60 Vict. c. 48	Light Railways Act 1896	In Schedule 2— (a) in the entry relating to the Regulation of Railways Act 1868, the words “nineteen” and “twenty-seven, twenty-eight”; (b) the entry relating to the Railway Regulation Act (Returns of Signal Arrangements, Workings, &c.) 1873.
9 & 10 Geo. 5. c. 38	Merchant Shipping (Wireless Telegraphy) Act 1919	The whole Act as it applies to the Isle of Man.
10 & 11 Geo. 5. c. 72	Roads Act 1920	Section 4.
10 & 11 Geo. 5. c. 72	Roads Act 1920	Schedule 1.
22 & 23 Geo. 5. c. 9	Merchant Shipping (Safety and Load Line Conventions) Act 1932	The following provisions as they apply to the Isle of Man— (a) Part I, except sections 12, 24, 27, 29 and 30; (b) Section 71.
24 & 25 Geo. 5. c. 50	Road Traffic Act 1934	The whole act.
1 Edw. 8 & 1 Geo. 6. c. 5	Trunk Roads Act 1936	The whole act.
9 & 10 Geo. 6. c. 30	Trunk Roads Act 1946	The whole act.
11 & 12 Geo. 6. c. 44	Merchant Shipping Act 1948	Sections 1 to 4, as they apply to the Isle of Man.
12, 13 & 14 Geo. 6. c. 32	Special Roads Act 1949	The whole act.
12, 13 & 14 Geo. 6. c. 91	Air Corporations Act 1949	The whole Act as it applies to the Isle of Man.
14 Geo. 6. c. 24	Highways (Provision of Cattle Grids) Act 1950	The whole act.
4 & 5 Eliz. 2. c. 67	Road Traffic Act 1956	The whole act.
8 & 9 Eliz. 2. c. 63	Road Traffic and Roads Improvement Act 1960	The whole act.
1963 c. 33	London Government Act 1963	In section 9(6), the words “the Road Traffic and Roads Improvement Act 1960”.
1963 c. 33	London Government Act 1963	Section 15.
1963 c. 33	London Government Act 1963	Schedule 5.
1965 c. 36	Gas Act 1965	In Schedule 2, as it applies to Scotland, paragraphs 7(3)(c) and 12(1)(c).
1968 c. 4	Erskine Bridge Tolls Act 1968	Section 12(1) from “Without prejudice” to “1949”.
1968 c. 73	Transport Act 1968	Section 143.
1968 c. 73	Transport Act 1968	Schedule 15.
1972 c. 11	Superannuation Act 1972	In Schedule 4, the entry relating to the Channel Tunnel Planning Council.
1972 c. 70	Local Government Act 1972	In Schedule 21, paragraph 96.
1980 c. 66	Highways Act 1980	In sections 219(4)(i) and 329(4), the words from “the National Freight Corporation” to “this Act”.
1980 c. 66	Highways Act 1980	In Schedule 23, paragraphs 15 and 24.
1984 c. 27	Road Traffic Regulation Act 1984	In Schedule 10, paragraph 12.
1984 c. 54	Roads (Scotland) Act 1984	In Schedule 11, the entry relating to the Gas Act 1965.
1985 c. 67	Transport Act 1985	In Schedule 8, the entry relating to the Town Police Clauses Act 1847.

==== Part XI: Miscellaneous ====
Part XI — Miscellaneous
Citation	Short title	Extent of repeal
1424 (c. 25)	Innkeepers Act 1424	The whole act.
1579 (c. 8)	Sunday Act 1579	The whole act.
1661 (c. 281)	Sunday Act 1661	The whole act.
35 Geo. 3. c. 103	Painshill Estate Act 1795	The whole act.
25 & 26 Vict. c. 34	Portsdown Fair Act 1862	The whole act.
44 & 45 Vict. c. 59	Statute Law Revision and Civil Procedure Act 1881	The whole act.
51 & 52 Vict. c. 3	Statute Law Revision Act 1888	The whole act.
51 & 52 Vict. c. 57	Statute Law Revision (No. 2) Act 1888	The whole act.
52 & 53 Vict. c. 30	Board of Agriculture Act 1889	In Part II of Schedule 1, the headings “Tithe Rentcharge Acts” and “Copyhold Acts” and the entries under those headings.
6 Edw. 7. c. 14	Alkali, &c. Works Regulation Act 1906	In section 27(1), as it applies to England and Wales, the definition of “the Public Health Act”.
6 Edw. 7. c. 14	Alkali, &c. Works Regulation Act 1906	Section 30.
10 Edw. 7 & 1 Geo. 5. c. 23	Companies (Converted Societies) Act 1910	The whole act.
15 & 16 Geo. 5. c. 88	Coastguard Act 1925	Section 3(2).
16 & 17 Geo. 5. c. 36	Parks Regulation (Amendment) Act 1926	In section 1, the proviso.
22 & 23 Geo. 5. c. 51	Sunday Entertainments Act 1932	In section 4, the words “1625 to”.
22 & 23 Geo. 5. c. 51	Sunday Entertainments Act 1932	In section 5, the definitions of “contravention” and “Sunday Observance Acts 1625 to 1780”.
9 & 10 Geo. 6. c. 26	Emergency Laws (Transitional Provisions) Act 1946	The whole act.
10 & 11 Geo. 6. c. 41	Fire Services Act 1947	Sections 27(6), 30(7), and 31(2) and (3).
10 & 11 Geo. 6. c. 41	Fire Services Act 1947	Section 39(3).
10 & 11 Geo. 6. c. 41	Fire Services Act 1947	Schedule 5.
11 & 12 Geo. 6. c. 29	National Assistance Act 1948	Section 31 as it applies to Scotland.
10 & 11 Eliz. 2. c. 24	National Assistance Act 1948 (Amendment) Act 1962	The whole act.
1964 c. 15	Defence (Transfer of Functions) Act 1964	Section 1(3)(c) and the preceding “or”.
1968 c. 46	Health Services and Public Health Act 1968	In Schedule 4, the entries relating to— (a) sections 31 and 33 of the National Assistance Act 1948; (b) the National Assistance Act 1948 (Amendment) Act 1962.
1970 c. 40	Agriculture Act 1970	Section 113(3).
1970 c. 40	Agriculture Act 1970	Schedule 5.
1972 c. 70	Local Government Act 1972	Section 112(4) from “to public analysts” to “1984 or”.
1973 c. 65	Local Government (Scotland) Act 1973	Section 64(5)(b).
1975 c. 4	Biological Standards Act 1975	Section 3.
1980 c. 28	Iran (Temporary Powers) Act 1980	The whole act.
1983 c. 2	Representation of the People Act 1983	In Schedule 7, paragraphs 3 and 6.
1983 c. 2	Representation of the People Act 1983	In Schedule 8, paragraph 16.
1984 c. 30	Food Act 1984	In Schedule 10, paragraph 22.
1985 c. 50	Representation of the People Act 1985	Section 18(1).
1985 c. 50	Representation of the People Act 1985	In Schedule 4, paragraph 90.
1986 c. 61	Education (No. 2) Act 1986	In Schedule 4, paragraph 7.
1987 c. 19	Billiards (Abolition of Restrictions) Act 1987	The whole act.

== Subsequent developments ==
Paragraph 13 was repealed by section 17(2) of, and part I of schedule 2 to, the British Technology Group Act 1991, which came into force on 6 January 1992.

Paragraph 3 of schedule 2 to the act was repealed by section 73(3) of, and part I of schedule 6 to, the Justices of the Peace Act 1997, which came into force on 19 June 1997 .

Paragraph 7 was repealed by section 423 of, and part V of schedule 34 to, the Greater London Authority Act 1999, which came into force on 3 July 2000.

Paragraph 4 of schedule 2 to the act was repealed by section 109(3) of, and schedule 10 to, the Courts Act 2003, which came into force on 8 March 2005.

== See also ==
- Statute Law (Repeals) Act

== Bibliography ==
- Halsbury's Statutes. Fourth Edition. 2008 Reissue. Volume 41. Page 891.
- Peter Allsop (Editor emeritus). Scottish Current Law Statutes Annotated 1989. Sweet and Maxwell, Stevens & sons. London. W Green & son. Edinburgh. 1990. Volume 4.
- HL Deb vol 508, cols 945 and 1266 to 1268, vol 509, col 966, vol 510, col 263, HC Deb vol 159, col 1290.
