= Duchy of Lancaster Act 1779 =

Act of the Parliament of Great Britain

Duchy of Lancaster Act 1779 (Note: The citation of this act by this short title was authorised by section 5 of, and the second schedule to, the Statute Law Revision Act 1948. Due to the repeal of those provisions, it is now authorised by section 19(2) of the Interpretation Act 1978.)
- Act of Parliament
- Parliament of Great Britain
- Long title: An Act to enable the Chancellor and Council of the Duchy of Lancaster to sell and dispose of Fee-farm Rents and other Rents and to enfranchise Copyhold and Customary Tenements within their Survey and to encourage the Growth of Timber on Lands held of the said Duchy. (Note: These words are printed against this act in the second column of the second schedule to the Statute Law Revision Act 1948, which is headed "Title".)
- Citation: 19 Geo. 3. c. 45
- Territorial extent: Great Britain

Dates
- Royal assent: 18 May 1779
- Commencement: 26 November 1778 (Note: Start of session.)

Other legislation
- Amends: Duchy of Cornwall Act 1670; Fee Farm Rents Act 1670; Crown Lands Act 1702
- Amended by: Duchy of Lancaster Act 1787; Statute Law (Repeals) Act 1989

Status: Amended

Text of statute as originally enacted

Revised text of statute as amended

Text of the Duchy of Lancaster Act 1779 as in force today (including any amendments) within the United Kingdom, from legislation.gov.uk.

The Duchy of Lancaster Act 1779 (19 Geo. 3. c. 45) is an act of the Parliament of Great Britain.

As of 2026, the act is partly in force in Great Britain.

== Subsequent developments ==
The following enactments were repealed by section 1(1) of, and group 3 part VI of schedule 1 to, the Statute Law (Repeals) Act 1989, which came into force on 16 November 1989.

- Sections 4 and 6
- Section 7 from "and also" to "for ever"
- Sections 8, 9 and 11
- Section 12 so far as it related to assurances for enfranchisement
- Section 13 from "or by the enfranchisement" to "hereditaments"
