= Mexborough Power Station =

Disused power station in South Yorkshire, England

- Country: England
- Location: South Yorkshire, Yorkshire and the Humber
- Coordinates: 53.493734°N 1.26359°W
- Status: Decommissioned and demolished
- Construction began: 1943
- Commission date: 1945
- Decommission date: October 1981
- Owners: Yorkshire Electric Power Company (1939–1948); British Electricity Authority (1948–1955); Central Electricity Authority (1955–1957); Central Electricity Generating Board (1958–1981)
- Operator: As owner

Thermal power station
- Primary fuel: Coal
- Chimneys: 4
- Cooling towers: 2

Power generation
- Units operational: 4 × 30 MW
- Units decommissioned: All
- Nameplate capacity: 120 MW
- Annual net output: 318 GWh (1972)

Mexborough Power Station was a coal-fired power station situated on the banks of the River Don, on the border of Mexborough and Denaby, adjoining Doncaster Road, in South Yorkshire, England.

== History ==
The plant was planned by the Yorkshire Electric Power Company in 1939 but construction was delayed by the war. The station became operational in 1945.

== Plant ==
The site housed four English Electric generating sets of approximately 30 MW each, giving the station a total generating capacity of 120 megawatts (MW). Two of the sets were installed in January to September 1945 and generated at 10.5 kV, and the other two were installed in July to September 1957 and generated at 11.8 kV.

There were four Mitchell stoker-fired boilers and four Richardson Westgarth boilers. The boilers had the combined capacity to produce 1,260,000 lb/h (158.8 kg/s) of steam at 600 psi (41.4 bar) and 454 °C.

There were four substantial chimneys giving this local landmark its distinctive appearance.

There were two Mitchell cooling towers with a total capacity of 2.68 million gallons per hour (12.2 million litres per hour). Make up condensing water was abstracted from the river.

The electricity generating capacity and output of the power station is shown in the table.

Mexborough electricity capacity, output and efficiency
| Year | 1946 | 1947 | 1948 | 1950 | 1954 | 1955 | 1956 | 1957 | 1958 | 1961 | 1962 | 1963 | 1967 | 1971 | 1979 |
|---|---|---|---|---|---|---|---|---|---|---|---|---|---|---|---|
| Installed capacity, MW | 59.9 | 60.8 | 57 | 57 | 57 | 57 | 57 | 57 | 113 | 120 | 120 | 120 | 120 | 120 | 120 |
| Electricity output, GWh | 315.725 | 322.345 | 365.263 | 319.857 | 253.330 | 225.878 | 188.909 | 251.654 | 352.217 | 495.882 | 409.275 | 394.316 | 327.81 | 317.941 | 25.59 |
| Thermal efficiency, % | 24.83 | 25.40 | 25.42 | 25.38 | 23.93 | 23.73 | 23.25 | 22.74 | 23.85 | 22.62 | 21.94 | 21.85 | 21.86 | 21.02 | 17.01 |
| Running hours | | | 8782 | 8739 | 7543 | 7600 | 5486 | 6812 | 7539 | | | | | | |

== Closure ==
The power station closed on 26 October 1981, with a generating capacity of 113 MW. The station was demolished in 1988. The demolition of the station sparked local interest when one of the giant chimneys was toppled accidentally and fell across the site, prematurely demolishing much of it. Contamination at the site was a concern.

== The site today ==
The site today is the Shimmer housing estate, areas of which were proposed to be demolished to make way for a 62 feet (19 m) high viaduct as part of a new railway infrastructure dubbed HS2, which was intended to make commuting times to London faster. Many homes were purchased by HS2 with residents being left in negative equity. However, in November 2021 it was confirmed by the Government that the 'Eastern Leg' of HS2 would not be constructed, with the line terminating at East Midlands Parkway, ultimately meaning that the compulsory purchasing of homes on the Shimmer estate was not required.

== See also ==
- Blackburn Meadows power station
- Rotherham power station
