= Templeborough Power Station =

Biomass power station

- Official name: Templeborough biomass power plant
- Country: England
- Location: Rotherham, South Yorkshire
- Coordinates: 53.422191°N 1.373291°W
- Status: Operational
- Construction began: 2015
- Commission date: 2018
- Construction cost: £150 million
- Owner: Copenhagen Infrastructure Partners
- Operator: Templeborough biomass power plant

Thermal power station
- Primary fuel: Biomass

Power generation
- Nameplate capacity: 44 MW

External links
- Website: website

Templeborough Power Station (also known as Templeborough biomass power plant) is a biomass power station situated in Templeborough on the River Don in Rotherham England. Operated by Copenhagen Infrastructure Partners, it opened in 2018 with an operating capacity of 44 megawatts.

The biomass plant is being built on the site of a former steelworks and besides the plant itself, it consists of ancillary buildings such as a pelletiser plant to convert the biomass to pellets before it is burnt. The biomass is delivered to the site by Stobart company who will maintain a presence on the site and separately at Rotherham DB Cargo UK railway sidings.

== History ==
The site occupies a tract of land that was once part of Ickles forging and ring-rolling works. The works, formerly Firth Rixson Rings, now part of Arconic, is still in operation and will be adjacent to the power plant. In 2010, planning permission was granted for a biomass power station to be constructed on the site with sale of the land completed by 2011. The original proponent of the scheme was a company known as the Brite Partnership who sold the venture to Copenhagen Infrastructure Partners for £150 million in 2015.

Since that time, the original generating power of the plant has been upgraded and the abstraction point from the River Don moved further upstream than in the original plans. The upgrading process also amends the rate of water abstracted from 25,200,000 cubic feet (715,000 m^{3}) to 33,100,000 cubic feet (937,000 m^{3}) per year. An access road has been created from the south bank of the River Don to the site via a brand new bridge. The bridge was installed in June 2016 and will aid in deliveries of biomass to the plant. The original plans had everything contained on the former Firth Rixson site which was cut in two by the River Don that runs from the west to the east through the middle of the site. The updated plans with an uprated output have necessitated a third part to the development which is located on railway sidings immediately south of the current site and across the A6178 road.

== Power plant ==
The power plant is capable of generating 44.1 megawatts (59,100 hp) of power, but will only supply 40.1 megawatts (53,800 hp) to the National Grid as it will utilise the rest of the power itself on running the station (such as drying the wood before it is burnt). The plant is designed to burn 270,000 tonnes (270,000 long tons; 300,000 short tons) of wood per year. The company's own website maintains that this is now 260,000 tonnes (260,000 long tons; 290,000 short tons) per year with a licence to process 320,000 tonnes (310,000 long tons; 350,000 short tons) through the plant.

The pelletising plant has a capacity of 520,000 tonnes (510,000 long tons; 570,000 short tons) per year and any excess biomass will be sold via the Stobart compound, with capacity for the biomass to be railed away to other users.

The plant will generate enough electricity to power 78,000 homes, thereby saving 150,000 tonnes (150,000 long tons; 170,000 short tons) of carbon dioxide from entering the atmosphere every year.

Power will be transferred to the National Grid via a 2.8-mile (4.5 km) long 33 kilovolt cable that would head west from the site and run along the adjacent A6178 road to a substation at Wincobank.

A Danish subsidiary company of Babcock & Wilcox designed and operates the plant, whilst the British construction arm of the multinational company Interserve constructed the plant and ancillaries. The British company Stobart collects, processes and delivers the biomass to the power plant site after stripping and debarking. Most of the biomass is intended to be waste wood collected from the local area which will add 40 lorry journeys daily to the surrounding roads. There was an aspiration that some of the waste material would arrive at the Stobart compound in Rotherham by rail transport or that excess pellets created from the wood pelletising process would be railed away from the site, but this is not mentioned in the 2015/2016 documentation. The Stobart site for the biomass project is located on the DB Cargo UK rail sidings situated just south of the biomass plant.
