= List of acts of the Parliament of the United Kingdom from 1915 =

This is a complete list of acts of the Parliament of the United Kingdom for the year 1915.

Note that the first parliament of the United Kingdom was held in 1801; parliaments between 1707 and 1800 were either parliaments of Great Britain or of Ireland). For acts passed up until 1707, see the list of acts of the Parliament of England and the list of acts of the Parliament of Scotland. For acts passed from 1707 to 1800, see the list of acts of the Parliament of Great Britain. See also the list of acts of the Parliament of Ireland.

For acts of the devolved parliaments and assemblies in the United Kingdom, see the list of acts of the Scottish Parliament, the list of acts of the Northern Ireland Assembly, and the list of acts and measures of Senedd Cymru; see also the list of acts of the Parliament of Northern Ireland.

The number shown after each act's title is its chapter number. Acts passed before 1963 are cited using this number, preceded by the year(s) of the reign during which the relevant parliamentary session was held; thus the Union with Ireland Act 1800 is cited as "39 & 40 Geo. 3 c. 67", meaning the 67th act passed during the session that started in the 39th year of the reign of George III and which finished in the 40th year of that reign. Note that the modern convention is to use Arabic numerals in citations (thus "41 Geo. 3" rather than "41 Geo. III"). Acts of the last session of the Parliament of Great Britain and the first session of the Parliament of the United Kingdom are both cited as "41 Geo. 3". Acts passed from 1963 onwards are simply cited by calendar year and chapter number.

== 5 & 6 Geo. 5 ==
Continuing the fifth session of the 30th Parliament of the United Kingdom, which met from 11 November 1914 until 27 January 1916.

This session was also traditionally cited as 5 & 6 G. 5.

=== Public general acts ===
| Short title | Citation | Royal assent |
Long title
| British Ships (Transfer Restriction) Act 1915 (repealed) | 5 & 6 Geo. 5. c. 21 | 16 March 1915 |
An Act to restrict the transfer of British Ships to Persons not qualified to own British Ships. (Repealed by Statute Law Revision Act 1927 (17 & 18 Geo. 5. c. 42))
| Universities and Colleges (Emergency Powers) Act 1915 (repealed) | 5 & 6 Geo. 5. c. 22 | 16 March 1915 |
An Act to amend the Universities and College Estates Acts, and to extend the powers of the Universities of Oxford and Cambridge and the Colleges therein to make statutes, for purposes connected with the present War. (Repealed by Statute Law Revision Act 1927 (17 & 18 Geo. 5. c. 42))
| Army (Suspension of Sentences) Act 1915 (repealed) | 5 & 6 Geo. 5. c. 23 | 16 March 1915 |
An Act to authorise the suspension of sentences of penal servitude and imprisonment passed on soldiers engaged in active service beyond the seas during the present war. (Repealed by Army and Air Force (Annual) Act 1920 (10 & 11 Geo. 5. c. 7))
| Injuries in War (Compensation) Act 1915 (repealed) | 5 & 6 Geo. 5. c. 24 | 16 March 1915 |
An Act to provide for the grant of pensions and other allowances to certain persons in respect of disablement due to causes arising out of the operations of the present war, whilst they are employed afloat in connexion with the telegraph and postal services, and to their dependants, and for purposes connected therewith. (Repealed by Post Office Act 1969 (c. 48))
| Army (Annual) Act 1915 (repealed) | 5 & 6 Geo. 5. c. 25 | 16 March 1915 |
An Act to provide, during Twelve Months, for the Discipline and Regulation of the Army. (Repealed by Statute Law Revision Act 1927 (17 & 18 Geo. 5. c. 42))
| Army (Amendment) Act 1915 (repealed) | 5 & 6 Geo. 5. c. 26 | 16 March 1915 |
An Act to amend the Army Act. (Note: Army Act 1881 (44 & 45 Vict. c. 58)) (Repealed by Statute Law Revision Act 1927 (17 & 18 Geo. 5. c. 42) and Revision of the Army and Air Force Acts (Transitional Provisions) Act 1955 (3 & 4 Eliz. 2. c. 20))
| National Insurance (Part II. Amendment) Act 1915 (repealed) | 5 & 6 Geo. 5. c. 27 | 16 March 1915 |
An Act to enable contributions to be made for the purpose of Part II. of the National Insurance Act, 1911, (Note: National Insurance Act 1911 (1 & 2 Geo. 5. c. 55)) by workmen employed abroad in insured trades on work connected with or arising out of the present War. (Repealed by Unemployment Insurance Act 1920 (10 & 11 Geo. 5. c. 30))
| Naval Medical Compassionate Fund Act 1915 (repealed) | 5 & 6 Geo. 5. c. 28 | 16 March 1915 |
An Act to make further and better provision with regard to the Naval Medical Compassionate Fund. (Repealed by Armed Forces Act 2011 (c. 18))
| National Insurance (Part I. Amendment) Act 1915 (repealed) | 5 & 6 Geo. 5. c. 29 | 16 March 1915 |
An Act to amend Part I. of the National Insurance Act, 1911. (Repealed by National Health Insurance Act 1924 (14 & 15 Geo. 5. c. 38))
| Naval Discipline Act 1915 (repealed) | 5 & 6 Geo. 5. c. 30 | 16 March 1915 |
An Act to amend the Naval Discipline Act. (Note: Naval Discipline Act 1866 (29 & 30 Vict. c. 109)) (Repealed by Naval Discipline Act 1957 (5 & 6 Eliz. 2. c. 53))
| Customs (War Powers) Act 1915 (repealed) | 5 & 6 Geo. 5. c. 31 | 16 March 1915 |
An Act to amend the enactments relating to Customs during the present War. (Repealed by Statute Law Revision Act 1927 (17 & 18 Geo. 5. c. 42))
| Irish Police (Naval and Military Service) Act 1915 (repealed) | 5 & 6 Geo. 5. c. 32 | 16 March 1915 |
An Act to authorise the grant of certain pensions and other allowances in respect of Members of the Royal Irish Constabulary and Dublin Metropolitan Police who are Reservists or join the Naval or Military Forces and for other purposes incidental thereto. (Repealed by Police (Northern Ireland) Act 1998 (c. 32))
| Consolidated Fund (No. 2) Act 1915 (repealed) | 5 & 6 Geo. 5. c. 33 | 16 March 1915 |
An Act to apply certain sums out of the Consolidated Fund to the service of the years ending on the thirty-first day of March one thousand nine hundred and fourteen, one thousand nine hundred and fifteen, and one thousand nine hundred and sixteen. (Repealed by Statute Law Revision Act 1927 (17 & 18 Geo. 5. c. 42))
| Defence of the Realm (Amendment) Act 1915 (repealed) | 5 & 6 Geo. 5. c. 34 | 16 March 1915 |
An Act to amend the Defence of the Realm Consolidation Act, 1914. (Note: Defence of the Realm Consolidation Act 1914 (5 & 6 Geo. 5. c. 8)) (Repealed by Statute Law Revision Act 1927 (17 & 18 Geo. 5. c. 42))
| Naval Marriages Act 1915 (repealed) | 5 & 6 Geo. 5. c. 35 | 16 March 1915 |
An Act to provide further facilities for the marriage of officers, seamen, and marines borne on the books of any of His Majesty's ships during the continuance of the present war. (Repealed by Statute Law Revision Act 1927 (17 & 18 Geo. 5. c. 42))
| Legal Proceedings against Enemies Act 1915 (repealed) | 5 & 6 Geo. 5. c. 36 | 16 March 1915 |
An Act to facilitate Legal Proceedings against Enemies in certain cases. (Repealed by Statute Law Revision Act 1927 (17 & 18 Geo. 5. c. 42))
| Defence of the Realm (Amendment), No. 2, Act 1915 (repealed) | 5 & 6 Geo. 5. c. 37 | 16 March 1915 |
An Act to amend the Defence of the Realm Consolidation Act, 1914. (Repealed by Statute Law Revision Act 1927 (17 & 18 Geo. 5. c. 42))
| Copyright (British Museum) Act 1915 (repealed) | 5 & 6 Geo. 5. c. 38 | 19 May 1915 |
An Act to amend the Copyright Act, 1911, (Note: Copyright Act 1911 (1 & 2 Geo. 5. c. 46)) with respect to the delivery of books to the British Museum. (Repealed by British Museum Act 1932 (22 & 23 Geo. 5. c. 34))
| Fugitive Offenders (Protected States) Act 1915 (repealed) | 5 & 6 Geo. 5. c. 39 | 19 May 1915 |
An Act to enable the Fugitive Offenders Act, 1881, (Note: Fugitive Offenders Act 1881 (44 & 45 Vict. c. 69)) to be extended to Protected States. (Repealed by Fugitive Offenders Act 1967 (c. 68))
| Marriage of British Subjects (Facilities) Act 1915 | 5 & 6 Geo. 5. c. 40 | 19 May 1915 |
An Act to facilitate Marriages between British Subjects resident in the United Kingdom and British Subjects resident in other parts of His Majesty's Dominions or in British Protectorates. (Repealed for Scotland by Marriage (Scotland) Act 1977 (c. 15))
| Police (Emergency Provisions) Act 1915 (repealed) | 5 & 6 Geo. 5. c. 41 | 19 May 1915 |
An Act to amend the enactments relating to the Police during the present War. (Repealed by Police Pensions Act 1948 (11 & 12 Geo. 6. c. 24))
| Defence of the Realm (Amendment) (No. 3) Act 1915 (repealed) | 5 & 6 Geo. 5. c. 42 | 19 May 1915 |
An Act to extend the Defence of the Realm Consolidation Act, 1914. (Repealed for England and Wales and Scotland by Licensing Act 1921 (11 & 12 Geo. 5. c. 42) and for Northern Ireland by Statute Law Revision Act 1953 (2 & 3 Eliz. 2. c. 5))
| Army (Transfers) Act 1915 (repealed) | 5 & 6 Geo. 5. c. 43 | 19 May 1915 |
An Act to amend section eighty-three of the Army Act with respect to transfers during the present War. (Repealed by Statute Law Revision Act 1927 (17 & 18 Geo. 5. c. 42))
| Statutory Companies (Redeemable Stock) Act 1915 | 5 & 6 Geo. 5. c. 44 | 19 May 1915 |
An Act to enable certain Statutory Companies to create and issue Preference Shares or Stock, and Debentures or Debenture Stock, so as in each case to be redeemable.
| British North America Act 1915 known in Canada as the Constitution Act, 1915 | 5 & 6 Geo. 5. c. 45 | 19 May 1915 |
An Act to amend the British North America Act, 1867. (Note: British North America Act 1867 (30 & 31 Vict. c. 3))
| Immature Spirits (Restriction) Act 1915 (repealed) | 5 & 6 Geo. 5. c. 46 | 19 May 1915 |
An Act to restrict the Supply and Sale of Immature Spirits. (Repealed by Customs and Excise Act 1952 (15 & 16 Geo. 6 & 1 Eliz. 2. c. 44))
| Special Constables (Scotland) Act 1915 (repealed) | 5 & 6 Geo. 5. c. 47 | 19 May 1915 |
An Act to amend the Law relating to the appointment of Special Constables in Scotland. (Repealed by Statute Law Revision Act 1927 (17 & 18 Geo. 5. c. 42))
| Fishery Harbours Act 1915 (repealed) | 5 & 6 Geo. 5. c. 48 | 19 May 1915 |
An Act to make, provision for facilitating the improvement, management, and maintenance of small harbours principally used by the fishing industry. (Repealed by Transport and Works Act 1992 (c. 42))
| Housing (Rosyth Dockyard) Act 1915 (repealed) | 5 & 6 Geo. 5. c. 49 | 19 May 1915 |
An Act to facilitate the early provision of dwellings, &c. for, or for the convenience of, persons employed by or on behalf of the Admiralty at Rosyth Dockyard. (Repealed by Statute Law (Repeals) Act 1977 (c. 18))
| Re-election of Ministers Act 1915 (repealed) | 5 & 6 Geo. 5. c. 50 | 4 June 1915 |
An Act to make temporary provision for rendering unnecessary the Re-election of Members of the House of Commons on Acceptance of Office. (Repealed by Statute Law Revision Act 1927 (17 & 18 Geo. 5. c. 42))
| Ministry of Munitions Act 1915 (repealed) | 5 & 6 Geo. 5. c. 51 | 9 June 1915 |
An Act for establishing, in connection with the present War, a Ministry of Munitions of War, and for purposes incidental thereto. (Repealed by Statute Law Revision Act 1927 (17 & 18 Geo. 5. c. 42))
| Customs (Exportation Restriction) Act 1915 (repealed) | 5 & 6 Geo. 5. c. 52 | 24 June 1915 |
An Act to amend the Law relating to the Exportation of Articles during the present War. (Repealed by Statute Law Revision Act 1927 (17 & 18 Geo. 5. c. 42))
| Consolidated Fund (No. 3) Act 1915 (repealed) | 5 & 6 Geo. 5. c. 53 | 24 June 1915 |
An Act to apply a sum out or the Consolidated Fund to the service of the year ending on the thirty-first day of March one thousand nine hundred and sixteen. (Repealed by Statute Law Revision Act 1927 (17 & 18 Geo. 5. c. 42))
| Munitions of War Act 1915 (repealed) | 5 & 6 Geo. 5. c. 54 | 2 July 1915 |
An Act to make provision for furthering the efficient manufacture, transport, and supply of Munitions for the present War; and for purposes incidental thereto. (Repealed for the United Kingdom by Munitions of War (Amendment) Act 1916 (5 & 6 Geo. 5. c. 99), Wages (Temporary Regulation) Act 1918 (8 & 9 Geo. 5. c. 61) and Restoration of Pre-War Practices Act 1919 (9 & 10 Geo. 5. c. 42) and for the Isle of Man by Statute Law (Repeals) Act 2004 (c. 14))
| War Loan Act 1915 (repealed) | 5 & 6 Geo. 5. c. 55 | 2 July 1915 |
An Act to make further provision for raising Money for the present War, and for purposes incidental thereto. (Repealed by National Debt Act 1958 (7 & 8 Eliz. 2. c. 6))
| War Loan (Trustees) Act 1915 (repealed) | 5 & 6 Geo. 5. c. 56 | 2 July 1915 |
An Act to enable Trustees to borrow money for the purpose of exercising any Option to convert Securities given under the War Loan Act, 1915, (Note: War Loan Act 1915 (5 & 6 Geo. 5. c. 55)) to Holders of that Loan, and to indemnify Trustees for any Loss in respect of any such borrowing, or any transaction in relation to the Loan, and to authorise the investment of moneys subject to any trust in any Securities created under that Act. (Repealed by Statute Law Revision Act 1964 (c. 79))
| Prize Courts Act 1915 | 5 & 6 Geo. 5. c. 57 | 2 July 1915 |
An Act to amend the Enactments relating to Prize Courts.
| Army (Amendment) No. 2 Act 1915 (repealed) | 5 & 6 Geo. 5. c. 58 | 2 July 1915 |
An Act to amend the Army Act. (Repealed by Statute Law Revision Act 1927 (17 & 18 Geo. 5. c. 42) and Revision of the Army and Air Force Acts (Transitional Provisions) Act 1955 (3 & 4 Eliz. 2. c. 20))
| Milk and Dairies Acts Postponement Act 1915 (repealed) | 5 & 6 Geo. 5. c. 59 | 2 July 1915 |
An Act to postpone the operation of the Milk and Dairies Act, 1914, (Note: Milk and Dairies Act 1914 (4 & 5 Geo. 5. c. 49)) and the Milk and Dairies (Scotland) Act, 1914. (Note: Milk and Dairies (Scotland) Act 1914 (4 & 5 Geo. 5. c. 46)) (Repealed for England and Wales by Milk and Dairies (Consolidation) Act 1915 (5 & 6 Geo. 5. c. 66) and for Scotland by Milk and Dairies (Amendment) Act 1922 (12 & 13 Geo. 5. c. 54))
| National Registration Act 1915 (repealed) | 5 & 6 Geo. 5. c. 60 | 15 July 1915 |
An Act for the compilation of a National Register. (Repealed by Statute Law Revision Act 1927 (17 & 18 Geo. 5. c. 42))
| Government of India Act 1915 (repealed) | 5 & 6 Geo. 5. c. 61 | 29 July 1915 |
An Act to consolidate enactments relating to the Government of India. (Repealed by Government of India Act 1935 (26 Geo. 5 & 1 Edw. 8. c. 2))
| Finance Act 1915 (repealed) | 5 & 6 Geo. 5. c. 62 | 29 July 1915 |
An Act to grant certain duties of Customs and Inland Revenue, including Excise, to alter other duties and to amend the Law relating to Customs and Inland Revenue, including Excise, and the National Debt, and to make further provision in connection with Finance. (Repealed by Statute Law (Repeals) Act 1971 (c. 52))
| Expiring Laws Continuance Act 1915 (repealed) | 5 & 6 Geo. 5. c. 63 | 29 July 1915 |
An Act to continue various Expiring Laws. (Repealed by Statute Law Revision Act 1927 (17 & 18 Geo. 5. c. 42))
| Notification of Births (Extension) Act 1915 (repealed) | 5 & 6 Geo. 5. c. 64 | 29 July 1915 |
An Act to extend the Notification of Births Act, 1907, (Note: Notification of Births Act 1907 (7 Edw. 7. c. 40)) to Areas, in which it has not been adopted, and to make further provision in connection therewith for the Care of Mothers and Young Children. (Repealed by Statute Law (Repeals) Act 1993 (c. 50))
| Maintenance of Live Stock Act 1915 (repealed) | 5 & 6 Geo. 5. c. 65 | 29 July 1915 |
An Act to make provision for securing the Maintenance of a sufficient Stock of Cattle, Sheep, and Swine, and for purposes connected therewith. (Repealed by Statute Law Revision Act 1927 (17 & 18 Geo. 5. c. 42))
| Milk and Dairies (Consolidation) Act 1915 (repealed) | 5 & 6 Geo. 5. c. 66 | 29 July 1915 |
An Act to consolidate certain Enactments relating to Milk and Dairies. (Repealed by Food and Drugs Act 1938 (1 & 2 Geo. 6. c. 56))
| Isle of Man (Customs) Act 1915 (repealed) | 5 & 6 Geo. 5. c. 67 | 29 July 1915 |
An Act to amend the Law with respect to Customs in the Isle of Man. (Repealed by Statute Law Revision Act 1927 (17 & 18 Geo. 5. c. 42))
| Public Works Loans Act 1915 (repealed) | 5 & 6 Geo. 5. c. 68 | 29 July 1915 |
An Act to grant Money for the purpose of certain Local Loans out of the Local Loans Fund, and for other purposes relating to Local Loans. (Repealed by Statute Law Revision Act 1927 (17 & 18 Geo. 5. c. 42))
| Cotton Associations (Emergency Action) Act 1915 (repealed) | 5 & 6 Geo. 5. c. 69 | 29 July 1915 |
An Act to confirm Action taken by any Cotton Association for dealing with Emergencies due to the present War. (Repealed by Statute Law Revision Act 1927 (17 & 18 Geo. 5. c. 42))
| Execution of Trusts (War Facilities) Amendment Act 1915 (repealed) | 5 & 6 Geo. 5. c. 70 | 29 July 1915 |
An Act to amend and extend the provisions of the Execution of Trusts (War Facilities) Act, 1914. (Note: Execution of Trusts (War Facilities) Act 1914 (5 & 6 Geo. 5. c. 13)) (Repealed by Statute Law Revision Act 1927 (17 & 18 Geo. 5. c. 42))
| Customs (War Powers) (No. 2) Act 1915 (repealed) | 5 & 6 Geo. 5. c. 71 | 29 July 1915 |
An Act to extend the Customs (War Powers) Act, 1915. (Note: Customs (War Powers) Act 1915 (5 & 6 Geo. 5. c. 31)) (Repealed by Statute Law Revision Act 1927 (17 & 18 Geo. 5. c. 42))
| Special Acts (Extension of Time) Act 1915 (repealed) | 5 & 6 Geo. 5. c. 72 | 29 July 1915 |
An Act to give temporary power to Government Departments to extend the time limited for the performance of duties or the exercise of powers under special Acts. (Repealed by Statute Law Revision Act 1927 (17 & 18 Geo. 5. c. 42))
| Naval Discipline (No. 2) Act 1915 (repealed) | 5 & 6 Geo. 5. c. 73 | 29 July 1915 |
An Act to amend the Naval Discipline Act. (Repealed by Naval Discipline Act 1957 (5 & 6 Eliz. 2. c. 53))
| Police Magistrates (Superannuation) Act 1915 (repealed) | 5 & 6 Geo. 5. c. 74 | 29 July 1915 |
An Act to amend the Law with respect to the Superannuation Allowances payable to the Metropolitan Police Magistrates, the Dublin Divisional Justices and the Stipendiary Magistrate for Chatham and Sheerness. (Repealed by Administration of Justice Act 1973 (c. 15))
| Price of Coal (Limitation) Act 1915 or the Coal Prices Limitation Act 1915 (repealed) | 5 & 6 Geo. 5. c. 75 | 29 July 1915 |
An Act to provide for the limitation of the Price of Coal. (Repealed by Mining Industry Act 1920 (10 & 11 Geo. 5. c. 50))
| Elections and Registration Act 1915 (repealed) | 5 & 6 Geo. 5. c. 76 | 29 July 1915 |
An Act to postpone Elections of local authorities and other bodies and the preparation of the Parliamentary and Local Government Registers, and for purposes incidental thereto. (Repealed by Statute Law Revision Act 1927 (17 & 18 Geo. 5. c. 42))
| Appropriation Act 1915 (repealed) | 5 & 6 Geo. 5. c. 77 | 29 July 1915 |
An Act to apply a sum out of the Consolidated Fund to the service of the year ending on the thirty-first day of March one thousand nine hundred and sixteen, and to appropriate the Supplies granted in this Session of Parliament. (Repealed by Statute Law Revision Act 1927 (17 & 18 Geo. 5. c. 42))
| Scottish Universities (Emergency Powers) Act 1915 (repealed) | 5 & 6 Geo. 5. c. 78 | 29 July 1915 |
An Act to extend the powers of the Scottish Universities to make Ordinances for purposes connected with the present War. (Repealed by Statute Law Revision Act 1927 (17 & 18 Geo. 5. c. 42))
| Trading with the Enemy Amendment Act 1915 (repealed) | 5 & 6 Geo. 5. c. 79 | 29 July 1915 |
An Act to amend the Trading with the Enemy Acts, 1914. (Note: Trading with the Enemy Act 1914 (4 & 5 Geo. 5. c. 87)) (Note: Trading with the Enemy Amendment Act 1914 (5 & 6 Geo. 5. c. 12)) (Repealed by Trading with the Enemy Act 1939 (2 & 3 Geo. 6. c. 89))
| Consolidated Fund (No. 4) Act 1915 (repealed) | 5 & 6 Geo. 5. c. 80 | 29 September 1915 |
An Act to apply a sum out of the Consolidated Fund to the service of the year ending on the thirty-first day of March one thousand nine hundred and sixteen (Repealed by Statute Law Revision Act 1927 (17 & 18 Geo. 5. c. 42))
| American Loan Act 1915 (repealed) | 5 & 6 Geo. 5. c. 81 | 13 October 1915 |
An Act to enable a Loan to be raised in conjunction with the French Government in the United States of America. (Repealed by Statute Law Revision Act 1953 (2 & 3 Eliz. 2. c. 5))
| Post Office and Telegraph Act 1915 (repealed) | 5 & 6 Geo. 5. c. 82 | 28 October 1915 |
An Act to alter certain statutory limits of Postal and Telegraph Rates; and for purposes connected therewith. (Repealed by Telegraph Act 1954 (2 & 3 Eliz. 2. c. 28))
| Naval and Military War Pensions, &c. Act 1915 (repealed) | 5 & 6 Geo. 5. c. 83 | 10 November 1915 |
An Act to make better provision as to the pensions, grants, and allowances made in respect of the present war to officers and men in the Naval and Military Service of His Majesty and their dependants, and the care of officers and men disabled in consequence of the present war, and for purposes connected therewith. (Repealed by Statute Law (Repeals) Act 2008 (c. 12))
| Clubs (Temporary Provisions) Act 1915 (repealed) | 5 & 6 Geo. 5. c. 84 | 10 November 1915 |
An Act to amend the Law with respect to Clubs during the continuance of the present war. (Repealed by Statute Law Revision Act 1927 (17 & 18 Geo. 5. c. 42))
| Patents and Designs Act (Partial Suspension) Act 1915 (repealed) | 5 & 6 Geo. 5. c. 85 | 23 November 1915 |
An Act to suspend the operation of section twenty-seven of the Patents and Designs Act, 1907, (Note: Patents and Designs Act 1907 (7 Edw. 7. c. 29)) during the continuance of the present war, and for a period of six months thereafter. (Repealed by Statute Law Revision Act 1927 (17 & 18 Geo. 5. c. 42))
| Appropriation (No. 2) Act 1915 (repealed) | 5 & 6 Geo. 5. c. 86 | 23 November 1915 |
An Act to apply a sum out of the Consolidated Fund to the service of the year ending on the thirty-first day of March one thousand nine hundred and sixteen, and to appropriate the Supplies granted in this Session of Parliament. (Repealed by Statute Law Revision Act 1927 (17 & 18 Geo. 5. c. 42))
| Indian Civil Service (Temporary Provisions) Act 1915 (repealed) | 5 & 6 Geo. 5. c. 87 | 23 December 1915 |
An Act to enable Persons during the continuance of the War, and for a period of two years thereafter, to be appointed or admitted to the Indian Civil Service without examination. (Repealed by Statute Law Revision Act 1927 (17 & 18 Geo. 5. c. 42))
| Street Collections Regulation (Scotland) Act 1915 (repealed) | 5 & 6 Geo. 5. c. 88 | 23 December 1915 |
An Act to provide for the Regulation of Street Collections in Burghs in Scotland. (Repealed by Local Government (Scotland) Act 1973 (c. 65))
| Finance (No. 2) Act 1915 | 5 & 6 Geo. 5. c. 89 | 23 December 1915 |
An Act to grant certain duties of Customs and Inland Revenue (including Excise), to alter other duties, and to amend the law relating to Customs and Inland Revenue (including Excise) and the National Debt, and to make further provision in connexion with Finance.
| Indictments Act 1915 | 5 & 6 Geo. 5. c. 90 | 23 December 1915 |
An Act to amend the Law relating to Indictments in Criminal Cases, and matters incidental or simian thereto.
| Midwives (Scotland) Act 1915 (repealed) | 5 & 6 Geo. 5. c. 91 | 23 December 1915 |
An Act to secure the better training of Midwives in Scotland, and to regulate their practice. (Repealed by Midwives (Scotland) Act 1951 (14 & 15 Geo. 6. c. 54))
| Judicial Committee Act 1915 | 5 & 6 Geo. 5. c. 92 | 23 December 1915 |
An Act to enable the Judicial Committee of the Privy Council to sit in more than one Division at the same time.
| War Loan (Supplemental Provisions) Act 1915 (repealed) | 5 & 6 Geo. 5. c. 93 | 23 December 1915 |
An Act to make provision, in connection with Loans raised for the purposes of the present War, for the establishment of a Post Office stock register, and as to stock inscribed in that register, and to make certain amendments, in connection with such Loans and generally in connection with War Finance, in the Law relating to Savings Banks, Friendly Societies, Trade Unions, and otherwise. (Repealed by Statute Law (Repeals) Act 1989 (c. 43))
| Evidence (Amendment) Act 1915 (repealed) | 5 & 6 Geo. 5. c. 94 | 23 December 1915 |
An Act to amend the Law of Evidence. (Repealed by Statute Law Revision Act 1927 (17 & 18 Geo. 5. c. 42) and Defence (Transfer of Functions) (No. 1) Order 1964 (SI 1964/488))
| Education (Small Population Grants) Act 1915 (repealed) | 5 & 6 Geo. 5. c. 95 | 23 December 1915 |
An Act to suspend in connection with the present War the Grants payable under paragraph (2) of section nineteen of the Elementary Education Act, 1876, (Note: Elementary Education Act 1876 (39 & 40 Vict. c. 79)) and the Education Code (1890) Act, 1890, (Note: Education Code (1890) Act 1890 (53 & 54 Vict. c. 22)) and to provide for the payment of other Grants in lieu thereof. (Repealed by Education Act 1918 (8 & 9 Geo. 5. c. 39))
| Government War Obligations Act 1915 (repealed) | 5 & 6 Geo. 5. c. 96 | 23 December 1915 |
An Act to make provision with respect to Obligations incurred by or on behalf of His Majesty's Government for the purposes of the present War or in connection therewith. (Repealed by Statute Law Revision Act 1958 (6 & 7 Eliz. 2. c. 46))
| Increase of Rent and Mortgage Interest (War Restrictions) Act 1915 or the Rent Restrictions Act 1915 (repealed) | 5 & 6 Geo. 5. c. 97 | 23 December 1915 |
An Act to restrict, in connection with the present War, the Increase of the Rent of Small Dwelling-houses and the Increase of the Rate of Interest on, and the Calling in of, Securities on such Dwelling-houses. (Repealed by Increase of Rent and Mortgage Interest (Restrictions) Act 1920 (10 & 11 Geo. 5. c. 17))
| Trading with the Enemy (Extension of Powers) Act 1915 (repealed) | 5 & 6 Geo. 5. c. 98 | 23 December 1915 |
An Act to provide for the Extension of the Restrictions relating to Trading with the Enemy to Persons to whom, though not resident or carrying on Business in Enemy Territory, it is by reason of their Enemy Nationality or Enemy Associations expedient to extend such Restriction. (Repealed by Trading with the Enemy Act 1939 (2 & 3 Geo. 6. c. 89))

=== Local acts ===
| Short title | Citation | Royal assent |
Long title
| Aberdeen Corporation Order Confirmation Act 1915 | 5 & 6 Geo. 5. c. i | 16 March 1915 |
An Act to confirm a Provisional Order under the Private Legislation Procedure (Scotland) Act 1899 (Note: Private Legislation Procedure (Scotland) Act 1899 (62 & 63 Vict. c. 47)) relating to Aberdeen Corporation.
| | Aberdeen Corporation Order 1915 Provisional Order to authorise the Corporation of the City and Royal Burgh of Aberdeen to construct additional tramways to provide and work overhead trolley vehicles and motor omnibuses and for other purposes. | |
| Local Government Board's Provisional Order Confirmation (No. 23) Act 1915 | 5 & 6 Geo. 5. c. ii | 16 March 1915 |
An Act to confirm a Provisional Order of the Local Government Board relating to Darlington.
| | Borough of Darlington Order 1914 Provisional Order made in pursuance of the Local Government Act 1888 (Note: Local Government Act 1888 (51 & 52 Vict. c. 41)) for altering a Borough and constituting a County Borough. | |
| Local Government Board's Provisional Orders Confirmation (No. 1) Act 1915 | 5 & 6 Geo. 5. c. iii | 19 May 1915 |
An Act to confirm certain Provisional Orders of the Local Government Board relating Aberavon Birkenhead Cheltenham Neath Newton in Mackerfield Ulverston and Widnes.
| | Aberavon Order 1915 Provisional Order for altering the Aberavon Local Board Act 1866 (Note: Aberavon Local Board Act 1866 (29 & 30 Vict. c. ccxl)) and the Local Government Board's Provisional Orders Confirmation (No. 14) Act 1896. (Note: Local Government Board's Provisional Orders Confirmation (No. 14) Act 1896 (59 & 60 Vict. c. cviii)) | |
| | Birkenhead Order 1915 Provisional Order for altering the Birkenhead Corporation Act 1902. (Note: Birkenhead Corporation Act 1902 (2 Edw. 7. c. lxii)) | |
| | Cheltenham Order 1915 Provisional Order for altering the Cheltenham Improvement Act 1889 (Note: Cheltenham Improvement Act 1889 (52 & 53 Vict. c. clxxxiv)) the Local Government Board's Provisional Orders Confirmation (No. 12) Act 1892 (Note: Local Government Board's Provisional Orders Confirmation (No. 12) Act 1892 (55 & 56 Vict. c. ccxxiii)) and the Local Government Board's Provisional Orders Confirmation (No. 13) Act 1898. (Note: Local Government Board's Provisional Orders Confirmation (No. 13) Act 1898 (61 & 62 Vict. c. ccxii)) | |
| | Neath Corporation Water Order 1915 Provisional Order for altering the Neath Corporation Water Act 1894 (Note: Neath Corporation Water Act 1894 (57 & 58 Vict. c. lxxxiii)) and the Local Government Board's Provisional Orders Confirmation (No. 6) Act 1908. (Note: Local Government Board's Provisional Orders Confirmation (No. 6) Act 1908 (8 Edw. 7. c. cxlvi)) | |
| | Newton in Mackerfield Order 1915 Provisional Order for altering the Newton District Improvement Act 1855 (Note: Newton District Improvement Act 1855 (18 & 19 Vict. c. c)) and the Local Government Board's Provisional Orders Confirmation (No. 2) Act 1900. (Note: Local Government Board's Provisional Orders Confirmation (No. 2) Act 1900 (63 & 64 Vict. c. liii)) | |
| | Ulverston Order 1915 Provisional Order for altering the Ulverston Local Board Act 1874 (Note: Ulverston Local Board Act 1874 (37 & 38 Vict. c. cliv)) and the Local Government Board's Provisional Orders Confirmation (No. 1) Act 1895. (Note: Local Government Board's Provisional Orders Confirmation (No. 1) Act 1895 (58 & 59 Vict. c. xl)) | |
| | Widnes Order 1915 Provisional Order for altering the Widnes Improvement Act 1867 (Note: Widnes Improvement Act 1867 (30 & 31 Vict. c. cxxvi)) and the Widnes Local Board Act 1875. (Note: Widnes Local Board Act 1875 (38 & 39 Vict. c. lxxxviii)) | |
| Caledonian Railway Order Confirmation Act 1915 | 5 & 6 Geo. 5. c. iv | 19 May 1915 |
An Act to confirm a Provisional Order under the Private Legislation Procedure (Scotland) Act 1899 relating to the Caledonian Railway.
| | Caledonian Railway Order 1915 Provisional Order to confer further powers on the Caledonian Railway Company in relation to their undertaking to confirm certain agreements entered into by the Company to stop up certain level crossings to extend the periods for the completion of certain works and for the purchase of land and to revive the powers for the purchase of lands for and for the construction of other works to empower the Cathcart District Railway Company to hold and dispose of superfluous lands and for other purposes. | |
| Liverpool Corporation Act 1915 (repealed) | 5 & 6 Geo. 5. c. v | 19 May 1915 |
An Act to empower the Corporation of the city of Liverpool to acquire further lands to extend the powers of the Corporation with respect to the leasing of corporate land and for other purposes. (Repealed by Liverpool Corporation Act 1921 (11 & 12 Geo. 5. c. lxxiv))
| London, Chatham and Dover Railway Act 1915 | 5 & 6 Geo. 5. c. vi | 19 May 1915 |
An Act to enable the London Chatham and Dover Railway Company to raise further capital and for other purposes.
| Ascot District Gas and Electricity Act 1915 | 5 & 6 Geo. 5. c. vii | 19 May 1915 |
An Act to authorise the Ascot District Gas and Electricity Company to raise additional capital and for other purposes.
| Mersey Railway Act 1915 | 5 & 6 Geo. 5. c. viii | 19 May 1915 |
An Act to amend the Mersey Railway Act 1900 (Note: Mersey Railway Act 1900 (63 & 64 Vict. c. cxxxiv)) and for other purposes.
| Royal School for Deaf and Dumb Children Margate Act 1915 | 5 & 6 Geo. 5. c. ix | 19 May 1915 |
An Act to alter the name of the President Vice-Presidents Treasurer and Governors of the Asylum for the Deaf and Dumb Poor and to enable them to acquire and hold additional lands and for other purposes.
| Ilfracombe Gas Act 1915 | 5 & 6 Geo. 5. c. x | 19 May 1915 |
An Act to confer further powers upon the Ilfracombe Gas Company and for other purposes.
| Neath Canal Navigation Act 1915 | 5 & 6 Geo. 5. c. xi | 19 May 1915 |
An Act to empower the Company of Proprietors of the Neath Canal Navigation to raise further moneys.
| Great Central Railway Act 1915 | 5 & 6 Geo. 5. c. xii | 19 May 1915 |
An Act to authorise the Great Central Railway Company to use certain lands for railway purposes to extend the time for the compulsory purchase of lands and for the completion of works to enable the Company to raise further capital and for other purposes.
| Frimley and Farnborough District Water Act 1915 | 5 & 6 Geo. 5. c. xiii | 9 June 1915 |
An Act for conferring further powers upon the Frimley and Farnborough District Water Company.
| Blyth Harbour Act 1915 | 5 & 6 Geo. 5. c. xiv | 9 June 1915 |
An Act to empower the Blyth Harbour Commissioners to construct a toll bridge over the River Blyth with approaches thereto to construct new piers or breakwaters and for other purposes.
| Doncaster Corporation Act 1915 | 5 & 6 Geo. 5. c. xv | 9 June 1915 |
An Act to authorise the Corporation of Doncaster to construct street improvements to confer upon the Corporation further powers with reference to their water and gas undertakings to make better provision for the health local government and finance of the borough of Doncaster and for other purposes.
| Great Eastern Railway Act 1915 | 5 & 6 Geo. 5. c. xvi | 9 June 1915 |
An Act for conferring further powers upon the Great Eastern Railway Company for extending the time limited by former Acts for the completion of works and the purchase of lands by the Company and for the purchase of lands by the Great Northern and Great Eastern Joint Committee and for other purposes.
| Bury and District Joint Water Board Act 1915 | 5 & 6 Geo. 5. c. xvii | 9 June 1915 |
An Act to extend the time for the compulsory purchase of lands for and completion of works authorised by the Bury and District Joint Water Board Act 1903. (Note: Bury and District Joint Water Board Act 1903 (3 Edw. 7. c. ccxxxiv))
| Salop County Council (Shirehall and Guildhall) Act 1915 | 5 & 6 Geo. 5. c. xviii | 9 June 1915 |
An Act to regulate the user of the Shirehall and Guildhall at Shrewsbury in the County of Salop and for other purposes.
| Brighton and Hove Gas Act 1915 | 5 & 6 Geo. 5. c. xix | 24 June 1915 |
An Act to extend the limits of supply of the Brighton and Hove General Gas Company and for other purposes.
| Falmouth Docks Act 1915 (repealed) | 5 & 6 Geo. 5. c. xx | 24 June 1915 |
An Act for making provisions respecting the capital of the Falmouth Docks Company and for other purposes. (Repealed by Falmouth Docks Act 1919 (9 & 10 Geo. 5. c. xxxvii))
| Ormskirk Gas and Electricity Act 1915 | 5 & 6 Geo. 5. c. xxi | 24 June 1915 |
An Act to change the name of the Ormskirk Gas Light Company to empower the Company to acquire additional lands to supply electricity and to raise additional capital and for other purposes.
| Metropolitan District Railway Act 1915 | 5 & 6 Geo. 5. c. xxii | 24 June 1915 |
An Act to make further provision respecting the capital and undertaking of the Metropolitan District Railway Company to confer further powers on the London and South Western Railway Company in respect of their Wimbledon and Fulham Railway and on the Wimbledon and Sutton Railway Company and for other purposes.
| Seaforth and Sefton Junction Railway Act 1915 | 5 & 6 Geo. 5. c. xxiii | 24 June 1915 |
An Act to enable the Seaforth and Sefton Junction Railway Company to create and issue a capital stock guaranteed by the Great Central and Great Northern Railway Companies to revive the powers and extend the time for the completion of the Seaforth and Sefton Junction Railways and for other purposes.
| Streatley and Goring Bridge Act 1915 | 5 & 6 Geo. 5. c. xxiv | 24 June 1915 |
An Act to empower the Commissioners of the Streatley and Goring Bridge and approaches to construct a new bridge and approaches across the Thames between Streatley and Goring and for other purposes.
| Bristol Tramways Act 1915 | 5 & 6 Geo. 5. c. xxv | 24 June 1915 |
An Act to revive and extend the powers for the acquisition of lands and to extend the time for the construction of certain authorised tramways of the Bristol Tramways and Carriage Company Limited and for other purposes.
| Halifax Corporation Act 1915 (repealed) | 5 & 6 Geo. 5. c. xxvi | 24 June 1915 |
An Act to confer powers on the mayor aldermen and burgesses of the county borough of Halifax for the construction of tramways to provide and run trolley vehicles and omnibuses and to make further provision with regard to their tramway undertaking and for other purposes. (Repealed by West Yorkshire Act 1980 (c. xiv))
| Sheffield Corporation (Tramways) Act 1915 (repealed) | 5 & 6 Geo. 5. c. xxvii | 24 June 1915 |
An Act to confer powers upon the lord mayor aldermen and citizens of the city of Sheffield with respect to the construction of tramways and the running of omnibuses and for other purposes. (Repealed by Sheffield Corporation (Consolidation) Act 1918 (8 & 9 Geo. 5. c. lxi))
| West Gloucestershire Water Act 1915 | 5 & 6 Geo. 5. c. xxviii | 24 June 1915 |
An Act for conferring further capital powers on the West Gloucestershire Water Company and for other purposes.
| Forfar Gas Order Confirmation Act 1915 | 5 & 6 Geo. 5. c. xxix | 24 June 1915 |
An Act to confirm a Provisional Order under the Private Legislation Procedure (Scotland) Act 1899 relating to Forfar Gas.
| | Forfar Gas Order 1915 Provisional Order to authorise the Provost Magistrates and Councillors of the Burgh. of Forfar to borrow additional money and to make further provisions and confer on them additional powers in relation to their gas undertaking and for other purposes. | |
| Great North of Scotland Railway Order Confirmation Act 1915 | 5 & 6 Geo. 5. c. xxx | 24 June 1915 |
An Act to confirm a Provisional Order under the Private Legislation Procedure (Scotland) Act 1899 relating to the Great North of Scotland Railway.
| | Great North of Scotland Railway Order 1915 Provisional Order to authorise the Great North of Scotland Railway Company to execute works and acquire lands and for other purposes. | |
| Highland Railway Order Confirmation Act 1915 | 5 & 6 Geo. 5. c. xxxi | 24 June 1915 |
An Act to confirm a Provisional Order under the Private Legislation Procedure (Scotland) Act 1899 relating to the Highland Railway.
| | Highland Railway Order 1915 Provisional Order to extend the time for the completion of certain Railways authorised by the Highland Railway (Additional Powers) Act 1897 (Note: Highland Railway (Additional Powers) Act 1897 (60 & 61 Vict. c. ccxvi)) to sanction a widening of the Highland Railway from Clachnaharry to Clunes already constructed to authorise the borrowing of further money and for other purposes. | |
| Irvine and District Water Board (Emergency Powers) Order Confirmation Act 1915 (repealed) | 5 & 6 Geo. 5. c. xxxii | 24 June 1915 |
An Act to confirm a Provisional Order under the Private Legislation Procedure (Scotland) Act 1899 relating to Irvine and District Water Board (Emergency Powers). (Repealed by Irvine and District Water Board Order 1961 (SI 1961/872))
| | Irvine and District Water Board (Emergency Powers) Order 1915 Provisional Order to authorise the Irvine and District Water Board to enter into agreements with the Corporation of Paisley for a supply of water to construct additional waterworks to borrow further moneys and for other purposes. | |
| Electric Lighting Orders Confirmation (No. 1) Act 1915 | 5 & 6 Geo. 5. c. xxxiii | 2 July 1915 |
An Act to confirm certain Provisional Orders made by the Board of Trade under the Electric Lighting Acts 1882 to 1909 relating to Clifden and Enniscorthy.
| | Clifden Electric Lighting Order 1915 Provisional Order granted by the Board of Trade under the Electric Lighting Acts 1882 to 1909 to the Rural District Council of Clifden in respect of the Townlands of Clifden Ardbear and Tullyvoheen all in the Rural District of Clifden in the County of Galway. | |
| | Enniscorthy Electric Lighting Order 1915 Provisional Order granted by the Board of Trade under the Electric Lighting Acts 1882 and 1909 to the Urban District Council of Enniscorthy in respect of the Urban District of Enniscorthy in the County of Wexford. | |
| Local Government Board's Provisional Orders Confirmation (No. 2) Act 1915 | 5 & 6 Geo. 5. c. xxxiv | 2 July 1915 |
An Act to confirm certain Provisional Orders of the Local Government Board relating to Bridlington Huddersfield St. Helens Scarborough and Skelmersdale.
| | Bridlington Order 1915 Provisional Order for altering the Bridlington Local Board Act 1889 (Note: Bridlington Local Board Act 1889 (52 & 53 Vict. c. cxxiii)) and the Bridlington Corporation Act 1904. (Note: Bridlington Corporation Act 1904 (4 Edw. 7. c. ccxxii)) | |
| | Huddersfield Order 1915 Provisional Order for altering the Huddersfield Improvement Act 1880. (Note: Huddersfield Improvement Act 1880 (43 & 44 Vict. c. xcix)) | |
| | St. Helens Order 1915 Provisional Order for altering the St. Helens Improvement Act 1869. (Note: St. Helens Improvement Act 1869 (32 & 33 Vict. c. cxx)) | |
| | Scarborough Order 1915 Provisional Order for altering the Scarborough Corporation Act 1900. (Note: Scarborough Corporation Act 1900 (63 & 64 Vict. c. cclxxix)) | |
| | Skelmersdale Order 1915 Provisional Order for altering the Southport Birkdale and West Lancashire Water Board Act 1907. (Note: Southport Birkdale and West Lancashire Water Board Act 1907 (7 Edw. 7. c. lxviii)) | |
| Local Government Board's Provisional Orders Confirmation (No. 3) Act 1915 | 5 & 6 Geo. 5. c. xxxv | 2 July 1915 |
An Act to confirm certain Provisional Orders of the Local Government Board relating to Cowes and East Cowes Milford Haven Southend-on-Sea (two) Stafford and Worthing.
| | Cowes Ferry Order 1915 Provisional Order for altering the Cowes Ferry Act 1901. (Note: Cowes Ferry Act 1901 (1 Edw. 7. c. lxxxviii)) | |
| | Milford Haven Order 1915 Provisional Order for altering the Milford Improvement Act 1857 (Note: Milford Improvement Act 1857 (20 & 21 Vict. c. lxxiv)) the Milford Improvement Act 1869 (Note: Milford Improvement Act 1869 (32 & 33 Vict. c. xcvii)) and the Local Government Board's Provisional Orders Confirmation (No. 8) Act 1900. (Note: Local Government Board's Provisional Orders Confirmation (No. 8) Act 1900 (63 & 64 Vict. c. clxxvii)) | |
| | Southend-on-Sea Order (No. 1) 1915 Provisional Order for altering the Leigh-on-Sea Urban District Council Act 1899. (Note: Leigh-on-Sea Urban District Council Act 1899 (62 & 63 Vict. c. ccxvii)) | |
| | Southend-on-Sea Order (No. 2) 1915 Provisional Order to enable the Urban Sanitary Authority for the Borough of Southend-on-Sea to put in force the Compulsory Clauses of the Lands Clauses Acts. | |
| | Stafford Order 1915 Provisional Order for partially repealing and altering the Stafford Corporation Act 1876. (Note: Stafford Corporation Act 1876 (39 & 40 Vict. c. cxcvi)) | |
| | Worthing Order 1915 Provisional Order for partially repealing and altering the West Worthing Improvement Act 1865 (Note: West Worthing Improvement Act 1865 (28 & 29 Vict. c. xxvii)) the Local Government Board's Provisional Orders Confirmation (No. 6) Act 1884 (Note: Local Government Board's Provisional Orders Confirmation (No. 6) Act 1884 (47 & 48 Vict. c. ccxii)) and the Local Government Board's Provisional Orders Confirmation (No. 14) Act 1904. (Note: Local Government Board's Provisional Orders Confirmation (No. 14) Act 1904 (4 Edw. 7. c. cxxi)) | |
| Local Government Board's Provisional Orders Confirmation (No. 4) Act 1915 | 5 & 6 Geo. 5. c. xxxvi | 2 July 1915 |
An Act to confirm certain Provisional Orders of the Local Government Board relating to Hursley (Rural) Pudsey Ruislip-Northwood and Whitley and Monkseaton.
| | Hursley Rural Order 1915 | |
| | Pudsey Order 1915 Provisional Order for altering the Local Government Board's Provisional Orders Confirmation (Eastbourne &c.) Act 1880. (Note: Local Government Board's Provisional Orders Confirmation (Eastbourne, &c.) Act 1880 (43 & 44 Vict. c. cxxxii)) | |
| | Ruislip-Northwood Order 1915 Provisional Order to enable the Urban District Council of Ruislip-Northwood to put in force the Compulsory Clauses of the Lands Clauses Acts. | |
| | Whitley and Monkseaton Order 1915 Provisional Order to enable the Urban District Council of Whitley and Monkseaton to put in force the Compulsory Clauses of the Lands Clauses Acts. | |
| Local Government Board's Provisional Order Confirmation (No. 7) Act 1915 (repealed) | 5 & 6 Geo. 5. c. xxxvii | 2 July 1915 |
An Act to confirm a Provisional Order of the Local Government Board relating to the County of Nottingham. (Repealed by Nottinghamshire County Council Act 1985 (c. xv))
| | County of Nottingham Order 1915 Provisional Order made in pursuance of subsection (2) of Section 69 of the Local Government Act 1888. | |
| Conway Fisheries Provisional Order Confirmation Act 1915 | 5 & 6 Geo. 5. c. xxxviii | 2 July 1915 |
An Act to confirm a Provisional Order under the Salmon and Freshwater Fisheries Act 1907 (Note: Salmon and Freshwater Fisheries Act 1907 (7 Edw. 7. c. 15)) relating to the River Conway and other waters.
| | River Conway Fisheries Provisional Order 1915 River Conway Fisheries Provisional Order 1915. | |
| Sea Fisheries (Cardigan Bay) Provisional Order Confirmation Act 1915 | 5 & 6 Geo. 5. c. xxxix | 2 July 1915 |
An Act to confirm a Provisional Order under the Sea Fisheries Act 1868 (Note: Sea Fisheries Act 1868 (31 & 32 Vict. c. 45)) relating to Mussel Fisheries in parts of the sea adjoining the counties of Carnarvon Merioneth and Cardigan.
| | Cardigan Bay Mussel Fishery Order 1915 Order for the Improvement Maintenance and Regulation of a Mussel Fishery in certain parts of the Sea adjoining the Counties of Carnarvon Merioneth and Cardigan. | |
| Sea Fisheries (Poole) Provisional Order Confirmation Act 1915 | 5 & 6 Geo. 5. c. xl | 2 July 1915 |
An Act to confirm a Provisional Order under the Sea Fisheries Act 1868 relating to Oyster Mussel and Cockle Fisheries in and near Poole Harbour.
| | Poole Fishery Order 1915 Order for the Regulation of an Oyster Mussel and Cockle Fishery in and near the Harbour of Poole in the County of Dorset and for the Establishment and Maintenance of a Several Oyster Mussel and Cockle Fishery in parts thereof. | |
| Tramways Orders Confirmation Act 1915 | 5 & 6 Geo. 5. c. xli | 2 July 1915 |
An Act to confirm certain Provisional Orders made by the Board of Trade under the Tramways Act 1870 (Note: Tramways Act 1870 (33 & 34 Vict. c. 78)) relating to Bury Corporation Tramways and Hull Corporation Tramways.
| | Bury Corporation Tramways Order 1915 Order authorising the Mayor Aldermen and Burgesses of the County Borough of Bury to construct additional tramways in the said borough and for other purposes. | |
| | Kingston-upon-Hull Corporation Tramways Order 1915 Order authorising the Mayor Aldermen and Citizens of the City and County of Kingston-upon-Hull to construct additional tramways in the said city and for other purposes. | |
| Altrincham Gas Act 1915 | 5 & 6 Geo. 5. c. xlii | 2 July 1915 |
An Act for conferring further powers on the Altrincham Gas Company and for providing for the raising of additional capital and for other purposes.
| Warwick Gas Act 1915 | 5 & 6 Geo. 5. c. xliii | 2 July 1915 |
An Act to continue and confer further powers upon the Town of Warwick Gas Light Company to change the name of the Company and for other purposes.
| Ammanford Urban District Council Act 1915 (repealed) | 5 & 6 Geo. 5. c. xliv | 2 July 1915 |
An Act to empower the Ammanford Urban District Council to construct street improvements and for other purposes. (Repealed by Dyfed Act 1987 (c. xxiv))
| Friends' Provident Institution Act 1915 (repealed) | 5 & 6 Geo. 5. c. xlv | 2 July 1915 |
An Act to incorporate the Friends' Provident Institution and to provide for the management of its affairs and for other purposes. (Repealed by Friends' Provident Life Office Act 1975 (c. xiv))
| Methodist Church in Ireland Act 1915 | 5 & 6 Geo. 5. c. xlvi | 2 July 1915 |
An Act to constitute and incorporate the Trustees of the Methodist Church in Ireland and to vest in them certain trust properties for the said Church and to provide for the administration of those properties and for other purposes connected therewith.
| Sunderland Corporation (Wearmouth Bridge) Act 1915 | 5 & 6 Geo. 5. c. xlvii | 2 July 1915 |
An Act to empower the mayor aldermen and burgesses of the borough of Sunderland to reconstruct the Wearmouth Bridge and for other purposes.
| Eastern Valleys (Monmouthshire) Joint Sewerage Board Act 1915 | 5 & 6 Geo. 5. c. xlviii | 15 July 1915 |
An Act to confer further powers on the Eastern Valleys (Monmouthshire) Joint Sewerage Board.
| Prescot Gas Act 1915 | 5 & 6 Geo. 5. c. xlix | 15 July 1915 |
An Act to consolidate and convert the existing shares of the Prescot Gas Company to authorise the Company to raise additional capital and for other purposes.
| Spennymoor and Tudhoe Gas Act 1915 | 5 & 6 Geo. 5. c. l | 15 July 1915 |
An Act to authorise the Spennymoor and Tudhoe Gas Company to raise additional capital and to confer further powers upon that Company.
| Skegness Urban District Gas Act 1915 | 5 & 6 Geo. 5. c. li | 15 July 1915 |
An Act to enable the Skegness Urban District Council to acquire the undertaking of the Skegness Gas Company and to confer upon the Council powers in relation to the supply of gas.
| Rotherham Corporation Act 1915 (repealed) | 5 & 6 Geo. 5. c. lii | 15 July 1915 |
An Act for conferring further powers upon the Corporation of Rotherham with reference to their tramway and electricity undertakings to authorise the construction of street works and to make better provision for the health local government and finance of the borough of Rotherham and for other purposes. (Repealed by Statute Law (Repeals) Act 1989 (c. 43))
| Chelmsford Corporation Gas Act 1915 | 5 & 6 Geo. 5. c. liii | 15 July 1915 |
An Act to provide for the transfer of the undertaking of the Chelmsford Gas Company to the mayor aldermen and burgesses of the borough of Chelmsford and to confer further powers on that corporation with respect to the supply of gas and for other purposes.
| Lurgan Urban District Council Act 1915 | 5 & 6 Geo. 5. c. liv | 15 July 1915 |
An Act to provide for the transfer of the undertaking of the Lurgan Gas Light and Chemical Company Limited to the urban district council of Lurgan to confer further powers on the Council with respect to the supply of gas electricity and water and to make further and better pro- vision for the improvement health and local government of the district and for other purposes.
| Port of London Act 1915 (repealed) | 5 & 6 Geo. 5. c. lv | 15 July 1915 |
An Act to amend the Port of London Act 1908 (Note: Port of London Act 1908 (8 Edw. 7. c. 68)) in reference to the election of elected members of the Port of London Authority. (Repealed by Port of London (Consolidation) Act 1920 (10 & 11 Geo. 5. c. clxxiii))
| Sutton District Waterworks Act 1915 (repealed) | 5 & 6 Geo. 5. c. lvi | 15 July 1915 |
An Act to authorise the Sutton District Water Company to raise further moneys and for other purposes. (Repealed by Sutton District Water Company (Constitution and Regulation) Order 1989 (SI 1989/2379))
| Aberdare Urban District Council Act 1915 | 5 & 6 Geo. 5. c. lvii | 15 July 1915 |
An Act to enable the urban district council of Aberdare to make and maintain tramways and to run trolley cars by railless traction and motor omnibuses to carry out street improvements and to confer further powers upon the Council and for other purposes.
| Northwich Gas Act 1915 | 5 & 6 Geo. 5. c. lviii | 15 July 1915 |
An Act to confer further powers on the Northwich Gas Company and for other purposes.
| Kilmarnock Gas Order Confirmation Act 1915 | 5 & 6 Geo. 5. c. lix | 15 July 1915 |
An Act to confirm a Provisional Order under the Burgh Police (Scotland) Act 1892 (Note: Burgh Police (Scotland) Act 1892 (55 & 56 Vict. c. 55)) relating to Kilmarnock Gas.
| | Kilmarnock Gas Order 1915 Kilmarnock Gas. Provisional Order. | |
| Irvine and District Water Board Order Confirmation Act 1915 (repealed) | 5 & 6 Geo. 5. c. lx | 15 July 1915 |
An Act to confirm a Provisional Order under the Private Legislation Procedure (Scotland) Act 1899 relating to Irvine and District Water Board. (Repealed by Irvine and District Water Board Order 1961 (SI 1961/872))
| | Irvine and District Water Board Order 1915 Provisional Order to authorise the Irvine and District Water Board to construct additional Waterworks to borrow further Moneys and for other purposes. | |
| Stalybridge, Hyde, Mossley and Dukinfield Tramways and Electricity Board Act 1915 | 5 & 6 Geo. 5. c. lxi | 29 July 1915 |
An Act to authorise the Stalybridge Hyde Mossley and Dukinfield Tramways and Electricity Board to construct additional tramways to extend their area for the supply of electricity and for other purposes.
| Ashington Urban District Council Act 1915 (repealed) | 5 & 6 Geo. 5. c. lxii | 29 July 1915 |
An Act to authorise the urban district council of Ashington to construct new waterworks to confer further powers on the Council in regard to their water undertaking and for other purposes. (Repealed by Tynemouth Corporation Act 1916 (6 & 7 Geo. 5. c. xli))
| South Shields Corporation Act 1915 | 5 & 6 Geo. 5. c. lxiii | 29 July 1915 |
An Act to confer further powers upon the mayor aldermen and burgesses of the county borough of South Shields in regard to their tramway undertaking to extend their Mill Dam Quay to construct street works and to acquire lands to make better provisions in regard to the electrical undertaking and the local government health and finance of the borough and for other purposes.
| Wolverhampton Corporation Water Act 1915 (repealed) | 5 & 6 Geo. 5. c. lxiv | 29 July 1915 |
An Act to empower the mayor aldermen and burgesses of the borough of Wolverhampton to construct additional waterworks to extend their limits for the supply of water and to make further provision in regard to their water undertaking and for other purposes. (Repealed by Wolverhampton Corporation Act 1969 (c. lx))
| Barnoldswick Urban District Council Water Act 1915 | 5 & 6 Geo. 5. c. lxv | 29 July 1915 |
An Act to authorise the urban district council of Barnoldswick to construct new waterworks and to acquire additional lands to confer further powers on the Council in regard to their water undertaking and for other purposes.
| Nottingham Corporation (Trent Navigation Transfer) Act 1915 | 5 & 6 Geo. 5. c. lxvi | 29 July 1915 |
An Act to transfer to the mayor aldermen and citizens of the city of Nottingham part of the undertaking of the Trent Navigation Company and for other purposes.
| Southend Waterworks Act 1915 (repealed) | 5 & 6 Geo. 5. c. lxvii | 29 July 1915 |
An Act to authorise the Southend Waterworks Company to construct new works to raise additional capital and for other purposes. (Repealed by Southend Water Order 1958 (SI 1958/1390))
| London Electric Railway Companies' Facilities Act 1915 or the London Electric and other Railway Companies' Facilities Act 1915 | 5 & 6 Geo. 5. c. lxviii | 29 July 1915 |
An Act to authorise the City and South London Railway Company the Central London Railway Company the London Electric Railway Company and the Metropolitan District Railway Company or any of them to make agreements with each other and with the London General Omnibus Company Limited for the purpose of establishing a common fund the application of such fund and other purposes.
| Plymouth Corporation Act 1915 | 5 & 6 Geo. 5. c. lxix | 29 July 1915 |
An Act to consolidate with amendments certain of the local Acts in force in the borough of Plymouth to confer further powers upon the mayor aldermen and burgesses of that borough and to make further provision in regard to the health local government and improvement of the borough and for other purposes.
| South Staffordshire Waterworks Act 1915 | 5 & 6 Geo. 5. c. lxx | 29 July 1915 |
An Act to authorise the South Staffordshire Waterworks Company to extend their limits of supply to construct new works to raise additional capital and for other purposes.
| Rhondda Urban District Council (Tramways, Extns., &c.) Act 1915 (repealed) | 5 & 6 Geo. 5. c. lxxi | 29 July 1915 |
An Act to authorise the Rhondda Urban District Council to construct additional tramways to make street improvements to confer upon the Council further powers in relation to their gas and water undertakings and for the better local government and improvement of the district and for other purposes. (Repealed by Rhondda Corporation Act 1973 (c. xxiii))
| Weardale and Consett Water Act 1915 | 5 & 6 Geo. 5. c. lxxii | 29 July 1915 |
An Act to empower the Weardale and Consett Water Company to construct additional works and for other purposes.
| Metropolitan Water Board Act 1915 | 5 & 6 Geo. 5. c. lxxiii | 29 July 1915 |
An Act to empower the Metropolitan Water Board to make waterworks and other works and to acquire lands and for other purposes.
| Dewsbury Corporation Act 1915 (repealed) | 5 & 6 Geo. 5. c. lxxiv | 29 July 1915 |
An Act to empower the mayor aldermen and burgesses of the borough of Dewsbury to construct an additional tramway to confer further powers upon them in regard to their tramway gas and electricity undertakings and with respect to the disposal of trade refuse and to make further provision for the improvement health and good government of the said borough and for other purposes. (Repealed by West Yorkshire Act 1980 (c. xiv))
| London County Council (Money) Act 1915 (repealed) | 5 & 6 Geo. 5. c. lxxv | 29 July 1915 |
An Act to regulate the expenditure on capital account and lending of money by the London County Council during the financial period from the first day of April one thousand nine hundred and fifteen to the thirtieth day of September one thousand nine hundred and sixteen and for other purposes. (Repealed by London County Council (Loans) Act 1955 (4 & 5 Eliz. 2. c. xxvi))
| London County Council (Parks, &c.) Act 1915 (repealed) | 5 & 6 Geo. 5. c. lxxvi | 29 July 1915 |
An Act to confer further powers upon the London County Council with regard to parks and open spaces and other matters to confer various powers upon metropolitan borough councils and for other purposes. (Repealed by Local Law (Greater London Council and Inner London Boroughs) Order 1965 (SI 1965/540))
| Lincoln Corporation Act 1915 | 5 & 6 Geo. 5. c. lxxvii | 29 July 1915 |
An Act to authorise the mayor aldermen and citizens of the city of Lincoln to acquire and extinguish the rights of the freemen of the city and others in or in respect of the commons in and adjoining the city and to make provision for the management thereof to provide and work trolley vehicles and motor omnibuses to make further provision with regard to the supply of gas and electricity and with regard to the health local government and improvement of the city and for other purposes.
| Port-Glasgow Gas and Burgh Order Confirmation Act 1915 | 5 & 6 Geo. 5. c. lxxviii | 29 July 1915 |
An Act to confirm a Provisional Order under the Private Legislation Procedure (Scotland) Act 1889 relating to Port-Glasgow Gas and Burgh Extension.
| | Port-Glasgow Gas and Burgh Extension Order 1915 Provisional Order to authorise the Provost Magistrates and Councillors of the burgh of Port-Glasgow to construct new gasworks and to acquire lands and to confer further powers on them in relation to their gas undertaking to extend the municipal and police boundaries of the burgh and for other purposes. | |
| Glasgow Corporation (Parks, Harbour Tunnel, Gas, &c.) Order Confirmation Act 1915 | 5 & 6 Geo. 5. c. lxxix | 29 July 1915 |
An Act to confirm a Provisional Order under the Private Legislation Procedure (Scotland) Act 1899 relating to Glasgow Corporation (Parks, Harbour Tunnel, Gas, &c.).
| | Glasgow Corporation (Parks, Harbour Tunnel, Gas, &c.) Order 1915 Provisional Order to authorise the Corporation of the city of Glasgow to purchase the Balloch Estate to take over and work the Glasgow harbour tunnel and to purchase the undertaking of the Glasgow Harbour Tunnel Company to erect a bridge in connection with their gas undertaking to borrow money and for other purposes. | |
| Dunfermline and District Tramways (Extensions) Order Confirmation Act 1915 | 5 & 6 Geo. 5. c. lxxx | 29 July 1915 |
An Act to confirm a Provisional Order under the Private Legislation Procedure (Scotland) Act 1899 relating to Dunfermline and District Tramways (Extensions).
| | Dunfermline and District Tramways (Extensions) Order 1915 Provisional Order to authorise the Dunfermline and District Tramways Company to construct additional Tramways and for other purposes. | |
| Provisional Order (Marriages) Confirmation Act 1915 (repealed) | 5 & 6 Geo. 5. c. lxxxi | 29 July 1915 |
An Act to confirm a Provisional Order made by one of His Majesty's Principal Secretaries of State under the Provisional Order (Marriages) Act 1905. (Note: Provisional Order (Marriages) Act 1905 (5 Edw. 7. c. 23)) (Repealed by Statute Law (Repeals) Act 1977 (c. 18))
| | All Saints and St. Mary Chitterne St. Mary Woodchester and St. Lawrence and All Saints Steeple with Stanesgate Order. | |
| Electric Lighting Orders Confirmation (No. 2) Act 1915 | 5 & 6 Geo. 5. c. lxxxii | 29 July 1915 |
An Act to confirm certain Provisional Orders made by the Board of Trade under the Electric Lighting Acts 1882 to 1909 relating to Haworth Urban District Irlam Kingston-upon-Hull (Extension) Knaresborough Litherland Normanton Urban District Ryde (Amendment) Skipton Stanley (Yorkshire) and Tenby.
| | Haworth Urban District Electric Lighting Order 1915 Provisional Order granted by the Board of Trade under the Electric Lighting Acts 1882 to 1909 to the Haworth Urban District Council in respect of the Urban District of Haworth in the West Riding of the County of York. | |
| | Irlam Electric Lighting Order 1915 Provisional Order granted by the Board of Trade under the Electric Lighting Acts 1882 to 1909 to the Urban District Council of Irlam in respect of the Urban District of Irlam in the County Palatine of Lancaster. | |
| | Kingston-upon-Hull Electric Lighting (Extension) Order 1915 Provisional Order granted by the Board of Trade under the Electric Lighting Acts 1882 to 1909 to the Mayor Aldermen and Citizens of the City and County of Kingston-upon-Hull in respect of the Urban District of Hessle in the East Riding of the County of York. | |
| | Knaresborough Electric Lighting Order 1915 Provisional Order granted by the Board of Trade under the Electric Lighting Acts 1882 to 1909 to the Urban District Council of Knaresborough in respect of the Urban District of Knaresborough in the West Riding of the County of York. | |
| | Litherland Electric Lighting Order 1915 Provisional Order granted by the Board of Trade under the Electric Lighting Acts 1882 to 1909 to the Urban District Council of Litherland in respect of the Urban District of Litherland in the County of Lancaster. | |
| | Normanton Urban District Electric Lighting Order 1915 Provisional Order granted by the Board of Trade under the Electric Lighting Acts 1882 to 1909 to the Urban District Council of Normanton in respect of the Urban District of Normanton in the West Riding of the County of York. | |
| | Ryde Electric Lighting (Amendment) Order 1915 Provisional Order granted by the Board of Trade under the Electric Lighting Acts 1882 to 1909 to the Mayor Aldermen and Burgesses of the Borough of Ryde for the amendment of the Ryde Electric Lighting Order 1899. | |
| | Skipton Electric Lighting Order 1915 Provisional Order granted by the Board of Trade under the Electric Lighting Acts 1882 to 1909 to the Urban District Council of Skipton in respect of the Urban District of Skipton in the West Riding of the County of York. | |
| | Stanley (Yorkshire) Electric Lighting Order 1915 Provisional Order granted by the Board of Trade under the Electric Lighting Acts 1882 to 1909 to the Electrical Distribution of Yorkshire Limited in respect of the Urban District of Stanley in the West Riding of the County of York. | |
| | Tenby Corporation Electric Lighting Order 1915 Provisional Order granted by the Board of Trade under the Tenby Electric Lighting Acts 1882 to 1909 to the Mayor Aldermen and Burgesses of the Borough of Tenby in respect of the Borough of Tenby in the County of Pembroke. | |
| Electric Lighting Orders Confirmation (No. 3) Act 1915 | 5 & 6 Geo. 5. c. lxxxiii | 29 July 1915 |
An Act to confirm certain Provisional Orders made by the Board of Trade under the Electric Lighting Acts 1882 to 1909 relating to Andover Boston and District Chipstead and District Connah's Quay East Grinstead Urban District Selby and District Southampton (Extension) and Street and District.
| | Andover Electric Lighting Order 1915 Provisional Order granted by the Board of Trade under the Electric Lighting Acts 1882 to 1909 to Crompton and Company Limited in respect of the borough of Andover in the county of Hants. | |
| | Boston and District Electric Lighting Order 1915 Provisional Order granted by the Board of Trade under the Electric Lighting Acts 1882 to 1909 to Robert Arthur Smith in respect of the borough of Boston and the parishes of Skirbeck Skirbeck Quarter Fishtoft Freiston Wyberton Frampton and Kirton in the rural district of Boston in the county of Lincoln. | |
| | Chipstead and District Electric Lighting Order 1915 Provisional Order granted by Chipstead the Board of Trade under the Electric Lighting Acts 1882 to 1909 to Gilbert Allom in respect of the parish of Chipstead in the rural district of Reigate and part of the parish of Woodmansterne in the rural district of Epsom all in the county of Surrey. | |
| | Connah's Quay Electric Lighting Order 1915 Provisional Order granted by the Board of Trade under the Electric Lighting Acts 1882 to 1909 to the urban district council of Connah's Quay in respect of the urban district of Connah's Quay in the county of Flint. | |
| | East Grinstead Urban District Electric Lighting Order 1915 Provisional Order granted by the Board of Trade under the Electric Lighting Acts 1882 to 1909 to the urban district council of East Grinstead in respect of the urban district of East Grinstead in the county of East Sussex. | |
| | Selby and District Electric Lighting Order 1915 Provisional Order granted by the Board of Trade under the Electric Lighting Acts 1882 to 1909 to the Electrical Distribution of Yorkshire Limited in respect of the urban district of Selby in the West Riding of the county of York and the parish of Barlby in the rural district of Riccall in the East Riding of the county of York. | |
| | Southampton Electric Lighting (Extension) Order 1915 Provisional Order granted by the Board. of Trade under the Electric Lighting Acts 1882 to 1909 to the mayor aldermen and burgesses of the borough of Southampton in respect of the parish of Bitterne in the rural district of South Stoneham in the county of Southampton. | |
| | Street and District Electric Lighting Order 1915 Provisional Order granted by the Board of Trade under the Electric Lighting Acts 1882 to 1909 to Christy Brothers and Company Limited in respect of the urban district of Street and the parishes of Compton Dundon and Somerton in the rural district of Langport all in the county of Somerset. | |
| Electric Lighting Orders Confirmation (No. 4) Act 1915 | 5 & 6 Geo. 5. c. lxxxiv | 29 July 1915 |
An Act to confirm certain Provisional Orders made by the Board of Trade under the Electric Lighting Acts 1882 to 1909 relating to Harrogate (Extension) Keighley (Extension) Teignmouth Tunbridge Wells (Extension) Warrington (Extension) and Ystradgynlais.
| | Harrogate Electric Lighting (Extension) Order 1915 Provisional Order granted by the Board of Trade under the Electric Lighting Acts 1882 to 1909 to the mayor aldermen and burgesses of the borough of Harrogate in respect of certain townships or parishes in the rural districts of Knaresborough and Pateley Bridge in the West Riding of the county of York. | |
| | Keighley Electric Lighting (Extension) Order 1915 Provisional Order granted by the Board of Trade under the Electric Lighting Acts 1882 to 1909 to the mayor aldermen and burgesses of the borough of Keighley in respect of the urban districts of Oakworth and Oxenhope and the rural district of Keighley (except a part of the township of East and West Morton) all in the West Riding of the county of York. | |
| | Teignmouth Electric Lighting Order 1915 Provisional Order granted by the Board of Trade under the Electric Lighting Acts 1882 to 1909 to J. and W. Purves in respect of the urban district of Teignmouth in the county of Devon. | |
| | Tunbridge Wells Electric Lighting (Extension) Order 1915 Provisional Order granted by the Board of Trade under the Electric Lighting Acts 1882 to 1909 to the mayor aldermen and burgesses of the borough of Tunbridge Wells in respect of the urban district of Southborough and parts of the parishes of Bidborough Speldhurst Ashurst Tonbridge Rural and Pembury in the rural district of Tonbridge in the county of Kent. | |
| | Warrington Electric Lighting (Extension) Order 1915 Provisional Order granted by the Board of Trade under the Electric Lighting Acts 1882 to 1909 to the mayor aldermen and burgesses of the county borough of Warrington in respect of the parishes of Appleton Grappenhall Latchford Without Stockton Heath Higher Walton Lower Walton and Thelwall in the rural district of Runcorn in the county of Chester and the parishes or townships of Penketh and Great Sankey in the rural district of Warrington in the county palatine of Lancaster. | |
| | Ystradgynlais Rural District Electric Lighting Order 1915 Provisional Order granted by the Board of Trade under the Electric Lighting Acts 1882 to 1909 to the Ystradgynlais Rural District Council in respect of the rural district of Ystradgynlais in the county of Brecon. | |
| Electric Lighting Order Confirmation (No. 5) Act 1915 (repealed) | 5 & 6 Geo. 5. c. lxxxv | 29 July 1915 |
An Act to confirm a Provisional Order made by the Board of Trade under the Electric Lighting Acts 1882 to 1909 with the concurrence of the Local Government Board constituting a Joint Board consisting of representatives of the urban districts of Wath-upon-Dearne Bolton-upon-Dearne and Thurnscoe all in the West Riding of the county of York for the joint exercise of powers under the Electric Lighting Acts in respect of their respective districts. (Repealed by Statute Law (Repeals) Act 1989 (c. 43))
| | Dearne District Electric Lighting Order 1915 Provisional Order granted by the Board of Trade under the Electric Lighting Acts 1882 to 1909 with the concurrence of the Local Government Board constituting a Joint Board consisting of representatives of the urban district councils of Wath-upon-Dearne Bolton-upon-Dearne and Thurnscoe all in the West Riding of the county of York for the joint exercise of powers under the Electric Lighting Acts in respect of their respective districts. | |
| Land Drainage Provisional Order Confirmation Act 1915 | 5 & 6 Geo. 5. c. lxxxvi | 29 July 1915 |
An Act to confirm a Provisional Order under the Land Drainage Act 1861 (Note: Land Drainage Act 1861 (24 & 25 Vict. c. 133)) in the matter of a proposed drainage district in the Parishes of Fangfoss Full Sutton Bolton High Catton Wilberfoss Newton-upon-Derwent Barmby-on-the-Moor Sutton-upon-Derwent Allerthorpe Thornton Storwood Melbourne Wheldrake Thorganby with West Cottingwith East Cottingwith and Bielby in the East Riding of the County of York.
| | Land Drainage (Yorkshire) Order 1915 In the matter of a proposed Drainage District in the Parishes of Fangfoss Full Sutton Bolton High Catton Wilberfoss Newton upon Derwent Barmby on the Moor Sutton upon Derwent Allerthorpe Thornton Storwood Melbourne Wheldrake Thorganby with West Cottingwith East Cottingwith and Bielby in the East Riding of the County of York. | |
| Land Drainage (Ouse) Provisional Order Confirmation Act 1915 | 5 & 6 Geo. 5. c. lxxxvii | 29 July 1915 |
An Act to confirm a Provisional Order under the Land Drainage Act 1914 (Note: Land Drainage Act 1914 (5 & 6 Geo. 5. c. 4)) relating to the River Ouse in the County of Norfolk.
| | Ouse Provisional Order 1915 Ouse Provisional Order. | |
| Land Drainage (Raveningham) Provisional Order Confirmation Act 1915 (repealed) | 5 & 6 Geo. 5. c. lxxxviii | 29 July 1915 |
An Act to confirm a Provisional Order under the Land Drainage Act 1861 in the matter of a proposed drainage district in the parishes of Raveningham Norton Subcourse Thurlton Loddon Chedgrave and Reedham. (Repealed by Statute Law (Repeals) Act 1993 (c. 50))
| | Raveningham Provisional Order 1915 In the matter of a proposed Drainage District in the parishes of Raveningham Norton Subcourse Thurlton Loddon Chedgrave and Reedham in the county of Norfolk. | |
| Local Government Board (Ireland) Provisional Orders Confirmation (No. 1) Act 1915 | 5 & 6 Geo. 5. c. lxxxix | 29 July 1915 |
An Act to confirm certain Provisional Orders of the Local Government Board for Ireland relating to the Urban District of Kingstown the Rural Districts of Dingle Kenmare and Rathdrum and the Londonderry Port Sanitary Authority.
| | Kingstown Order 1915 Provisional Order to enable the Council of the Urban District of Kingstown to put in force the Compulsory Clauses of the Lands Clauses Acts. | |
| | Dingle Waterworks Order 1915 Provisional Order to enable the Council of the Rural District of Dingle to put in force the Compulsory Clauses of the Lands Clauses Acts. | |
| | Kenmare Waterworks Order 1915 Provisional Order to enable the Council of the Rural District of Kenmare to put in force the Compulsory Clauses of the Lands Clauses Acts. | |
| | Rathdrum Waterworks Order 1915 Provisional Order to enable the Council of the Rural District of Rathdrum to put in force the Compulsory Clauses of the Lands Clauses Acts. | |
| | Londonderry Port Authority Order 1915 Provisional Order to enable the Londonderry Port Sanitary Authority to put in force the Compulsory Clauses of the Lands Clauses Acts. | |
| Local Government Board (Ireland) Provisional Orders Confirmation (No. 2) Act 1915 | 5 & 6 Geo. 5. c. xc | 29 July 1915 |
An Act to confirm certain Provisional Orders of the Local Government Board for Ireland relating to the Urban Districts of Armagh and Lisburn and the Rural Districts of Carlow and Dungannon.
| | Armagh Order 1915 Provisional Order to enable the Council of the Urban District of Armagh to put in force the Compulsory Clauses of the Lands Clauses Acts. | |
| | Lisburn Order 1915 Provisional Order to enable the Council of the Urban District of Lisburn to put in force the Compulsory Clauses of the Lands Clauses Acts. | |
| | Bagenalstown, Clonegall and Leighlinbridge Burial Grounds Order 1915 Provisional Order to enable the Council of the Rural District of Carlow to put in force the Compulsory Clauses of the Lands Clauses Acts. | |
| | Dungannon Waterworks Order 1915 Provisional Order to enable the Council of the Rural District of Dungannon to put in force the Compulsory Clauses of the Lands Clauses Acts. | |
| Local Government Board's Provisional Orders Confirmation (No. 5) Act 1915 | 5 & 6 Geo. 5. c. xci | 29 July 1915 |
An Act to confirm certain Provisional Orders of the Local Government Board relating to Birmingham Bootle Bradford Liverpool and Stockton-on-Tees.
| | Birmingham Order 1915 | |
| | Bootle Order 1915 | |
| | Bradford Order 1915 Provisional Order for altering the Bradford Corporation Act 1903. (Note: Bradford Corporation Act 1903 (3 Edw. 7. c. ccxxxiii)) | |
| | Liverpool Order 1915 Provisional Order for altering certain Local Acts and a Confirming Act. (Note: Local Government Board's Provisional Orders Confirmation (No. 2) Act 1911 (1 & 2 Geo. 5. c. cxli)) | |
| | Stockton-on-Tees Order 1915 Provisional Order for altering the Tees Valley Water (Consolidation) Act 1907. (Note: Tees Valley Water (Consolidation) Act 1907 (7 Edw. 7. c. lxxx)) | |
| Local Government Board's Provisional Orders Confirmation (No. 6) Act 1915 | 5 & 6 Geo. 5. c. xcii | 29 July 1915 |
An Act to confirm certain Provisional Orders of the Local Government Board relating to Cardiff Coventry Lytham Sheffield and the Rothwell Joint Cemetery District.
| | Cardiff Order 1915 Provisional Order to enable the Urban Sanitary Authority for the City of Cardiff to put in force the Compulsory Clauses of the Lands Clauses Acts. | |
| | Coventry Order 1915 Provisional Order to enable the Urban Sanitary Authority for the City of Coventry to put in force the Compulsory Clauses of the Lands Clauses Acts. | |
| | Lytham Order 1915 Provisional Order for altering the Lytham Improvement Act 1847 (Note: Lytham Improvement Act 1847 (10 & 11 Vict. c. ccli)) and the Lytham Improvement Act 1904. (Note: Lytham Improvement Act 1904 (4 Edw. 7. c. clv)) | |
| | Sheffield Order 1915 Provisional Order for altering certain Local Acts. | |
| | Rothwell Joint Cemetery Order 1915 Provisional Order to enable the Rothwell Joint Cemetery Board to put in force the Compulsory Clauses of the Lands Clauses Acts. | |
| Local Government Board's Provisional Orders Confirmation (No. 8) Act 1915 | 5 & 6 Geo. 5. c. xciii | 29 July 1915 |
An Act to confirm certain Provisional Orders of the Local Government Board relating to Swansea Wombwell the West Kent Main Sewerage District and Leeds.
| | Swansea Order 1915 Provisional Order to enable the Urban Sanitary Authority for the Borough of Swansea to put in force the Compulsory Clauses of the Lands Clauses Acts. | |
| | Wombwell Order 1915 Provisional Order for partially repealing and altering the Wombwell Local Board Gas Act 1879. (Note: Wombwell Local Board Gas Act 1879 (42 & 43 Vict. c. cxxiv)) | |
| | West Kent Main Sewerage Order 1915 Provisional Order for partially repealing and altering certain Local Acts and Confirming Acts. | |
| | Leeds (Rating, &c.) Order 1915 Provisional Order for partially repealing and altering the Leeds Corporation (Consolidation) Act 1905 (Note: Leeds Corporation (Consolidation) Act 1905 (5 Edw. 7. c. i)) and the Local Government Board's Provisional Orders Confirmation (No. 12) Act 1912. (Note: Local Government Board's Provisional Orders Confirmation (No. 12) Act 1912 (2 & 3 Geo. 5. c. cxxxviii)) | |
| Local Government Board's Provisional Orders Confirmation (No. 9) Act 1915 | 5 & 6 Geo. 5. c. xciv | 29 July 1915 |
An Act to confirm certain Provisional Orders of the Local Government Board relating to the Bury and District Joint Hospital District the Henley and Wallingford and the Middlesex Districts Joint Small-pox Hospital Districts and the North-East Salop United Districts.
| | Bury and District Joint Hospital Order 1915 Provisional Order for altering a Confirming Act. (Note: Local Government Board's Provisional Orders Confirmation (No. 17) Act 1903 (3 Edw. 7. c. lxxxii)) | |
| | Henley and Wallingford Joint Smallpox Hospital Order 1915 Provisional Order for altering the Local Government Board's Provisional Orders Confirmation (No. 3) Act 1904. (Note: Local Government Board's Provisional Orders Confirmation (No. 3) Act 1904 (4 Edw. 7. c. lxiv)) | |
| | Middlesex Districts Joint Smallpox Hospital Order 1915 Provisional Order for altering certain Confirming Acts. | |
| | North-East Salop. United Districts (Medical Officer of Health) Order 1915 Provisional Order for Union of Districts under Section 286 of the Public Health Act 1875. (Note: Public Health Act 1875 (38 & 39 Vict. c. 55)) | |
| Gas and Water Orders Confirmation (No. 1) Act 1915 | 5 & 6 Geo. 5. c. xcv | 29 July 1915 |
An Act to confirm certain Provisional Orders made by the Board of Trade under the Gas and Water Works Facilities Act 1870 (Note: Gas and Water Works Facilities Act 1870 (33 & 34 Vict. c. 70)) relating to Oakham Gas Staveley Gas Thirsk Gas and Thirsk District Water.
| | Oakham Gas Order 1915 Order extending the limits of supply of the Oakham Gas Company Limited and empowering the Company to raise additional capital and for other purposes. | |
| | Staveley Gas Order 1915 Order empowering the Staveley Gas Light and Coke Company Limited to extend their limits of supply to construct additional Gasworks and to raise additional capital and for other purposes. | |
| | Thirsk Gas Order 1915 Order empowering the Thirsk Gas Company to construct additional gasworks and to raise additional capital and for other purposes. | |
| | Thirsk District Water Order 1915 Order extending and defining the limits of supply of the Thirsk District Water Company Limited and authorising the Company to construct new Waterworks and to raise additional Capital and for other purposes. | |
| Gas and Water Orders Confirmation (No. 2) Act 1915 | 5 & 6 Geo. 5. c. xcvi | 29 July 1915 |
An Act to confirm certain Provisional Orders made by the Board of Trade under the Gas and Water Works Facilities Act 1870 relating to Guildford Gas Melton Mowbray Gas Swanage Gas and Hoylake and West Kirby Gas and Water.
| | Guildford Gas Order 1915 Order empowering the Guildford Gas Light and Coke Company to define and extend their limits of supply and to raise additional capital and for other purposes. | |
| | Melton Mowbray Gas Order 1915 Order to authorise the Melton Mowbray Gas Light and Coke Company Limited to extend their limits of supply and to raise additional capital and for other purposes. | |
| | Swanage Gas Order 1915 Order to make provision with reference to the Capital of the Swanage Gas Company. | |
| | Hoylake and West Kirby Gas and Water Order 1915 Order empowering the Hoylake and West Kirby Gas and Water Company Limited to purchase additional Lands to construct additional Gasworks to raise additional Capital and for other purposes in connexion with their Gas and Water Undertakings. | |
| Gas and Water Orders Confirmation (No. 3) Act 1915 | 5 & 6 Geo. 5. c. xcvii | 29 July 1915 |
An Act to confirm certain Provisional Orders made by the Board of Trade under the Gas and Water Works Facilities Act 1870 relating to Cheadle Gas Heathfield and Waldron Gas Liverpool Gas Mid Kent Gas Light and Coke Rothwell Gas and Fisherton Anger and Bemerton Waterworks.
| | Cheadle Gas Order 1915 Order authorising the maintenance and continuance of existing gasworks and works connected therewith and the manufacture and supply of gas in the parish of Cheadle in the county of Stafford. | |
| | Heathfield and Waldron Gas Order 1915 Order empowering the Heathfield and Waldron Gas Light and Coke Company Limited to maintain and continue gasworks and to manufacture and supply gas within the parishes of Heathfield and Waldron in the county of Sussex and for other purposes. | |
| | Liverpool Gas Order 1915 Order extending the limits of supply of the Liverpool Gas Company empowering the Company to acquire the gas undertaking of the Liverpool Corporation in the township of Fazakerley and for other purposes. | |
| | Mid Kent Gas Light and Coke Order 1915 Order empowering the Mid Kent Gas Light and Coke Company to raise unissued capital by preference shares and for other purposes. | |
| | Rothwell Gas Order 1915 Order empowering the Rothwell Gas Light Company to raise additional capital and for other purposes. | |
| | Fisherton Anger and Bemerton Waterworks Order 1915 Order increasing the capital of the Fisherton Anger and Bemerton Waterworks Company and for other purposes. | |
| Pier and Harbour Orders Confirmation (No. 1) Act 1915 | 5 & 6 Geo. 5. c. xcviii | 29 July 1915 |
An Act to confirm certain Provisional Orders made by the Board of Trade under the General Pier and Harbour Act 1861 (Note: General Pier and Harbour Act 1861 (24 & 25 Vict. c. 45)) relating to Lossiemouth and Portmadoc.
| | Lossiemouth Old Harbour Order 1915 Order amending the Lossiemouth Old Harbour Order 1912. | |
| | Portmadoc Harbour Order 1915 Order to incorporate a body of Trustees and to authorise the acquisition of the existing harbour and the construction maintenance and regulation of works at the harbour of Portmadoc in the counties of Carnarvon and Merioneth. | |
| Pier and Harbour Orders Confirmation (No. 2) Act 1915 | 5 & 6 Geo. 5. c. xcix | 29 July 1915 |
An Act to confirm certain Provisional Orders made by the Board of Trade under the General Pier and Harbour Act 1861 relating to Cattewater and Poole.
| | Cattewater Harbour Order 1915 For the management and maintenance of the harbour of Cattewater in the county of Devon and for repealing the Cattewater Harbour Orders 1874 1876 and 1885 and for conferring further powers on the Cattewater Commissioners. | |
| | Poole Harbour Order 1915 Order for amending the Poole Harbour Act 1895 in regard to the constitution of the Poole Harbour Commissioners and for other purposes. | |
| Education Board Provisional Orders Confirmation (Derbyshire, &c.) Act 1915 | 5 & 6 Geo. 5. c. c | 29 July 1915 |
An Act to confirm certain Provisional Orders made by the Board of Education under the Education Acts 1870 to 1911 to enable the Councils of the Administrative Counties of Derby the Isle of Ely and Montgomery the County Borough of West Ham and the Urban District of Leyton to put in force the Lands Clauses Acts.
| | Derbyshire County Council Order 1915 Provisional Order for putting in force the Lands Clauses Acts. | |
| | Isle of Ely County Council Order 1915 Provisional Order for putting in force the Lands Clauses Acts. | |
| | Montgomery County Council Order 1915 Provisional Order for putting in force the Lands Clauses Acts. | |
| | West Ham County Borough Council Order 1915 Provisional Order for putting in force the Lands Clauses Acts. | |
| | Leyton Urban District Council Order 1915 Provisional Order for putting in force the Lands Clauses Acts. | |
| Education Board Provisional Orders Confirmation (London) Act 1915 | 5 & 6 Geo. 5. c. ci | 29 July 1915 |
An Act to confirm certain Provisional Orders made by the Board of Education under the Education Acts 1870 to 1911 to enable the London County Council to put in force the Lands Clauses Acts.
| | London County Council Order (No. 1) 1915 | |
| | London County Council Order (No. 2) 1915 | |
| Clackmannan County Water Order Confirmation Act 1915 | 5 & 6 Geo. 5. c. cii | 13 October 1915 |
An Act to confirm a Provisional Order under the Private Legislation Procedure (Scotland) Act 1899 relating to Clackmannan County Water.
| | Clackmannan County Water Order 1915 Provisional Order to authorise the County Council of the county of Clackmannan to construct waterworks for the supply of the Alloa and Tillicoultry Special Water Supply District and for other purposes. | |
| London County Council (General Powers) Act 1915 (repealed) | 5 & 6 Geo. 5. c. ciii | 28 October 1915 |
An Act to make provision with regard to high-pressure gas meters music and dancing licences lying-in homes establishments for massage or special treatment and dangerous businesses to make provision as to the administration of powers under the Lunacy Acts to confer various powers upon the London County Council the corporation of the city of London and the metropolitan borough councils and for other purposes. (Repealed by Greater London Council (General Powers) Act 1979 (c. xxiii))
| London County Council (Tramways and Improvements) Act 1915 | 5 & 6 Geo. 5. c. civ | 28 October 1915 |
An Act to empower the London County Council to construct and work new tramways to alter and reconstruct existing tramways and to make street improvements and other works and for other purposes.
| Glasgow Water Order Confirmation Act 1915 (repealed) | 5 & 6 Geo. 5. c. cv | 28 October 1915 |
An Act to confirm a Provisional Order under the Private Legislation Procedure (Scotland) Act 1899 relating to Glasgow Water. (Repealed by Glasgow Corporation Consolidation (Water, Transport and Markets) Order Confirmation Act 1964 (c. xliii))
| | Glasgow Water Order 1915 Provisional Order to authorise the Corporation of the city of Glasgow to construct waterworks to borrow money and for other purposes. | |
| Dundee Corporation Order Confirmation Act 1915 (repealed) | 5 & 6 Geo. 5. c. cvi | 10 November 1915 |
An Act to confirm a Provisional Order under the Private Legislation Procedure (Scotland) Act 1899 relating to Dundee Corporation. (Repealed by Dundee Corporation (Consolidated Powers) Order Confirmation Act 1957 (6 & 7 Eliz. 2. c. iv))
| | Dundee Corporation Order 1915 Provisional Order for the erection and maintenance of a Municipal Hall for the City and Royal Burgh of Dundee and the abandonment of certain authorised works and the construction of a substituted street work and for other purposes. | |
| Port Dundas Church and Parish Quoad Sacra Glasgow Order Confirmation Act 1915 | 5 & 6 Geo. 5. c. cvii | 23 December 1915 |
An Act to confirm a Provisional Order under the Private Legislation Procedure (Scotland) Act 1899 relating to Port Dundas Church and Parish Quoad Sacra Glasgow.
| | Port Dundas Church and Parish Quoad Sacra Glasgow Order 1915 | |
| London County Council (Celluloid, &c.) Act 1915 (repealed) | 5 & 6 Geo. 5. c. cviii | 23 December 1915 |
An Act to make provision with regard to cinematograph films and celluloid and for other purposes. (Repealed by London Government Act 1963 (c. 33))
| Glasgow Celluloid Act 1915 (repealed) | 5 & 6 Geo. 5. c. cix | 23 December 1915 |
An Act to confer powers on the corporation of the city of Glasgow with respect to cinematograph film and celluloid and for other purposes. (Repealed by Glasgow Streets, Sewers and Buildings Consolidation Order Confirmation Act 1937 (1 Edw. 8 & 1 Geo. 6. c. xliii))

=== Private and personal acts ===
| Short title | Citation | Royal assent |
Long title
| Beamish Divorce Act 1915 (Note: This act was not printed by the King's Printer) | 5 & 6 Geo. 5. c. 2 Pr. | 19 May 1915 |
An Act to dissolve the marriage of Richard Henrik Beamish of Ashbourne Glounthaune in the county of Cork a Justice of the Peace and Deputy Lieutenant of the city of Cork with Violet Edith Beamish his wife and to enable him to marry again and for other purposes.
| Denny's Divorce Act 1915 | 5 & 6 Geo. 5. c. 3 Pr. | 19 May 1915 |
An Act to dissolve the marriage of Phyllis Denny of Claverdon Hall in the county of Warwick with Gerald Henry Maynard Denny her husband and to enable her to marry again and for other purposes.
| Massy's Divorce Act 1915 | 5 & 6 Geo. 5. c. 4 Pr. | 29 July 1915 |
An Act to dissolve the marriage of Hugh Eyre Barton Massy of Stackallan Navan in the county of Meath Esquire with Gladys Massy his now wife and to enable him to marry again and for other purposes.

=== Sources ===
- 5 & 6 George V - 1914-6 – via HathiTrust.

== See also ==
- List of acts of the Parliament of the United Kingdom
