= Trading with the enemy (disambiguation) =

Trading with the enemy may refer to

- Trading with the enemy, a legal term
- Trading with the Enemy, a music album

== See also ==
- Trading with the Enemy Act
