= Daimler Co Ltd v Continental Tyre and Rubber Co (GB) Ltd =

UK company law case

Daimler Co Ltd v Continental Tyre and Rubber Co (Great Britain) Ltd
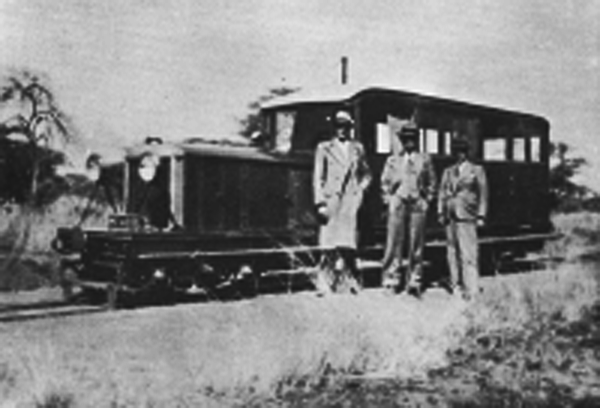
- Court: House of Lords
- Citations: [1916] UKHL 845; [1916] 2 AC 307; 53 SLR 845
- Transcript: judgment

Case history
- Prior action: [1915] 1 KB 893

Court membership
- Judges sitting: Lord Parker, Earl of Halsbury LC, Lord Atkinson, Viscount Mersey, Lord Kinnear, Lord Sumner, Lord Shaw and Lord Parmoor

Keywords
- Control, enemy character, lifting the veil

Daimler Co Ltd v Continental Tyre and Rubber Co (Great Britain) Ltd [1916] 2 AC 307 is a UK company law case, concerning the concept of "control" and enemy character of a company. It is usually discussed in the context of lifting the corporate veil, however it is merely an example of where the corporate veil is not in issue as a matter of company law, since the decision turns on correct interpretation of a statute.

== Facts ==
All except one of Continental Tyre and Rubber Co Ltd's shares were held by German residents and all directors were German residents. The secretary was English. Continental Tyre and Rubber Co Ltd supplied tyres to Daimler, but Daimler was concerned that making payment might contravene a common law offence of trading with the enemy as well as a proclamation issued under s 3 (1) Trading with the Enemy Act 1914. Daimler brought the action to determine if payment could be made, given that it was the First World War.

== Judgment ==
At first instance, Scrutton J approved the decision of the master, that the contracts were valid, for summary judgment without proceeding to trial.

=== Court of Appeal ===
Lord Reading CJ, Cozens-Hardy LJ, Phillimore LJ, Pickford LJ and Kennedy LJ, affirmed the decision too, holding there would be no offence. They held the company did not change its character because of the outbreak of war. They say it "remains an English company regardless of the residence of its shareholders or directors either before or after the declaration of war." Mr Gore-Browne argued, for Daimler Co Ltd, that the technicality should be swept aside in time of war. But Lord Reading CJ replied that the fact of incorporation was not just a ‘technicality’. The company, he said,

is a living thing with a separate existence which cannot be swept aside as a technicality. It is not a mere name or mask or cloak or device to conceal the identity of persons and it is not suggested that the company was formed for any dishonest or fraudulent purpose. It is a legal body clothed with the form prescribed by the legislature…’

He relied on Janson v Driefontein Consolidated Mines, where Lord Macnaghten, Lord Brampton and Lord Lindley, holding that a foreign corporation does not become British because its means all are.

Buckley LJ delivered a dissenting judgment, would have held that though the company is a legal person existing apart from its corporators, that it still had enemy character.

The artificial legal person called the corporation has no physical existence. It exists only in contemplation of law. It has neither body, parts, nor passions. It cannot wear weapons nor serve in the wars. It can be neither loyal nor disloyal. It cannot compass treason. It can be neither friend nor enemy. Apart from its corporators it can have neither thoughts, wishes, nor intentions, for it has no mind other than the minds of the corporators. These considerations seem to me essential to bear in mind in determining the present case.

=== House of Lords ===
The House of Lords unanimously reversed the decisions below, saying the secretary was authorised to commence no action. It held the company was capable of acquiring enemy character.

Lord Parker said,

I do not think, however, that it is a necessary corollary of this reasoning [Salomon] to say that the character of its corporators must be irrelevant to the character of the company; and this is crucial, for the rule against trading with the enemy depends upon enemy character.

Just like a natural person can have enemy character though born in the UK, so can a legal person.

I think that the analogy is to be found in control, an idea which, if not very familiar in law, is of capital importance and is very well understood in commerce and finance. The acts of a company’s organs, its directors, managers, secretary, and so forth, functioning within the scope of their authority, are the company’s acts and may invest it definitely with enemy character… it must at least be prima facie relevant… Certainly I have found no authority to the contrary.

The Earl of Halsbury LC, Lord Atkinson, Viscount Mersey, Lord Kinnear and Lord Sumner concurred. Lord Shaw and Lord Parmoor concurred in the result but dissented on this point.

== Significance ==
Around the start of World War II the Trading with the Enemy Act 1939 section 2(1)(c) was implemented to state the position in Daimler, namely "so long as the body is controlled by a person who, under this section, is an enemy". In Bermuda Cablevision Ltd v Colica Trust Co Ltd Lord Steyn made the point that, "Expressions such as ‘control’ and ‘controlling interest’ take their colour from the context in which they appear. There is no general rule as to what the word ‘controlled’ means.... The expression must be given the meaning which the context requires."

The concept of a company's character was also seen in the ill-fated Merchant Shipping Act 1988 said that only fishing vessels registered as ‘British’ were eligible to fish for the UK quota, and a ‘British’ company had to be 75% British owned. However, in R (Factortame) v Secretary of State for Transport (No 3), the European Court of Justice held that this was contrary to art 52 TEC, and the right to freedom of establishment.

== See also ==
- UK company law

== Notes ==
- This case law has also been mentioned in the "Companies Act, 1956" of India.
