= Price of Coal (Limitation) Act 1915 =

Act of the Parliament of the United Kingdom

Price of Coal (Limitation) Act 1915 (Note: Section 4(4).)
- Act of Parliament
- Parliament of the United Kingdom
- Long title: An Act to provide for the limitation of the Price of Coal.
- Citation: 5 & 6 Geo. 5. c. 75
- Territorial extent: United Kingdom (Note: But see section 4(3).)

Dates
- Royal assent: 29 July 1915
- Commencement: 29 July 1915 (Note: The Acts of Parliament (Commencement) Act 1793.)
- Expired: 11 May 1919 (Note: Section 4(5).)
- Repealed: 1 September 1920
Other legislation
Repealed by	Mining Industry Act 1920

Status: Repealed

Text of statute as originally enacted

The Price of Coal (Limitation) Act 1915 (5 & 6 Geo. 5. c. 75) was an act of the Parliament of the United Kingdom. The act was a piece of war time legislation, introduced by Walter Runciman to regulate the price of coal.

== Subsequent developments ==
The whole act was repealed by section 24 of the Mining Industry Act 1920 (10 & 11 Geo. 5. c. 50), which came into force on 1 September 1920.
