= Trading with the Enemy Act 1939 =

Act of the Parliament of the United Kingdom

Trading with the Enemy Act 1939 (Note: Section 17(1).)
- Act of Parliament
- Parliament of the United Kingdom
- Long title: An Act to impose penalties for trading with the enemy, to make provision as respects the property of enemies and enemy subjects, and for purposes connected with the matters aforesaid.
- Citation: 2 & 3 Geo. 6. c. 89
- Territorial extent: United Kingdom

Dates
- Royal assent: 5 September 1939
- Commencement: (Note: Section 17(2).)
Other legislation
Amends	Trading with the Enemy and Export of Prohibited Goods Act 1916
Repeals/revokes	Trading with the Enemy Act 1914; Trading with the Enemy Amendment Act 1914; Trading with the Enemy Amendment Act 1915; Trading with the Enemy (Extension of Powers) Act 1915; Trading with the Enemy Amendment Act 1916; Trading with the Enemy (Copyright) Act 1916; Trading with the Enemy (Amendment) Act 1918
Amended by	Companies Act 1948; Criminal Justice Act 1948; Newfoundland (Consequential Provisions) Act 1950; Statute Law Revision Act 1953; Emergency Laws (Miscellaneous Provisions) Act 1953; Criminal Justice Act (Northern Ireland) 1953; Industrial Expansion Act 1968; Criminal Jurisdiction Act 1975; Criminal Procedure (Scotland) Act 1975; Statute Law (Repeals) Act 1995

Status: Amended

Text of statute as originally enacted

Revised text of statute as amended

Text of the Trading with the Enemy Act 1939 as in force today (including any amendments) within the United Kingdom, from legislation.gov.uk.

The Trading with the Enemy Act 1939 (2 & 3 Geo. 6. c. 89) is an act of the Parliament of the United Kingdom which makes it a criminal offence to conduct trade with the enemy in wartime, with a penalty of up to seven years' imprisonment. The bill passed rapidly through Parliament in just two days, from 3 to 5 September 1939, and the act was passed on 5 September 1939, at the beginning of the Second World War. It is still in force.

The act's provisions about the custody of enemy property were inspiration for the Israeli Absentee Property Regulations and other laws passed in 1948 about the use of the Palestinians' properties by the state of Israel. However, the 1939 act said that enemy property was only being confiscated "[w]ith a view to preventing the payment of money to enemies and of preserving enemy property in contemplation of arrangements to be made at the conclusion of peace..."

== Subsequent developments ==
Section 8 of the act was repealed by section 1 of, and the first schedule to, the Statute Law Revision Act 1953 (2 & 3 Eliz. 2. c. 5), which came into force on 18 December 1953.

== See also ==
- Trading with the Enemy Act
- Trading with the Enemy Act 1914
- Daimler Co Ltd v Continental Tyre and Rubber Co (Great Britain) Ltd
