= Trading with the Enemy Act =

Title of some U.K. and U.S. laws about economics in war time

Trading with the Enemy Act is a stock short title used for legislation in the United Kingdom and the United States relating to trading with the enemy.

Trading with the Enemy Acts is also a generic name for a class of legislation generally passed during or approaching a war that prohibit not just mercantile activities with foreign nationals, but also acts that might assist the enemy. While originally limited to wartime, in the 20th century these Acts were applied in cases of national emergency as well. For example, in 1940, before the United States entry into World War II the president imposed broad prohibitions on the transfer of property in which Norway or Denmark, or any citizen or national of those countries, or any other person aiding those countries, had any interest, with the exception of transfers which were licensed under the regulations of the Department of the Treasury.

== List ==
=== France ===
- Continental System, French Napoleonic edict from 1806 to 1814

=== United Kingdom ===
- The Trading with the Enemy Act 1914 (4 & 5 Geo. 5. c. 87)
- The Trading with the Enemy Amendment Act 1914 (5 & 6 Geo. 5. c. 12)
- The Trading with the Enemy Amendment Act 1915 (5 & 6 Geo. 5. c. 79)
- The Trading with the Enemy (Extension of Powers) Act 1915 (5 & 6 Geo. 5. c. 98)
- The Trading with the Enemy Amendment Act 1916 (5 & 6 Geo. 5. c. 105)
- The Trading with the Enemy (Copyright) Act 1916 (6 & 7 Geo. 5. c. 32)
- The Trading with the Enemy and Export of Prohibited Goods Act 1916 (6 & 7 Geo. 5. c. 52)
- The Trading with the Enemy (Amendment) Act 1918 (8 & 9 Geo. 5. c. 31)
- The Trading with the Enemy Act 1939 (2 & 3 Geo. 6. c. 89)

=== United States ===
- The Trading with the Enemy Act of 1917 is still in force. This Act established the Office of Alien Property Custodian to manage the property of US enemies, such as patents filed in the US by German nationals. The US government office was intended to manage that intellectual property in the US interest during the war.

=== Israel ===
The British Trading with the Enemy Act 1939 was applied to Mandatory Palestine, as to other British-ruled territories. On the creation of Israel in 1948, it was retained as an Israeli law and the various Arab countries named in it as "The Enemy". It is still in force as of 2024, though Egypt and Jordan were removed from its application with the respective peace agreements Israel signed with them. According to the Chief Economist Division of Israel's Ministry of Finance, which is in charge of the designation of enemy states, the enemy states for the purpose of the Ordinance are currently Iran, Iraq, Syria, and Lebanon. While Iraq is defined as an enemy state, a temporary permit for Israelis to trade with Iraqi companies and individuals has been granted and has been renewed on an annual basis.

== See also ==
- List of short titles
