= Trading with the Enemy Act 1914 =

Act of the Parliament of the United Kingdom

Trading with the Enemy Act 1914 (Note: Section 4(1).)
- Act of Parliament
- Parliament of the United Kingdom
- Long title: An Act to make provision with respect to penalties for Trading with the Enemy, and other purposes connected therewith.
- Citation: 4 & 5 Geo. 5. c. 87
- Territorial extent: United Kingdom

Dates
- Royal assent: 18 September 1914
- Commencement: 18 September 1914 (Note: The Acts of Parliament (Commencement) Act 1793.)
- Repealed
Other legislation
Repealed by	Trading with the Enemy Act 1939

Status: Repealed

Text of statute as originally enacted

The Trading with the Enemy Act 1914 (4 & 5 Geo. 5. c. 87) was an act of the Parliament of the United Kingdom that prescribed an offence of conducting business with any person of "enemy character". The act was enacted soon after the United Kingdom became involved in World War I.

== Trading with the Enemy Amendment Act 1916 ==
Under the 1914 act, ownership of enemy assets (unless the property was insignificant) had been put in trust and held by the Public Trustee; business activities were monitored by the Board of Trade. The 1916 amendment required trustees to liquidate those holdings and hold the sale proceeds in trust for the enemy until the end of hostilities.

== Impact of the act ==
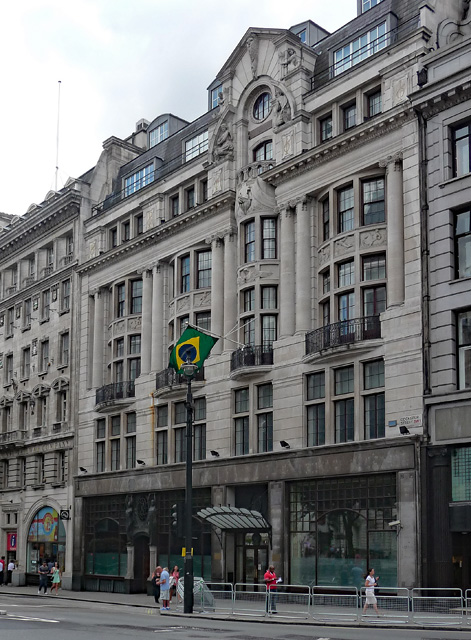
Hamburg-Amerika House, put up for sale under the Trading with the Enemy Act 1914

Daimler Co Ltd v Continental Tyre and Rubber Co (GB) Ltd [1916] 2 AC 307 created case law as regards a company as a legal person, just like a natural person, can have enemy character though established in the UK.

The Hamburg-Amerika House, premises of the Hamburg America Line, 14-16 Cockspur Street, London, were offered for sale in 1917. The buyer was required to fill in a form to confirm on purchase that they were not purchasing on behalf of any nation "at war with Great Britain".

== Subsequent developments ==
The whole of the 1914 and 1916 acts were repealed by section 17(3) of, and the schedule to, the Trading with the Enemy Act 1939 (2 & 3 Geo. 6. c. 89), which came into force on. The 1939 act was passed after the outbreak of the Second World War.

== See also ==
- Daimler Co Ltd v Continental Tyre and Rubber Co (Great Britain) Ltd
- Trading with the Enemy Act
