= Trading with the enemy =

Legal term

Trading with the enemy is a legal term of English origin that is used with a number of related meanings. It refers to:

1. An offence at common law and under statute
2. A ground for condemnation of ships in prize proceedings
3. A ground for illegality and nullity in contract

== United Kingdom ==
The statutory offence is now created by section 1 of the Trading with the Enemy Act 1939.

== See also ==
- Trading with the Enemy Act
