= Unemployment Insurance Act =

Unemployment Insurance Act may refer to:

== Acts of the Parliament of the United Kingdom ==
- Unemployment Insurance Act 1920 (10 & 11 Geo. 5. c. 30)
- Unemployment Insurance Act 1921 (11 & 12 Geo. 5. c. 1)
- Unemployment Insurance (No. 2) Act 1921 (11 & 12 Geo. 5. c. 15)
- Unemployment Insurance Act 1922 (12 & 13 Geo. 5. c. 7)
- Unemployment Insurance (No. 2) Act 1922 (12 & 13 Geo. 5. c. 30)
- Unemployment Insurance Act 1923 (13 & 14 Geo. 5. c. 2)
- Unemployment Insurance Act 1924 (14 & 15 Geo. 5. c. 1)
- Unemployment Insurance (No. 2) Act 1924 (14 & 15 Geo. 5. c. 30)
- Unemployment Insurance (No. 3) Act 1924 (14 & 15 Geo. 5. c. 6)
- Unemployment Insurance Act 1925 (15 & 16 Geo. 5. c. 69)
- Unemployment Insurance Act 1926 (16 & 17 Geo. 5. c. 12)
- Unemployment Insurance Act 1927 (17 & 18 Geo. 5. c. 30)
- Unemployment Insurance Act 1928 (19 & 20 Geo. 5. c. 1)
- Unemployment Insurance Act 1929 (20 & 21 Geo. 5. c. 3)
- Unemployment Insurance Act 1930 (20 & 21 Geo. 5. c. 16)
- Unemployment Insurance (No. 2) Act 1930 (20 & 21 Geo. 5. c. 19)
- Unemployment Insurance (No. 3) Act 1930 (20 & 21 Geo. 5. c. 47)
- Unemployment Insurance (No. 4) Act 1930 (21 & 22 Geo. 5. c. 3)
- Unemployment Insurance Act 1931 (21 & 22 Geo. 5. c. 8)
- Unemployment Insurance (No. 2) Act 1931 (21 & 22 Geo. 5. c. 25)
- Unemployment Insurance (No. 3) Act 1931 (21 & 22 Geo. 5. c. 36)
- Unemployment Insurance Act 1935 (25 & 26 Geo. 5. c. 8)
- Unemployment Insurance Act 1938 (1 & 2 Geo. 6. c. 8)
- Unemployment Insurance Act 1939 (2 & 3 Geo. 6. c. 29)
- Unemployment Insurance Act 1940 (3 & 4 Geo. 6. c. 44)

== Acts of the Oireachtas of Ireland ==
- Unemployment Insurance Act 1923 (No. 17)
- Unemployment Insurance Act 1924 (No. 26)
- Unemployment Insurance (No. 2) Act 1924 (No. 59)
- Unemployment Insurance Act 1926 (No. 21)
- Unemployment Insurance Act 1930 (No. 33)
- Unemployment Insurance Act 1933 (No. 44)
- Unemployment Insurance Act 1941 (No. 3)
- Unemployment Insurance Act 1943 (No. 20)
- Unemployment Insurance Act 1945 (No. 23)
- Unemployment Insurance Act 1946 (No. 37)
