= Interwar unemployment and poverty in the United Kingdom =

British unemployment between the world wars

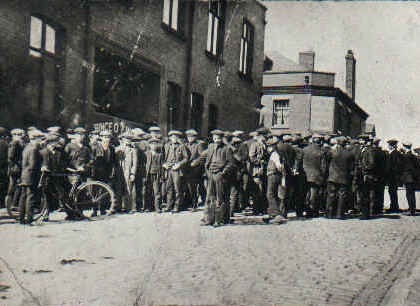
The 1926 General Strike was called to highlight the wage reductions coal miners faced.

Unemployment was the dominant issue of British society during the interwar years. Unemployment levels rarely dipped below 1,000,000 and reached a peak of more than 3,000,000 in 1933, a figure which represented more than 20% of the working population. The unemployment rate was even higher in areas including South Wales and Liverpool. The Government extended unemployment insurance schemes in 1920 to alleviate the effects of unemployment.

== Causes ==
There were several reasons for the decline in industry after the First World War. The end of the war brought a boom. In the shipping industry, businesses expanded rapidly in order to take advantage of the increase in demand. However, the boom was short-lived and this rapid expansion caused a slump from oversupply. Structural weaknesses in the British economy meant a disproportionate number of jobs were in the traditional industries. A combination of a lack of pre-war technological development and post-war competition damaged the economy and the new industries which emerged employed fewer people. At the same time, Britain began to lose its overseas markets due to strong foreign competition. Some have argued that an overly generous unemployment insurance system worsened the state of the economy. The Wall Street crash in 1929 was responsible for a worldwide downturn in trade and led to the Great Depression.

Apart from the major pockets of unemployment, Britain was generally prosperous. Historian Piers Brendon writes:

Historians, however, have long since revised this grim picture, presenting the devil's decade as the cradle of the affluent society. Prices fell sharply between the wars and average incomes rose by about a third. The term "property-owning democracy" was coined in the 1920s, and 3,000,000 houses were built during the 1930s. Land, labour and materials were cheap: a bungalow could be purchased for £225 and a semi for £450. The middle-class also bought radiograms, telephones, three-piece suites, electric cookers, vacuum cleaners and golf clubs. They ate Kellogg's Corn Flakes ("never miss a day"), drove to Odeon cinemas in Austin Sevens (costing £135 by 1930) and smoked Craven A cigarettes, cork-tipped "to prevent sore throats". The depression spawned a consumer boom.

== Response ==
=== Lloyd George's coalition ===
As the Government had funded the Great War largely through borrowing, Britain had run up a large national debt. A boom in the economy occurred in 1919 causing unemployment rates to decrease. The boom stopped in 1920 when unemployment began to rise, and by the time that the Liberal-Conservative coalition lost power at the 1922 general election, the unemployment rate had reached 2,500,000. A committee on unemployment was set up in 1920 and recommended public work schemes to ease unemployment, leading to the establishment of the Unemployment Grants Committee. As unemployment was not uniform across Britain, it was decided to concentrate schemes in areas of the country that were particularly affected by the economic downturn. However, the government also wished to return to the gold standard, a move that would have required cuts in public spending. The Unemployment Insurance Act 1920 extended unemployment benefits to cover all workers who earned less than £250. The "Seeking Work Test" was introduced in 1921, which stipulated that to receive full employment benefit, there had to be evidence that the recipient was looking for work.

=== Conservative policy ===
The Unemployment Insurance Act 1927 returned to the principle that workers had to contribute to insurance schemes in order to be a part of them. The workhouse system was abolished and replaced with a system of public assistance committeess.

=== Labour Policy ===
Ramsay MacDonald's Government passed the Development (Loan Guarantees and Grants) Act 1929 (20 & 21 Geo. 5. c. 7).

=== National Government ===
In 1931, a National Government formed after Cabinet splits resulting from the financial crisis. National Governments would stay in power from 1931-1940 until Winston Churchill became Prime Minister of a Coalition Government during the Second World War.

Local government was reorganised so that local authorities provided school dinners and health services, means testing was introduced and the Unemployment Assistance Board was set up in 1934. Economic measures included the devaluation of the pound and taking Britain's currency off of the gold standard, borrowing also increased. The Special Areas Act 1934 attempted to inject finance into depressed areas and British industry was protected by protectionist measures such as state subsidies and import quotas. The Unemployment Act 1934 increased the numbers covered by unemployment insurance.

== Legislation ==
- Unemployment Insurance Act 1920
- Unemployment Insurance Act 1921
- Unemployment Insurance Act 1924
- Unemployment Insurance Act 1927
- Unemployment Insurance Act 1930
- Coal Mines Act 1930
- Import Duties Act 1932
- Unemployment Act 1934
- Special Areas Act 1934
- British Shipping (Assistance) Act 1935
- Cotton Spinning Industry Act 1936
- Special Areas (Amendment) Act 1937
- Cotton Industry (Reorganisation) Act 1939

== Unrest ==
There were several examples of unrest during this period, most notably the General Strike of 1926 and the Jarrow March of October 1936. There were also protests against the introduction of means testing and hunger marches organized by the National Unemployed Workers Movement.
