= Ministry of Labour (United Kingdom) =

Former UK government department

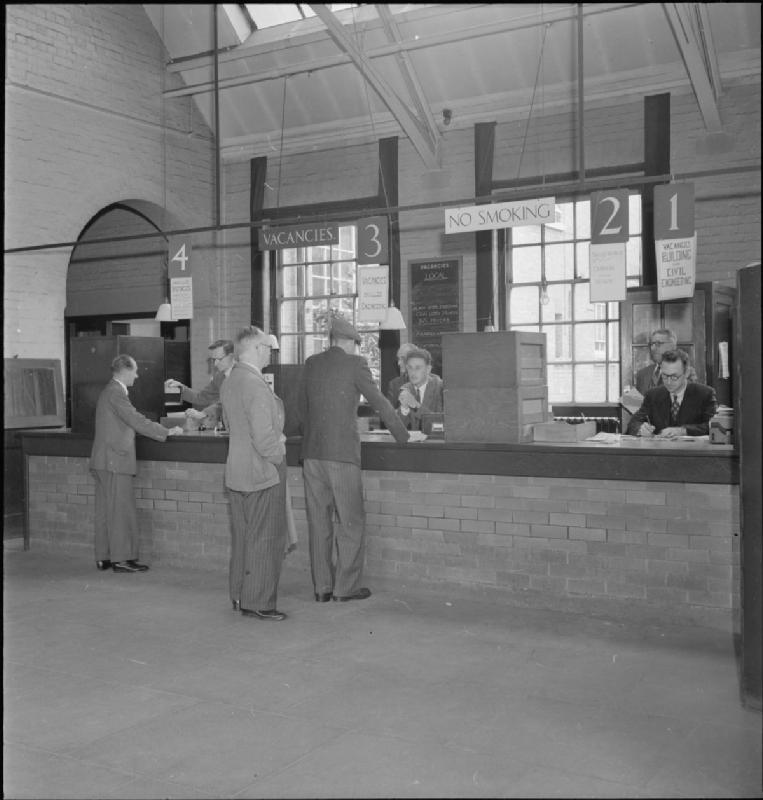
Labour Exchange Reading, Berkshire, UK during second world war

The Ministry of Labour was a British government department established by the New Ministries and Secretaries Act 1916. It later morphed into the Department of Employment. Most of its functions are now performed by the Department for Work and Pensions.

== History ==
After the New Ministries and Secretaries Act 1916 (6 & 7 Geo. 5. c. 68) the Ministry of Labour took over Board of Trade responsibilities for conciliation, labour exchanges, labour and industrial relations and employment related statistics. Following World War I it supervised the demobilisation and resettlement of ex-British Expeditionary Force servicemen. In the 1920s it took over all Board of Education work relating to youth employment and responsibility for training and employment of disabled people from the Ministry of Pensions. It also supervised trade union regulations.

Under the Trade Boards Act 1918 the Ministry enforced the minimum wage, helped establish joint industrial councils, and set up the Industrial Court in 1919 for arbitration of industrial disputes. It proposed multiple Unemployment Insurance Acts amendments, administered benefits through employment exchanges, employed the unemployed through special works schemes (through the Unemployment Grants Committee), and represented the UK at the International Labour Organization from 1919).

From 1939, the department was renamed the Ministry of Labour and National Service, reflecting new duties under the National Service (Armed Forces) Act 1939. It allocated people to work between the armed forces, civil defence and industry, and to administer the Schedule of Reserved Occupations. The National Joint Advisory Council, comprising employers' and workers' representatives, was consulted. From 1941, one Deputy Secretary for the Ministry controlled peacetime work, and another coordinated work on manpower statistics, intelligence, armed forces recruitment, civilian war work and training and labour supply.

The ministry vastly expanded during World War II, particularly after Prime Minister Winston Churchill appointed Labour Party trade unionist Ernest Bevin as Minister of Labour in his war coalition in 1940. The Ministry was responsible for solving labour shortages caused by the war and maintaining high production outputs. The Defence Regulations gave the organ significant powers over the direction of labour and mandatory industrial arbitration, although Bevin enforced them sparingly and favored conciliation through a national Joint Consultative Committee with equal representation from both trade unions and employers. Under Bevin the ministry also encouraged increased unionization, although strikes were discouraged during the war and news of ones that did occur were censored.

In April 1945, functions relating to unemployment insurance and assistance were transferred to the Ministry of National Insurance, but the Ministry of Labour retained responsibility for employment exchanges. In June 1945, the Board of Trade was handed responsibility for industrial policy, except that concerning labour power. At the end of the War, the National Service Department wing was wound up and its functions passed to the Military Recruitment Department.

In 1947 the ministry introduced the Control of Engagement Order 1947, which limited the rights of workers to leave various industries, and gave labour exchanges the right to direct the unemployed to specific jobs.

In 1959 the department became the Ministry of Labour once more. It was renamed the Department of Employment and Productivity in 1968, and became the Department for Employment in 1970.

== Ministers ==
See Secretary of State for Employment.

== See also ==
- Ministry of Labour Staff Association
- UK labour law
