= Tony Lynes =

British writer and social campaigner (1929–2014)

Tony Lynes (1929 – 12 October 2014) was a British writer and campaigner in the field of social security and pensions.

After qualifying and working as a Chartered Accountant, he was employed as assistant to Professor Richard Titmuss at the London School of Economics from 1958 to 1965. He was recruited by Margaret Herbison in 1965 and worked for a year in the Ministry of Pensions and National Insurance writing a paper on family allowances. He was appointed the first full-time secretary of the Child Poverty Action Group in 1966. He resigned in 1968 and moved to Oxfordshire where he met his wife, Sally. He was probably the first welfare rights officer employed by a local authority working for Oxfordshire Children's Department.

He led the shareholder revolt against the Distillers Company unwillingness to compensate Thalidomide victims. He was a social security adviser to Labour Secretaries of State from 1974 to 1979. The Sun claimed he leaked the cabinet papers covering the debates about Child benefit. In fact it was Malcolm Wicks. He claimed to have tabled more (good) amendments to Social Security legislation than anyone in history.

He is credited with bringing the idea of a welfare rights movement to the UK, after he visited the US. He famously attended parliamentary debates, and on the same day composed press releases at the CPAG office which he then delivered, in person, to Fleet Street - all by bicycle.

He spent his years in retirement working with Southwark Pensioners Action Group, campaigning for a better deal for pensioners. He also founded Southwark Explorers Club and the Welcome Singers.

He died as a result of a being knocked over by a car in Herne Hill on 11 October 2014.

== Publications ==
- Pension Rights and Wrongs. A Critique of the Conservative Scheme (Fabian tract) 1963
- French pensions (Occasional papers on social administration) 1967
- Labour's pension plan (Fabian tract) 1969
- Pension Rights and Wrongs 1969
- Welfare Rights (Fabian tract) 1969
- Penguin Guide to Supplementary Benefits 1981
- The Unemployment Assistance Board: The Origins of Supplementary Benefit 1992
- Our Pensions: A Policy for a Labour Government 1996
