= List of acts of the Parliament of the United Kingdom from 1930 =

This is a complete list of acts of the Parliament of the United Kingdom for the year 1930.

Note that the first parliament of the United Kingdom was held in 1801; parliaments between 1707 and 1800 were either parliaments of Great Britain or of Ireland). For acts passed up until 1707, see the list of acts of the Parliament of England and the list of acts of the Parliament of Scotland. For acts passed from 1707 to 1800, see the list of acts of the Parliament of Great Britain. See also the list of acts of the Parliament of Ireland.

For acts of the devolved parliaments and assemblies in the United Kingdom, see the list of acts of the Scottish Parliament, the list of acts of the Northern Ireland Assembly, and the list of acts and measures of Senedd Cymru; see also the list of acts of the Parliament of Northern Ireland.

The number shown after each act's title is its chapter number. Acts passed before 1963 are cited using this number, preceded by the year(s) of the reign during which the relevant parliamentary session was held; thus the Union with Ireland Act 1800 is cited as "39 & 40 Geo. 3. c. 67", meaning the 67th act passed during the session that started in the 39th year of the reign of George III and which finished in the 40th year of that reign. Note that the modern convention is to use Arabic numerals in citations (thus "41 Geo. 3" rather than "41 Geo. III"). Acts of the last session of the Parliament of Great Britain and the first session of the Parliament of the United Kingdom are both cited as "41 Geo. 3". Acts passed from 1963 onwards are simply cited by calendar year and chapter number.

== 20 & 21 Geo. 5 ==
Continuing the first session of the 35th Parliament of the United Kingdom, which met from 25 June 1929 until 1 August 1930.

This session was also traditionally cited as 20 & 21 G. 5.

=== Public general acts ===
Short title	Citation	Royal assent
Long title
Consolidated Fund (No. 2) Act 1930 (repealed)	20 & 21 Geo. 5. c. 14	6 February 1930
An Act to apply a sum out of the Consolidated Fund to the service of the year ending on the thirty-first day of March, one thousand nine hundred and thirty. (Repealed by Statute Law Revision Act 1950 (14 Geo. 6. c. 6))
Arbitration (Foreign Awards) Act 1930 (repealed)	20 & 21 Geo. 5. c. 15	6 February 1930
An Act to give effect to a certain convention on the execution of Arbitral Awards and to amend subsection (1) of section one of the Arbitration Clauses (Protocol) Act, 1924. (Note: Arbitration Clauses (Protocol) Act 1924 (14 & 15 Geo. 5. c. 39)) (Repealed by Arbitration Act 1950 (14 Geo. 6. c. 27))
Unemployment Insurance Act 1930 (repealed)	20 & 21 Geo. 5. c. 16	6 February 1930
An Act to amend the Unemployment Insurance Acts, 1920 to 1929. (Repealed by Unemployment Insurance Act 1935 (25 & 26 Geo. 5. c. 8))
Poor Law Act 1930 (repealed)	20 & 21 Geo. 5. c. 17	20 March 1930
An Act to consolidate the enactments relating to the relief of the poor in England and Wales. (Repealed by National Assistance Act 1948 (11 & 12 Geo. 6. c. 29))
Consolidated Fund (No. 3) Act 1930 (repealed)	20 & 21 Geo. 5. c. 18	28 March 1930
An Act to apply certain sums out of the Consolidated Fund to the service of the years ending on the thirty-first day of March, one thousand nine hundred and twenty-nine, one thousand nine hundred and thirty and one thousand nine hundred and thirty-one. (Repealed by Statute Law Revision Act 1950 (14 Geo. 6. c. 6))
Unemployment Insurance (No. 2) Act 1930 (repealed)	20 & 21 Geo. 5. c. 19	15 April 1930
An Act to raise to fifty million pounds the limit on the amount of the advances by the Treasury to the Unemployment Fund which may be outstanding during the deficiency period. (Repealed by Unemployment Insurance (No. 3) Act 1930 (20 & 21 Geo. 5. c. 47))
Land Drainage (Scotland) Act 1930	20 & 21 Geo. 5. c. 20	15 April 1930
An Act to make further provision for the drainage of agricultural land in Scotland.
Children (Employment Abroad) Act 1930 (repealed)	20 & 21 Geo. 5. c. 21	15 April 1930
An Act to extend the Children (Employment Abroad) Act, 1913, (Note: Children (Employment Abroad) Act 1913 (3 & 4 Geo. 5. c. 7)) to persons under the age of eighteen years. (Repealed by Children and Young Persons Act 1933 (23 & 24 Geo. 5. c. 12))
Army and Air Force (Annual) Act 1930 (repealed)	20 & 21 Geo. 5. c. 22	29 April 1930
An Act to provide, during Twelve Months, for the Discipline and Regulation of the Army and Air Force. (Repealed by Statute Law Revision Act 1950 (14 Geo. 6. c. 6), Statute Law Revision Act 1953 (2 & 3 Eliz. 2. c. 5) and Revision of the Army and Air Force Acts (Transitional Provisions) Act 1955 (3 & 4 Eliz. 2. c. 20))
Mental Treatment Act 1930 (repealed)	20 & 21 Geo. 5. c. 23	10 July 1930
An Act to amend the Lunacy Acts, 1890 to 1922, and such of the provisions of the Mental Deficiency Acts, 1913 to 1927, as relate to the constitution and organisation of the work of the Board of Control, the exercise of the powers of the Board and the protection of persons putting those Acts into operation. (Repealed by Mental Health Act 1959 (7 & 8 Eliz. 2. c. 72))
Railways (Valuation for Rating) Act 1930 (repealed)	20 & 21 Geo. 5. c. 24	10 July 1930
An Act to amend the law relating to the valuation for rating purposes of hereditaments occupied by railway companies and for purposes connected therewith. (Repealed by Local Government and Rating Act 1997 (c. 29))
Third Parties (Rights against Insurers) Act 1930 (repealed)	20 & 21 Geo. 5. c. 25	10 July 1930
An Act to confer on third parties rights against insurers of third-party risks in the event of the insured becoming insolvent, and in certain other events. (Repealed by Third Parties (Rights against Insurers) Act 2010 (c. 10))
British North America Act 1930 known in Canada as the Constitution Act, 1930	20 & 21 Geo. 5. c. 26	10 July 1930
An Act to confirm and give effect to certain agreements entered into between the Government of the Dominion of Canada and the Governments of the Provinces of Manitoba, British Columbia, Alberta and Saskatchewan respectively.
Appropriation Act 1930 (repealed)	20 & 21 Geo. 5. c. 27	1 August 1930
An Act to apply a sum out of the Consolidated Fund to the service of the year ending on the thirty-first day of March, one thousand nine hundred and thirty-one, and to appropriate the Supplies granted in this Session of Parliament. (Repealed by Statute Law Revision Act 1950 (14 Geo. 6. c. 6))
Finance Act 1930	20 & 21 Geo. 5. c. 28	1 August 1930
An Act to grant certain duties of Customs and Inland Revenue (including Excise), to alter other duties, and to amend the law relating to Customs and Inland Revenue (including Excise) and the National Debt, and to make further provision in connection with finance.
Workmen's Compensation (Silicosis and Asbestosis) Act 1930 (repealed)	20 & 21 Geo. 5. c. 29	1 August 1930
An Act to extend section forty-seven of the Workmen's Compensation Act, 1925, (Note: Workmen's Compensation Act 1925 (15 & 16 Geo. 5. c. 84)) to industries involving exposure to asbestos dust, and to amend the provisions of that section relating to medical arrangements and examinations. (Repealed by National Insurance (Industrial Injuries) Act 1946 (9 & 10 Geo. 6. c. 62))
Air Transport (Subsidy Agreements) Act 1930 (repealed)	20 & 21 Geo. 5. c. 30	1 August 1930
An Act to authorise the President of the Air Council to pay subsidies and furnish facilities to persons maintaining regular services for the carriage by air of passengers, goods and mails. (Repealed by Air Navigation Act 1936 (26 Geo. 5 & 1 Edw. 8. c. 44))
Overseas Trade Act 1930 (repealed)	20 & 21 Geo. 5. c. 31	1 August 1930
An Act to extend the periods during which guarantees may respectively be given and remain in force under the Overseas Trade Acts, 1920 to 1929. (Repealed by Export Guarantees Act 1937 (1 Edw. 8 & 1 Geo. 6. c. 61))
Poor Prisoners' Defence Act 1930 (repealed)	20 & 21 Geo. 5. c. 32	1 August 1930
An Act to make better provision for the defence of poor persons in criminal cases. (Repealed by Criminal Justice Act 1967 (c. 80))
Illegitimate Children (Scotland) Act 1930 (repealed)	20 & 21 Geo. 5. c. 33	1 August 1930
An Act to amend the law as to the duration and recovery of aliment for, and the custody of, illegitimate children in Scotland, and for other purposes connected therewith. (Repealed by Law Reform (Parent and Child) (Scotland) Act 1986 (c. 9))
Coal Mines Act 1930 (repealed)	20 & 21 Geo. 5. c. 34	1 August 1930
An Act to provide for regulating and facilitating the production, supply and sale of coal by owners of coal mines; for the temporary amendment of section three of the Coal Mines Regulation Act, 1908; (Note: Coal Mines Regulation Act 1908 (8 Edw. 7. c. 57)) for the constitution and functions of a Coal Mines National Industrial Board; and for purposes connected with the matters aforesaid. (Repealed by Coal Industry Nationalisation Act 1946 (9 & 10 Geo. 6. c. 59))
Hairdressers' and Barbers' Shops (Sunday Closing) Act 1930 (repealed)	20 & 21 Geo. 5. c. 35	1 August 1930
An Act to provide for the compulsory closing of hairdressers' and barbers' shops on Sundays. (Repealed by Shops Act 1950 (14 Geo. 6. c. 28))
Education (Scotland) Act 1930 (repealed)	20 & 21 Geo. 5. c. 36	1 August 1930
An Act to enable education authorities in Scotland to incur expenditure in supplying milk to children attending schools within their area. (Repealed by Education (Scotland) Act 1945 (8 & 9 Geo. 6. c. 37))
Adoption of Children (Scotland) Act 1930 (repealed)	20 & 21 Geo. 5. c. 37	1 August 1930
An Act to make provision for the adoption of children in Scotland. (Repealed by Statute Law (Repeals) Act 1977 (c. 18))
Navy and Marines (Wills) Act 1930 (repealed)	20 & 21 Geo. 5. c. 38	1 August 1930
An Act to amend the Navy and Marines (Wills) Act, 1865. (Note: Navy and Marines (Wills) Act 1865 (28 & 29 Vict. c. 72)) (Repealed by Navy and Marines (Wills) Act 1953 (1 & 2 Eliz. 2. c. 24))
Housing Act 1930 or the Greenwood Act (repealed)	20 & 21 Geo. 5. c. 39	1 August 1930
An Act to make further and better provision with respect to the clearance or improvement of unhealthy areas, the repair or demolition of insanitary houses and the housing of persons of the working classes; to amend the Housing Act, 1925, (Note: Housing Act 1925 (15 & 16 Geo. 5. c. 14)) the Housing, &c., Act, 1923, (Note: Housing, &c., Act, 1923 (13 & 14 Geo. 5. c. 24)) the Housing (Financial Provisions) Act, 1924, (Note: Housing (Financial Provisions) Act 1924 (14 & 15 Geo. 5. c. 35)) and the other enactments relating to housing subsidies; and for purposes connected with the matters aforesaid. (Repealed by Statute Law (Repeals) Act 1981 (c. 19))
Housing (Scotland) Act 1930 (repealed)	20 & 21 Geo. 5. c. 40	1 August 1930
An Act to make further and better provision with respect to the clearance or improvement of unhealthy areas, the repair, demolition or closing of insanitary houses and the housing of persons of the working classes in Scotland; to amend the Housing (Scotland) Act, 1925, (Note: Housing (Scotland) Act 1925 (15 & 16 Geo. 5. c. 15)) the Housing, &c., Act, 1923, the Housing (Financial Provisions) Act, 1924, and other enactments relating to housing subsidies; and for purposes, connected with the matters aforesaid. (Repealed by Housing (Financial Provisions) (Scotland) Act 1972 (c. 46))
Sea Fisheries Regulation (Expenses) Act 1930 (repealed)	20 & 21 Geo. 5. c. 41	1 August 1930
An Act to provide for the payment of travelling expenses incurred by members of local fisheries committees constituted under the Sea Fisheries Regulation Act, 1888. (Note: Sea Fisheries Regulation Act 1888 (51 & 52 Vict. c. 54)) (Repealed by Sea Fisheries Regulation Act 1966 (c. 38))
Isle of Man (Customs) Act 1930 (repealed)	20 & 21 Geo. 5. c. 42	1 August 1930
An Act to amend the law with respect to Customs in the Isle of Man. (Repealed for the Isle of Man by Customs and Excise etc. Order 1976 (GC No 1/76))
Road Traffic Act 1930	20 & 21 Geo. 5. c. 43	1 August 1930
An Act to make provision for the regulation of traffic on roads and of motor vehicles and otherwise with respect to roads and vehicles thereon, to make provision for the protection of third parties against risks arising out of the use of motor vehicles and in connection with such protection to amend the Assurance Companies Act, 1909 (Note: Assurance Companies Act 1909 (9 Edw. 7. c. 49)) to amend the law with respect to the powers of local authorities to provide public service vehicles, and for other purposes connected with the matters aforesaid.
Land Drainage Act 1930 (repealed)	20 & 21 Geo. 5. c. 44	1 August 1930
An Act to amend and consolidate the enactments relating to the drainage of land, and for purposes in connection with such amendment. (Repealed by Land Drainage Act 1976 (c. 70))
Criminal Appeal (Northern Ireland) Act 1930 (repealed)	20 & 21 Geo. 5. c. 45	1 August 1930
An Act to establish a Court of Criminal Appeal in Northern Ireland and to amend the law relating to appeals in criminal cases in Northern Ireland. (Repealed by Criminal Appeal (Northern Ireland) Act 1968 (c. 21))
British Museum Act 1930 (repealed)	20 & 21 Geo. 5. c. 46	1 August 1930
An Act to relieve the Principal Librarian of the British Museum of the care of the Natural History Departments of the Museum and from liability to enter into a bond for the due discharge of the duties of his office. (Repealed by British Museum Act 1963 (c. 24))
Unemployment Insurance (No. 3) Act 1930 (repealed)	20 & 21 Geo. 5. c. 47	1 August 1930
An Act to raise to sixty million pounds the limit on the amount of the advances by the Treasury to the Unemployment Fund which may be outstanding during the deficiency period. (Repealed by Unemployment Insurance (No. 4) Act 1930 (21 & 22 Geo. 5. c. 3))
London Naval Treaty Act 1930 (repealed)	20 & 21 Geo. 5. c. 48	1 August 1930
An Act to enable effect to be given to a Treaty signed at London on behalf of His Majesty and certain other Powers and to repeal section four of the Treaties of Washington Act, 1922. (Note: Treaties of Washington Act 1922) (Repealed by Statute Law Revision Act 1963 (c. 30))
Public Works Loans Act 1930 (repealed)	20 & 21 Geo. 5. c. 49	1 August 1930
An Act to grant money for the purpose of certain Local Loans out of the Local Loans Fund, and for other purposes relating to Local Loans. (Repealed by Statute Law Revision Act 1950 (14 Geo. 6. c. 6))
Public Works Facilities Act 1930 (repealed)	20 & 21 Geo. 5. c. 50	1 August 1930
An Act to expedite the procedure for empowering local authorities and statutory undertakers to execute works which will contribute to the relief of unemployment; to facilitate the acquisition by such authorities and undertakers of land and easements required for the purposes of their functions; and for purposes connected with the matters aforesaid. (Repealed by Acquisition of Land (Authorisation Procedure) Act 1946 (9 & 10 Geo. 6. c. 49))
Reservoirs (Safety Provisions) Act 1930 (repealed)	20 & 21 Geo. 5. c. 51	1 August 1930
An Act to impose, in the interests of safety, precautions to be observed in the construction, alteration, and use of reservoirs, and to amend the law with respect to liability for damage and injury caused by the escape of water from reservoirs. (Repealed by Reservoirs Act 1975 (c. 23))

=== Local acts ===
Short title	Citation	Royal assent
Long title
Ministry of Health Provisional Order Confirmation (Sheppey Water) Act 1930	20 & 21 Geo. 5. c. xxxix	6 February 1930
An Act to confirm a Provisional Order of the Minister of Health relating to Sheppey Water.
	Sheppey Water Order 1929 (Note: Although passed in 1930, the short title is specified as the Sheppey Water Order 1929.) Provisional Order under the Gas and Water Works Facilities Act 1870 (Note: Gas and Water Works Facilities Act 1870 (33 & 34 Vict. c. 70)) and the Gas and Water Works Facilities Act 1870 Amendment Act 1873 (Note: Gas and Water Works Facilities Act 1870 Amendment Act 1873 (36 & 37 Vict. c. 89)) for empowering the Sheppey Water and Lighting Company Limited to construct and maintain waterworks and to supply water in parts of the Rural District of Sheppey in the County of Kent.	
Ministry of Health Provisional Orders Confirmation (No. 13) Act 1930	20 & 21 Geo. 5. c. xl	6 February 1930
An Act to confirm certain Provisional Orders of the Minister of Health relating to Exeter and Romford.
	Exeter Order 1929 (Note: Although passed in 1930, the short title is specified as the Exeter Order 1929.) Provisional Order to enable the Exeter Corporation to put in force the compulsory clauses of the Lands Clauses Acts.	
	Romford Order 1929 (Note: Although passed in 1930, the short title is specified as the Romford Order 1929.) Provisional Order to enable the Urban District Council of Romford to put in force the compulsory clauses of the Lands Clauses Acts.	
Ministry of Health Provisional Order Confirmation (Gosport Extension) Act 1930	20 & 21 Geo. 5. c. xli	20 March 1930
An Act to confirm a Provisional Order of the Minister of Health relating to Gosport.
	Gosport (Extension) Order 1929 (Note: Although passed in 1930, the short title is specified as the Gosport (Extension) Order 1929.) Provisional Order extending a Borough.	
Ministry of Health Provisional Order Confirmation (Fylde Water Board) Act 1930 (repealed)	20 & 21 Geo. 5. c. xlii	20 March 1930
An Act to confirm a Provisional Order of the Minister of Health relating to the Fylde Water Board. (Repealed by County of Lancashire Act 1984 (c. xxi))
	Fylde Water Board Order 1929 (Note: Although passed in 1930, the short title is specified as the Fylde Water Board Order 1929.) Provisional Order amending a local Act. (Note: Fylde Water Board Act 1925 (15 & 16 Geo. 5. c. lv))	
Ministry of Health Provisional Order Confirmation (Bradford Extension) Act 1930 (repealed)	20 & 21 Geo. 5. c. xliii	20 March 1930
An Act to confirm a Provisional Order of the Minister of Health relating to Bradford. (Repealed by West Yorkshire Act 1980 (c. xiv))
	Bradford (Extension) Order 1929 (Note: Although passed in 1930, the short title is specified as the Bradford (Extension) Order 1929.) Provisional Order made in pursuance of the Local Government Act 1888 (Note: Local Government Act 1888 (51 & 52 Vict. c. 41)) for the extension of a County Borough.	
Rothesay Tramways and Omnibuses Order Confirmation Act 1930	20 & 21 Geo. 5. c. xliv	20 March 1930
An Act to confirm a Provisional Order under the Private Legislation Procedure (Scotland) Act 1899 (Note: Private Legislation Procedure (Scotland) Act 1899 (62 & 63 Vict. c. 47)) relating to Rothesay Tramways and Omnibuses.
	Rothesay Tramways and Omnibuses Order 1930 Provisional Order to make provision as to the temporary discontinuance and permanent abandonment of the tramways of the Rothesay Tramways Company Limited to authorise the Company to run omnibuses in substitution for tramcars and for other purposes.	
Ministry of Health Provisional Order Confirmation Conway and Penmaenmawr Joint Hospital District Act 1930	20 & 21 Geo. 5. c. xlv	28 March 1930
An Act to confirm a Provisional Order of the Minister of Health relating to Conway and Penmaenmawr Joint Hospital District.
	Conway and Penmaenmawr Joint Hospital District Order 1930 Provisional Order altering the Conway and Penmaenmawr Joint Hospital Order 1910.	
Dundee Corporation (General Powers) Order Confirmation Act 1930 (repealed)	20 & 21 Geo. 5. c. xlvi	28 March 1930
An Act to confirm a Provisional Order under the Private Legislation Procedure (Scotland) Act 1899 relating to Dundee Corporation (General Powers). (Repealed by North of Scotland Electricity Order Confirmation Act 1958 (7 & 8 Eliz. 2. c. ii))
	Dundee Corporation (General Powers) Order 1930 Provisional Order to confer powers on the Dundee Corporation as to Belmont Castle and Estate to make certain provisions in respect of the municipal administration and the water undertaking of the city and for other purposes.	
Edinburgh Corporation Order Confirmation Act 1930 (repealed)	20 & 21 Geo. 5. c. xlvii	15 April 1930
An Act to confirm a Provisional Order under the Private Legislation Procedure (Scotland) Act 1899 relating to Edinburgh Corporation. (Repealed by Edinburgh Corporation Order Confirmation Act 1964 (c. xli))
	Edinburgh Corporation Order 1930 Provisional Order to authorise the Corporation of the City and royal burgh of Edinburgh to acquire lands to amend the superannuation scheme of the Corporation to amend the Edinburgh. Municipal and Police Acts to borrow money and for other purposes.	
Renfrewshire Upper District (Eastwood and Mearns) Water Order Confirmation Act 1930	20 & 21 Geo. 5. c. xlviii	15 April 1930
An Act to confirm a Provisional Order under the Private Legislation Procedure (Scotland) Act 1899 relating to Renfrewshire Upper District (Eastwood and Mearns) Water.
	Renfrewshire Upper District (Eastwood and Mearns) Water Order 1930 Provisional Order to revive the powers and extend the time for enabling the County Council of the County of Renfrew to construct the Lochcraig Reservoir authorised by the Renfrewshire Upper District (Eastwood and Mearns) Water Act 1907 (Note: Renfrewshire Upper District (Eastwood and Mearns) Water Act 1907 (7 Edw. 7. c. cxliii)) and for other purposes.	
London, Midland and Scottish Railway (Hotel Water) Order Confirmation Act 1930	20 & 21 Geo. 5. c. xlix	15 April 1930
An Act to confirm a Provisional Order under the Private Legislation Procedure (Scotland) Act 1899 relating to the London Midland and Scottish Railway (Hotel Water).
	London, Midland and Scottish Railway (Hotel Water) Order 1930 Provisional Order to authorise the London Midland and Scottish Railway Company to construct waterworks and other works to acquire lands and for other purposes.	
Ministry of Health Provisional Orders Confirmation (Barry and Scarborough) Act 1930	20 & 21 Geo. 5. c. l	15 April 1930
An Act to confirm certain Provisional Orders of the Minister of Health relating to Barry and Scarborough.
	Barry Order 1930 Provisional Order altering the Barry Order 1927.	
	Scarborough Order 1930 Provisional Order altering the Scarborough Corporation Act 1925. (Note: Scarborough Corporation Act 1925 (15 & 16 Geo. 5. c. cv))	
United Kingdom Temperance and General Provident Institution Act 1930 (repealed)	20 & 21 Geo. 5. c. li	15 April 1930
An Act to confer further powers upon the United Kingdom Temperance and General Provident Institution and for other purposes. (Repealed by United Kingdom Temperance and General Provident Institution Act 1974 (c. x))
Portsmouth Corporation Act 1930	20 & 21 Geo. 5. c. lii	15 April 1930
An Act to empower the lord mayor aldermen and citizens of the city of Portsmouth to acquire lands compulsorily and to establish thereon an aerodrome undertaking to confer powers upon them with respect to their tramways and electricity undertakings and for other purposes.
South Staffordshire Mond Gas Act 1930	20 & 21 Geo. 5. c. liii	15 April 1930
An Act to amend certain provisions relating to the sale of gas by the South Staffordshire Mond Gas Company and for other purposes.
Liverpool Corporation (Works) Act 1930	20 & 21 Geo. 5. c. liv	15 April 1930
An Act to authorise the corporation of Liverpool to construct street works a new tramway a storage reservoir and other works to confer further powers upon them with respect to their waterworks undertaking and for other purposes.
London and North Eastern Railway (Works) Act 1930	20 & 21 Geo. 5. c. lv	15 April 1930
An Act to empower the London and North Eastern Railway Company to construct new railways widenings and other works and to acquire lands to extend the time for the completion of certain railways and for other purposes.
Rochdale Corporation Water Act 1930	20 & 21 Geo. 5. c. lvi	15 April 1930
An Act to empower the Corporation of Rochdale to construct additional waterworks to make further provision with respect to the water undertaking of the Corporation and for other purposes.
Chester Waterworks Act 1930	20 & 21 Geo. 5. c. lvii	15 April 1930
An Act to authorise the Chester Waterworks Company to construct new works and to raise additional capital to extend the limits of supply of the Company and for other purposes.
Milford Haven Urban District Council Act 1930	20 & 21 Geo. 5. c. lviii	15 April 1930
An Act to empower the urban district council of Milford Haven to construct additional waterworks and for other purposes.
Shakespeare Birthplace, &c. Trust (Amendment) Act 1930 (repealed)	20 & 21 Geo. 5. c. lix	15 April 1930
An Act to confer further powers on the trustees and guardians of Shakespeare's Birthplace to amend the Shakespeare Birthplace &c. Trust Act 1891 (Note: Shakespeare Birthplace, &c., Trust Act 1891 (54 & 55 Vict. c. iii)) and for other purposes. (Repealed by Shakespeare Birthplace, &c., Trust Act 1961 (9 & 10 Eliz. 2. c. xxxviii))
Bromborough Dock Act 1930 (repealed)	20 & 21 Geo. 5. c. lx	15 April 1930
An Act to extend the periods limited for making and completing works authorised by the Bromborough Dock Act 1923 (Note: Bromborough Dock Act 1923 (13 & 14 Geo. 5. c. lxxii)) and to provide for the abandonment of part of Work No. 4 by that Act authorised. (Repealed by Bromborough Dock Act 1986 (c. xviii))
East Surrey Water Act 1930	20 & 21 Geo. 5. c. lxi	4 June 1930
An Act to provide for the transfer to the East Surrey Water Company of the undertakings of the Limpsfield and Oxted Water Company and the Chelsham and Woldingham Waterworks Company Limited to extend the area of supply of the East Surrey Water Company and authorise them to raise additional capital and for other purposes.
Selsey Water Act 1930 (repealed)	20 & 21 Geo. 5. c. lxii	4 June 1930
An Act to make further provision as to the supply of water in bulk by the Chichester Corporation to the Selsey Water Company to confer further powers on the Company and for other purposes. (Repealed by Portsmouth & Gosport Water (Regnum Area) Order 1963 (SI 1963/1333))
Bristol Corporation (No. 1) Act 1930	20 & 21 Geo. 5. c. lxiii	4 June 1930
An Act to authorise the lord mayor aldermen and burgesses of the city of Bristol to execute street works and to acquire lands for those works and for the erection of a maternity clinic and for other purposes.
Liverpool Exchange Act 1930 (repealed)	20 & 21 Geo. 5. c. lxiv	4 June 1930
An Act to sub-divide the shares in the issued capital of the Liverpool Exchange Company to confer further powers upon that Company to make further provisions with respect to the Exchange news room and for other purposes. (Repealed by Liverpool Exchange Act 1988 (c. ix))
Wakefield Corporation Act 1930 (repealed)	20 & 21 Geo. 5. c. lxv	4 June 1930
An Act to confer further borrowing powers upon the mayor aldermen and citizens of the city of Wakefield and for other purposes. (Repealed by West Yorkshire Act 1980 (c. xiv))
Derby Corporation Act 1930	20 & 21 Geo. 5. c. lxvi	4 June 1930
An Act to authorise the mayor aldermen and burgesses of the borough of Derby to construct river improvements and street works to provide and work trolley vehicles and for other purposes.
Portsmouth Water Act 1930	20 & 21 Geo. 5. c. lxvii	4 June 1930
An Act to change the name of the Borough of Portsmouth Waterworks Company to extend their limits for the supply of water to consolidate and convert their ordinary capital to authorise them to raise additional capital and for other purposes.
Great Western Railway Act 1930	20 & 21 Geo. 5. c. lxviii	4 June 1930
An Act for conferring further powers upon the Great Western Railway Company in respect of their own undertaking and upon that company and the London Midland and Scottish Railway Company in respect of an undertaking in which they are jointly interested and for other purposes.
Tees Valley Water Act 1930	20 & 21 Geo. 5. c. lxix	4 June 1930
An Act to authorise the Tees Valley Water Board to construct additional waterworks to confer further powers upon the Board and for other purposes.
Scottish Central Electric Power Act 1930 (repealed)	20 & 21 Geo. 5. c. lxx	4 June 1930
An Act to authorise the Scottish Central Electric Power Company to raise additional capital to confer further powers upon the Company and for other purposes. (Repealed by South of Scotland Electricity Order Confirmation Act 1956 (4 & 5 Eliz. 2. c. xciv))
Milford Docks Act 1930 (repealed)	20 & 21 Geo. 5. c. lxxi	4 June 1930
An Act to convert and consolidate the capital of the Milford Docks Company to confer further powers on that Company and for other purposes. (Repealed by Milford Docks Act 1953 (1 & 2 Eliz. 2. c. x))
Malvern Hills Act 1930	20 & 21 Geo. 5. c. lxxii	4 June 1930
An Act to confer further powers upon the Malvern Hills Conservators and for other purposes.
Barnsley and District Light Railways (Abandonment) Act 1930 (repealed)	20 & 21 Geo. 5. c. lxxiii	4 June 1930
An Act to provide for the abandonment of the railways authorised by the Barnsley and District Light Railway Order 1900 and for other purposes. (Repealed by Statute Law (Repeals) Act 1989 (c. 43))
Faversham Oyster Fishery Act 1930	20 & 21 Geo. 5. c. lxxiv	4 June 1930
An Act to incorporate and confer powers upon the Faversham Oyster Fishery Company to provide for the transfer to and vesting in that Company of the undertaking of the Company or Fraternity of Free Fishermen and Dredgermen of the Manor and Hundred of Faversham in the County of Kent to dissolve the said Company or Fraternity and for other purposes.
Falmouth Water Act 1930	20 & 21 Geo. 5. c. lxxv	4 June 1930
An Act to confer further powers on the Falmouth Waterworks Company and for other purposes.
Borough Market (Southwark) Act 1930	20 & 21 Geo. 5. c. lxxvi	4 June 1930
An Act to incorporate the Trustees of the Borough Market (Southwark) to confer further powers upon the Trustees as incorporated and for other purposes.
Great Western Railway (Docks) Act 1930	20 & 21 Geo. 5. c. lxxvii	4 June 1930
An Act for conferring further powers upon the Great Western Railway Company in respect of their docks at Swansea and Port Talbot respectively and for other purposes.
Newport Corporation (No. 1) Act 1930	20 & 21 Geo. 5. c. lxxviii	4 June 1930
An Act to authorise the construction of street works the deviation of a railway and the closing of part of a canal in the county borough of Newport to authorise the mayor aldermen and burgesses of the borough to provide and work trolley vehicles to make further provision for the finance of the borough and for other purposes.
Newport Corporation (No. 2) Act 1930	20 & 21 Geo. 5. c. lxxix	4 June 1930
An Act to enlarge the powers of the mayor aldermen and burgesses of the county borough of Newport with respect to their water electricity tramway and omnibus undertakings to make further provision for the health local government improvement and finance of the borough and for other purposes.
Metropolitan Railway Act 1930	20 & 21 Geo. 5. c. lxxx	4 June 1930
An Act to authorise the Metropolitan Railway Company to construct new railways and to acquire lands to authorise the Company to raise further moneys to confer further powers on the Company and for other purposes.
Kingsbridge and Salcombe Water Board Act 1930	20 & 21 Geo. 5. c. lxxxi	4 June 1930
An Act to constitute and incorporate a joint board consisting of representatives of the urban district councils of Kingsbridge and Salcombe with power to construct works for intercepting and distributing the waters of the Bala Brook and for other purposes.
Birkenhead Corporation Act 1930	20 & 21 Geo. 5. c. lxxxii	4 June 1930
An Act to empower the corporation of Birkenhead to execute street improvements to confer further powers upon them with respect to their tramway and electricity undertakings to make better provision for the health local government and finance of the borough and for other purposes.
East Kent District Water Act 1930	20 & 21 Geo. 5. c. lxxxiii	4 June 1930
An Act for authorising the East Kent District Water Company to construct new waterworks for extending their limits for the supply of water for conferring further powers upon the Company and for other purposes.
Mid Kent Water Act 1930	20 & 21 Geo. 5. c. lxxxiv	4 June 1930
An Act for authorising the Mid Kent Water Company to construct new waterworks and to raise additional capital for extending their limits for the supply of water for conferring further powers upon the Company and for other purposes.
Sutton Coldfield Corporation Act 1930 (repealed)	20 & 21 Geo. 5. c. lxxxv	4 June 1930
An Act to extend the boundaries of the borough of Sutton Coldfield to make further and better provision for the improvement health and local government of the borough and for other purposes. (Repealed by West Midlands County Council Act 1980 (c. xi))
Coventry Corporation Act 1930	20 & 21 Geo. 5. c. lxxxvi	4 June 1930
An Act to empower the mayor aldermen and citizens of the city of Coventry to acquire lands and construct street works and a bye-pass road (Note: A45 Coventry Southern Bypass, from Allesley and Toll Bar End, Willenhall.) to empower the Corporation to construct an improvement of the river Sherbourne and an extension of their Windmill Road cemetery to make special provision with regard to the cost of constructing the bye-pass road to confer further powers upon the Corporation with regard to the health and good government of the city and for other purposes.
Croydon Corporation Act 1930	20 & 21 Geo. 5. c. lxxxvii	4 June 1930
An Act to empower the mayor aldermen and burgesses of the county borough of Croydon to execute street works and to acquire lands for those and other purposes to confer further powers upon the Corporation in regard to their water undertaking and the health local government and improvement of the borough and for other purposes.
London Electric Metropolitan District Central London and City and South London Railway Companies Act 1930	20 & 21 Geo. 5. c. lxxxviii	4 June 1930
An Act to empower the London Electric Railway Company to construct new railways subways and works and to raise additional moneys to empower the Metropolitan District Railway Company to construct widenings of portions of its railway and to raise additional moneys to empower the Central London Railway Company to construct subways and works and to raise additional moneys to empower the City and South London Railway Company and the Metropolitan District Railway Company to construct a subway and to confer further powers on the said and other companies and for other purposes.
Tees (Newport) Bridge Act 1930 (repealed)	20 & 21 Geo. 5. c. lxxxix	4 June 1930
An Act to empower the mayor aldermen and burgesses of the county borough of Middlesbrough and the county council of the administrative county of Durham to construct a new bridge over the river Tees and to execute other works in connection therewith to provide for the vesting of the said bridge and approaches and for other purposes. (Repealed by Teesside Corporation Act 1971 (c. xvii))
Ministry of Health Provisional Order Confirmation (Blandford Forum Extension) Act 1930	20 & 21 Geo. 5. c. xc	4 June 1930
An Act to confirm a Provisional Order of the Minister of Health relating to Blandford Forum.
	Blandford Forum (Extension) Order 1930 Provisional Order extending a Borough.	
Ministry of Health Provisional Orders Confirmation (Guildford and West Kent Main Sewerage District) Act 1930	20 & 21 Geo. 5. c. xci	4 June 1930
An Act to confirm certain Provisional Orders of the Minister of Health relating to Guildford and the West Kent Main Sewerage District.
	Guildford Order 1930 Provisional Order amending the Guildford Corporation Act 1926. (Note: Guildford Corporation Act 1926 (16 & 17 Geo. 5. c. lxxxv))	
	West Kent Main Sewerage Order 1930 Provisional Order for altering certain Local Acts and Confirming Acts.	
Ministry of Health Provisional Orders Confirmation (Fylde Water Board, Oldham and Rochdale) Act 1930	20 & 21 Geo. 5. c. xcii	4 June 1930
An Act to confirm certain Provisional Orders of the Minister of Health relating to the Fylde Water Board and Oldham and Rochdale.
	Fylde Water (Road Works) Order 1930 Provisional Order partially repealing and amending certain local Acts.	
	Oldham and Rochdale Order 1930 Provisional Order amending a local Act. (Note: Oldham and Rochdale Corporations Water Act 1923 (13 & 14 Geo. 5. c. lxxvii))	
Kirkcaldy Corporation Order Confirmation Act 1930 (repealed)	20 & 21 Geo. 5. c. xciii	4 June 1930
An Act to confirm a Provisional Order under the Private Legislation Procedure (Scotland) Act 1899 relating to Kirkcaldy Corporation. (Repealed by Kirkcaldy Corporation Order Confirmation Act 1939 (2 & 3 Geo. 6. c. vi))
	Kirkcaldy Corporation Order 1930 Provisional Order to extend the boundaries of the royal burgh of Kirkcaldy to transfer and to vest in the town council of the extended burgh the undertaking of the Kirkcaldy Waterworks Commissioners and to dissolve the said commissioners to extend the limits of compulsory water supply and for other purposes.	
Severn District Fisheries Provisional Order Confirmation Act 1930	20 & 21 Geo. 5. c. xciv	4 June 1930
An Act to confirm a Provisional Order under the Salmon and Freshwater Fisheries Act 1923 (Note: Salmon and Freshwater Fisheries Act 1923 (13 & 14 Geo. 5. c. 16)) relating to the River Severn and other waters.
	Severn District Fishery Order 1929 (Note: Although passed in 1930, the short title is specified as the Severn District Fishery Order 1929.) Severn District Fishery Order 1929.	
Coquet Fisheries Provisional Order Confirmation Act 1930	20 & 21 Geo. 5. c. xcv	4 June 1930
An Act to confirm a Provisional Order under the Salmon and Freshwater Fisheries Act 1923 relating to the River Coquet and other waters.
	River Coquet Fishery District Order 1929 (Note: Although passed in 1930, the short title is specified as the River Coquet Fishery District Order 1929.) River Coquet Fishery District Order 1929.	
Boston Oyster Fishery Order Confirmation Act 1930	20 & 21 Geo. 5. c. xcvi	4 June 1930
An Act to confirm a Provisional Order made by the Ministry of Agriculture and Fisheries under the Sea Fisheries Act 1868 (Note: Sea Fisheries Act 1868 (31 & 32 Vict. c. 45)) relating to an Oyster and Mussel Fishery in Boston Deeps and an Oyster Mussel and Cockle Fishery in other parts of the estuary of the Wash.
	Boston Fishery Order 1930 An Order for the Regulation of an Oyster and Mussel Fishery in Boston Deeps being a portion of the Estuary of the Wash in the County of Lincoln and for the maintenance of a several Oyster Mussel and Cockle Fishery on the west side of the said Estuary.	
Ministry of Health Provisional Orders Confirmation (Ashby-de-la-Zouch and Slough) Act 1930	20 & 21 Geo. 5. c. xcvii	10 July 1930
An Act to confirm certain Provisional Orders of the Minister of Health relating to Ashby-de-la-Zouch and Slough.
	Ashby-de-la-Zouch Order 1930 Provisional Order to enable the Urban District Council of Ashby-de-la-Zouch to put in force the compulsory clauses of the Lands Clauses Acts.	
	Slough Order 1930 Provisional Order to enable the Urban District Council of Slough to put in force the compulsory clauses of the Lands Clauses Acts.	
Ministry of Health Provisional Orders Confirmation (Aylesbury Chesham and Guildford) Act 1930	20 & 21 Geo. 5. c. xcviii	10 July 1930
An Act to confirm certain Provisional Orders of the Minister of Health relating to Aylesbury Chesham and Guildford.
	Aylesham Order 1930 Provisional Order to cnable the Aylesbury Corporation to put in force the compulsory clauses of the Lands Clauses Acts.	
	Chesham Order 1930 Provisional Order to enable the Urban District Council of Chesham to put in force the compulsory clauses of the Lands Clauses Acts.	
	Guildford (Acquisition of Lands) Order 1930 Provisional Order to enable the Guildford Corporation to put in force the compulsory clauses of the Lands Clauses Acts.	
Ministry of Health Provisional Orders Confirmation (Hexham) Act 1930	20 & 21 Geo. 5. c. xcix	10 July 1930
An Act to confirm a Provisional Order of the Minister of Health relating to Hexham.
	Hexham Order 1930 Provisional Order altering a local Act (Note: Hexham Local Board (Water) Act 1888 (51 & 52 Vict. c. cliv)) and altering or repealing provisional orders.	
Ministry of Health Provisional Orders Confirmation (Chippenham and Grimsby) Act 1930	20 & 21 Geo. 5. c. c	10 July 1930
An Act to confirm certain Provisional Orders of the Minister of Health relating to Chippenham and Grimsby.
	Chippenham Order 1930 Provisional Order dissolving the Corsham Special Drainage District.	
	Grimsby Order 1930 Provisional Order altering and amending a local Act. (Note: Great Grimsby Improvement Act 1853 (16 & 17 Vict. c. xxx))	
Ministry of Health Provisional Orders Confirmation (Brentford and Chiswick and Ramsgate) Act 1930	20 & 21 Geo. 5. c. ci	10 July 1930
An Act to confirm certain Provisional Orders of the Minister of Health relating to Brentford and Chiswick and Ramsgate.
	Brentford and Chiswick Order 1930 Provisional Order for partially repealing a local Act. (Note: Chiswick Improvement Act 1858 (21 & 22 Vict. c. lxix))	
	Ramsgate Order 1930 Provisional Order amending the Ramsgate Corporation Act 1922. (Note: Ramsgate Corporation Act 1922 (12 & 13 Geo. 5. c. lxxxv))	
Ministry of Health Provisional Orders Confirmation (Bognor Regis and Chepping Wycombe) Act 1930	20 & 21 Geo. 5. c. cii	10 July 1930
An Act to confirm certain Provisional Orders of the Minister of Health relating to Bognor Regis and Chepping Wycombe.
	Bognor Regis (Acquisition of Lands) Order 1930 Provisional Order to enable the Urban District Council of Bognor Regis to put in force the compulsory clauses of the Lands Clauses Acts.	
	Chepping Wycombe Order 1930 Provisional Order to enable the Chepping Wycombe Corporation to put in force the compulsory clauses of the Lands Clauses Acts.	
Ministry of Health Provisional Orders Confirmation (Cranbrook District Water and Sevenoaks Water) Act 1930	20 & 21 Geo. 5. c. ciii	10 July 1930
An Act to confirm certain Provisional Orders of the Minister of Health relating to Cranbrook District Water and Sevenoaks Water.
	Cranbrook District Water Order 1930 Provisional Order under the Gas and Water Works Facilities Act 1870 and the Gas and Water Works Facilities Act 1870 Amendment Act 1873 empowering the Cranbrook District Water Company to increase their borrowing powers and for other purposes.	
	Sevenoaks Water Order 1930 Provisional Order under the Gas and Water Works Facilities Act 1870 and the Gas and Water Works Facilities Act 1870 Amendment Act 1873 conferring further powers upon the Sevenoaks Waterworks Company.	
Ministry of Health Provisional Order Confirmation (Hendon Rural) Act 1930	20 & 21 Geo. 5. c. civ	10 July 1930
An Act to confirm a Provisional Order of the Minister of Health relating to Hendon Rural District.
	Hendon (Rural) Order 1930 Provisional Order to enable the Rural District Council of Hendon to put in force the compulsory clauses of the Lands Clauses Acts.	
Ministry of Health Provisional Orders Confirmation (Kidderminster and Llanelly) Act 1930 (repealed)	20 & 21 Geo. 5. c. cv	10 July 1930
An Act to confirm certain Provisional Orders of the Minister of Health relating to Kidderminster and Llanelly. (Repealed by Statute Law (Repeals) Act 1998 (c. 43))
	Kidderminster Order 1930 Provisional Order to enable the Kidderminster Corporation to put into force the compulsory clauses of the Lands Clauses Acts.	
	Llanelly Order 1930 Provisional Order to enable the Llanelly Corporation to put in force the compulsory clauses of the Lands Clauses Acts.	
Maidstone Corporation (Trolley Vehicles) Order Confirmation Act 1930	20 & 21 Geo. 5. c. cvi	10 July 1930
An Act to confirm a Provisional Order made by the Minister of Transport under the Maidstone Corporation Act 1923 (Note: Maidstone Corporation Act 1923 (13 & 14 Geo. 5. c. xxxi)) relating to Maidstone Corporation trolley vehicles.
	Maidstone Corporation (Trolley Vehicles) Order 1930 Order authorising the mayor aldermen and burgesses of the borough of Maidstone to provide maintain and use trolley vehicles upon a route in the borough of Maidstone.	
Board of Education Scheme (Devon Crediton Exhibition Foundation) Confirmation Act 1930	20 & 21 Geo. 5. c. cvii	10 July 1930
An Act to confirm a Scheme approved and certified by the Board of Education under the Charitable Trusts Acts 1853 to 1925 relating to the Crediton Exhibition Foundation in the Ancient Parish of Crediton in the County of Devon.
	Scheme approved and certified by the Board of Education under the Charitable Trusts Acts 1853 to 1925 in the matter of the Crediton Exhibition Foundation.	
Burnley Corporation Act 1930 (repealed)	20 & 21 Geo. 5. c. cviii	10 July 1930
An Act to repeal and amend provisions of the local Acts of the mayor aldermen and burgesses of the borough of Burnley and for other purposes. (Repealed by County of Lancashire Act 1984 (c. xxi))
Reading Corporation Act 1930 (repealed)	20 & 21 Geo. 5. c. cix	10 July 1930
An Act to authorise the mayor aldermen and burgesses of the borough of Reading to acquire the undertaking of the Tilehurst Pangbourne and District Water Company Limited to authorise the said mayor aldermen and burgesses to execute waterworks and street works and for other purposes: (Repealed by Berkshire Act 1986 (c. ii))
Lochaber Water Power Act 1930	20 & 21 Geo. 5. c. cx	10 July 1930
An Act to extend the period for the completion of certain works authorised by the Lochaber Water Power Act 1921 (Note: Lochaber Water Power Act 1921 (11 & 12 Geo. 5. c. xliv)) to extend the area of supply of and confer further powers upon the Lochaber Power Company and for other purposes.
Lancaster Corporation Act 1930	20 & 21 Geo. 5. c. cxi	10 July 1930
An Act to make further provision with respect to the water electricity and omnibus undertakings of the mayor aldermen and burgesses of the borough of Lancaster and for other purposes.
Liverpool Corporation (General Powers) Act 1930	20 & 21 Geo. 5. c. cxii	10 July 1930
An Act to confer further powers upon the corporation of Liverpool with respect to their tramways and electricity undertakings to make better provision for the health and local government of the city and for other purposes.
London, Midland and Scottish Railway (No. 1) Act 1930	20 & 21 Geo. 5. c. cxiii	10 July 1930
An Act to empower the London Midland and Scottish Railway Company to construct a railway and works and to acquire lands and for other purposes.
Nottingham Corporation Act 1930 (repealed)	20 & 21 Geo. 5. c. cxiv	10 July 1930
An Act to authorise the lord mayor aldermen and citizens of the city of Nottingham and county of the same city to run trolley vehicles on existing and authorised tramway routes and on further routes within the city and to abandon and discontinue tramways and for other purposes. (Repealed by Statute Law (Repeals) Act 1995 (c. 44))
Epsom Rural District Council Act 1930 (repealed)	20 & 21 Geo. 5. c. cxv	10 July 1930
An Act to confer further powers upon the rural district council of Epsom for the regulation and control of the development of building estates and the laying out of new streets and in regard to buildings sewers and drains and for other purposes. (Repealed by Surrey Act 1985 (c. iii))
Guildford Rural District Council Act 1930 (repealed)	20 & 21 Geo. 5. c. cxvi	10 July 1930
An Act to confer further powers upon the rural district council of Guildford for the regulation and control of the development of building estates and the laying out of new streets and in regard to buildings sewers and drains and for other purposes. (Repealed by Surrey Act 1985 (c. iii))
Stockton-on-Tees Corporation (Works) Act 1930	20 & 21 Geo. 5. c. cxvii	10 July 1930
An Act to empower the mayor aldermen and burgesses of the borough of Stockton-on-Tees to construct street works and railways and for other purposes.
Royal Exchange Assurance Act 1930	20 & 21 Geo. 5. c. cxviii	10 July 1930
An Act to confer further powers upon the Royal Exchange Assurance.
Leeds Corporation Act 1930	20 & 21 Geo. 5. c. cxix	10 July 1930
An Act to increase the number of the wards of the city of Leeds to empower the lord mayor aldermen and citizens of that city to construct street improvements and tramways and to make further provision in regard to the several undertakings of the said lord mayor aldermen and citizens and for the health local government and improvement of the city and for other purposes.
West Bromwich Corporation Act 1930 (repealed)	20 & 21 Geo. 5. c. cxx	10 July 1930
An Act to extend the boundary of the borough of West Bromwich to empower the mayor aldermen and burgesses of the borough to purchase tramways outside the borough to acquire lands to make further provision with regard to their tramway and omnibus undertakings and the health local government and improvement of the borough and for other purposes. (Repealed by West Bromwich Corporation Act 1969 (c. lix))
Darlington Corporation Act 1930	20 & 21 Geo. 5. c. cxxi	10 July 1930
An Act to extend the boundaries of the borough of Darlington to empower the corporation of Darlington to construct a weir across the river Tees and street improvements to confer further powers upon them with regard to their water electricity and markets undertakings and the health local government and improvement of the borough and for other purposes.
Rochdale Corporation (General Powers) Act 1930	20 & 21 Geo. 5. c. cxxii	10 July 1930
An Act to authorise the abandonment of certain tramways in and near Rochdale and the substitution of omnibus services therefor to make further provision with respect to the tramway and electricity undertakings of the Corporation of Rochdale and for other purposes.
London County Council (Money) Act 1930 (repealed)	20 & 21 Geo. 5. c. cxxiii	10 July 1930
An Act to regulate the expenditure on capital account and lending of money by the London County Council during the financial period from the first day of April one thousand nine hundred and thirty to the thirtieth day of September one thousand nine hundred and thirty-one and for other purposes. (Repealed by London County Council (Loans) Act 1955 (4 & 5 Eliz. 2. c. xxvi))
Fife Electric Power Act 1930 (repealed)	20 & 21 Geo. 5. c. cxxiv	10 July 1930
An Act to authorise the Fife Electric Power Company to raise additional capital to confer further powers upon the Company and for other purposes. (Repealed by South of Scotland Electricity Order Confirmation Act 1956 (4 & 5 Eliz. 2. c. xciv))
Wednesbury Corporation Act 1930	20 & 21 Geo. 5. c. cxxv	10 July 1930
An Act to extend the boundaries of the borough of Wednesbury to confer further powers on the Wednesbury Corporation to make further and better provision for the improvement health and local government of the borough and for other purposes.
Hastings Tramways Company (Trolley Vehicles) Act 1930 (repealed)	20 & 21 Geo. 5. c. cxxvi	10 July 1930
An Act to authorise the Hastings Tramways Company to run trolley vehicles on additional routes and for other purposes. (Repealed by Hastings Tramways Act 1957 (5 & 6 Eliz. 2. c. xxxvi))
Sidmouth Electricity Act 1930	20 & 21 Geo. 5. c. cxxvii	10 July 1930
An Act to provide for the transfer to the East Devon Electricity Company Limited of the electricity undertaking of the urban district council of Sidmouth to confer further powers on the Company and for other purposes.
Brighton and Hove Gas Act 1930	20 & 21 Geo. 5. c. cxxviii	10 July 1930
An Act to confer further powers upon the Brighton and Hove General Gas Company and for other purposes.
Clacton-on-Sea Pier Act 1930	20 & 21 Geo. 5. c. cxxix	10 July 1930
An Act to authorise the widening of the existing pier in and adjoining the urban district of Clacton in the county of Essex and for other purposes.
Llanelly District Traction Act 1930	20 & 21 Geo. 5. c. cxxx	10 July 1930
An Act to authorise the Llanelly and District Electric Supply Company Limited to abandon their light railways and provide and run trolley vehicles and omnibuses and for other purposes.
Invergordon Water Supply Act 1930	20 & 21 Geo. 5. c. cxxxi	1 August 1930
An Act to confirm certain agreements entered into by the Admiralty, the Town Council of the burgh of Invergordon, and the County Council of the County of Ross and Cromarty.
Aberdeen Corporation Order Confirmation Act 1930 (repealed)	20 & 21 Geo. 5. c. cxxxii	1 August 1930
An Act to confirm a Provisional Order under the Private Legislation Procedure (Scotland) Act 1899 relating to Aberdeen Corporation. (Repealed by Aberdeen Corporation (Administration Finance, &c.) Order Confirmation Act 1940 (3 & 4 Geo. 6. c. iii))
	Aberdeen Corporation Order 1930 Provisional Order to authorise the Corporation of the city and royal burgh of Aberdeen to make street improvements new tramways and an extension of their electricity works railway and to confer further powers of making town planning schemes for the city of licensing omnibuses and regulating street traffic and of borrowing money and to make further provision with respect to the local government health and finance of the city and for other purposes.	
East Lothian Western District Water Order Confirmation Act 1930	20 & 21 Geo. 5. c. cxxxiii	1 August 1930
An Act to confirm a Provisional Order under the Private Legislation Procedure (Scotland) Act 1899 relating to East Lothian Western District Water.
	East Lothian Western District Water Order 1930 Provisional Order to authorise the East Lothian Western District Water Board to borrow further moneys and for other purposes.	
Churches and Universities (Scotland) Widows' and Orphans' Fund Order Confirmation Act 1930 (repealed)	20 & 21 Geo. 5. c. cxxxiv	1 August 1930
An Act to confirm a Provisional Order under the Private Legislation Procedure (Scotland) Act 1899 relating to Churches and Universities (Scotland) Widows' and Orphans' Fund. (Repealed by Statute Law (Repeals) Act 1986 (c. 12))
	Churches and Universities (Scotland) Widows' and Orphans' Fund Order 1930 Provisional Order to provide for the amalgamation of the Church of Scotland Ministers' and Scottish University Professors Widows' Fund and the Free Churches (Scotland) Widows' and Orphans' Fund to incorporate the Trustees of the Churches and Universities (Scotland) Widows' and Orphans' Fund to confer powers on the Trustees hereby incorporated and to confer powers on the Church of Scotland General Trustees in regard to vacant stipend.	
Provisional Order (Marriages) Confirmation Act 1930 (repealed)	20 & 21 Geo. 5. c. cxxxv	1 August 1930
An Act to confirm a Provisional Order made by one of His Majesty's Principal Secretaries of State under the Marriages Validity (Provisional Orders) Acts 1905 (Note: Provisional Order (Marriages) Act 1905 (5 Edw. 7. c. 23)) and 1924. (Note: Marriages Validity (Provisional Orders) Act 1924 (14 & 15 Geo. 5. c. 20)) (Repealed by Statute Law (Repeals) Act 1977 (c. 18))
	Broadclose Congregational Church Cheriton Fitzpaine, Quinta Congregational Church Quinta Weston, Rhyn Baptist Chapel Tiverton, and Congregational Chapel Station Road Mayfield Order.	
Salford Provisional Order Confirmation Act 1930	20 & 21 Geo. 5. c. cxxxvi	1 August 1930
An Act to confirm a Provisional Order made by one of His Majesty's Principal Secretaries of State under the Public Health Act 1875 (Note: Public Health Act 1875 (38 & 39 Vict. c. 55)) relating to Salford.
	Salford Order 1930 Provisional Order made by the Secretary of State under the Salford Corporation Act 1920. (Note: Salford Corporation Act 1920 (10 & 11 Geo. 5. c. cxlviii))	
St. Helens Corporation (Trolley Vehicles) Order Confirmation Act 1930 (repealed)	20 & 21 Geo. 5. c. cxxxvii	1 August 1930
An Act to confirm a Provisional Order made by the Minister of Transport under the St. Helens Corporation Act 1921 (Note: St. Helens Corporation Act 1921 (11 & 12 Geo. 5. c. lxxiii)) relating to St. Helens Corporation trolley vehicles. (Repealed by County of Lancashire Act 1984 (c. xxi))
	St. Helens Corporation (Trolley Vehicles) Order 1930 Order authorising the mayor aldermen and burgesses of the borough of St. Helens to provide maintain and use trolley vehicles upon a route in the urban district of Haydock.	
Wolverhampton Corporation (Trolley Vehicles) Order Confirmation Act 1930 (repealed)	20 & 21 Geo. 5. c. cxxxviii	1 August 1930
An Act to confirm a Provisional Order made by the Minister of Transport under the Wolverhampton Corporation Act 1925 (Note: Wolverhampton Corporation Act 1925 (15 & 16 Geo. 5. c. cxxiii)) relating to Wolverhampton Corporation trolley vehicles. (Repealed by Wolverhampton Corporation Act 1969 (c. lx))
	Wolverhampton Corporation (Trolley Vehicles) Order 1930 Order authorising the mayor aldermen and burgesses of the borough of Wolverhampton to provide maintain and use trolley vehicles upon certain routes in the borough of Wolverhampton and the urban districts of Tettenhall and Wednesfield.	
Bradford Corporation (Trolley Vehicles) Order Confirmation Act 1930 (repealed)	20 & 21 Geo. 5. c. cxxxix	1 August 1930
An Act to confirm a Provisional Order made by the Minister of Transport under the Bradford Corporation Act 1910 (Note: Bradford Corporation Act 1910 (10 Edw. 7 & 1 Geo. 5. c. cxvii)) relating to Bradford Corporation Trolley Vehicles. (Repealed by West Yorkshire Act 1980 (c. xiv))
	Bradford Corporation (Trolley Vehicles) Order 1930 Order authorising the lord mayor aldermen and citizens of the city of Bradford to provide maintain and use trolley vehicles upon additional routes in and beyond the said city.	
Land Drainage (Ouse) Provisional Order Confirmation Act 1930	20 & 21 Geo. 5. c. cxl	1 August 1930
An Act to confirm a Provisional Order under the Land Drainage Acts 1861 (Note: Land Drainage Act 1861 (24 & 25 Vict. c. 133)) and 1918 (Note: Land Drainage Act 1918 (8 & 9 Geo. 5. c. 17)) amending the Land Drainage (Ouse) Provisional Order Confirmation Act 1920. (Note: Land Drainage (Ouse) Provisional Order Confirmation Act 1920 (10 & 11 Geo. 5. c. cxxii))
	Ouse Provisional Order 1930 Land Drainage (Ouse) Provisional Order.	
Pier and Harbour Order Confirmation (No. 1) Act 1930 (repealed)	20 & 21 Geo. 5. c. cxli	1 August 1930
An Act to confirm a Provisional Order made by the Minister of Transport under the General Pier and Harbour Act 1861 (Note: General Pier and Harbour Act 1861 (24 & 25 Vict. c. 45)) relating to Whitehaven. (Repealed by Whitehaven Harbour Act 1962 (10 & 11 Eliz. 2. c. ix))
	Whitehaven Harbour Order 1930 Provisional Order to extend the duration of the Whitehaven Harbour Order 1924.	
Pier and Harbour Orders Confirmation (No. 2) Act 1930	20 & 21 Geo. 5. c. cxlii	1 August 1930
An Act to confirm certain Provisional Orders made by the Minister of Transport under the General Pier and Harbour Act 1861 relating to King's Lynn Portsmouth and Weymouth and Melcombe Regis.
	Kings Lynn Docks and Railway (Quay) Order 1930 Provisional Order for authorising the construction of a quay by the King's Lynn Docks and Railway Company and the levy of rates and charges in connection therewith and for other purposes.	
	Portsmouth (Victoria) Pier Order 1930 Provisional Order empowering the Corporation of Portsmouth to construct a pier and other works in Portsmouth Harbour to levy rates and dues in respect thereof and for other purposes.	
	Weymouth and Melcombe Regis Harbour Order 1930 Provisional Order for authorising sanctioning and confirming the construction by the mayor aldermen and burgesses of the borough of Weymouth and Melcombe Regis of extensions of their existing quays and for other purposes.	
Ministry of Health Provisional Orders Confirmation (Goole and Oldham) Act 1930	20 & 21 Geo. 5. c. cxliii	1 August 1930
An Act to confirm certain Provisional Orders of the Minister of Health relating to Goole and Oldham.
	Goole Order 1930 Provisional order altering local Acts and a provisional order.	
	Oldham (Water Charges) Order 1930 Provisional Order amending the Oldham Improvement Act 1880. (Note: Oldham Improvement Act 1880 (43 & 44 Vict. c. cxlvii))	
Ministry of Health Provisional Order Confirmation (South Molton Rural) Act 1930	20 & 21 Geo. 5. c. cxliv	1 August 1930
An Act to confirm a Provisional Order of the Minister of Health relating to South Molton Rural District.
	South Molton Order 1930 Provisional Order dissolving the Chulmleigh Special Drainage District.	
Ministry of Health Provisional Orders Confirmation (Doncaster Saint Ives (Cornwall) and Scarborough) Act 1930	20 & 21 Geo. 5. c. cxlv	1 August 1930
An Act to confirm certain Provisional Orders of the Minister of Health relating to Doncaster Saint Ives (Cornwall) and Scarborough.
	Doncaster Order 1930 Provisiona! Order to enable the Doncaster Corporation to put in force the compulsory clauses of the Lands Clauses Acts.	
	Saint Ives (Cornwall) Order 1930 Provisional Order to enable the Saint Ives (Cornwall) Corporation to put in force the compulsory clauses of the Lands Clauses Acts.	
	Scarborough (Acquisition of Lands) Order 1930 Provisional Order to enable the Scarborough Corporation to put in force the compulsory clauses of the Lands Clauses Acts.	
Ministry of Health Provisional Order Confirmation (Brighton) Act 1930	20 & 21 Geo. 5. c. cxlvi	1 August 1930
An Act to confirm a Provisional Order of the Minister of Health relating to Brighton.
	Brighton Order 1930 Provisional Order altering certain local Acts.	
Ministry of Health Provisional Orders Confirmation (Accrington, Bognor Regis and Newton Abbot) Act 1930	20 & 21 Geo. 5. c. cxlvii	1 August 1930
An Act to confirm certain Provisional Orders of the Minister of Health relating to Accrington Bognor Regis and Newton Abbot.
	Accrington Order 1930 Provisional Order altering the Accrington Corporation Act 1905. (Note: Accrington Corporation Act 1905 (5 Edw. 7. c. xliii))	
	Bognor Regis Water Order 1930 Provisional Order altering certain local Acts.	
	Newton Abbot Order 1930 Provisional Order partially repealing and amending a local Act (Note: Newton Market Act 1868 (31 & 32 Vict. c. lxxv)) and provisional orders.	
Ministry of Health Provisional Orders Confirmation (Great Torrington, Minehead and Taf Fechan Water Supply Board) Act 1930	20 & 21 Geo. 5. c. cxlviii	1 August 1930
An Act to confirm certain Provisional Orders of the Minister of Health relating to Great Torrington Minehead and the Taf Fechan Water Supply Board.
	Great Torrington Order 1930 Provisional Order partially repealing and altering a local Act. (Note: Great Torrington Market Act 1842 (5 & 6 Vict. c. xxii))	
	Minehead Order 1930 Provisional Order amending a local Act. (Note: Minehead Urban District Council Act 1904 (4 Edw. 7. c. lxxxviii))	
	Taf Fechan Water Order 1930 Provisional Order amending the Taf Fechan Water Order 1928.	
Ministry of Health Provisional Order Confirmation (Folkestone Water) Act 1930	20 & 21 Geo. 5. c. cxlix	1 August 1930
An Act to confirm a Provisional Order of the Minister of Health relating to Folkestone Water.
	Folkestone Water Order 1930 Provisional Order under the Gas and Water Works Facilities Act 1870 and the Gas and Water Works Facilities Act 1870 Amendment Act 1873 increasing the borrowing powers of the Folkestone Waterworks Company conferring further powers upon that Company and for other purposes.	
Ministry of Health Provisional Order Confirmation (Uxbridge Joint Hospital District) Act 1930	20 & 21 Geo. 5. c. cl	1 August 1930
An Act to confirm a Provisional Order of the Minister of Health relating to Uxbridge Joint Hospital District.
	Uxbridge Joint Hospital Order 1930 Provisional Order altering Confirmation Acts.	
Ministry of Health Provisional Order Confirmation (Essex) Act 1930	20 & 21 Geo. 5. c. cli	1 August 1930
An Act to confirm a Provisional Order of the Minister of Health relating to Essex.
	County of Essex Order 1930 Provisional Order to enable the County Council of Essex to put in force the compulsory clauses of the Lands Clauses Acts.	
Ministry of Health Provisional Orders Confirmation (Torquay and Weymouth and Melcombe Regis) Act 1930	20 & 21 Geo. 5. c. clii	1 August 1930
An Act to confirm certain Provisional Orders of the Minister of Health relating to Torquay and Weymouth and Melcombe Regis.
	Torquay Order 1930 Provisional Order amending the Torquay Order 1910.	
	Weymouth and Melcombe Regis Order 1930 Provisional Order altering the Weymouth and Melcombe Regis Corporation Act 1914. (Note: Weymouth and Melcombe Regis Corporation Act 1914 (4 & 5 Geo. 5. c. clxxiv))	
Ministry of Health Provisional Order Confirmation (Morecambe and Heysham) Act 1930 (repealed)	20 & 21 Geo. 5. c. cliii	1 August 1930
An Act to confirm a Provisional Order of the Minister of Health relating to Morecambe and Heysham. (Repealed by County of Lancashire Act 1984 (c. xxi))
	Morecambe and Heysham Order 1930 Provisional Order amending the Morecambe Corporation Act 1924. (Note: Morecambe Corporation Act 1924 (14 & 15 Geo. 5. c. lv))	
Ministry of Health Provisional Order Confirmation (East Dean and United Districts Joint Hospital District) Act 1930	20 & 21 Geo. 5. c. cliv	1 August 1930
An Act to confirm a Provisional Order of the Minister of Health relating to the East Dean and United Districts Joint Hospital District.
	East Dean and United Districts Joint Hospital Order 1930 Provisional Order amending the East Dean and United Districts Joint Hospital Orders 1911 and 1918.	
Ministry of Health Provisional Orders Confirmation (Macclesfield and Willesden) Act 1930	20 & 21 Geo. 5. c. clv	1 August 1930
An Act to confirm certain Provisional Orders of the Minister of Health relating to Macclesfield and Willesden.
	Macclesfield Order 1930 Provisional Order to enable the Macclesfield Corporation to put in force the compulsory clauses of the Lands Clauses Acts.	
	Willesden Order 1930 Provisional Order to enable the Urban District Council of Willesden to put in force the compulsory clauses of the Lands Clauses Acts.	
Ministry of Health Provisional Orders Confirmation (Cardiff, Stoke-on-Trent and Worthing) Act 1930	20 & 21 Geo. 5. c. clvi	1 August 1930
An Act to confirm certain Provisional Orders of the Minister of Health relating to Cardiff Stoke-on-Trent and Worthing.
	Cardiff Order 1930 Provisional Order to enable the Cardiff Corporation to put into force the compulsory clauses of the Lands Clauses Acts.	
	Stoke-on-Trent Order 1930 Provisional Order to enable the Stoke-on-Trent Corporation to put in force the compulsory clauses of the Lands Clauses Acts.	
	Worthing Order 1930 Provisional Order to enable the Worthing Corporation to put in force the compulsory clauses of the Lands Clauses Acts.	
Shoreham Harbour Act 1930	20 & 21 Geo. 5. c. clvii	1 August 1930
An Act to authorise the Shoreham Harbour Trustees to construct works to increase their borrowing powers and for other purposes.
London Building Act 1930	20 & 21 Geo. 5. c. clviii	1 August 1930
An Act to consolidate the enactments relating to streets and buildings in London.
London County Council (General Powers) Act 1930	20 & 21 Geo. 5. c. clix	1 August 1930
An Act to confer further powers upon the London County Council and upon the corporation of the city of London and metropolitan borough councils to amend the Acts relating to the establishment of superannuation funds by the councils of certain metropolitan boroughs and for other purposes.
Southampton County Council (Bursledon Bridge) Act 1930	20 & 21 Geo. 5. c. clx	1 August 1930
An Act to provide for the transfer to the county council of the administrative county of Southampton of the undertaking of the Company of Proprietors of Bursledon Bridge and Roads and for other purposes.
London and North Eastern Railway (General Powers) Act 1930	20 & 21 Geo. 5. c. clxi	1 August 1930
An Act to confer further powers upon the London and North Eastern Railway Company to revive the powers and extend the time for the compulsory purchase of certain lands to abandon certain works to make provision with reference to the rates and charges which may be levied at certain harbours docks and piers of the Company and for other purposes.
Manchester Corporation (Improvements) Act 1930	20 & 21 Geo. 5. c. clxii	1 August 1930
An Act to empower the lord mayor aldermen and citizens of the city of Manchester to construct street improvements and for other purposes.
South Yorkshire and Derbyshire Gas Act 1930	20 & 21 Geo. 5. c. clxiii	1 August 1930
An Act to provide for amalgamation of the undertakings of the Dinnington and District Gas Company Limited the Staveley Gas Light and Coke Company Limited the Whitwell and District Gas Company the Bawtry and District Gas Company the Beighton and District Gas Company Limited and the Maltby and Bramley Gas Company Limited to incorporate and confer powers on the South Yorkshire and Derbyshire Gas Company and vest in that Company the amalgamated undertakings and for other purposes.
Ascot District Gas and Electricity Act 1930	20 & 21 Geo. 5. c. clxiv	1 August 1930
An Act to authorise the Ascot District Gas and Electricity Company to raise additional capital and for other purposes.
Brixham Gas and Electricity Act 1930	20 & 21 Geo. 5. c. clxv	1 August 1930
An Act to consolidate and convert the capital of the Brixham Gas Company to authorise the Company to raise additional capital to change the name of the Company and for other purposes.
Middlesex County Council Act 1930 (repealed)	20 & 21 Geo. 5. c. clxvi	1 August 1930
An Act to confer further powers upon the Middlesex County Council in reference to the completion of the North Circular Road the acquisition of the Duke of Northumberland's River and other matters to enlarge the powers of the local authorities in the county and to make further provision for the health local government and improvement of the said county and for other purposes. (Repealed by Middlesex County Council Act 1944 (7 & 8 Geo. 6. c. xxi))
London, Midland and Scottish Railway (No. 2) Act 1930	20 & 21 Geo. 5. c. clxvii	1 August 1930
An Act to make provision in relation to rates dues and charges at the harbours docks and piers of the London Midland and Scottish Railway Company and for other purposes.
Southern Railway Act 1930	20 & 21 Geo. 5. c. clxviii	1 August 1930
An Act to empower the Southern Railway Company to construct works and acquire lands to extend the time for the completion of certain works and the compulsory purchase of certain lands to make provision with reference to the rates and charges which may be levied at certain harbours of the Company and for other purposes.
Stockport Corporation Act 1930	20 & 21 Geo. 5. c. clxix	1 August 1930
An Act to empower the mayor aldermen and burgesses of the county borough of Stockport to construct new reservoirs and other works in connection with their water undertaking to construct a new road in the said borough to acquire lands and for other purposes.
Walsall Corporation Act 1930	20 & 21 Geo. 5. c. clxx	1 August 1930
An Act to extend the boundaries of the borough of Walsall to empower the mayor aldermen and burgesses of the borough to purchase and discontinue certain tramways in the borough of Wednesbury and the urban district of Darlaston connected with the tramways of the Walsall Corporation and to run omnibuses in substitution for the tramway services to make other provision with regard to the omnibus undertaking of the Corporation to authorise the purchase of lands for various purposes to make further provision with regard to the health local government and improvement of the borough and for other purposes.
Falmouth Corporation (Water) Act 1930	20 & 21 Geo. 5. c. clxxi	1 August 1930
An Act to provide for the transfer of the undertaking and powers of the Falmouth Waterworks Company to the mayor aldermen and burgesses of the borough of Falmouth to authorise the said mayor aldermen and burgesses to supply water in and in the neighbourhood of their borough and for other purposes.
Stockton-on-Tees Corporation (General Powers) Act 1930 (repealed)	20 & 21 Geo. 5. c. clxxii	1 August 1930
An Act to empower the mayor aldermen and burgesses of the borough of Stockton-on-Tees to discontinue tramways and to authorise the mayor aldermen and burgesses of the borough of Middlesbrough also to discontinue tramways and to enable the two Corporations to run omnibuses between Norton in the borough of Stockton-on-Tees and North Ormesby Road in the borough of Middlesbrough to confer further powers on the Stockton-on-Tees Corporation with regard to streets and buildings and the health and good government of their borough and for other purposes. (Repealed by County of Cleveland Act 1987 (c. ix))
Manchester Extension Act 1930	20 & 21 Geo. 5. c. clxxiii	1 August 1930
An Act to extend the boundaries of the city of Manchester and for purposes incidental thereto.
Cardiff Corporation Act 1930	20 & 21 Geo. 5. c. clxxiv	1 August 1930
An Act to empower the lord mayor aldermen and citizens of the city of Cardiff to construct waterworks and execute street improvements and to acquire lands for those and other purposes to confer upon them further powers with reference to their water tramway and omnibus undertakings to make further provision for the improvement health and good government of the city and for other purposes.
Kingston-upon-Hull Corporation Act 1930	20 & 21 Geo. 5. c. clxxv	1 August 1930
An Act to authorise the lord mayor aldermen and citizens of the city and county of Kingston upon Hull to construct street improvements and waterworks and to make further provision for the health local government and improvement of the city and for other purposes.
Rotherham Corporation Act 1930	20 & 21 Geo. 5. c. clxxvi	1 August 1930
An Act to empower the mayor aldermen and burgesses of the county borough of Rotherham to construct street improvements to confer further powers upon them with regard to their tramway trolley vehicle omnibus electricity and water undertakings to make further provision with regard to the health local government and improvement of the borough and for other purposes.
Glasgow Corporation Act 1930	20 & 21 Geo. 5. c. clxxvii	1 August 1930
An Act to confer on the corporation of the city of Glasgow further powers in connection with their tramway and other undertakings to extend the boundaries of the city to authorise the Corporation to borrow money and for other purposes.
Manchester Corporation (General Powers) Act 1930	20 & 21 Geo. 5. c. clxxviii	1 August 1930
An Act to make further provision with respect to the terms for the supply of water in bulk by the lord mayor aldermen and citizens of the city of Manchester to empower them to acquire by agreement the water undertaking of the Salford Corporation and to make further provision in reference to their water electricity and tramway undertakings the granting of superannuation allowances and the health local government and improvement of the city and for other purposes.
Bristol Cattle Market Act 1930	20 & 21 Geo. 5. c. clxxix	1 August 1930
An Act to authorise the sale to the Postmaster-General of part of the site of the Bristol Cattle Market to provide for the vesting in the lord mayor aldermen and burgesses of the city of Bristol of the remainder of the said site and the Wool Hall in the said city and for other purposes.
Bristol Corporation (No. 2) Act 1930	20 & 21 Geo. 5. c. clxxx	1 August 1930
An Act to extend the boundaries of the city of Bristol to alter the limits of the port and harbour of Bristol to make further provision for the improvement health and good government of the city and for other purposes.
Bournemouth Corporation Act 1930 (repealed)	20 & 21 Geo. 5. c. clxxxi	1 August 1930
An Act to extend the boundaries of the borough of Bournemouth to empower the mayor aldermen and burgesses of the borough to provide a separate police force to run trolley vehicles and omnibuses within and beyond the borough and to abandon and discontinue the tramways of the Corporation to make further provision with regard to the health local government and improvement of the borough and for other purposes. (Repealed by Bournemouth Borough Council Act 1985 (c. v))
Dartford Tunnel Act 1930 (repealed)	20 & 21 Geo. 5. c. clxxxii	1 August 1930
An Act to authorise the construction of a tunnel under the river Thames between Dartford in the county of Kent and Purfleet in the county of Essex and approaches to such tunnel and for other purposes. (Repealed by Dartford Tunnel Act 1967 (c. xxxvii))
Southend-on-Sea Corporation Act 1930	20 & 21 Geo. 5. c. clxxxiii	1 August 1930
An Act to empower the mayor aldermen and burgesses of the borough of Southend-on-Sea to execute street works to confer further powers upon them with regard to the provision and working of trolley vehicles and omnibuses and for other purposes.
Leicester Corporation Act 1930	20 & 21 Geo. 5. c. clxxxiv	1 August 1930
An Act to empower the lord mayor aldermen and citizens of the city of Leicester to provide and work trolley vehicles to confer upon them further powers with reference to their omnibus and tramway undertakings to extend the limits for the supply of water by the Corporation and to confer upon them further powers with reference to their water undertaking to extend the time for the compulsory purchase of lands for certain purposes to make further provisions with reference to the finance of the city and for other purposes.
Boston Corporation Act 1930	20 & 21 Geo. 5. c. clxxxv	1 August 1930
An Act to transfer to and vest in the mayor aldermen and burgesses of the borough of Boston the undertaking of the Boston Waterworks Company to authorise the said mayor aldermen and burgesses to supply water in and in the neighbourhood of the borough to make further provisions with respect to the finance of the borough and for other purposes.
Bootle Corporation Act 1930 (repealed)	20 & 21 Geo. 5. c. clxxxvi	1 August 1930
An Act to make further provision for the health local government and improvement of the borough of Bootle to authorise the mayor aldermen and burgesses of the borough to borrow money by means of bonds and for other purposes. (Repealed by County of Merseyside Act 1980 (c. x))
London United Tramways Act 1930	20 & 21 Geo. 5. c. clxxxvii	1 August 1930
An Act to authorise the London United Tramways Limited to provide services of trolley vehicles and to abandon their tramways and light railways to confer upon them additional powers and for other purposes.
Southport Corporation Act 1930	20 & 21 Geo. 5. c. clxxxviii	1 August 1930
An Act to make further provision in regard to the tramway gas electricity and markets undertakings of the mayor aldermen and burgesses of the borough of Southport and for the health local government and improvement of the borough and for other purposes.
Shropshire, Worcestershire and Staffordshire Electric Power Act 1930 (repealed)	20 & 21 Geo. 5. c. clxxxix	1 August 1930
An Act to confer further powers upon the Shropshire Worcestershire and Staffordshire Electric Power Company and for other purposes. (Repealed by Shropshire, Worcestershire and Staffordshire Electric Power (Consolidation) Act 1938 (1 & 2 Geo. 6. c. lviii))
Redcross Street Burial Ground (Bristol) Act 1930	20 & 21 Geo. 5. c. cxc	1 August 1930
An Act to authorise the removal of the restrictions attaching to the Redcross Street Burial Ground in the city of Bristol so as to authorise its use for building or otherwise and for other purposes.
Hartlepool Gas and Water Act 1930	20 & 21 Geo. 5. c. cxci	1 August 1930
An Act to authorise the Hartlepool Gas and Water Company to construct waterworks to confer further powers upon that Company and for other purposes.
River Lee (Flood Relief, &c.) Act 1930 or the River Lee (Flood Relief) Act 1930	20 & 21 Geo. 5. c. cxcii	1 August 1930
An Act to authorise the Lee Conservancy Board and the mayor aldermen and burgesses of the county borough of West Ham to execute works for the improvement of the river Lee and other rivers in and adjoining that borough to provide for the making of contributions thereto by other authorities to confer further powers with reference to the said river and its tributaries and for other purposes.
Newcastle-upon-Tyne Corporation (Quay Extension, &c.) Act 1930	20 & 21 Geo. 5. c. cxciii	1 August 1930
An Act to empower the lord mayor aldermen and citizens of the city and county of Newcastle-upon-Tyne to construct a new quay and other works to confer further borrowing powers upon the Corporation and for other purposes.
West Ham Corporation Act 1930	20 & 21 Geo. 5. c. cxciv	1 August 1930
An Act to authorise the mayor aldermen and burgesses of the county borough of West Ham to execute street works and to acquire lands and for other purposes.

=== Private acts ===
Short title	Citation	Royal assent
Long title
Argyll Trust Estate Act 1930	20 & 21 Geo. 5. c. 1 Pr.	1 August 1930
An Act to vary the powers of the Trustees under the trust disposition and settlement and codicils of the Most Noble John Douglas Sutherland Campbell Ninth Duke of Argyll Knight of the Most Ancient and Most Noble Order of the Thistle by giving authority to the said Trustees to sell the trust estate or any part thereof and to provide for the application of the proceeds of such sale and for other purposes.

== 21 & 22 Geo. 5 ==
The second session of the 35th Parliament of the United Kingdom, which met from 28 October 1930 until 7 October 1931.

This session was also traditionally cited as 21 & 22 G. 5.

=== Public general acts ===
Short title	Citation	Royal assent
Long title
Consolidated Fund (No. 1) Act 1930 (Session 2) (repealed)	21 & 22 Geo. 5. c. 1	19 December 1930
An Act to apply a sum out of the Consolidated Fund to the service of the year ending on the thirty-first day of March, one thousand nine hundred and thirty-one. (Repealed by Statute Law Revision Act 1950 (14 Geo. 6. c. 6))
Cunard (Insurance) Agreement Act 1930 (repealed)	21 & 22 Geo. 5. c. 2	19 December 1930
An Act to authorise the making of an agreement between the Cunard Steam Ship Company Limited and the Board of Trade for the insurance of two passenger vessels and the making of agreements between the said Company and the Board of Trade supplementing or modifying that agreement, and for purposes incidental to and connected with the agreements so authorised to be made. (Repealed by Statute Law Revision Act 1959 (7 & 8 Eliz. 2. c. 68))
Unemployment Insurance (No. 4) Act 1930 (repealed)	21 & 22 Geo. 5. c. 3	19 December 1930
An Act to raise to seventy million pounds the limit on the amount of the advances by the Treasury to the Unemployment Fund which may be outstanding during the deficiency period. (Repealed by Unemployment Insurance Act 1931 (21 & 22 Geo. 5. c. 8))
Expiring Laws Continuance Act 1930 (repealed)	21 & 22 Geo. 5. c. 4	19 December 1930
An Act to continue certain expiring laws. (Repealed by Statute Law Revision Act 1950 (14 Geo. 6. c. 6))
National Health Insurance (Prolongation of Insurance) Act 1930 (repealed)	21 & 22 Geo. 5. c. 5	19 December 1930
An Act to amend subsection (3) of section three of the National Health Insurance Act, 1924, (Note: National Health Insurance Act 1924 (14 & 15 Geo. 5. c. 38)) and to make financial provision in connection with such amendment. (Repealed by National Health Insurance Act 1936 (26 Geo. 5 & 1 Edw. 8. c. 32))

=== Local acts ===
Short title	Citation	Royal assent
Long title
Public Works Facilities Scheme (Thorne and District Water) Confirmation Act 1930	21 & 22 Geo. 5. c. i	19 December 1930
An Act to confirm a Scheme made by the Minister of Health under the Public Works Facilities Act 1930 (Note: Public Works Facilities Act 1930 (20 & 21 Geo. 5. c. 50)) and relating to the Thorne and District Water Company.
	Thorne and District Water Scheme 1930 Scheme under the Public Works Facilities Act 1930 empowering the Thorne and District Water Company to construct waterworks and for other purposes.	
Fraserburgh Harbour Order Confirmation Act 1930 (repealed)	21 & 22 Geo. 5. c. ii	19 December 1930
An Act to confirm a Provisional Order under the Private Legislation Procedure (Scotland) Act 1899 (Note: Private Legislation Procedure (Scotland) Act 1899 (62 & 63 Vict. c. 47)) relating to Fraserburgh Harbour. (Repealed by Fraserburgh Harbour Order Confirmation Act 1985 (c. xlv))
	Fraserburgh Harbour Order 1930 Provisional Order to amend the Fraserburgh Harbour Act 1878 (Note: Fraserburgh Harbour Act 1878 (41 & 42 Vict. c. cii)) with respect to the qualification of electors and persons to be elected Commissioners of the harbour of Fraserburgh and the quorums of committees of the Commissioners to revive the powers for the construction of and extend the time for the completion of works authorised in 1919 to authorise the Commissioners to levy increased rates and for other purposes.	
Grampian Electricity Supply Order Confirmation Act 1930 (repealed)	21 & 22 Geo. 5. c. iii	19 December 1930
An Act to confirm a Provisional Order under the Private Legislation Procedure (Scotland) Act 1899 relating to Grampian Electricity Supply. (Repealed by North of Scotland Electricity Order Confirmation Act 1958 (7 & 8 Eliz. 2. c. ii))
	Grampian Electricity Supply Order 1930 Provisional Order to extend the periods for the compulsory purchase of lands and for the completion of the works authorised by the Grampian Electricity Supply Act 1922 (Note: Grampian Electricity Supply Act 1922 (12 & 13 Geo. 5. c. lxxix)) and for other purposes.	
London and North Eastern Railway Order Confirmation Act 1930	21 & 22 Geo. 5. c. iv	19 December 1930
An Act to confirm a Provisional Order under the Private Legislation Procedure (Scotland) Act 1899 relating to London and North Eastern Railway.
	London and North Eastern Railway Order 1930 Provisional Order to empower the London and North Eastern Railway Company to construct widenings of railway and to acquire lands to authorise the abandonment of a portion of the Union Canal and for other purposes.	
Dumfries Waterworks Order Confirmation Act 1930	21 & 22 Geo. 5. c. v	19 December 1930
An Act to confirm a Provisional Order under the Private Legislation Procedure (Scotland) Act 1899 relating to Dumfries Waterworks.
	Dumfries Waterworks Order 1930 Provisional Order to authorise the provost magistrates and councillors of the burgh of Dumfries to construct additional waterworks to confer further powers upon them with regard to their water undertaking to authorise them to borrow further moneys and for other purposes.	
London County Council Improvements Act 1930 (repealed)	21 & 22 Geo. 5. c. vi	19 December 1930
An Act to empower the London County Council to make a new streetstreet improvements and other works in the vicinity of the Elephant and Castle and to construct and work new tramways in connection therewith and for other purposes. (Repealed by Local Law (Greater London Council and Inner London Boroughs) Order 1965 (SI 1965/540))

== See also ==
- List of acts of the Parliament of the United Kingdom
