= Unemployment Insurance Act 1935 =

Act of the Parliament of the United Kingdom

Unemployment Insurance Act 1935 (Note: Section 116(1).)
- Act of Parliament
- Parliament of the United Kingdom
- Long title: An Act to consolidate the Unemployment Insurance Acts, 1920 to 1934, and certain other enactments relating to those Acts.
- Citation: 25 & 26 Geo. 5. c. 8
- Territorial extent: Great Britain (Note: Section 115(2).)

Dates
- Royal assent: 26 February 1935
- Commencement: 18 March 1935 (Note: Section 116(3).)
- Repealed: 31 July 1978
Other legislation
Amends	See § Repealed enactments
Repeals/revokes	See § Repealed enactments
Amended by	Unemployment Insurance Act 1940; National Insurance Act 1946; Education (Scotland) Act 1946; Companies Act 1948; Statute Law Revision Act 1963
Repealed by	Statute Law (Repeals) Act 1978

Status: Repealed

Text of statute as originally enacted

The Unemployment Insurance Act 1935 (25 & 26 Geo. 5. c. 8) was an act of the Parliament of the United Kingdom that consolidated enactments relating to unemployment insurance in Great Britain.

== Provisions ==
=== Repealed enactments ===
Section 116(2) of the act repealed 14 enactments and 5 orders, listed in part I and II of the seventh schedule to the act, respectively.

Part I - statutes
Citation	Short title	Extent of repeal
10 & 11 Geo. 5. c. 30	Unemployment Insurance Act 1920	The whole act.
11 & 12 Geo. 5. c. 1	Unemployment Insurance Act 1921	The whole act.
11 & 12 Geo. 5. c. 15	Unemployment Insurance (No. 2) Act 1921	The whole act.
11 & 12 Geo. 5. c. 51	Education Act 1921	Section one hundred and seven.
12 & 13 Geo. 5. c. 7	Unemployment Insurance Act 1922	The whole act.
13 & 14 Geo. 5. c. 2	Unemployment Insurance Act 1923	The whole act.
14 & 15 Geo. 5. c. 30	Unemployment Insurance (No. 2) Act 1924	The whole act.
15 & 16 Geo. 5. c. 69	Unemployment Insurance Act 1925	The whole act.
15 & 16 Geo. 5. c. 70	Widows', Orphans' and Old Age Contributory Pensions Act 1925	In subsection (1) of section ten, the words from "and the provisions of section thirty-one" to the end of the subsection; in subsection (7) of section fifteen, the words "or of the Unemployment Insurance Acts, 1920 to 1924"; in subsection (1) of section thirty-seven, the words "and to unemployment benefit under the Unemployment Insurance Acts, 1920 to 1924"; section thirty-nine; in subsection (1) of section forty-four, the words "except where the expression is used in relation to contributions under the Unemployment Insurance Acts, 1920 to 1924," and in subsection (8) of that section, the words from "and so far as" to the end of the subsection.
17 & 18 Geo. 5. c. 30	Unemployment Insurance Act 1927	The whole act.
20 & 21 Geo. 5. c. 3	Unemployment Insurance Act 1929	The whole act.
20 & 21 Geo. 5. c. 16	Unemployment Insurance Act 1930	The whole act.
21 & 22 Geo. 5. c. 36	Unemployment Insurance (No. 3) Act 1931	The whole act.
24 & 25 Geo. 5. c. 29	Unemployment Act 1934	Part I; section fifty-eight; and the First, Second, Third, Fourth and Fifth Schedules.

Part II - Orders
Citation	Short title	Extent of repeal
SR&O 1922/185	Government of Ireland (Adaptation of Unemployment Insurance Acts) Order 1922	Article three, paragraphs(2), (3) and (4) of Article four, and Article eight.
SR&O 1924/387	Irish Free State (Unemployment Insurance Arrangement) Order 1924	The whole order.
SR&O 1927/677	Ministry of Labour (Transfer of Powers) Order 1927	The whole order.
SR&O 1931/814	Unemployment Insurance (National Economy) (No. 1) Order 1931	The whole order.
SR&O 1934/1324	Unemployment Insurance (Removal of Difficulties) Order 1934	The whole order.

== Subsequent developments ==
The main operative provisions of the act were repealed by section 65(1) of, and the ninth schedule to, the National Insurance Act 1946 (9 & 10 Geo. 6. c. 67), which came into force on 5 July 1948. The repealed provisions included sections 1 to 60, section 62, sections 65 to 71, parts of section 72, sections 73 to 75, sections 84 and 85, parts of section 86, section 88, sections 92 to 95, parts of section 96, sections 97 to 99, parts of section 104, sections 106 to 112, parts of section 113, sections 114 and 115, parts of section 116, and the whole of the schedules to the act.

The whole act was repealed by section 1(1) of, and part VII of schedule 1 to, the Statute Law (Repeals) Act 1978, which came into force on 31 July 1978.
