= Unemployment Assistance Board =

British board

The Unemployment Assistance Board was a body created in Britain by the Unemployment Act 1934 due to the high levels of inter-war poverty in Britain. The Board kept a system of means-tested benefits and increased the number of people who could claim relief.

According to Tony Lynes "The board was a constitutional innovation: a department of government with its own budget, headed not by a minister but by the six members of the board, appointed by the Minister of Labour but for whose actions he could not be held responsible".
