= Unemployment Insurance Act 1924 =

Act of the Parliament of the United Kingdom

Unemployment Insurance Act 1924 (Note: Section 2.)
- Act of Parliament
- Parliament of the United Kingdom
- Long title: An Act to repeal proviso (2) to section two of the Unemployment Insurance Act, 1923.
- Citation: 14 & 15 Geo. 5. c. 1
- Territorial extent: England and Wales; Scotland

Dates
- Royal assent: 21 February 1924
- Commencement: 21 February 1924 (Note: Section 1.)
- Repealed: 1 August 1924
Other legislation
Amends	Unemployment Insurance Act 1923
Repealed by	Unemployment Insurance (No. 2) Act 1924
Relates to	Unemployment Insurance Act 1920; Unemployment Insurance Act 1923

Status: Repealed

Text of statute as originally enacted

The Unemployment Insurance Act 1924 (14 & 15 Geo. 5. c. 1) was an act of the Parliament of the United Kingdom passed when the British Labour Party was in power in 1924. The act arose from a dispute over the means testing of benefits. The Labour Cabinet disagreed on whether means testing should be abolished or whether such a move would prove too costly. The compromise was that the test for receiving benefits would be whether a person was "genuinely seeking work". The 1924 act extended to "genuinely seeking work" test to all benefited claims.
