= Unemployment Act 1934 =

Act of the Parliament of the United Kingdom

Unemployment Act 1934 (Note: Section 64(1).)
- Act of Parliament
- Parliament of the United Kingdom
- Long title: An Act to amend the Unemployment Insurance Acts, 1920 to 1933, and to make further provision for the training and assistance of persons who are capable of, and available for, work but have no work or only part-time or intermittent work; and for purposes connected with the matters aforesaid.
- Citation: 24 & 25 Geo. 5. c. 29
- Territorial extent: England and Wales; Scotland; (Note: Section 34(2), 57(1) and 64(2).)

Dates
- Royal assent: 28 June 1934
- Commencement: various (Note: Section 64(2). The Unemployment Act 1934 (Appointed Days) Order (Northern Ireland) 1934, the Unemployment Act (Northern Ireland) 1934 (Appointed Days) Amending Order (Northern Ireland) 1935 and the Unemployment Act (Northern Ireland) 1934, (Second Appointed Day) Order (Northern Ireland) 1936.)
- Repealed: 5 July 1948 (Note: The National Assistance Act (Appointed Day) Order 1948 (SI 1948/1218) and National Assistance Act (Appointed Day) (Scotland) Order 1948 (SI 1948/1207).)
Other legislation
Amends	Unemployment Insurance Act 1920; Unemployment Insurance Act 1921; Unemployment Insurance (No. 2) Act 1921; Unemployment Insurance Act 1922; Unemployment Insurance Act 1923; Unemployment Insurance (No. 2) Act 1924; Unemployment Insurance Act 1925; Unemployment Insurance Act 1927; Unemployment Insurance Act 1930; Unemployment Insurance (No. 3) Act 1931; Unemployment Insurance (National Economy) (No. 1) Order 1931; Unemployment Insurance (National Economy) (No. 2) Order 1931
Repeals/revokes	Unemployment Insurance (Transitional Provisions Amendment) Act 1929
Amended by	Unemployment Insurance Act 1935; Widows', Orphans' and Old Age Contributory Pensions Act 1936; Unemployment Insurance Act 1940
Repealed by	National Assistance Act 1948

Status: Repealed

Text of statute as originally enacted

The Unemployment Act 1934 (24 & 25 Geo. 5. c. 29) (part 1 was also known as the Unemployment Insurance Act 1934 and part 2 as the Unemployment Assistance Act 1934), was an act of the Parliament of the United Kingdom, reaching statute on 28 June 1934. It reduced the age at which a person entered the National Insurance scheme to 14 and made the claiming age 16 years. It also separated benefits earned by paying National Insurance and those purely based on need. To do this, it established two bodies: the Unemployment Insurance Statutory Committee to deal with unemployment benefits earned by payment of National Insurance when in work; and the Unemployment Assistance Board to provide means-tested payments for those not entitled to such benefits. The Unemployment Act 1934 also restored the previous 10% cut in unemployment benefits, brought in after the 1931 May Committee. This was due to a reduction in the number of those unemployed in the UK, which was reduced partially due to the creation of the Iron and Steel Federation in 1934 and the introduction of the National Grid in 1933.

== Basis for the act ==
In order to pass the act, Sir Henry Betterton (Minister of Labour at the time), based his bill on a set of principles. Betterton divided the bill into three separate parts, each of which had a distinct set of principles.

=== Part 1: Insurance ===
1. That the scheme should be financed by contributions from the workers, employers and the State.
2. That benefit should be dependent upon contributions
3. That the scheme should be maintained on a solvent and self-supporting basis.

=== Part 2: Eligibility ===
1. That assistance should be proportionate to need.
2. That a worker who has been long unemployed may require assistance other than, and in addition to, cash payments.
3. That the State should accept general responsibility for all the industrial able-bodied unemployed outside insurance, within, of course, the limits of a practical definition.

=== Part 3: Transition ===
Part III of the act dealt with the transitory provisions—for the transition from the existing arrangements to the amended insurance scheme and the new assistance scheme.

== Subsequent developments ==
Part I and section 58 of, and the first, second, third, fourth and fifth schedules to, the act were repealed by section 116(2) of, and part I of the seventh schedule to the Unemployment Insurance Act 1935 (25 & 26 Geo. 5. c. 8), which came into force on 18 March 1935.

The whole act was repealed by section 62(3) of, and part I of the seventh schedule to, the National Assistance Act 1948 (11 & 12 Geo. 6. c. 29), which came into operation on 5 July 1948.
