= Unemployment Insurance Act 1927 =

Act of the Parliament of the United Kingdom

Unemployment Insurance Act 1927 (Note: Section 16(4).)
- Act of Parliament
- Parliament of the United Kingdom
- Long title: An Act to amend the Unemployment Insurance Acts, 1920 to 1926.
- Citation: 17 & 18 Geo. 5. c. 30
- Territorial extent: United Kingdom

Dates
- Royal assent: 22 December 1927
- Commencement: 19 April 1928 (Note: Section 16(5).)
- Repealed: 8 March 1935
Other legislation
Amends	Unemployment Insurance Act 1920; Unemployment Insurance Act 1921; Unemployment Insurance (No. 2) Act 1921; Unemployment Insurance Act 1922; Unemployment Insurance Act 1923; Unemployment Insurance (No. 2) Act 1924; Unemployment Insurance Act 1925
Repeals/revokes	Unemployment Insurance (No. 3) Act 1924
Amended by	Unemployment Insurance (Transitional Provisions Amendment) Act 1929; Unemployment Insurance Act 1930; Unemployment Act 1934
Repealed by	Unemployment Insurance Act 1935

Status: Repealed

Text of statute as originally enacted

The Unemployment Insurance Act 1927 (17 & 18 Geo. 5. c. 30) was an act of the Parliament of the United Kingdom passed by the Conservative Party in 1927. It reintroduced means testing for some benefits. One of the most controversial proposals was to raise Treasury contributions to that made by employers and workers, but that was dropped from the final legislation.

== Subsequent developments ==
The whole act was repealed by section 116(2) of, and part I of the seventh schedule to the Unemployment Insurance Act 1935 (25 & 26 Geo. 5. c. 8), which came into force on 18 March 1935.
