= Unemployment Insurance Act 1921 =

Act of the Parliament of the United Kingdom

Unemployment Insurance Act 1921 (Note: Section 9(5).)
- Act of Parliament
- Parliament of the United Kingdom
- Long title: An Act to provide for an increase of the rates and period of benefit under the Unemployment Insurance Act, 1920, and to vary the conditions for the receipt of such benefit, and to amend the said Act with respect to the rates and crediting of contributions thereunder, and otherwise.
- Citation: 11 & 12 Geo. 5. c. 1
- Territorial extent: United Kingdom

Dates
- Royal assent: 3 March 1921
- Commencement: 3 March 1921 (Note: Section 9(6).)
- Repealed: England and Wales and Scotland: 18 March 1935; Northern Ireland:
Other legislation
Amends	Unemployment Insurance Act 1920
Amended by	Unemployment Insurance (No. 2) Act 1921; Unemployment Insurance Act 1922; Unemployment Insurance Act 1927; Unemployment Act 1934
Repealed by	England and Wales and Scotland: Unemployment Insurance Act 1935; Northern Ireland: Unemployment Insurance Act (Northern Ireland) 1936

Status: Repealed

Text of statute as originally enacted

The Unemployment Insurance Act 1921 (11 & 12 Geo. 5. c. 1) was an act of the Parliament of the United Kingdom. The act stated that under-18s were to receive less unemployment benefits than adults along with women who were to receive less than men.

== Subsequent developments ==
The whole act was repealed by section 116(2) of, and part I of the seventh schedule to the Unemployment Insurance Act 1935 (25 & 26 Geo. 5. c. 8), which came into force on 18 March 1935.
