= Unemployment Insurance Act 1920 =

Act of the Parliament of the United Kingdom

Unemployment Insurance Act 1920 (Note: Section 48(1).)
- Act of Parliament
- Parliament of the United Kingdom
- Long title: An Act to amend the Law in respect of Insurance against Unemployment.
- Citation: 10 & 11 Geo. 5. c. 30
- Territorial extent: United Kingdom

Dates
- Royal assent: 9 August 1920
- Commencement: 8 November 1920 (Note: Section 48(2).)
- Repealed: England and Wales and Scotland: 18 March 1935; Northern Ireland:
Other legislation
Amends	National Insurance Act 1911
Repeals/revokes	National Insurance (Part II. Amendment) Act 1914
Amended by	{{ubliUnemployment Insurance Act 1921|Unemployment Insurance (No. 2) Act 1921|Unemployed Workers’ Dependants (Temporary Provision) Act 1921|Unemployment Insurance Act 1922|Unemployment Insurance Act 1923|Unemployment Insurance (No. 2) Act 1924|Unemployment Insurance Act 1927|Unemployment Insurance Act 1930|Unemployment Act 1934}}
Repealed by	England and Wales and Scotland: Unemployment Insurance Act 1935; Northern Ireland: Unemployment Insurance Act (Northern Ireland) 1936

Status: Repealed

Text of statute as originally enacted

The Unemployment Insurance Act 1920 (10 & 11 Geo. 5. c. 30) was an act of the Parliament of the United Kingdom. It created the dole (weekly cash unemployment benefits) system of payments to unemployed workers.

The act passed at a time of very little unemployment, when the Conservatives dominated Parliament. It set up the dole system that provided 15 weeks of unemployment benefits to cover over 11 million workers—practically the entire civilian working population except domestic service, farm workers, railway workers, and civil servants. Funded in part by weekly contributions from both employers and employed, it provided weekly payments of 15s for unemployed men and 12s for unemployed women. Historian Charles Loch Mowat calls this legislation "Socialism by the back door," and notes how surprised politicians were when the costs to the Treasury soared during the high unemployment of 1921.

== Subsequent developments ==
The whole act was repealed for England and Wales and Scotland by section 116(2) of, and part I of the seventh schedule to the Unemployment Insurance Act 1935 (25 & 26 Geo. 5. c. 8), which came into force on 18 March 1935.

== See also ==
- Unemployment Insurance Act 1921
