= Unemployment Insurance Act 1930 =

Act of the Parliament of the United Kingdom

Unemployment Insurance Act 1930 (Note: Section 20(5).)
- Act of Parliament
- Parliament of the United Kingdom
- Long title: An Act to amend the Unemployment Insurance Acts, 1920 to 1929.
- Citation: 20 & 21 Geo. 5. c. 16
- Territorial extent: United Kingdom

Dates
- Royal assent: 6 February 1930
- Commencement: 13 March 1930 (Note: Section 20(7).)
- Expired: 30 June 1933 (Note: Section 20(8).)
- Repealed: 18 March 1935
Other legislation
Amends	Unemployment Insurance Act 1920; Unemployment Insurance (No. 2) Act 1921; Unemployment Insurance Act 1922; Unemployment Insurance Act 1923; Unemployment Insurance (No. 2) Act 1924; Unemployment Insurance Act 1927
Amended by	Unemployment Act 1934
Repealed by	Unemployment Insurance Act 1935
Relates to	Unemployment Insurance Act 1920

Status: Repealed

Text of statute as originally enacted

The Unemployment Insurance Act 1930 (20 & 21 Geo. 5. c. 16) was an act of the Parliament of the United Kingdom passed in response to the economic problems emerging due to the Wall Street crash and Great Depression. It substantially reformed the benefits system and abolished the rule that those claiming benefits must genuinely be seeking work.

The changes made by the act to the Unemployment Insurance Acts 1920 to 1929 were temporary, section 20(7) and (8) providing that they only had effect from 13 March 1930 until 30 June 1933. It was continued in force until 30 June 1934 by the Unemployment Insurance (Expiring Enactments) Act 1933.

== Subsequent developments ==
The whole act was repealed by section 116(2) of, and part I of the seventh schedule to the Unemployment Insurance Act 1935 (25 & 26 Geo. 5. c. 8), which came into force on 18 March 1935.
