= List of acts of the Parliament of the United Kingdom from 1902 =

This is a complete list of acts of the Parliament of the United Kingdom for the year 1902.

Note that the first parliament of the United Kingdom was held in 1801; parliaments between 1707 and 1800 were either parliaments of Great Britain or of Ireland). For acts passed up until 1707, see the list of acts of the Parliament of England and the list of acts of the Parliament of Scotland. For acts passed from 1707 to 1800, see the list of acts of the Parliament of Great Britain. See also the list of acts of the Parliament of Ireland.

For acts of the devolved parliaments and assemblies in the United Kingdom, see the list of acts of the Scottish Parliament, the list of acts of the Northern Ireland Assembly, and the list of acts and measures of Senedd Cymru; see also the list of acts of the Parliament of Northern Ireland.

The number shown after each act's title is its chapter number. Acts passed before 1963 are cited using this number, preceded by the year(s) of the reign during which the relevant parliamentary session was held; thus the Union with Ireland Act 1800 is cited as "39 & 40 Geo. 3 c. 67", meaning the 67th act passed during the session that started in the 39th year of the reign of George III and which finished in the 40th year of that reign. Note that the modern convention is to use Arabic numerals in citations (thus "41 Geo. 3" rather than "41 Geo. III"). Acts of the last session of the Parliament of Great Britain and the first session of the Parliament of the United Kingdom are both cited as "41 Geo. 3". Acts passed from 1963 onwards are simply cited by calendar year and chapter number.

== 2 Edw. 7 ==
The third session of the 27th Parliament of the United Kingdom, which met from 16 January 1902 until 18 December 1902.

No private acts were passed during this session.

This session was also traditionally cited as 2 Ed. 7 or 2 E. 7.

=== Public general acts ===
Short title	Citation	Royal assent
Long title
Consolidated Fund (No. 1) Act 1902 (repealed)	2 Edw. 7. c. 1	21 March 1902
An Act to apply certain sums out of the Consolidated Fund to the service of the years ending on the thirty-first day of March one thousand nine hundred and one, one thousand nine hundred and two, and one thousand nine hundred and three. (Repealed by Statute Law Revision Act 1927 (17 & 18 Geo. 5. c. 42))
Army (Annual) Act 1902 (repealed)	2 Edw. 7. c. 2	28 April 1902
An Act to provide, during Twelve Months, for the Discipline and Regulation of the Army. (Repealed by Statute Law Revision Act 1927 (17 & 18 Geo. 5. c. 42))
Agriculture and Technical Instruction (Ireland) Act 1902 (repealed)	2 Edw. 7. c. 3	23 June 1902
An Act to enable County Councils in Ireland to exclude Congested Districts from the Area of Charge for certain purposes. (Repealed by Statute Law (Repeals) Act 1993 (c. 50))
Loan Act 1902 (repealed)	2 Edw. 7. c. 4	23 June 1902
An Act to provide for raising money for the service of the year ending the thirty-first day of March nineteen hundred and three. (Repealed by Statute Law Revision Act 1927 (17 & 18 Geo. 5. c. 42))
Royal Naval Reserve Act 1902 (repealed)	2 Edw. 7. c. 5	22 July 1902
An Act to amend section one of the Royal Naval Reserve (Volunteer) Act, 1896. (Note: Royal Naval Reserve (Volunteer) Act 1896 (59 & 60 Vict. c. 33)) (Repealed by Reserve Forces Act 1980 (c. 9))
Wild Birds Protection Act 1902 (repealed)	2 Edw. 7. c. 6	22 July 1902
An Act to amend the Wild Birds Protection Acts. (Repealed by Protection of Birds Act 1954 (2 & 3 Eliz. 2. c. 30))
Finance Act 1902 (repealed)	2 Edw. 7. c. 7	22 July 1902
An Act to grant certain duties of Customs and Inland Revenue, to alter other duties, and to amend the Law relating to Customs and Inland Revenue and the National Debt, and to make other provision for the financial arrangements of the year. (Repealed by Statute Law (Repeals) Act 2008 (c. 12))
Cremation Act 1902	2 Edw. 7. c. 8	22 July 1902
An Act for the regulation of the burning of Human Remains, and to enable Burial Authorities to establish Crematoria. (Repealed for Scotland by Burial and Cremation (Scotland) Act 2016 (asp 20))
Prison Officers (Pensions) Act 1902 (repealed)	2 Edw. 7. c. 9	22 July 1902
An Act to amend the Prison Act, 1877, (Note: Prison Act 1877 (40 & 41 Vict. c. 21)) with respect to the Allowances of Prison Officers under section thirty-six of that Act. (Repealed by Statute Law Revision Act 1927 (17 & 18 Geo. 5. c. 42))
Police Reservists Act 1902 (repealed)	2 Edw. 7. c. 10	22 July 1902
An Act to amend the Law as to Pensions and Gratuities of Police Reservists called out on permanent service. (Repealed for England and Wales by Police (Superannuation) Act 1906 (6 Edw. 7. c. 7) and for Scotland by Police (Scotland) Act (1890) Amendment Act 1910 (10 Edw. 7 & 1 Geo. 5. c. 10))
Immoral Traffic (Scotland) Act 1902 (repealed)	2 Edw. 7. c. 11	22 July 1902
An Act to make further provision for the Punishment of Persons trading in Prostitution in Scotland. (Repealed by Sexual Offences (Scotland) Act 1976 (c. 67))
British Museum Act 1902 (repealed)	2 Edw. 7. c. 12	22 July 1902
An Act to enable the Trustees of the British Museum to remove certain newspapers and other printed matter from the present British Museum Buildings. (Repealed by British Museum Act 1963 (c. 24))
Labour Bureaux (London) Act 1902 (repealed)	2 Edw. 7. c. 13	22 July 1902
An Act to authorise the establishment of Labour Bureaux throughout the Metropolis. (Repealed by Statute Law (Repeals) Act 1973 (c. 39))
University of Wales Act 1902 (repealed)	2 Edw. 7. c. 14	22 July 1902
An Act to extend the privileges of the Graduates of the University of Wales. (Repealed by Statute Law (Repeals) Act 1998 (c. 43))
Musical (Summary Proceedings) Copyright Act 1902 (repealed)	2 Edw. 7. c. 15	22 July 1902
An Act to amend the Law relating to Musical Copyright. (Repealed by Copyright Act 1956 (4 & 5 Eliz. 2. c. 74))
Pauper Children (Ireland) Act 1902 (repealed)	2 Edw. 7. c. 16	22 July 1902
An Act to amend the Pauper Children (Ireland) Act, 1898. (Note: Pauper Children (Ireland) Act 1898 (61 & 62 Vict. c. 30)) (Repealed by Children and Young Persons Act (Northern Ireland) 1950 (c. 5 (N.I.)))
Midwives Act 1902 (repealed)	2 Edw. 7. c. 17	31 July 1902
An Act to secure the better training of Midwives, and to regulate their practice. (Repealed by Midwives Act 1951 (14 & 15 Geo. 6. c. 53))
Licensing (Ireland) Act 1902 (repealed)	2 Edw. 7. c. 18	31 July 1902
An Act to amend the Law relating to issue of Licences for the Sale of Intoxicating Liquours in Ireland. (Repealed by Intoxicating Liquor Act (Northern Ireland) 1923 (13 & 14 Geo. 5. c. 12 (N.I.)))
Education Act 1901 (Renewal) Act 1902 (repealed)	2 Edw. 7. c. 19	31 July 1902
An Act to renew the Education Act, 1901. (Note: Education Act 1901 (1 Edw. 7. c. 11)) (Repealed by Education Act 1918 (8 & 9 Geo. 5. c. 39))
Public Libraries (Ireland) Act 1902 (repealed)	2 Edw. 7. c. 20	8 August 1902
An Act to amend the Public Libraries (Ireland) Acts. (Repealed by Museums (Northern Ireland) Order 1981 (SI 1981/438 (N.I. 14)))
Shop Clubs Act 1902 (repealed)	2 Edw. 7. c. 21	8 August 1902
An Act to prohibit compulsory Membership of Unregistered Shop Clubs or Thrift Funds, and to regulate such as are duly registered. (Repealed by Wages Act 1986 (c. 48))
Public Works Loans Act 1902 (repealed)	2 Edw. 7. c. 22	8 August 1902
An Act to grant Money for the purpose of certain Local Loans out of the Local Loans Fund, and for other purposes relating to Local Loans. (Repealed by Statute Law Revision Act 1927 (17 & 18 Geo. 5. c. 42))
Isle of Man (Customs) Act 1902 (repealed)	2 Edw. 7. c. 23	8 August 1902
An Act to amend the Law with respect to Customs Duties in the Isle of Man. (Repealed by Statute Law Revision Act 1927 (17 & 18 Geo. 5. c. 42))
Marine Works (Ireland) Act 1902 (repealed)	2 Edw. 7. c. 24	8 August 1902
An Act to facilitate the execution and maintenance of Marine Works in Ireland, and for other like purposes. (Repealed by Public Works, etc., Loans Act (Northern Ireland) 1953 (c. 13 (N.I.)))
Lands Valuation (Scotland) Amendment Act 1902	2 Edw. 7. c. 25	8 August 1902
An Act to amend the Lands Valuation (Scotland) Acts in regard to the Law relating to the Rating of Machinery.
Pacific Cable (Amendment) Act 1902 (repealed)	2 Edw. 7. c. 26	8 August 1902
An Act to substitute the Government of the Commonwealth of Australia for the Governments of the States of New South Wales, Queensland and Victoria in the Pacific Cable Act, 1901. (Note: Pacific Cable Act 1901 (1 Edw. 7. c. 31)) (Repealed by Pacific Cable Act 1927 (17 & 18 Geo. 5. c. 9))
Appropriation Act 1902 (repealed)	2 Edw. 7. c. 27	8 August 1902
An Act to apply certain sums out of the Consolidated Fund to the service of the years ending on the thirty-first day of March one thousand nine hundred and one and one thousand nine hundred and three, and to appropriate the Supplies granted in this Session of Parliament. (Repealed by Statute Law Revision Act 1927 (17 & 18 Geo. 5. c. 42))
Licensing Act 1902	2 Edw. 7. c. 28	8 August 1902
An Act to amend the Law relating to the Sale of Intoxicating Liquors and to Drunkenness, and to provide for the Registration of Clubs.
Freshwater Fish (Scotland) Act 1902	2 Edw. 7. c. 29	8 August 1902
An Act for the better protection of Freshwater Fish in Scotland.
Appropriation (No. 2) Act 1902 (repealed)	2 Edw. 7. c. 30	25 November 1902
An Act to apply a sum out of the Consolidated Fund to the service of the year ending on the thirty-first day of March one thousand nine hundred and three, and to appropriate the further Supplies granted in this Session of Parliament. (Repealed by Statute Law Revision Act 1927 (17 & 18 Geo. 5. c. 42))
Supreme Court of Judicature Act 1902 (repealed)	2 Edw. 7. c. 31	25 November 1902
An Act to amend the Supreme Court of Judicature Acts. (Repealed by Supreme Court of Judicature (Consolidation) Act 1925 (15 & 16 Geo. 5. c. 49))
Expiring Laws Continuance Act 1902 (repealed)	2 Edw. 7. c. 32	18 December 1902
An Act to continue various Expiring Laws. (Repealed by Statute Law Revision Act 1927 (17 & 18 Geo. 5. c. 42))
Agriculture and Technical Instruction (Ireland) (No. 2) Act 1902 (repealed)	2 Edw. 7. c. 33	18 December 1902
An Act to provide for the payment of certain moneys to the Department of Agriculture and Technical Instruction for Ireland. (Repealed by Statute Law Revision Act 1927 (17 & 18 Geo. 5. c. 42))
Patents Act 1902 (repealed)	2 Edw. 7. c. 34	18 December 1902
An Act to amend the Law with reference to Applications for Patents and Compulsory Licences, and other matters connected therewith. (Repealed by Patents and Designs Act 1907 (7 Edw. 7. c. 29))
Electric Lighting (Scotland) Act 1902 (repealed)	2 Edw. 7. c. 35	18 December 1902
An Act to amend the borrowing provisions of the Electric Lighting Act, 1882, (Note: Electric Lighting Act 1882 (45 & 46 Vict. c. 56)) and the Electric Lighting (Scotland) Act, 1890. (Note: Electric Lighting (Scotland) Act 1890 (53 & 54 Vict. c. 13)) (Repealed by Electricity Act 1947 (10 & 11 Geo. 6. c. 54))
Mail Ships Act 1902 (repealed)	2 Edw. 7. c. 36	18 December 1902
An Act to amend the Mail Ships Act, 1891. (Note: Mail Ships Act 1891 (54 & 55 Vict. c. 31)) (Repealed by Statute Law Revision Act 1963 (c. 30))
Osborne Estate Act 1902	2 Edw. 7. c. 37	18 December 1902
An Act to make provision with respect to the disposition and management of His Majesty's Osborne Estate in the Isle of Wight.
Local Government (Ireland) Act 1902	2 Edw. 7. c. 38	18 December 1902
An Act to further amend the Law relating to Local Government in Ireland, and for other purposes connected therewith.
Militia and Yeomanry Act 1902 (repealed)	2 Edw. 7. c. 39	18 December 1902
An Act to amend the Law relating to the Militia and Yeomanry. (Repealed by Territorial Army and Militia Act 1921 (11 & 12 Geo. 5. c. 37))
Uganda Railway Act 1902 (repealed)	2 Edw. 7. c. 40	18 December 1902
An Act to provide further Money for the Uganda Railway. (Repealed by Statute Law Revision Act 1927 (17 & 18 Geo. 5. c. 42) and Statute Law Revision Act 1950 (14 Geo. 6. c. 6))
Metropolis Water Act 1902	2 Edw. 7. c. 41	18 December 1902
An Act for establishing a Water Board to manage the supply of Water within London and certain adjoining Districts, for transferring to the Water Board the undertakings of the Metropolitan Water Companies, and for other purposes connected therewith.
Education Act 1902 or the Balfour Act (repealed)	2 Edw. 7. c. 42	18 December 1902
An Act to make further provision with respect to Education in England and Wales. (Repealed by Education Act 1921 (11 & 12 Geo. 5. c. 51))

=== Local acts ===
Short title	Citation	Royal assent
Long title
Military Lands Provisional Orders Confirmation (No. 1) Act 1902 (repealed)	2 Edw. 7. c. i	28 April 1902
An Act to confirm certain Provisional Orders of the Secretary of State under the Military Lands Act 1892. (Note: Military Lands Act 1892 (55 & 56 Vict. c. 43)) (Repealed by Statute Law (Repeals) Act 2008 (c. 12))
Hamilton Gas Order Confirmation Act 1902	2 Edw. 7. c. ii	28 April 1902
An Act to confirm a Provisional Order under the Burgh Police (Scotland) Act 1892 (Note: Burgh Police (Scotland) Act 1892 (55 & 56 Vict. c. 55)) relating to Hamilton.
	Hamilton Gas Order 1902	
Lincoln and East Coast Railway and Dock (Abandonment) Act 1902 (repealed)	2 Edw. 7. c. iii	28 April 1902
An Act for the abandonment of the Lincoln and East Coast Railway and Dock and for other purposes. (Repealed by Statute Law (Repeals) Act 2013 (c. 2))
Central Argentine and Rosario Railway Act 1902	2 Edw. 7. c. iv	28 April 1902
An Act for the amalgamation of the undertakings of the Buenos Ayres and Rosario Railway Company Limited and the Central Argentine Railway Company Limited and for other purposes.
Finedon Urban District Water Act 1902	2 Edw. 7. c. v	28 April 1902
An Act to authorise the Urban District Council of Finedon to construct waterworks and to supply water and for other purposes.
Wadhurst Gas Act 1902	2 Edw. 7. c. vi	23 June 1902
An Act to incorporate the Wadhurst Gas Company and to enable that Company to supply with gas the parishes of Wadhurst Ticehurst and other places in the county of Sussex.
Liverpool Grain Storage and Transit Company Act 1902	2 Edw. 7. c. vii	23 June 1902
An Act to increase the nominal amount of the existing share capital of the Liverpool Grain Storage and Transit Company Limited and to convert the shares of the Company into stock and for other purposes.
London, Brighton and South Coast Railway Act 1902	2 Edw. 7. c. viii	23 June 1902
An Act to confer further powers on the London Brighton and South Coast Railway Company and on that Company and the London and South Western Railway Company with reference to their joint undertaking and for other purposes.
Wrexham Waterworks Act 1902	2 Edw. 7. c. ix	23 June 1902
An Act to confer further powers on the Wrexham Waterworks Company and for other purposes.
Shepton Mallet Gas Act 1902	2 Edw. 7. c. x	23 June 1902
An Act for incorporating and conferring powers on the Shepton Mallet Gas Company.
Darley Dale Water Act 1902	2 Edw. 7. c. xi	23 June 1902
An Act to authorise the Urban District Council of North Darley to construct waterworks and to supply water within the district and for other purposes.
Higham Ferrars and Rushden Water Board Act 1902	2 Edw. 7. c. xii	23 June 1902
An Act to constitute and incorporate a Joint Water Board consisting of representatives from the Councils of the Borough of Higham Ferrers and the Urban District of Rushden and to vest in such Board the powers of the Higham Ferrers Water Act 1900 (Note: Higham Ferrers Water Act 1900 (63 & 64 Vict. c. xxvii)) and for other purposes.
Brighton and Rottingdean Seashore Electric Tramroad Act 1902	2 Edw. 7. c. xiii	23 June 1902
An Act to authorise the Brighton and Rottingdean Seashore Electric Tramroad Company to divert a portion of their existing and authorised tramroad in the county of Sussex and to construct a new tramroad in lieu thereof and for other Purposes.
Reading Gas Act 1902	2 Edw. 7. c. xiv	23 June 1902
An Act for consolidating the capital of the Reading Gas Company for enabling that Company to raise additional capital and for other purposes.
Grand Junction Waterworks Act 1902	2 Edw. 7. c. xv	23 June 1902
An Act to empower the Grand Junction Waterworks Company to raise further money and for other purposes.
Bromley Gas Act 1902 (repealed)	2 Edw. 7. c. xvi	23 June 1902
An Act to convert the shares of the Brondey Gas Consumers Company into stock and to empower that Company to raise additional capital to make further provision with respect to the Company and their undertaking and for other purposes. (Repealed by South Suburban Gas Act 1928 (18 & 19 Geo. 5. c. lxxx))
Derbyshire and Nottinghamshire Electric Power Act 1902	2 Edw. 7. c. xvii	23 June 1902
An Act to amend the Derbyshire and Nottinghamshire Electric Power Act 1901. (Note: Derbyshire and Nottinghamshire Electric Power Act 1901 (1 Edw. 7. c. cxxi))
Birmingham Corporation Water Act 1902	2 Edw. 7. c. xviii	23 June 1902
An Act for extending the time limited by the Birmingham Corporation Water Act 1892 (Note: Birmingham Corporation Water Act 1892 (55 & 56 Vict. c. clxxiii)) for the construction of certain of the works authorised by the said Act and for amending certain provisions of the said Act and for empowering the Corporation of Birmingham to acquire additional lands for the purposes of the said Act and for other purposes.
Caterham and District Gas Act 1902 (repealed)	2 Edw. 7. c. xix	23 June 1902
An Act for incorporating and conferring powers on the Caterham and District Gas Company. (Repealed by Croydon Gas Order 1926 (SR&O 1926/999))
Barking Gas Act 1902	2 Edw. 7. c. xx	23 June 1902
An Act to empower the Barking Gas Company to raise additional capital to amend the Barking Gas Act 1867 (Note: Barking Gas Act 1867 (30 & 31 Vict. c. xviii)) and for other purposes.
Newcastle-upon-Tyne Electric Supply Company's Act 1902	2 Edw. 7. c. xxi	23 June 1902
An Act to confer further powers upon the Newcastle-upon-Tyne Electric Supply Company Limited for the construction of works and the supply of electrical energy and for other purposes.
Great Eastern Railway Act 1902	2 Edw. 7. c. xxii	23 June 1902
An Act for confering further powers on the Great Eastern Railway Company in respect of their own undertaking and other undertakings in which they are interested jointly with other companies for vesting in them the undertaking of the Northern and Eastern Railway Company for authorising agreements between them and the London Brighton and South Coast Railway Company and for other purposes.
North Warwickshire Water Act 1902	2 Edw. 7. c. xxiii	23 June 1902
An Act to provide for the better definition of the terms of transfer by the North Warwickshire Water Company of a portion of their undertaking to the Corporation of Coventry to authorise the Company to acquire land and construct works and to enlarge their area of supply and for other purposes.
Manchester and Liverpool Electric Express Railway Act 1902	2 Edw. 7. c. xxiv	23 June 1902
An Act for conferring further powers upon the Manchester and Liverpool Electric Express Railway Company and for other purposes.
Fareham Gas Act 1902	2 Edw. 7. c. xxv	23 June 1902
An Act to authorise the Fareham Gas and Coke Company to acquire additional lands to construct additional works to raise additional capital to amend their existing Act and for other purposes.
Isle of Wight Central Railway Act 1902	2 Edw. 7. c. xxvi	23 June 1902
An Act for empowering the Isle of Wight Central Railway Company to raise further moneys.
Birmingham Assay Office Act 1902	2 Edw. 7. c. xxvii	23 June 1902
An Act to confer further powers on the Birmingham Assay Office in relation to the application of their funds and otherwise.
Deal and Walmer Gas Act 1902	2 Edw. 7. c. xxviii	23 June 1902
An Act to confer further powers on the Deal and Walmer Gas Company and for other purposes.
Donegal Railway Act 1902	2 Edw. 7. c. xxix	23 June 1902
An Act for attaching a preference to the capital to be issued for the Ballyshannon Extension for the consolidation and conversion of the capital of the Company to repeal the provisions of former Acts as to separate undertakings to further extend the time for the completion of the Ballyshannon Extension to authorise the Company to work its undertaking by electricity and for other purposes.
Plymouth, Devonport and South Western Junction Railway Act 1902	2 Edw. 7. c. xxx	23 June 1902
An Act for constituting the Bere Alston and Calstock Light Railway and a portion of the East Cornwall Mineral Railway a separate undertaking and for other purposes.
South Western Railway Act 1902	2 Edw. 7. c. xxxi	23 June 1902
An Act to authorise the London and South Western Railway Company to execute further works to acquire additional lands and to raise further money to empower the Company and the Great Western Railway Company or one of them to acquire additional lands for enlarging Portland Station to confirm a lease to the Company of the Padstow separate undertaking of the North Cornwall Railway Company and an agreement made by the Company with the vicar and churchwardens of the parish of St. John Waterloo Road to extend the periods limited for the completion of works and the purchase of lands under certain Acts relating to the Company and to confer further powers upon the Company and for other purposes.
Street Urban District Water Act 1902	2 Edw. 7. c. xxxii	23 June 1902
An Act to authorise the Urban District Council of Street to construct waterworks for the supply of the urban district and for other purposes.
Tyne Improvement Act 1902	2 Edw. 7. c. xxxiii	23 June 1902
An Act for empowering the Tyne Improvement Commissioners to construct new landing-stages and other works and for enlarging the powers of the Commissioners with respect to their ferries and for other purposes.
Cornwall Electric Power Act 1902	2 Edw. 7. c. xxxiv	23 June 1902
An Act for incorporating and conferring powers on the Cornwall Electric Power Company.
Waterford and Bishop Foy Endowed Schools Act 1902 (repealed)	2 Edw. 7. c. xxxv	23 June 1902
An Act to provide for the amalgamation of certain schools in or near the city of Waterford to authorise the establishment of a primary and also of a secondary school in or near the said city to constitute a governing body for the maintenance and control of the new schools to vest certain property and endowments in and to confer divers powers for the management of the new schools on the said body and for other purposes. (Repealed by Statute Law (Repeals) Act 2013 (c. 2))
School Board for London (Superannuation Scheme) Act 1902 (repealed)	2 Edw. 7. c. xxxvi	23 June 1902
An Act to make provision with respect to superannuation and other allowances granted or to be granted by the School Board for London and for other purposes. (Repealed by London County Council (General Powers) Act 1911 (1 & 2 Geo. 5. c. lxiii))
Chigwell, Loughton and Woodford Gas Act 1902	2 Edw. 7. c. xxxvii	23 June 1902
An Act to confer further powers on the Chigwell Loughton and Woodford Gas Company and for other purposes.
Scottish Equitable Life Assurance Society Act 1902 (repealed)	2 Edw. 7. c. xxxviii	23 June 1902
An Act to repeal the deed of constitution charters and Acts of the Scottish Equitable Life Assurance Society and to consolidate their provisions or some of them with amendments to confer further powers on that Society and for other purposes! (Repealed by Scottish Equitable Life Assurance Society Act 1979 (c. xiv))
Leyland and Farington Gas Act 1902 (repealed)	2 Edw. 7. c. xxxix	23 June 1902
An Act to authorise the Leyland and Farington Gas Company to convert their existing share capital to raise further capital and for other purposes. (Repealed by County of Lancashire Act 1984 (c. xxi))
Limpsfield and Oxted Water Act 1902	2 Edw. 7. c. xl	23 June 1902
An Act to authorise the Limpsfield and Oxted Water Company to make additional waterworks to extend the limits of supply of the Company to raise additional capital to confer further powers upon the Company and for other purposes.
Manchester Corporation Tramways Act 1902	2 Edw. 7. c. xli	23 June 1902
An Act to authorise the Corporation of Manchester to construct additional tramways in the city to empower the Corporation to purchase a short length of tramway beyond the city and for other purposes.
Swindon United Gas Act 1902	2 Edw. 7. c. xlii	23 June 1902
An Act to confer further powers on the New Swindon Gas Company to authorise the transfer to that Company of the undertaking of the Swindon Gas and Coke Company Limited to change the name of the New Swindon Gas Company and for other purposes.
Newcastle and Gateshead Waterworks Act 1902	2 Edw. 7. c. xliii	23 June 1902
An Act to empower the Newcastle and Gateshead Water Company to construct an enlarged reservoir on the River Rede and other works and for other purposes.
Ashton-under-Lyne and Dukinfield Corporations (Alma Bridge, &c.) Act 1902	2 Edw. 7. c. xliv	23 June 1902
An Act to empower the Corporations of Ashton-under-Lyne and Dukinfield to acquire the Alma Bridge and the approaches thereto to confer further powers upon the Corporation of Ashton-under-Lyne in regard to their tramway and electric lighting undertakings and for other purposes.
Abercarn Urban District Gas Act 1902	2 Edw. 7. c. xlv	23 June 1902
An Act to empower the Urban District Council of Abercarn to purchase the undertaking of the Abercarn and Newbridge Gas and Water Company and to supply gas and for other purposes.
Furness Railway (Steam Vessels) Act 1902	2 Edw. 7. c. xlvi	23 June 1902
An Act to empower the Furness Railway Company to run steam vessels between Barrow and Fleetwood Belfast Larne and the Isle of Man and for other purposes.
Middlesex County Council Tramways Act 1902 (repealed)	2 Edw. 7. c. xlvii	23 June 1902
An Act for empowering the County Council of Middlesex to exercise certain powers vested in local authorities under the Tramways Act 1870 (Note: Tramways Act 1870 (33 & 34 Vict. c. 78)) and for other purposes. (Repealed by Middlesex County Council Act 1944 (7 & 8 Geo. 6. c.xxi))
Abertillery Urban District Council Act 1902	2 Edw. 7. c. xlviii	23 June 1902
An Act to empower the Urban District Council of Abertillery to construct additional waterworks and to make further provision in regard to the water undertaking of the Council and as to the supply of electricity and for other purposes.
Bradford-on-Avon Gas Act 1902	2 Edw. 7. c. xlix	23 June 1902
An Act for incorporating and conferring powers upon the Bradford-on-Avon Gas Company and for other purposes.
Dublin, Wicklow and Wexford Railway Act 1902	2 Edw. 7. c. l	23 June 1902
An Act to confer further powers on the Dublin Wicklow and Wexford Railway Company in relation to their several undertakings and for other purposes.
Renfrew Harbour Act 1902 (repealed)	2 Edw. 7. c. li	23 June 1902
An Act to extend the periods limited by the Renfrew Burgh and Harbour Extension Act 1899 (Note: Renfrew Burgh and Harbour Extension Act 1899 (62 & 63 Vict. c. ccxiv)) for the compulsory purchase of lands and the completion of the works by that Act authorised and for other purposes. (Repealed by Clyde Navigation Act 1905 (5 Edw. 7. c. xxxiii))
Swansea Corporation Water Act 1902 (repealed)	2 Edw. 7. c. lii	23 June 1902
An Act to extend the time limited by the Swansea Corporation Water Act 1892 (Note: Swansea Corporation Water Act 1892 (55 & 56 Vict. c. cxxxiii)) for the construction of the works authorised by that Act and to confer further powers upon the Mayor Aldermen and Burgesses of the borough of Swansea in regard to their water undertaking and for other purposes. (Repealed by West Glamorgan Water Board Order 1966 (SI 1966/1096))
Tiverton Market Act 1902	2 Edw. 7. c. liii	23 June 1902
An Act to make provision as to the application of the moneys arising from the markets held within the borough of Tiverton in the county of Devon and as to the payment of the suras secured by mortgage on such markets and for other purposes.
Dartford Improvement Act 1902 (repealed)	2 Edw. 7. c. liv	23 June 1902
An Act to authorise the Urban District Council of Dartford to establish and maintain markets and fairs and to acquire existing markets and market rights and to construct street improvements and to make further provision with regard to the electric light undertaking of the Council and for the improvement health local government and finance of the district and for other purposes. (Repealed by County of Kent Act 1981 (c. xviii))
Gloucestershire Electric Power Act 1902	2 Edw. 7. c. lv	23 June 1902
An Act for incorporating and conferring powers on the Gloucestershire Electric Power Company and for other purposes.
Lancashire County (Lunatic Asylums) Act 1902 (repealed)	2 Edw. 7. c. lvi	23 June 1902
An Act to alter and amend the Lancashire County (Lunatic Asylums and other Powers) Act 1891 (Note: Lancashire County (Lunatic Asylums and other Powers) Act 1891 (54 & 55 Vict. c. xx)) and to alter the mode of contribution to the expenses of the Lancashire Asylums Board. (Repealed by County of Lancashire Act 1984 (c. xxi))
Rathmines and Rathgar Urban District Council Act 1902	2 Edw. 7. c. lvii	23 June 1902
An Act to confer powers on the Urban District Council of Rathmines and Rathgar in the county of Dublin with respect to buildings streets and sanitary and other matters for the improvement and good government of their district to take over and maintain a certain road in their district as a public road to acquire by agreement a certain piece of land in their district and lay out and maintain the same as a public park to borrow moneys and for other purposes.
Bournemouth Gas and Water (Poole Gas Transfer) Act 1902	2 Edw. 7. c. lviii	23 June 1902
An Act to authorise the acquisition by the Bournemouth Gas and Water Company of the undertaking of the Town and County of Poole Gas and Coke Company Limited to extend the limits for the supply of gas by the Bournemouth Gas and Water Company and to authorise that Company to raise additional capital and for other purposes.
Preston Corporation Act 1902 (repealed)	2 Edw. 7. c. lix	23 June 1902
An Act to enable the Mayor Aldermen and Burgesses of the borough of Preston to reconstruct their existing and to construct additional tramways in and adjacent to the borough and to make provision with respect to children trading in the streets and for other purposes. (Repealed by County of Lancashire Act 1984 (c. xxi))
Scarborough Tramways Act 1902	2 Edw. 7. c. lx	23 June 1902
An Act to incorporate the Scarborough Tramways Company and to empower that Company to make and maintain tramways and to execute certain street works in the borough of Scarborough and for other purposes.
Longwood Gas Act 1902	2 Edw. 7. c. lxi	23 June 1902
An Act for conferring further powers upon the Longwood Gas Company and for other purposes.
Birkenhead Corporation Act 1902	2 Edw. 7. c. lxii	23 June 1902
An Act to empower the Mayor Aldermen and Burgesses of the borough of Birkenhead to acquire Hamilton Square Gardens and other lands and to confer on them further powers for the supply of electrical energy and for the control of children trading in the streets and further powers in relation to financial matters and for other purposes.
Erdington Tramways Act 1902	2 Edw. 7. c. lxiii	23 June 1902
An Act to empower the Urban District Council of Erdington to construct and work tramways and for other purposes.
Rhymney Railway Act 1902	2 Edw. 7. c. lxiv	23 June 1902
An Act to confer further powers upon the Rhymney Railway Company for the construction of railways and for other purposes.
Metropolitan Police Provisional Order Confirmation Act 1902 (repealed)	2 Edw. 7. c. lxv	23 June 1902
An Act to confirm a Provisional Order made by one of His Majesty's Principal Secretaries of State under the Metropolitan Police Act 1886 (Note: Metropolitan Police Act 1886 (49 & 50 Vict. c. 22)) and the Metropolitan Police Courts Act 1897 (Note: Metropolitan Police Courts Act 1897 (60 & 61 Vict. c. 26)) relating to land in the parish of St. Leonard Shoreditch. (Repealed by Statute Law (Repeals) Act 2008 (c. 12))
Dundee Corporation Libraries Order Confirmation Act 1902 (repealed)	2 Edw. 7. c. lxvi	23 June 1902
An Act to confirm a Provisional Order under the Private Legislation Procedure (Scotland) Act 1899 (Note: Private Legislation Procedure (Scotland) Act 1899 (62 & 63 Vict. c. 47)) relating to Dundee Corporation Libraries. (Repealed by Dundee Corporation (Administration and General Powers) Order Confirmation Act 1950 (14 Geo. 6. c. i))
	Dundee Corporation Libraries Order 1902	
Electric Lighting Orders Confirmation (No. 2) Act 1902	2 Edw. 7. c. lxvii	23 June 1902
An Act to confirm certain Provisional Orders made by the Board of Trade under the Electric Lighting Acts 1882 (Note: Electric Lighting Act 1882 (45 & 46 Vict. c. 56)) and 1888 (Note: Electric Lighting Act 1888 (51 & 52 Vict. c. 12)) relating to Beeston Carnarvon Eston Hebden Bridge Mytholmroyd Otley South Bank in Normanby Stockton (Rural District) Thornaby-on-Tees and Tipton.
	Beeston Urban District Council Electric Lighting Order 1902	
	Carnarvon Electric Lighting Order 1902	
	Eston Electric Lighting Order 1902	
	Hebden Bridge Electric Lighting Order 1902	
	Mytholmroyd Electric Lighting Order 1902	
	Otley Electric Lighting Order 1902	
	South Bank in Normanby Electric Lighting Order 1902	
	Stockton Rural District Electric Lighting Order 1902	
	Thornaby-on-Tees Electric Lighting Order 1902	
	Tipton Electric Lighting Order 1902	
Electric Lighting Orders Confirmation (No. 3) Act 1902	2 Edw. 7. c. lxviii	23 June 1902
An Act to confirm certain Provisional Orders made by the Board of Trade under the Electric Lighting Acts 1882 and 1888 relating to Abram Holyhead Hucknall Torkard Leyland Louth Penarth Saddleworth Springhead Tyldesley-with-Shakerley and Westhoughton.
	Abram Electric Lighting Order 1902	
	Holyhead Electric Lighting Order 1902	
	Hucknall Torkard Electric Lighting Order 1902	
	Leyland Electric Lighting Order 1902	
	Louth Electric Lighting Order 1902	
	Penarth Electric Lighting Order 1902	
	Saddleworth Electric Lighting Order 1902	
	Springhead Electric Lighting Order 1902	
	Tyldesley-with-Shakerley Electric Lighting Order 1902	
	Westhoughton Electric Lighting Order 1902	
Electric Lighting Orders Confirmation (No. 4) Act 1902	2 Edw. 7. c. lxix	23 June 1902
An Act to confirm certain Provisional Orders made by the Board of Trade under the Electric Lighting Acts 1882 and 1888 relating to Aberdare Amble Dover Frinton-on-Sea Gillingham (Kent) Hindhead and District Leadgate Leatherhead District (Ashtead and Mickleham) Paignton and Stanley (Durham).
	Aberdare Electric Lighting Order 1902	
	Amble Electric Lighting Order 1902	
	Dover Electric Lighting Order 1902	
	Frinton-on-Sea Electric Lighting Order 1902	
	Gillingham (Kent) Electric Lighting Order 1902	
	Hindhead and District Electric Lighting Order 1902	
	Leadgate Electric Lighting Order 1902	
	Leatherhead District (Ashtead and Mickleham) Electric Lighting Order 1902	
	Paignton Electric Lighting Order 1902	
	Stanley (Durham) Electric Lighting Order 1902	
Local Government Board's Provisional Orders Confirmation (No. 1) Act 1902	2 Edw. 7. c. lxx	23 June 1902
An Act to confirm certain Provisional Orders of the Local Government Board relating to Cirencester Daventry (Rural) Oldbury Ramsgate Rotherham Scarborough and Southampton.
	Cirencester Order 1902	
	Daventry Rural Order 1902	
	Oldbury Order 1902	
	Ramsgate Order 1902	
	Rotherham Order 1902	
	Scarborough Order 1902	
	Southampton Order 1902	
Local Government Board (Ireland) Provisional Order Confirmation (No. 1) Act 1902	2 Edw. 7. c. lxxi	23 June 1902
An Act to confirm a Provisional Order of the Local Government Board for Ireland relating to the town of Mallow.
	Mallow Urban District Order 1902	
Coatbridge Gas Order Confirmation Act 1902	2 Edw. 7. c. lxxii	23 June 1902
An Act to confirm a Provisional Order under the Private Legislation Procedure (Scotland) Act 1899 relating to Coatbridge Gas.
	Coatbridge Gas Order 1902	
Military Lands Provisional Order Confirmation (No. 2) Act 1902 (repealed)	2 Edw. 7. c. lxxiii	23 June 1902
An Act to confirm a Provisional Order of the Secretary of State under the Military Lands Act 1892. (Repealed by Statute Law (Repeals) Act 2008 (c. 12))
Drainage and Improvement of Lands Supplemental (Ireland) Act 1902	2 Edw. 7. c. lxxiv	23 June 1902
An Act to confirm a Provisional Order under the Drainage and Improvement of Lands (Ireland) Act 1863 (Note: Drainage and Improvement of Lands (Ireland) Act 1863 (26 & 27 Vict. c. 88)) and the Acts amending the same relating to the Dunderry Drainage District in the county of Meath.
	Dunderry Drainage District Provisional Order 1902	
London Government Scheme (Borough of Southwark) Confirmation Act 1902	2 Edw. 7. c. lxxv	22 July 1902
An Act to confirm a Scheme made under the London Government Act 1899 (Note: London Government Act 1899 (62 & 63 Vict. c. 14)) relating to the Metropolitan Borough of Southwark.
	Borough of Southwark (Adoptive Acts) Scheme 1901.	
Pilotage Order Confirmation Act 1902 (repealed)	2 Edw. 7. c. lxxvi	22 July 1902
An Act to confirm a Provisional Order made by the Board of Trade under the Merchant Shipping Act 1894 (Note: Merchant Shipping Act 1894 (57 & 58 Vict. c. 60)) relating to the Pilotage District of the Corporation of the Trinity House of Newcastle-upon-Tyne. (Repealed by Statute Law (Repeals) Act 1995 (c. 44))
Pier and Harbour Orders Confirmation (No. 2) Act 1902	2 Edw. 7. c. lxxvii	22 July 1902
An Act to confirm certain Provisional Orders made by the Board of Trade under the General Pier and Harbour Act 1861 (Note: General Pier and Harbour Act 1861 (24 & 25 Vict. c. 45)) relating to Brownies Taing and St. Margaret's Hope.
	Brownies Taing Pier Order 1902	
	St. Margaret's Hope Pier Order 1902	
Oyster and Mussel Fisheries Orders Confirmation Act 1902	2 Edw. 7. c. lxxviii	22 July 1902
An Act to confirm Orders made by the Board of Trade under the Sea Fisheries Act 1868 (Note: Sea Fisheries Act 1868 (31 & 32 Vict. c. 45)) relating to Boston and to the Estuary of the River Tees.
	Boston Fishery Order 1902	
Local Government Board's Provisional Orders Confirmation (No. 2) Act 1902	2 Edw. 7. c. lxxix	22 July 1902
An Act to confirm certain Provisional Orders of the Local Government Board relating to Acton Biggleswade (Rural) Dorchester Durham (Rural) East Barnet Valley Pontypridd Richmond (Surrey) Watford (Rural) and Worcester.
	Acton Order 1902	
	Biggleswade Rural Order 1902	
	Dorchester Order 1902	
	Durham Rural Order 1902	
	East Barnet Valley Order 1902	
	Pontypridd Order 1902	
	Richmond (Surrey) Order 1902	
	Watford Rural Order 1902	
	Worcester Order 1902	
Local Government Board's Provisional Orders Confirmation (No. 3) Act 1902	2 Edw. 7. c. lxxx	22 July 1902
An Act to confirm certain Provisional Orders of the Local Government Board relating to Atherton Burnley St. Helen's Tottenham and Wallasey.
	Atherton Order 1902	
	Burnley Order 1902	
	St. Helens Order 1902	
	Tottenham Order 1902	
	Wallasey Order 1902	
Local Government Board's Provisional Orders Confirmation (No. 5) Act 1902	2 Edw. 7. c. lxxxi	22 July 1902
An Act to confirm certain Provisional Orders of the Local Government Board relating to Barnsley Chadderton Farnworth Sevenoaks (Rural) Stratford-upon-Avon Wells West Bromwich and Yeovil.
	Barnsley Order 1902	
	Chadderton Order 1902	
	Farnworth Order 1902	
	Sevenoaks Rural (Penshurst) Order 1902	
	Stratford-upon-Avon Order 1902	
	Wells Order 1902	
	West Bromwich Order 1902	
	Yeovil Order 1902	
Local Government Board's Provisional Orders Confirmation (No. 8) Act 1902	2 Edw. 7. c. lxxxii	22 July 1902
An Act to confirm certain Provisional Orders of the Local Government Board relating to the Biggleswade the Birmingham Tame and Rea the Chelmsford the Upper Stour Valley and the Watford United Districts.
	Biggleswade Joint Hospital Order 1902	
	Birmingham Tame and Rea Main Sewerage Order 1902	
	Chelmsford Joint Hospital Order 1902	
	Watford Joint Hospital Order 1902	
Local Government Board's Provisional Orders Confirmation (No. 9) Act 1902	2 Edw. 7. c. lxxxiii	22 July 1902
An Act to confirm certain Provisional Orders of the Local Government Hoard relating to Darlington Hawarden (Rural) Linslade Settle (Rural) Sheffield and Sunderland.
	Darlington Order 1902	
	Hawarden Rural Order 1902	
	Linslade Order 1902	
	Settle Rural Order 1902	
	Sheffield Order (No. 2) 1902	
	Sunderland Order 1902	
Local Government Board's Provisional Orders Confirmation (No. 11) Act 1902	2 Edw. 7. c. lxxxiv	22 July 1902
An Act to confirm certain Provisional Orders of the Local Government Board relating to Blackpool (two) Cardiff Hornsey Leeds Southport and Swindon.
	Blackpool Order (No. 1) 1902	
	Blackpool Order (No. 2) 1902	
	Cardiff Order 1902	
	Hornsey Order 1902	
	Leeds Order 1902	
	Southport Order 1902	
	Swindon Order 1902	
Local Government Board's Provisional Orders Confirmation (No. 13) Act 1902	2 Edw. 7. c. lxxxv	22 July 1902
An Act to confirm certain Provisional Orders of the Local Government Board relating to Barry Bromsgrove (Rural) Caerphilly Chiswick Middleton and Oakengates.
	Barry Order 1902	
	Bromsgrove Rural Order 1902	
	Caerphilly Order 1902	
	Chiswick Order 1902	
	Middleton Order 1902	
	Oakengates Order 1902	
Local Government Board's Provisional Orders Confirmation (No. 14) Act 1902	2 Edw. 7. c. lxxxvi	22 July 1902
An Act to confirm certain Provisional Orders of the Local Government Board relating to the Barley-in-Wharfedale and Menston the Hanley Stoke and Fenton the North Staffordshire the Tunbridge Wells Tonbridge and Southborough and the Waltham United Districts.
	Burley-in-Wharfedale and Menston Joint Sewerage Order 1902	
	Hanley Stoke and Fenton Joint Hospital Order 1902	
	North Staffordshire Joint Smallpox Hospital Order 1902	
	Tunbridge Wells, Tonbridge and Southborough Joint Hospital Order 1902	
	Waltham Joint Hospital Order 1902	
Local Government Board's Provisional Order Confirmation (No. 15) Act 1902	2 Edw. 7. c. lxxxvii	22 July 1902
An Act to confirm a Provisional Order of the Local Government Board relating to Newton Abbot.
	Newton Abbot Market Order 1902	
Local Government Board's Provisional Order Confirmation (Gas) Act 1902	2 Edw. 7. c. lxxxviii	22 July 1902
An Act to confirm a Provisional Order of the Local Government Board relating to Silsden.
	Silsden Gas Order 1902	
Local Government Board's Provisional Orders Confirmation (Housing of Working Classes) Act 1902	2 Edw. 7. c. lxxxix	22 July 1902
An Act to confirm certain Provisional Orders of the Local Government Board relating to Birkenhead Bradford (Yorks) and Liverpool.
	Birkenhead Order 1902	
	Bradford Order 1902	
	Liverpool Order 1902	
Local Government Board's Provisional Order Confirmation (Poor Law) Act 1902	2 Edw. 7. c. xc	22 July 1902
An Act to confirm a Provisional Order of the Local Government Board relating to the Metropolitan Asylum District.
	Metropolitan Asylum District Order 1902	
Electric Lighting Orders Confirmation (No. 1) Act 1902	2 Edw. 7. c. xci	22 July 1902
An Act to confirm certain Provisional Orders made by the Board of Trade under the Electric Lighting Acts 1882 and 1888 relating to Edmonton Enfield Tottenham and Wood Green.
	Edmonton Electric Lighting Order 1902	
	Enfield Electric Lighting Order 1902	
	Tottenham Electric Lighting Order 1902	
	Wood Green Electric Lighting Order 1902	
Local Government Board (Ireland) Provisional Orders Confirmation (No. 2) Act 1902	2 Edw. 7. c. xcii	22 July 1902
An Act to confirm certain Provisional Orders of the Local Government Board for Ireland relating to the Urban Districts of Dungarvan Fermoy Kilkenny (two) and Templemore and the Rural District of Dungarvan.
	Dungarvan Order 1902	
	Fermoy Urban Order 1902	
	Kilkenny Order 1902	
	Templemore Order 1902	
	Dungarvan Rural Order 1902	
Local Government Board (Ireland) Provisional Orders Confirmation (No. 3) Act 1902	2 Edw. 7. c. xciii	22 July 1902
An Act to confirm certain Provisional Orders of the Local Government Board for Ireland relating to the Dungar Joint Burial Board and the Portadown and Banbridge Joint Waterworks Board.
	Dungar Joint Burial Board Order 1902	
	Portadown and Banbridge Joint Waterworks Board Order 1902	
Local Government Board (Ireland) Provisional Orders Confirmation (No. 4) Act 1902	2 Edw. 7. c. xciv	22 July 1902
An Act to confirm certain Provisional Orders of the Local Government Board for Ireland relating to the Rural Districts of Bantry and Mountmelick the Port of Galway and the Richmond Lunatic Asylum District.
	Bantry Rural Order 1902	
	Rosenallis Burial Ground Order 1902	
	Galway Port Sanitary Order 1902	
	Richmond Lunatic Asylum Order 1902	
Local Government Board (Ireland) Provisional Orders Confirmation (Gas) Act 1902	2 Edw. 7. c. xcv	22 July 1902
Au Act to confirm certain Provisional Orders of the Local Government Board for Ireland relating to the Urban Districts of Ballymena and Strabane.
	Ballymena Gas Order 1902	
	Strabane Gas Order 1902	
Local Government Board (Ireland) Provisional Orders Confirmation (Housing of Working Classes) Act 1902	2 Edw. 7. c. xcvi	22 July 1902
An Act to confirm certain Provisional Orders of the Local Government Board for Ireland relating to the Urban Districts of Birr and Blackrock.
	Birr Order 1902	
	Blackrock (No. 1) Order 1902	
Local Government Board (Ireland) Provisional Order Confirmation (Housing of Working Classes) (No. 2) Act 1902	2 Edw. 7. c. xcvii	22 July 1902
An Act to confirm a Provisional Order of the Local Government Board for Ireland relating to the Urban District of Blackrock.
	Blackrock (No. 2) Order 1902	
Paisley Gas Order Confirmation Act 1902	2 Edw. 7. c. xcviii	22 July 1902
	Paisley Gas Order 1902 An Act to confirm a Provisional Order under the Burgh Police (Scotland) Act 1892 relating to Paisley.	
London (Poplar) Provisional Order Confirmation Act 1902	2 Edw. 7. c. xcix	22 July 1902
An Act to confirm a Provisional Order made by one of His Majesty's Principal Secretaries of State under the Housing of the Working Classes Act 1890 (Note: Housing of the Working Classes Act 1890 (53 & 54 Vict. c. 70)) relating to a certain area in the Parish of Poplar.
	London (Poplar) Order 1902	
Buckie Burgh Extension and Buckie (Craigenroan) Harbour Order Confirmation Act 1902 (repealed)	2 Edw. 7. c. c	22 July 1902
An Act to confirm a Provisional Order under the Private Legislation Procedure (Scotland) Act 1899 relating to Buckie Burgh Extension and Buckie (Craigenroan) Harbour. (Repealed by Grampian Regional Council (Harbours) Order Confirmation Act 1987 (c. x))
	Buckie Burgh Extension and Buckie (Craigenroan) Harbour Order 1902	
Irvine Corporation Order Confirmation Act 1902 (repealed)	2 Edw. 7. c. ci	22 July 1902
An Act to confirm a Provisional Order under the Private Legislation Procedure (Scotland) Act 1899 relating to Irvine Corporation. (Repealed by Irvine and District Water Board Order 1961 (SI 1961/872))
	Irvine Corporation Order 1902	
Stonehaven Town Hall Order Confirmation Act 1902	2 Edw. 7. c. cii	22 July 1902
An Act to confirm a Provisional Order under the Private Legislation Procedure (Scotland) Act 1899 relating to Stonehaven Town Hall.
	Stonehaven Town Hall Order 1902	
Gas Orders Confirmation (No. 1) Act 1902	2 Edw. 7. c. ciii	22 July 1902
An Act to confirm certain Provisional Orders made by the Board of Trade under the Gas and Water Works Facilities Act 1870 (Note: Gas and Water Works Facilities Act 1870 (33 & 34 Vict. c. 70)) relating to Bothwell and Uddingston Gas Cirencester Gas Garw and Ogmore Gas Rothwell Gas Skegness Gas and Wellingborough Gas.
	Bothwell and Uddingston Gas Order 1902	
	Cirencester Gas Order 1902	
	Garw and Ogmore Gas Order 1902	
	Rothwell Gas Order 1902	
	Skegness Gas Order 1902	
	Wellingborough Gas Order 1902	
Rothesay Tramways (Extension) Order Confirmation Act 1902	2 Edw. 7. c. civ	22 July 1902
An Act to confirm a Provisional Order under the Private Legislation Procedure (Scotland) Act 1899 relating to Rothesay Tramways.
	Rothesay Tramways (Extension) Order 1902	
West Hampshire Water Act 1902	2 Edw. 7. c. cv	22 July 1902
An Act to extend the limits for the supply of water by the West Hampshire Water Company and to confer further powers upon that Company for raising capital and for other purposes.
Castleblayney Keady and Armagh Railway Act 1902	2 Edw. 7. c. cvi	22 July 1902
An Act to empower the Kingscourt Keady and Armagh Railway Company to construct a new railway in the county of Monaghan and to abandon a portion of their authorised railways to change the name of the Company to authorise the Great Northern Railway Company (Ireland) to work the undertaking of the Company and to subscribe towards their capital and for other purposes.
Bedford Corporation Water Act 1902 (repealed)	2 Edw. 7. c. cvii	22 July 1902
An Act to authorise the Corporation of Bedford to construct waterworks and for other purposes. (Repealed by Statute Law (Repeals) Act 1995 (c. 44))
South Metropolitan Gas Act 1902	2 Edw. 7. c. cviii	22 July 1902
An Act to empower the South Metropolitan Gas Company to acquire additional lands for the manufacture of gas and for other purposes.
Belfast Corporation Act 1902	2 Edw. 7. c. cix	22 July 1902
An Act to empower the Lord Mayor Aldermen and Citizens of the city of Belfast to purchase lands for purposes of a public hall to dedicate ground for hospital purposes to amend several of the local Acts in force in Belfast and to confer various powers on the Corporation.
Broadstairs Gas Act 1902	2 Edw. 7. c. cx	22 July 1902
An Act for conferring further powers on the Broadstairs Gas Company.
Rickmansworth Gas Act 1902	2 Edw. 7. c. cxi	22 July 1902
An Act for incorporating and conferring powers on the Rickmansworth Gas Company.
Great Northern Railway Act 1902	2 Edw. 7. c. cxii	22 July 1902
An Act to confer further powers upon the Great Northern Railway Company.
Bradford Corporation Act 1902 (repealed)	2 Edw. 7. c. cxiii	22 July 1902
An Act to authorise the Mayor Aldermen and Citizens of the city of Bradford in the West Riding of the county of York to construct additional tramways waterworks and street improvements to acquire certain gas undertakings and to extend their limits of supply for gas to purchase the rights and interests of the Shelf Tramways Company Limited and to make further provision for the health and good government of the city and for other purposes. (Repealed by West Yorkshire Act 1980 (c. xiv))
Northumberland Electric Tramways Act 1902	2 Edw. 7. c. cxiv	22 July 1902
An Act to empower the Northern Counties Electricity Supply Company Limited to construct tramways and tramroads from Morpeth to Bedlington and Ashington to Newbiggin to make certain street widenings and for other purposes.
Rusthall Manor Act 1902	2 Edw. 7. c. cxv	22 July 1902
An Act to provide for the revision of the register of freehold tenants of the Manor of Rusthall and for better defining and regulating their rights and for amending the Rusthall Manor Acts 1739 (Note: Rusthall Manor Act 1739 (13 Geo. 2. c. 11)) and 1863 (Note: Rusthall Manor Act 1863 (26 & 27 Vict. c. lxxi)) and for other purposes.
City of London (Public Health) Act 1902	2 Edw. 7. c. cxvi	22 July 1902
An Act for regulating the removal of house refuse and the materials arising from the demolition of buildings within the City and the nuisances caused by such demolition and for other purposes.
Kent Waterworks Act 1902	2 Edw. 7. c. cxvii	22 July 1902
An Act for empowering the Kent Waterworks Company to raise further money to enable them to fulfil their statutory obligations relating to the supply of water to supply some places adjoining their district and to acquire additional lands and for other purposes.
South Wales Electrical Power Distribution Company Act 1902	2 Edw. 7. c. cxviii	22 July 1902
An Act to enable the South Wales Electrical Power Distribution Company to acquire additional lands and for other purposes.
West Ham Gas Act 1902	2 Edw. 7. c. cxix	22 July 1902
An Act to confer further powers on the West Ham Gas Company and for other purposes.
Ticehurst Water Act 1902	2 Edw. 7. c. cxx	22 July 1902
An Act to incorporate the Ticehurst and Robertsbridge Water Company and to enable them to supply with water the parish of Ticehurst and certain other parishes in the county of Sussex.
Newcastle-upon-Tyne Corporation Tramways Extensions Act 1902 (repealed)	2 Edw. 7. c. cxxi	22 July 1902
An Act to enable the Mayor Aldermen and Citizens of the City and County of Newcastle-upon-Tyne to construct additional tramways in and adjacent to the city and for other purposes. (Repealed by Newcastle-upon-Tyne Corporation (General Powers) Act 1935 (25 & 26 Geo. 5. c. cxxiv))
Knaresborough Improvement Act 1902	2 Edw. 7. c. cxxii	22 July 1902
An Act to make further provision with regard to the market water and gas undertakings of the Urban District Council of Knaresborough and for the improvement health and local government of the district.
North British Railway (Steam Vessels) Act 1902	2 Edw. 7. c. cxxiii	22 July 1902
An Act to authorise the North British Railway Company to provide and use steam vessels and for other purposes.
Halifax Corporation Act 1902	2 Edw. 7. c. cxxiv	22 July 1902
An Act to extend the boundaries of the county borough of Halifax and to empower the Corporation to construct additional tramways street widenings and improvements to confer further powers with respect to their sewerage waterworks and electricity undertakings and in regard to streets and buildings and for the health local government and improvement of the borough and for other purposes.
Buxton Urban District Council Water Act 1902	2 Edw. 7. c. cxxv	22 July 1902
An Act to empower the Urban District Council of Buxton to construct additional waterworks and to make further and better provision for the good government and health of the district and for other purposes.
Great Northern Railway (No. 2) Act 1902	2 Edw. 7. c. cxxvi	22 July 1902
An Act to empower the Great Northern Railway Company to construct an underground railway in Islington and to lease the same to the Great Northern and City Railway Company and for other purposes.
Kent Electric Power Act 1902	2 Edw. 7. c. cxxvii	22 July 1902
An Act for incorporating and conferring powers on the Kent Electric Power Company and for other purposes.
Lancashire and Yorkshire Railway (Steam Vessels) Act 1902	2 Edw. 7. c. cxxviii	22 July 1902
An Act to authorise the Lancashire and Yorkshire Railway Company to acquire the undertaking of the Drogheda Steam Packet Company Limited and to provide steam vessels to ply between the ports of Liverpool and Fleetwood and the port of Drogheda and for other purposes.
Leamington Corporation Act 1902 (repealed)	2 Edw. 7. c. cxxix	22 July 1902
An Act to make further and better provision in regard to the health local government and improvement of the borough of Royal Leamington Spa to repeal part of the Leamington Corporation Act 1896 (Note: Leamington Corporation Act 1896 (59 & 60 Vict. c. cxlii)) and for other purposes. (Repealed by Warwick District Council Act 1984 (c. xxiv))
Bristol Waterworks Act 1902	2 Edw. 7. c. cxxx	22 July 1902
An Act for the granting of further powers to the Bristol Waterworks Company and for other purposes.
Leicestershire and Warwickshire Electric Power Act 1902	2 Edw. 7. c. cxxxi	22 July 1902
An Act for incorporating and conferring powers on the Leicestershire and Warwickshire Electric Power Company.
Tyneside Tramways and Tramroads Act 1902	2 Edw. 7. c. cxxxii	22 July 1902
An Act to confer further powers upon the Tyneside Tramways and Tramroads Company for the construction of tramways and tramroads and for other purposes.
Chard Gas Act 1902	2 Edw. 7. c. cxxxiii	22 July 1902
An Act for incorporating and conferring powers on the Chard Gas Company.
Commercial Gas Act 1902	2 Edw. 7. c. cxxxiv	22 July 1902
An Act to convert the capital stocks and debenture stock of the Commercial Gas Company into stocks of other nominal amounts but yielding equivalent amounts of dividend or interest and to empower that Company to raise additional capital to amend the Acts relating to the Company and for other purposes.
Great Central Railway Act 1902	2 Edw. 7. c. cxxxv	22 July 1902
An Act to enable the Great Central Railway Company to make new railways and other works and to acquire additional lands to extend the time for the compulsory purchase of certain lands and for the completion of certain railways of the Company the Company and the Great Western Railway Company the North Wales and Liverpool Railway Committee the Liverpool St. Helens and South Lancashire Railway Company and for the sale of the superfluous lands of the Cheshire Lines Committee the Sheffield and Midland Railway Companies Committee and the Wigan Junction Railways Company to enable the Company to subscribe to the capital of the Humber Commercial Railway and Dock Company and for other purposes.
West Gloucestershire Water Act 1902	2 Edw. 7. c. cxxxvi	22 July 1902
An Act for extending the limits of supply of the West Gloucestershire Water Company and for authorising the Company to raise further capital and for other purposes.
Huddersfield Corporation Act 1902	2 Edw. 7. c. cxxxvii	22 July 1902
An Act to confer further powers upon the Mayor Aldermen and Burgesses of the county borough of Huddersfield with respect to waterworks and other matters to provide for the transfer of the Technical College and the Lock wood Mechanics' Institution to the Corporation and to make further provision for the health and good government of the borough and for other purposes.
Manchester Corporation (General Powers) Act 1902	2 Edw. 7. c. cxxxviii	22 July 1902
An Act to confer further powers upon the Lord Mayor Aldermen and Citizens of the City of Manchester with reference to the construction of railway and other works in connection with their electricity undertaking the widening of streets and the acquisition and appropriation of lands and with respect to new buildings regulation of street traffic and other matters affecting the health and good government of the city and for other purposes.
Imperial Institute (Transfer) Act 1902 (repealed)	2 Edw. 7. c. cxxxix	22 July 1902
An Act to provide for placing the Imperial Institute under the management of the Board of Trade and for other purposes. (Repealed by Imperial Institute Act 1925 (15 & 16 Geo. 5 c. xvii) and Commonwealth Institute Act 1958 (c. 16))
North British Railway (General Powers) Act 1902	2 Edw. 7. c. cxl	22 July 1902
An Act to provide for the transfer to the Company of the powers of the Corporation of Glasgow with reference to the Provan Branch Railway to further extend the time for the purchase of lands for the purposes and for the completion of the Kirkcaldy New Railways to extend the time for the sale of superfluous lands by the Company and the Forth Bridge Railway Company to confirm an Agreement with the Lauder Light Railway Company for the working by the Company of the Lauder Light Railway to provide for the conversion of the West Highland Railway Company's Stocks into Debenture Stock of the Company and for other purposes.
Nottingham and Retford Railway Act 1902	2 Edw. 7. c. cxli	22 July 1902
An Act to authorise the construction of railways between Nottingham and Retford and for other purposes.
Bristol Corporation Act 1902	2 Edw. 7. c. cxlii	31 July 1902
An Act to empower the Lord Mayor Aldermen and Burgesses of the City of Bristol to construct an additional dock railway and other works to extend the city and county of Bristol and for other purposes.
Medway and Thames Canal Act 1902	2 Edw. 7. c. cxliii	31 July 1902
An Act to incorporate a Company and to empower such Company to construct a canal from the River Medway to the River Thames and for other purposes.
Barry Railway Act 1902	2 Edw. 7. c. cxliv	31 July 1902
An Act to extend the time for the completion of certain railways of and for the purchase of certain lands by the Barry Railway Company and for other purposes.
Central London Railway Act 1902	2 Edw. 7. c. cxlv	31 July 1902
An Act to empower the Central London Railway Company to acquire additional lands and for other purposes.
Caledonian Railway Act 1902	2 Edw. 7. c. cxlvi	31 July 1902
An Act to confer further powers on the Caledonian Railway Company in relation to their undertaking to authorise certain alterations or deviations of the Callander and Oban and Lochearnhead St. Fillans and Comrie Railways at or near Lochearnhead Station to provide for the transfer to the Caledonian Railway Company of the undertakings of the Lochearnhead St. Fillans and Comrie and the Paisley and Barrhead District Railway Companies to revive and extend the powers for the purchase of lands and completion of works by the Caledonian and other railway companies and for other purposes.
Omagh Urban District Gas Act 1902	2 Edw. 7. c. cxlvii	31 July 1902
An Act to provide for the transfer of the undertaking of the Omagh Gas Company to the Omagh Urban District Council and to authorise that Council to supply gas and for other purposes.
Salford Corporation Act 1902	2 Edw. 7. c. cxlviii	31 July 1902
An Act to enable the Mayor Aldermen and Burgesses of the borough of Salford to construct additional tramways to make provision with respect to the interchange of through traffic between the said borough and the city of Manchester to make street improvements and to raise additional moneys by mortgage and by the creation and issue of stock and to make further provisions for the good government of the borough and for other purposes.
Southport and Lytham Tramroad Act 1902	2 Edw. 7. c. cxlix	31 July 1902
An Act for extending the time limited for the acquisition of land and completion of works under the Southport District Tramroad Act 1899 and the Southport and Lytham Tramroad Act 1900 (Note: Southport and Lytham Tramroad Act 1900 (63 & 64 Vict. c. cclxxx)) for authorising the issue of preferred and deferred half shares and for other purposes.
Great Central and Midland Railway (Railways in South Yorkshire) Act 1902	2 Edw. 7. c. cl	31 July 1902
An Act for transferring to the Great Central and Midland Railway Companies the powers of the Shireoaks Laughton and Maltby Railway Company and for authorising the construction of railways and works by the Great Central and Midland Railway Companies and for other purposes.
Midland Railway Act 1902	2 Edw. 7. c. cli	31 July 1902
An Act to confer additional powers upon the Midland Railway Company and upon the Midland and Great Northern Railways Joint Committee and upon the Norfolk and Suffolk Joint Railways Committee for the construction of works and the acquisition of lands to authorise agreements between the Midland Railway Company and the Midland and South Western Junction Railway Company to provide for the vesting of the Tottenham and Hampstead Junction Railway in the Midland and Great Eastern Railway Companies and for other purposes.
Midland Railway (Steam Vessels) Act 1902	2 Edw. 7. c. clii	31 July 1902
An Act for empowering the Midland Railway Company to provide and use steam vessels and for other purposes.
Norwich Corporation (Electricity, &c.) Act 1902 (repealed)	2 Edw. 7. c. cliii	31 July 1902
An Act to authorise the transfer of the undertaking of the Norwich Electricity Company Limited to the Corporation of Norwich and for other purposes. (Repealed by Norwich City Council Act 1984 (c. xxiii))
Cleethorpes Improvement Act 1902 (repealed)	2 Edw. 7. c. cliv	31 July 1902
An Act to authorise the Urban District Council of Cleethorpes-with-Thrunscoe in the county of Lincoln to construct a sea-wall and other works to construct and work tramways to purchase certain lands for the purposes of recreation grounds and to make further provision in regard to the supply of electricity and for the improvement health local government and finance of the district and for other purposes. (Repealed by Humberside Act 1982 (c.iii))
East Worcestershire Water Act 1902	2 Edw. 7. c. clv	31 July 1902
An Act to extend the limits of supply of the East Worcestershire Waterworks Company and to confer further powers upon that Company.
North Metropolitan Electric Power Supply Act 1902 (repealed)	2 Edw. 7. c. clvi	31 July 1902
An Act for conferring further powers upon the North Metropolitan Electric Power Supply Company and for other purposes. (Repealed by North Metropolitan Electric Power Supply (Consolidation) Act 1928 (18 & 19 Geo. 5. c. cxviii))
Brynmawr and Western Valleys Railway (Vesting) Act 1902	2 Edw. 7. c. clvii	31 July 1902
An Act for vesting in the Great Western and London and North Western Railway Companies the powers of the Brynmawr and Western Valleys Railway Company for extending the time for the completion of the authorised railways of that Company and for other purposes.
Lancashire and Yorkshire Railway (Various Powers) Act 1902	2 Edw. 7. c. clviii	31 July 1902
An Act for conferring further powers on the Lancashire and Yorkshire Railway Company.
Hastings Tramways (Extension of Time) Act 1902 (repealed)	2 Edw. 7. c. clix	31 July 1902
An Act to extend the periods for taking lands for and for the construction and completion of the light railway and tramways transferred by and authorised by the Hastings Tramways Act 1900 (Note: Hastings Tramways Act 1900 (63 & 64 Vict. c. cxl)) and for other purposes. (Repealed by Hastings Tramways Act 1957 (5 & 6 Eliz. 2. c. xxxvi))
Taff Vale Railway Act 1902	2 Edw. 7. c. clx	31 July 1902
An Act for vesting in the Taff Vale Railway Company the undertaking of the Aberdare Railway Company and for other purposes.
Consett Waterworks Act 1902	2 Edw. 7. c. clxi	31 July 1902
An Act to confer further powers on the Consett Waterworks Company and for other purposes.
Rhondda Urban District Council (Tramways, &c.) Act 1902 (repealed)	2 Edw. 7. c. clxii	31 July 1902
An Act to authorise the Rhondda Urban District Council in the county of Glamorgan to construct and work tramways to make a new road street widenings and improvements to make additional waterworks to confer upon the Council further powers with respect to their water and gas undertakings to borrow additional moneys and for other purposes. (Repealed by Rhondda Corporation Act 1973 (c. xxiii))
Felixstowe and Walton Improvement Act 1902	2 Edw. 7. c. clxiii	31 July 1902
An Act to authorise the Urban District Council of Felixstowe and Walton in the county of Suffolk to construct a sea wall and other works to purchase Hamilton Terrace Cliffs and certain other lands and to make further and better provision for the improvement health local government and finance of the district and for other purposes.
London County Council (Money) Act 1902 (repealed)	2 Edw. 7. c. clxiv	31 July 1902
An Act to regulate the expenditure of money by the London County Council on capital account during the current financial period and the raising of money to meet such expenditure. (Repealed by London County Council (Finance Consolidation) Act 1912 (2 & 3 Geo. 5. c. cv))
City of London (Spitalfields Market) Act 1902	2 Edw. 7. c. clxv	31 July 1902
An Act to empower the Corporation of the City of London to acquire Spitalfields Market with power to extend and improve the same and to maintain the said market or sell or lease the same and for other purposes in reference thereto.
West Ham Corporation Act 1902	2 Edw. 7. c. clxvi	31 July 1902
An Act to confer further powers upon the Mayor Aldermen and Burgesses of the county borough of West Ham and to make further provision for the good government of that borough and for other purposes.
Newport (Monmouthshire) Corporation Act 1902	2 Edw. 7. c. clxvii	31 July 1902
An Act to confer further powers upon the Mayor Aldermen and Burgesses of the borough of Newport for the construction of tramways and other works and for other purposes.
North Eastern Railway Act 1902	2 Edw. 7. c. clxviii	31 July 1902
An Act. to confer additional powers upon the North Eastern Railway Company and upon that Company jointly with the Lancashire and Yorkshire Railway Company for the construction of new railways and other works and the acquisition of lands and jointly with the Midland and Lancashire and Yorkshire Railway Companies in respect of their Normanton Station and for vesting in the Company and the Lancashire and Yorkshire Railway Company the Goole and Marshland Light Railway and the Isle of Axholme Light Railway and for other purposes.
London and North Western Railway Act 1902	2 Edw. 7. c. clxix	31 July 1902
An Act for empowering the London and North Western Railway Company to construct additional dock works at Garston and for conferring further powers upon that Company in relation to their own undertaking and upon that Company and the Great Western Railway Company in relation to their joint undertaking and upon the Shropshire Union Railways and Canal Company in relation to their undertaking and for other purposes.
North Metropolitan Tramways Act 1902	2 Edw. 7. c. clxx	31 July 1902
An Act to authorise the use of electrical power upon the tramways of the North Metropolitan Tramways Company in the county of Middlesex and for other purposes.
Croydon and District Electric Tramways Act 1902	2 Edw. 7. c. clxxi	31 July 1902
An Act to authorise the British Electric Traction Company Limited to construct tramways in the counties of Surrey and Kent and for other purposes.
Metropolitan Railway Act 1902	2 Edw. 7. c. clxxii	31 July 1902
An Act to authorise the Metropolitan Railway Company to execute further works and to acquire additional lands for the enlargement and improvement of the Baker Street Station to acquire other lands for generating electricity for the electrical working of their undertaking and undertakings in which they are jointly interested with other, companies and for other purposes.
London County Council (General Powers) Act 1902	2 Edw. 7. c. clxxiii	31 July 1902
An Act to empower the London County Council to purchase lands for various purposes to extend the time for completion of certain works and acquisition of lands to empower the Metropolitan Borough Councils of Camberwell and Fulham to purchase lands and to confer further powers with respect to common lodging-houses and other sanitary matters and for other purposes.
Weardale Water Act 1902	2 Edw. 7. c. clxxiv	31 July 1902
An Act to empower the Weardale and Shildon District Waterworks Company to acquire the undertaking of the Consett Waterworks Company to construct additional works and to raise additional capital and for other purposes.
Colwyn Bay and Colwyn Urban District Council Act 1902	2 Edw. 7. c. clxxv	31 July 1902
An Act to authorise the Urban District Council of Colwyn Bay and Colwyn to construct promenades and sewerage and sewage outfall works and other works and to make further provision in regard to the health local government improvement and finance of their district and for other purposes.
Finchley Urban District Council Act 1902 (repealed)	2 Edw. 7. c. clxxvi	31 July 1902
An Act to authorise the Urban District Council of Finchley to construct street improvements and for other purposes. (Repealed by Local Law (North West London Boroughs) Order 1965 (SI 1965/533))
Leicester Corporation Act 1902	2 Edw. 7. c. clxxvii	31 July 1902
An Act to enable the Mayor Aldermen and Burgesses of the borough of Leicester to construct additional tramways and street improvements in the borough and to construct additional gasworks and for other purposes.
North and South Shields Electric Railway Act 1902	2 Edw. 7. c. clxxviii	31 July 1902
An Act for incorporating and conferring powers upon the North and South Shields Electric Railway Company and for other purposes.
Wrexham District Tramways (Extension) Act 1902	2 Edw. 7. c. clxxix	31 July 1902
An Act for empowering the Wrexham and District Electric Tramways Limited to construct new tramways and other works and to work the said tramways by electrical power and for other purposes.
Cavehill and Whitewell Tramways Act 1902	2 Edw. 7. c. clxxx	31 July 1902
An Act for empowering the Cavehill and Whitewell Tramway Company to work their tramways by electrical power and to raise additional capital and for other purposes.
London, Tilbury and Southend Railway Act 1902	2 Edw. 7. c. clxxxi	31 July 1902
An Act to confer further powers upon the London Tilbury and Southend Railway Company and for other purposes.
Whitechapel and Bow Railway Act 1902	2 Edw. 7. c. clxxxii	31 July 1902
An Act to confer further powers on the Whitechapel and Bow Railway Company and for other purposes.
Clay Cross Railway Act 1902 (repealed)	2 Edw. 7. c. clxxxiii	31 July 1902
An Act for making a railway in the county of Derby connecting the Clay Cross collieries and works and other works with the Lancashire Derbyshire and East Coast Railway near Chesterfield and for other purposes. (Repealed by Statute Law (Repeals) Act 2013 (c. 2))
Aberdeen Accountants Order Confirmation Act 1902 (repealed)	2 Edw. 7. c. clxxxiv	31 July 1902
An Act to confirm a Provisional Order under the Private Legislation Procedure (Scotland) Act 1899 relating to the Society of Accountants in Aberdeen. (Repealed by Statute Law (Repeals) Act 1986 (c. 12))
Glasgow Corporation (Gas, &c.) Order Confirmation Act 1902	2 Edw. 7. c. clxxxv	31 July 1902
An Act to confirm a Provisional Order under the Private Legislation Procedure (Scotland) Act 1899 relating to Glasgow Corporation (Gas, &c.).
	Glasgow Corporation (Gas, &c.) Order 1902	
Electric Lighting Orders Confirmation (No. 5) Act 1902 (repealed)	2 Edw. 7. c. clxxxvi	31 July 1902
An Act to confirm certain Provisional Orders made by the Board of Trade under the Electric Lighting Acts 1882 and 1888 and the Electric Lighting (Scotland) Act 1890 relating to Carnoustie Dumbarton Glasgow (Kinning Park) Govan (Extension) Nairn and St. Andrews. (Repealed by North of Scotland Electricity Order Confirmation Act 1958 (7 & 8 Eliz. 2. c. ii))
Electric Lighting Orders Confirmation (No. 6) Act 1902	2 Edw. 7. c. clxxxvii	31 July 1902
An Act to confirm certain Provisional Orders granted by the Board of Trade under the Electric Lighting Acts 1882 and 1888 relating to Ardsley East and West Barton Regis Blaydon Chester-le-Street Church Stretton Lees Lower Bebington Newburn Seghill Earsdon and Tynemouth (Rural) and Stanley (Yorkshire).
	Ardsley East and West Electric Lighting Order 1902	
	Barton Regis Electric Lighting Order 1902	
	Blaydon Electric Lighting Order 1902	
	Chester-le-Street Electric Lighting Order 1902	
	Church Stretton Electric Lighting Order 1902	
	Lees Electric Lighting Order 1902	
	Lower Bebington Electric Lighting Order 1902	
	Newburn Electric Lighting Order 1902	
	Seghill, Earsdon and Tynemouth (Rural) Electric Lighting Order 1902	
	Stanley (Yorkshire) Electric Lighting Order 1902	
Gas Orders Confirmation (No. 2) Act 1902	2 Edw. 7. c. clxxxviii	31 July 1902
An Act to confirm certain Provisional Orders made by the Board of Trade under the Gas and Water Works Facilities Act 1870 relating to Bridge-of-Earn Gas Clay Cross Gas Harwich Gas and Homsey Gas.
	Bridge-of-Earn Gas Order 1902	
	Clay Cross Gas Order 1902	
	Harwich Gas Order 1902	
	Hornsey Gas Order 1902	
Water Orders Confirmation Act 1902	2 Edw. 7. c. clxxxix	31 July 1902
An Act to confirm certain Provisional Orders made by the Board of Trade under the Gas and Water Works Facilities Act 1870 relating to Beccles Water Burnham and District Water Croft (Leicestershire) Water Borough of Portsmouth Water and Woodford Halse Water.
	Beccles Waterworks Order 1902	
	Burnham and District Water Order 1902	
	Croft (Leicestershire) Water Order 1902	
	Borough of Portsmouth Water Order 1902	
	Woodford Halse Water Order 1902	
Land Drainage Provisional Order Confirmation Act 1902	2 Edw. 7. c. cxc	31 July 1902
An Act to confirm a Provisional Order under the Land Drainage Act 1861 (Note: Land Drainage Act 1861 (24 & 25 Vict. c. 133)) relating to Bourne South Fen and Bourne South Fen Pastures in the parish of Bourne in the county of Lincoln.
	Bourne South Fen Drainage Order 1902	
Local Government Board's Provisional Orders Confirmation (No. 4) Act 1902	2 Edw. 7. c. cxci	31 July 1902
An Act to confirm certain Provisional Orders of the Local Government Board relating to Carlisle (Rural) Folkestone Harrogate Liversedge Sheffield and Weetslade.
	Carlisle Rural Order 1902	
	Folkestone Order 1902	
	Harrogate Order 1902	
	Liversedge Order 1902	
	Sheffield Order (No. 1) 1902	
	Weetslade Order 1902	
Local Government Board's Provisional Orders Confirmation (No. 6) Act 1902 (repealed)	2 Edw. 7. c. cxcii	31 July 1902
An Act to confirm certain Provisional Orders of the Local Government Board relating to the Metropolitan Boroughs of Bethnal Green Stoke Newington and Woolwich. (Repealed by Local Law (Greater London Council and Inner London Boroughs) Order 1965 (SI 1965/540))
Local Government Board's Provisional Orders Confirmation (No. 10) Act 1902	2 Edw. 7. c. cxciii	31 July 1902
An Act to confirm certain Provisional Orders of the Local Government Board relating to Croydon Hindley and Oswestry.
	Croydon Order 1902	
	Hindley Order 1902	
	Oswestry Order 1902	
Post Office (Sites) Act 1902 (repealed)	2 Edw. 7. c. cxciv	31 July 1902
An Act to enable His Majesty's Postmaster-General to acquire lands in the county of London for the public service and for other purposes. (Repealed by Postal Services Act 2000 (Consequential Modifications to Local Enactments) Order 2003 (SI 2003/1542))
Pier and Harbour Order Confirmation (No. 4) Act 1902	2 Edw. 7. c. cxcv	31 July 1902
An Act to confirm a Provisional Order made by the Board of Trade under the General Pier and Harbour Act 1861 relating to Watchet.
	Watchet Order 1902	
Education Board Provisional Orders Confirmation (Barnes, &c.) Act 1902	2 Edw. 7. c. cxcvi	31 July 1902
An Act to confirm certain Provisional Orders made by the Board of Education under the Elementary Education Acts 1870 to 1900 to enable the School Boards for Barnes Epping Liverpool Manchester and Swansea United District to put in force the Lands Clauses Acts.
	Barnes (Surrey) School Board Order 1902	
	Epping School Board Order 1902	
	Liverpool School Board Order 1902	
	Manchester School Board Order 1902	
	Swansea School Board Order 1902	
Aberdeen Suburban Tramways Order Confirmation Act 1902	2 Edw. 7. c. cxcvii	31 July 1902
An Act to confirm a Provisional Order under the Private Legislation Procedure (Scotland) Act 1899 relating to Aberdeen Suburban Tramways.
	Aberdeen Suburban Tramways Order 1902	
New Forest (Sale of Lands for Public Purposes) Act 1902 (repealed)	2 Edw. 7. c. cxcviii	31 July 1902
An Act for enabling the Commissioners of Woods to sell or let land in the New Forest for necessary public purposes. (Repealed by Wild Creatures and Forest Laws Act 1971 (c. 47))
Commons Regulation (Sodbury) Provisional Order Act 1902	2 Edw. 7. c. cxcix	31 July 1902
An Act to confirm a Provisional Order under the Inclosure Acts 1845 to 1882 for the regulation of the commons in the parishes of Chipping Sodbury Old Sodbury and Little Sodbury in the county of Gloucester.
	Sodbury Commons Order 1902	
Pier and Harbour Orders Confirmation (No. 1) Act 1902	2 Edw. 7. c. cc	8 August 1902
An Act to confirm certain Provisional Orders made by the Board of Trade under the General Pier and Harbour Act 1861 relating to Wexford and Wicklow.
	Wexford Harbour Order 1902	
	Wicklow Harbour Order 1902	
Pier and Harbour Orders Confirmation (No. 3) Act 1902	2 Edw. 7. c. cci	8 August 1902
An Act to confirm certain Provisional Orders made by the Board of Trade under the General Pier and Harbour Act 1861 relating to Chatham Falmouth Harrington St. Anne's-on-the-Sea and Tenby.
	Chatham Sun Pier Order 1902	
	Falmouth Corporation Quays Order 1902	
	Harrington Harbour Order 1902	
	St. Anna's-on-the-Sea Pier Order 1902	
	Tenby Pier and Landing Stage Order 1902	
Tramways Orders Confirmation (No. 1) Act 1902	2 Edw. 7. c. ccii	8 August 1902
An Act to confirm certain Provisional Orders made by the Board of Trade under the Tramways Act 1870 relating to Brighton Corporation Tramways Cheadle and Gatley Urban District Council Tramway Lees Urban District Council Tramways Southport Corporation Tramways Stockport Corporation Tramways and Sunderland Corporation Tramways.
	Brighton Corporation Tramways Order 1902	
	Cheadle and Gatley Urban District Council Tramways Order 1902	
	Lees Urban District Council Tramways Order 1902	
	Southport Corporation Tramways Order 1902	
	Stockport Corporation Tramways Order 1902	
	Sunderland Corporation Tramways Order 1902	
Tramways Orders Confirmation (No. 2) Act 1902	2 Edw. 7. c. cciii	8 August 1902
An Act to confirm certain Provisional Orders made by the Board of Trade under the Tramways Act 1870 relating to Heywood Corporation Tramways Leeds Corporation Tramways Pontypridd Urban District Council Tramways Southampton Corporation Tramways West Riding Tramways (Knottingley Extension) and Wolverhampton Corporation Tramways.
	Heywood Corporation Tramways Order 1902	
	Leeds Corporation Tramways Order 1902	
	Pontypridd Urban District Council Tramways Order 1902	
	Southampton Corporation Tramways Order 1902	
	West Riding Tramways (Knottingley Extension) Order 1902	
	Wolverhampton Corporation Tramways Order 1902	
Portpatrick and Wigtownshire Joint Railway Order Confirmation Act 1902	2 Edw. 7. c. cciv	8 August 1902
An Act to confirm a Provisional Order under the Private Legislation Procedure (Scotland) Act 1899 relating to the Portpatrick and Wigtownshire Joint Railway.
	Portpatrick and Wigtownshire Joint Railway Order 1902	
Glasgow and South Western Railway Order Confirmation Act 1902	2 Edw. 7. c. ccv	8 August 1902
An Act to confirm a Provisional Order under the Private Legislation Procedure (Scotland) Act 1899 relating to the Glasgow and South Western Railway.
	Glasgow and South Western Railway Order 1902	
Electric Lighting Orders Confirmation (No. 7) Act 1902	2 Edw. 7. c. ccvi	8 August 1902
An Act to confirm certain Provisional Orders made by the Board of Trade under the Electric Lighting Acts 1882 and 1888 relating to Bedlingtonshire Chepstow (Urban and Rural) Cowes Hitchin Morpeth Ashington Newbiggin-by-the-Sea and Morpeth (Rural) Pokesdown Slough and Datchet Stevenage Tadcaster and District Trefriw and certain districts and parishes in the West Riding of the county of York.
	Bedlingtonshire Electric Lighting Order 1902	
	Chepstow Electric Lighting and Power Order 1902	
	Cowes Electric Lighting Order 1902	
	Hitchin Electric Lighting Order 1902	
	Morpeth, Ashington and Newbiggin-by-the-Sea Electric Lighting Order 1902	
	Pokesdown Electric Lighting Order 1902	
	Slough Electric Lighting Order 1902	
	Stevenage Electric Lighting Order 1902	
	Tadcaster and Dist. Electric Lighting Order 1902	
	Trefriw Electric Lighting Order 1902	
	West Riding Electric Lighting Order 1902	
Electric Lighting Orders Confirmation (No. 8) Act 1902	2 Edw. 7. c. ccvii	8 August 1902
An Act to confirm certain Provisional Orders made by the Board of Trade under the Electric Lighting Acts 1882 and 1888 relating to Bermondsey (Extension) Stoke Newington and Woolwich.
	Bermondsey Electric Lighting Order 1902	
	Stoke Newington Electric Lighting Order 1902	
	Woolwich Electric Lighting Order 1902	
Gas and Water Orders Confirmation (No. 2) Act 1902	2 Edw. 7. c. ccviii	8 August 1902
An Act to confirm certain Provisional Orders made by the Board of Trade under the Gas and Water Works Facilities Act 1870 relating to Knutsford Gas and Water Staines and Egham Gas Syston and Thurmaston Gas Uckfield Water and Worksop Water.
	Knutsford Gas and Water Order 1902	
	Staines and Egham Gas Order 1902	
	Syston and Thurmaston Gas Order 1902	
	Uckfield Water Order 1902	
	Worksop Waterworks Order 1902	
Local Government Board's Provisional Orders Confirmation (No. 7) Act 1902	2 Edw. 7. c. ccix	8 August 1902
An Act to confirm certain Provisional Orders of the Local Government Board relating to Arundel Liverpool and Worthing and the counties of Cornwall Dorset and the West Riding of Yorkshire.
	Arundel (Extension) Order 1902	
	Liverpool (Extension) Order 1902	
	Worthing (Extension) Order 1902	
	County of Cornwall Order 1902	
	County of Dorset Order 1902	
	County of the West Riding of Yorkshire Order 1902	
Local Government Board's Provisional Orders Confirmation (No. 12) Act 1902	2 Edw. 7. c. ccx	8 August 1902
An Act to confirm certain Provisional Orders of the Local Government Board relating to Rotherham and West Hartlepool.
	Borough of Rotherham Order 1902	
	Borough of West Hartlepool Order 1902	
Education Board Provisional Order Confirmation (London) Act 1902	2 Edw. 7. c. ccxi	8 August 1902
An Act to confirm a Provisional Order made by the Board of Education under the Elementary Education Acts 1870 to 1900 to enable the School Board for London to put in force the Lands Clauses Acts.
	Provisional Order for putting in force the Lands Clauses Acts.	
Greenock and Port Glasgow Tramways (Extension) Order Confirmation Act 1902	2 Edw. 7. c. ccxii	8 August 1902
An Act to confirm a Provisional Order under the Private Legislation Procedure (Scotland) Act 1899 relating to Greenock and Port Glasgow Tramways.
	Greenock and Port Glasgow Tramways (Extension) Order 1902	
Edinburgh and Leith Corporations Gas Order Confirmation Act 1902 (repealed)	2 Edw. 7. c. ccxiii	8 August 1902
An Act to confirm a Provisional Order under the Private Legislation Procedure (Scotland) Act 1899 relating to Edinburgh and Leith Corporations Gas. (Repealed by Edinburgh Corporation Order Confirmation Act 1932 (22 & 23 Geo. 5. c. vii))
Yardley Charity Estates Scheme Confirmation Act 1902	2 Edw. 7. c. ccxiv	8 August 1902
An Act to confirm a Scheme of the Charity Commissioners for the management of the Charity or Foundation called the Yardley Charity Estates in the parish of Yardley in the county of Worcester.
	Yardley Charity Estates Scheme.	
Rossendale Valley Tramways Act 1902 (repealed)	2 Edw. 7. c. ccxv	8 August 1902
An Act to authorise the Rossendale Valley Tramways Company to extend their tramways and for other purposes. (Repealed by County of Lancashire Act 1984 (c. xxi))
Liverpool Tramways and Electric Supply (Garston Transfer) Act 1902 (repealed)	2 Edw. 7. c. ccxvi	8 August 1902
An Act to confirm an agreement between the Garston and District Tramways Company Limited of the first part the Garston and District Electric Supply Company Limited of the second part and the Corporation of the City of Liverpool of the third part for the transfer to the Corporation of the respective undertakings of those companies and for other purposes. (Repealed by Liverpool Corporation Act 1921 (11 & 12 Geo. 5. c. lxxiv))
Hull, Barnsley and West Riding Junction Railway and Dock (South Yorkshire Extension Lines) Act 1902	2 Edw. 7. c. ccxvii	8 August 1902
An Act to authorise the Hull Barnsley and West Riding Junction Railway and Dock Company to construct new railways and to purchase additional lands and to confer other powers upon them and for other purposes.
London County Council (Subways and Tramways) Act 1902	2 Edw. 7. c. ccxviii	8 August 1902
An Act to empower the London County Council to construct and use a subway and tramway in the Metropolitan Borough of Holborn and the City of Westminster and for other purposes.
London County Council (Tramways and Improvements) Act 1902	2 Edw. 7. c. ccxix	8 August 1902
An Act to enable the London County Council to construct new tramways in the county of London and to work the same by electric traction to make street improvements to acquire lands for a station for generating electricity and for use in connexion with their tramway undertaking and for other purposes.
Metropolitan District Railway Act 1902	2 Edw. 7. c. ccxx	8 August 1902
An Act to empower the Metropolitan District Railway Company to lay down and maintain mains for electrical energy to acquire lands to work certain railways by electrical energy to raise further capital to enable them to constitute the railway authorised by the Metropolitan District Railway Act 1897 (Note: Metropolitan District Railway Act 1897 (60 & 61 Vict. c. ccxlvii)) a separate undertaking to extend the time for the completion of certain railways and compulsory purchase of lands and for other purposes.
Hastings Harbour District Railway (Extension of Time) Act 1902 (repealed)	2 Edw. 7. c. ccxxi	8 August 1902
An Act for reviving and extending the period limited by the Hastings Harbour District Railway Act 1897 (Note: Hastings Harbour District Railway Act 1897 (60 & 61 Vict. c. ccii)) for the compulsory purchase of lands and for extending the period limited by that Act for the construction of the railways and works by that Act authorised. (Repealed by Hastings Harbour District Railway (Abandonment) Act 1905 (5 Edw. 7. c. xxiv))
Great Northern and City Railway Act 1902	2 Edw. 7. c. ccxxii	8 August 1902
An Act to confer further powers on the Great Northern and City Railway Company and to extend the time for the completion of the authorised railway of that Company and for other purposes.
Birmingham and Midland Tramways Act 1902	2 Edw. 7. c. ccxxiii	8 August 1902
An Act for authorising the Birmingham and Midland Tramways Limited to construct additional tramways and other works and to use mechanical power upon their tramways and for other purposes.
Devonport Corporation (General Powers) Act 1902	2 Edw. 7. c. ccxxiv	8 August 1902
An Act to confer powers upon the Corporation of the borough of Devonport with respect to the construction and working of tramways within the borough to authorise the construction of an embankment and road at Camel's Head Bridge to make further provision for the borrowing of money and for other purposes.
Devonport Corporation (Water) Act 1902	2 Edw. 7. c. ccxxv	8 August 1902
An Act to authorise the Mayor Aldermen and Burgesses of the borough of Devonport to purchase the undertaking of the Devonport Water Company and for other purposes.
Saddleworth and Springhead Tramways Act 1902	2 Edw. 7. c. ccxxvi	8 August 1902
An Act to incorporate the Saddleworth and Springhead Tramways Company and to empower that Company to make and maintain tramways and other works and for other purposes.
Ystradfellte Water Act 1902	2 Edw. 7. c. ccxxvii	8 August 1902
An Act to empower the Neath Rural District Council to obtain a supply of water from the Biver Tringarth in the parish of Ystradfellte in the county of Brecknock to acquire the Cwm Avon gas and water undertaking and for other purposes.
Wigan Corporation Act 1902	2 Edw. 7. c. ccxxviii	8 August 1902
An Act to confer further powers upon the Mayor Aldermen and Burgesses of the borough of Wigan in regard to the acquisition and construction of tramways and light railways and the construction of street improvements and to make further provision in regard to the health local government and improvement of the said borough and for other purposes.
North Staffordshire Tramways Act 1902	2 Edw. 7. c. ccxxix	8 August 1902
An Act for empowering the North Staffordshire Tramways Company Limited to work their tramways by mechanical or electrical power and for conferring further powers upon that Company and the Potteries Electric Traction Company Limited with regard to their respective tramways and for other purposes.
Mexborough and Swinton Tramways Act 1902	2 Edw. 7. c. ccxxx	8 August 1902
An Act to incorporate the Mexborough and Swinton Tramways Company and to empower that Company to make and maintain tramways and other works and for other purposes.
Liverpool Cathedral Act 1902	2 Edw. 7. c. ccxxxi	8 August 1902
An Act to authorise the Liverpool Cathedral Committee to purchase a site for and to erect a cathedral church for the diocese of Liverpool and for other purposes.
Swansea Corporation Act 1902	2 Edw. 7. c. ccxxxii	8 August 1902
An Act to empower the Corporation of Swansea to construct and work tramways and to construct street improvements and other works to inclose the common lands known as Graig-Trewyddfa to confer powers upon the Corporation in regard to their electric lighting undertaking their recreation grounds and the establishment of a workmen's compensation fund to provide for the discontinuance of payments to the twelve senior burgesses and to make further provision in regard to the health local government and improvement of the borough and the borrowing of money by the Corporation and for other purposes.
Nottingham Corporation Act 1902	2 Edw. 7. c. ccxxxiii	8 August 1902
An Act to empower the Corporation of Nottingham to construct additional tramways and to make new waterworks and for other purposes.
Margate Corporation (Water) Act 1902	2 Edw. 7. c. ccxxxiv	8 August 1902
An Act to empower the corporation of Margate to construct additional waterworks and to extend their limits for the supply of water and for other purposes.
Great Northern and Strand Railway Act 1902	2 Edw. 7. c. ccxxxv	8 August 1902
An Act to authorise the alteration of the railways of the Great Northern and Strand Railway Company and the transfer of their undertaking and powers to the Brompton and Piccadilly Circus Railway Company and for other purposes.
Dover Harbour Act 1902 (repealed)	2 Edw. 7. c. ccxxxvi	8 August 1902
An Act to authorise the construction of certain new works for improving the harbour of Dover the raising of further moneys by the Dover Harbour Board and for other purposes. (Repealed by Dover Harbour Act 1953 (1 & 2 Eliz. 2. c. xxix))
Barrow Hæmatite Steel Company Act 1902	2 Edw. 7. c. ccxxxvii	8 August 1902
An Act to provide for the settlement of questions which have arisen between the preference shareholders and the ordinary shareholders in the Barrow Hæmatite Steel Company Limited and for other purposes.
Menai Bridge Urban District Act 1902	2 Edw. 7. c. ccxxxviii	8 August 1902
An Act to authorise the Urban District Council of Menai Bridge to construct additional waterworks for the supply of their district to purchase and improve St. George's Pier to construct a sea wall and promenade and to make further, and better provision, for the improvement of the district and for other purposes.
Whitstable Water and Improvement Act 1902	2 Edw. 7. c. ccxxxix	8 August 1902
An Act to authorise the Urban District Council of Whitstable in the county of Kent to purchase the undertakings of the Whitstable Water Company Limited and the Whitstable Gas and Coke Company Limited and to supply water and gas to transfer to the Council the powers within the district of the Commissioners of Sewers for the levels of East Kent and to make further and better provision for the improvement health local government and finance of the district and for other purposes.
Liverpool Corporation Act 1902	2 Edw. 7. c. ccxl	8 August 1902
An Act for authorising the Corporation of the City of Liverpool to execute certain street improvements and to acquire certain lands for the protection of their Rivington water supply for confirming an agreement between the Corporation and the Mersey Docks and Harbour Board for making further regulations with respect to streets and buildings and with respect to sanitary matters for conferring on the Corporation powers with respect to Stanley Cattle Market for amending divers provisions of the Local Acts in force within the city and for other purposes.
York Corporation Act 1902	2 Edw. 7. c. ccxli	8 August 1902
An Act to confer further powers upon the Lord Mayor Aldermen and Citizens of the City of York and to make further provision in regard to the navigation of the Rivers Ouse and Foss and the health local government and improvement of the city and for other purposes.
Great Western Railway (Crumlin Viaduct) Act 1902	2 Edw. 7. c. ccxlii	8 August 1902
An Act to make provision for the protection of the Crumlin Viaduct on the Great Western Railway and for other purposes.
London and India Docks Company (Various Powers) Act 1902	2 Edw. 7. c. ccxliii	8 August 1902
An Act to empower the London and India Docks Company to acquire further lands to make further provision with respect to craft resorting to their docks to confer further powers, upon and to amend the Acts relating to the Company and for other purposes.
Dublin Port and Docks Act 1902	2 Edw. 7. c. ccxliv	8 August 1902
An Act to enable the Dublin Port and Docks Board to make new provisions with respect to the lists of electors of elective members of the Board to acquire lands for widening quays to provide quay traffic facilities to erect labouring class dwellings to borrow further moneys for the improvement of the port to substitute new mortgages for those created under the Dublin Port and Docks Acts of 1869 (Note: Dublin Port and Docks Act 1869 (32 & 33 Vict. c. c)) and 1879 (Note: Dublin Port and Docks Act 1879 (42 & 43 Vict. c. clxx)) to authorise additional and substituted rates to confer further powers upon the Board and to vary their existing Acts and for other purposes.
Eastbourne Corporation Act 1902	2 Edw. 7. c. ccxlv	8 August 1902
An Act to make further and better provision for the improvement health and good government of the borough of Eastbourne and for other purposes.
Fleetwood Urban District Council Act 1902	2 Edw. 7. c. ccxlvi	8 August 1902
An Act to empower the Urban District Council of Fleetwood in the county of Lancaster to construct new outfall and other sewers and for other purposes.
London United Tramways Act 1902	2 Edw. 7. c. ccxlvii	8 August 1902
An Act for conferring further powers on the London United Tramways (1901) Limited for constructing tramways and widening and altering roads in the counties of London and Surrey and for other purposes.
Gas and Water Orders Confirmation (No. 1) Act 1902	2 Edw. 7. c. ccxlviii	18 November 1902
An Act to confirm certain Provisional Orders made by the Board of Trade under the Gas and Water Works Facilities Act 1870 relating to Bridgend (Glamorganshire) Gas and Water Goring and Streatley District Gas and Water Marlow Water Mid-Kent Water and Pinxton Water.
	Bridgend (Glamorganshire) Gas and Water Order 1902 Order empowering the Bridgend (Glamorganshire) Gas and Water Company to raise additional Capital.	
	Goring and Streatley District Gas and Water Order 1902 Order empowering the Goring and Streatley Gas and Water Company Limited to raise additional Capital for the purposes of their Gas and Water Undertakings.	
	Marlow Water Order 1902 Order empowering the Great Marlow Water Company Limited to construct maintain and continue additional Waterworks and to raise additional Capital.	
	Mid-Kent Water Order 1902 Order empowering the Mid-Kent Water Company to extend their Limits of Supply.	
	Pinxton Water Order 1902 Order authorising the maintenance and continuance of Waterworks and the supply of Water in a portion of the Parish of Pinxton in the County of Derby.	
Gas and Water Orders Confirmation (No. 3) Act 1902	2 Edw. 7. c. ccxlix	18 November 1902
An Act to confirm a Provisional Order made by the Board of Trade under the Gas and Water Works Facilities Act 1870 relating to Marlow Water.
	Marlow Water (No. 2) Order 1902 Order to amend and vary the provisions of the Marlow Water Order 1889.	
Lanarkshire (Middle Ward District) Water Order Confirmation Act 1902 (repealed)	2 Edw. 7. c. ccl	18 November 1902
An Act to confirm a Provisional Order under the Private Legislation Procedure (Scotland) Act 1899 relating to Lanarkshire (Middle Ward District) Water. (Repealed by Lanarkshire County Council Order Confirmation Act 1939 (2 & 3 Geo. 6. c. xcii))
	Lanarkshire (Middle Ward District) Water Order 1902 Provisional Order to enable the District Committee of the Middle Ward of the County of Lanark to construct additional Waterworks and to abandon certain authorised works to revive and extend the powers for the purchase of lands for and for the completion of certain authorised works to enable the County Council of the County of Lanark to borrow additional money and for other purposes.	
Dumbarton Corporation (Further Powers) Order Confirmation Act 1902	2 Edw. 7. c. ccli	18 November 1902
An Act to confirm a Provisional Order under the Private Legislation Procedure (Scotland) Act 1899 relating to Dumbarton Corporation.
	Dumbarton Corporation (Further Powers) Order 1902 Provisional Order to confer on the Provost Magistrates and Councillors of the Royal Burgh of Dumbarton further borrowing powers and for other purposes.	
Wick Burgh Extension Order Confirmation Act 1902	2 Edw. 7. c. cclii	18 November 1902
An Act to confirm a Provisional Order under the Private Legislation Procedure (Scotland) Act 1899 relating to Wick Burgh Extension.
	Wick Burgh Extension Order 1902 Provisional Order to extend the Boundaries of the Burgh of Wick and the Royalty thereof and for other purposes.	
Richmond, Petersham and Ham Open Spaces Act 1902	2 Edw. 7. c. ccliii	18 November 1902
An Act to confirm agreements for vesting common and other land in the local authorities of Richmond Ham and Kingston and Surrey County Council as public open spaces and for other purposes.
South Eastern and London, Chatham and Dover Railways Act 1902	2 Edw. 7. c. ccliv	18 November 1902
An Act to enable the South Eastern Railway Company to make a new railway and widenings to enable that Company and the London Chatham and Dover Railway Company to acquire and to hold additional lands to enable the Crowhurst Sidley and Bexhill Railway Company to raise additional capital and for other purposes.
Baker Street and Waterloo Railway Act 1902	2 Edw. 7. c. cclv	18 November 1902
An Act to confer further powers on the Baker Street and Waterloo Railway Company.
Charing Cross, Euston and Hampstead Railway Act 1902	2 Edw. 7. c. cclvi	18 November 1902
An Act for conferring further powers upon the Charing Cross Euston and Hampstead Railway Company for authorising agreements with the Metropolitan District Railway Company the South Eastern and Chatham Railway Companies' Managing Committee the South Eastern Railway Company and the Baker Street and Waterloo Railway Company and for other purposes.
Edgware and Hampstead Railway Act 1902	2 Edw. 7. c. cclvii	18 November 1902
An Act for incorporating the Edgware and Hampstead Railway Company and for empowering them to construct railways from Edgware to Golder's Green near Hampstead and for other purposes.
North West London Railway Act 1902	2 Edw. 7. c. cclviii	18 November 1902
An Act to extend the time for the compulsory purchase of lands for and completion of the railways and works authorised by the North West London Railway Act 1899 and for other purposes.
Brompton and Piccadilly Circus Railway Act 1902	2 Edw. 7. c. cclix	18 November 1902
An Act to confer further powers on the Brompton and Piccadilly Circus Railway Company for the construction of new railways and works and for the use of part of the Metropolitan District Railway to extend the time for compulsory purchase of land and completion of works and to authorise working and other agreements with other companies and for other purposes.
Bexhill and Rotherfield Railway (Abandonment) Act 1902 (repealed)	2 Edw. 7. c. cclx	18 November 1902
An Act for the abandonment of the Bexhill and Rotherfield Railway and for other purposes. (Repealed by Statute Law (Repeals) Act 2013 (c. 2))
Glasgow Corporation (Water and General) Order Confirmation Act 1902	2 Edw. 7. c. cclxi	18 December 1902
An Act to confirm a Provisional Order under the Private Legislation Procedure (Scotland) Act 1899 relating to Glasgow Corporation (Water and General).
	Glasgow Corporation (Water and General) Order 1902 Provisional Order to authorise the Corporation of the City of Glasgow to construct new waterworks in the Counties of Perth Stirling and Renfrew to raise further moneys and for other purposes.	

=== Sources ===
- Volume 40 - 2 Edward VII - 1902 – via Internet Archive.

== See also ==
- List of acts of the Parliament of the United Kingdom
