= Demolished Barnstaple lock-up =

In 1828 Barnstaple, England had one lock up that needed replacing. In 1874, a new lock up was built on Cattle Street, nicknamed as Bakehouse due to the fact that the residents were forced to bake bread as punishment. The Locals were kept for minor offences and were held temporarily until they could be moved to a larger prison. There was only 32 official cells. After four years, in 1878, the Prison Act 1877 caused the government to claim ownership of the prison and forced the local council to buy back their own jail for the sum of £1233 (£150,000–£200,000 in today's money). The prisoners were then sent to the County Gaol in Exeter, and the building was repurposed as an isolation hospital before being demolished in 1954. Nowadays, the site is a private car park.
