= Licensing (Ireland) Act 1902 =

Act of the Parliament of the United Kingdom

Licensing (Ireland) Act 1902 (Note: Section 1.)
- Act of Parliament
- Parliament of the United Kingdom
- Long title: An Act to amend the Law relating to issue of Licences for the Sale of Intoxicating Liquours in Ireland.
- Citation: 2 Edw. 7. c. 18
- Territorial extent: Ireland

Dates
- Royal assent: 31 July 1902
- Commencement: 31 July 1902 (Note: Section 2.)
- Repealed
Other legislation
Repealed by	Intoxicating Liquor Act (Northern Ireland) 1923

Status: Repealed

Text of statute as originally enacted

The Licensing (Ireland) Act 1902 (2 Edw. 7. c. 18) was an act of the Parliament of the United Kingdom, given royal assent on 31 July 1902, and repealed in 1923.

Thea act prohibited the issue of new licence for the sale of alcohol, for consumption on or off the premises, after the passage of the act, except to:

- Premises currently licensed, or which had been licensed between 1 January 1902 and the date of the act;
- Hotels (defined as a separate house with at least ten beds, used exclusively for the sleeping accommodation of travellers, and with no public bar); or
- Railway refreshment rooms.

However, local authorities were given wide powers to grant licences outside these restrictions. If a lease on a licensed premises expired, causing the licence to be surrendered, a new one could be granted to suitable premises in the immediate vicinity. There were also provisions for new licences in parishes which had had significant increase in population. The granting of licences to extensions of premises, or the transferral of licences, was not affected by the act.

All premises had to be of a minimum rateable value, which varied from thirty pounds in Dublin and Belfast to ten in rural counties.

The act extended to Ireland only, and was to continue in force until 31 December 1907. It was repealed in the United Kingdom, where it remained in force in Northern Ireland after partition, by the Intoxicating Liquor Act (Northern Ireland) 1923.
