= Prison Officers (Pensions) Act 1902 =

Act of the Parliament of the United Kingdom

Prison Officers (Pensions) Act 1902 (Note: Section 2.)
- Act of Parliament
- Parliament of the United Kingdom
- Long title: An Act to amend the Prison Act, 1877, with respect to the Allowances of Prison Officers under section thirty-six of that Act.
- Citation: 2 Edw. 7. c. 9
- Territorial extent: United Kingdom

Dates
- Royal assent: 22 July 1902
- Commencement: 22 July 1902 (Note: The Acts of Parliament (Commencement) Act 1793.)
- Repealed: 22 December 1927
Other legislation
| Amends | Prison Act 1877 |
| Repealed by | Statute Law Revision Act 1927 |

Status: Repealed

Text of statute as originally enacted

The Prison Officers (Pensions) Act 1902 (2 Edw. 7. c. 9) was an act of the Parliament of the United Kingdom, given royal assent on 22 July 1902 and repealed in 1927.

It amended the Prison Act 1877 (40 & 41 Vict. c. 21) to confirm and clarify the system for granting pension annuities to prison officers, stating that they were to not exceed the routine civil service scale, except in special circumstances, and then were not to exceed a maximum of two-thirds of the original salary.

== Subsequent developments ==
The whole act was repealed by section 1 of, and the part I of the schedule to, the Statute Law Revision Act 1927 (17 & 18 Geo. 5. c. 42), which came into force on 22 December 1927.
