= University of Wales Act 1902 =

Act of the Parliament of the United Kingdom

University of Wales Act 1902 (Note: Section 2.)
- Act of Parliament
- Parliament of the United Kingdom
- Long title: An Act to extend the privileges of the Graduates of the University of Wales
- Citation: 2 Edw. 7. c. 14
- Territorial extent: United Kingdom

Dates
- Royal assent: 22 July 1902
- Commencement: 22 July 1902 (Note: The Acts of Parliament (Commencement) Act 1793.)
- Repealed: 19 November 1998
Other legislation
Repealed by	Statute Law (Repeals) Act 1998

Status: Repealed

Text of statute as originally enacted

Revised text of statute as amended

The University of Wales Act 1902 (2 Edw. 7. c. 14) was an act of the Parliament of the United Kingdom, given royal assent on 22 July 1902.

It provided that if any office was stipulated as being open to graduates of the universities of Oxford, Cambridge, London, or the Victoria University, or any legal exemption was provided to graduates of those universities, then these privileges would likewise extend to the graduates of the University of Wales holding equivalent degrees.

The whole act was repealed by section 1(1) of, and group 2 of part III of schedule 1 to, the Statute Law (Repeals) Act 1998, which came into force on 19 November 1998.
