= Pauper Children (Ireland) Act 1902 =

Act of the Parliament of the United Kingdom

Pauper Children (Ireland) Act 1902 (Note: Section 2.)
- Act of Parliament
- Parliament of the United Kingdom
- Long title: An Act to amend the Pauper Children (Ireland) Act, 1898.
- Citation: 2 Edw. 7. c. 16
- Territorial extent: Ireland (Note: Section 1.)

Dates
- Royal assent: 22 July 1902
- Commencement: 22 July 1902 (Note: The Acts of Parliament (Commencement) Act 1793.)
- Repealed: 1 April 1950
Other legislation
Amends	Pauper Children (Ireland) Act 1898
Repealed by	Children and Young Persons (Northern Ireland) Act 1950

Status: Repealed

Text of statute as originally enacted

The Pauper Children (Ireland) Act 1902 (2 Edw. 7. c. 16) was an act of the Parliament of the United Kingdom, given royal assent on 22 July 1902, and repealed in 1950.

It defined the terms "orphan child" and "deserted child" for the purpose of the Pauper Children (Ireland) Act 1898 (61 & 62 Vict. c. 30), in the cases of both legitimate and illegitimate children.

The whole act by the Children and Young Persons (Northern Ireland) Act 1950.
