= Agriculture and Technical Instruction (Ireland) Act 1902 =

Act of the Parliament of the United Kingdom

Agriculture and Technical Instruction (Ireland) Act 1902 (Note: Section 2.)
- Act of Parliament
- Parliament of the United Kingdom
- Long title: An Act to enable County Councils in Ireland to exclude Congested Districts from the Area of Charge for certain purposes.
- Citation: 2 Edw. 7. c. 3
- Territorial extent: United Kingdom

Dates
- Royal assent: 23 June 1902
- Commencement: 23 June 1902 (Note: The Acts of Parliament (Commencement) Act 1793.)
- Repealed: 5 November 1993
Other legislation
Repealed by	Statute Law (Repeals) Act 1993

Status: Repealed

Text of statute as originally enacted

The Agriculture and Technical Instruction (Ireland) Act 1902 (2 Edw. 7. c. 3) was an act of the Parliament of the United Kingdom, given royal assent on 23 June 1902.

The council of any county defined as a "congested districts county" by the Purchase of Land (Ireland) Act 1891 (54 & 55 Vict. c. 48) was permitted, when raising any sum for agriculture or technical training, to exclude the congested districts from the area from which the sum was levied.

== Subsequent developments ==
The whole act was repealed by section 1(1) of, and group 2 of part XVI of schedule 1 to, the Statute Law (Repeals) Act 1993, which came into force on 5 November 1993.
