= Hastings and District Electric Tramways =

Tramway operator in Sussex, England

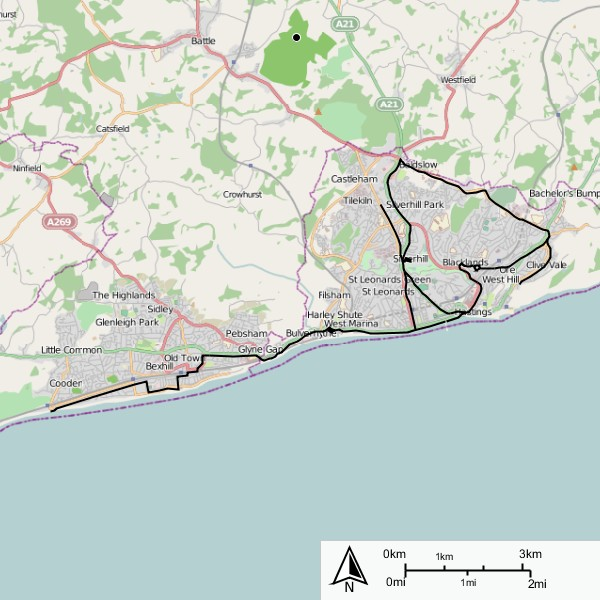
- Map of the routes of the Hastings and District Electric Tramways

Operation
- Locale: Hastings
- Open: 31 July 1905
- Close: 15 May 1929
- Status: Closed

Infrastructure
- Track gauge: 3 ft 6 in (1,067 mm)
- Propulsion system: Electric

Statistics
- Route length: 19.57 miles (31.49 km)

Hastings and District Electric Tramways operated a tramway service in Hastings between 1905 and 1929.

== History ==
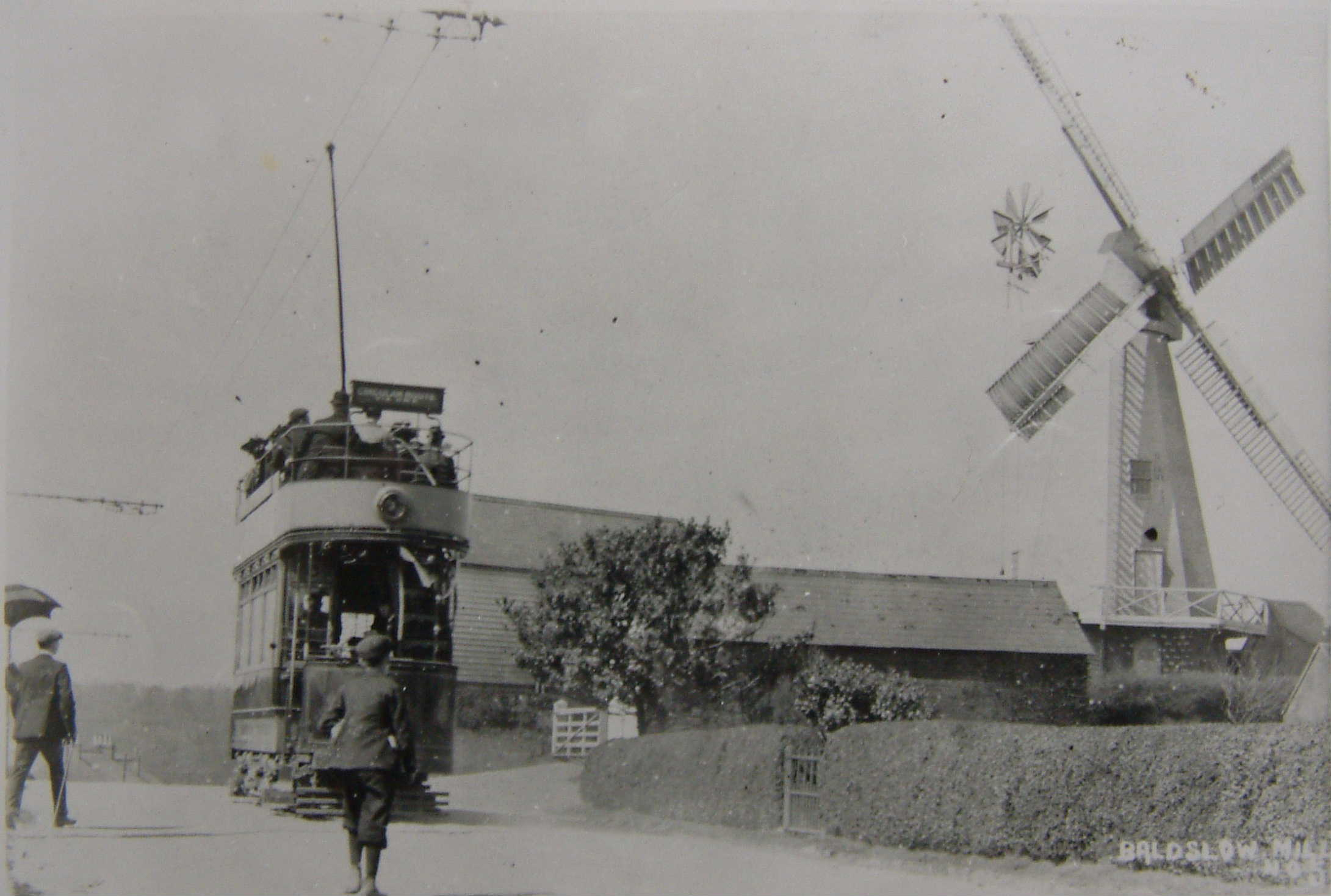
Tram at Baldslow Mill c.1909

Hastings Tramways Act 1900
- Act of Parliament
- Parliament of the United Kingdom
- Long title: An Act to incorporate the Hastings Tramways Company and to empower that Company to make and maintain tramways and other works in the county borough of Hastings and for other purposes.
- Citation: 63 & 64 Vict. c. cxl

Dates
- Royal assent: 30 July 1900

Other legislation
- Repealed by: Hastings Tramways Act 1957

Status: Repealed

Text of statute as originally enacted

Hastings Tramways (Extension of Time) Act 1902
- Act of Parliament
- Parliament of the United Kingdom
- Long title: An Act to extend the periods for taking lands for and for the construction and completion of the light railway and tramways transferred by and authorised by the Hastings Tramways Act 1900 and for other purposes.
- Citation: 2 Edw. 7. c. clix

Dates
- Royal assent: 31 July 1902

Other legislation
- Amends: Hastings Tramways Act 1900
- Repealed by: Hastings Tramways Act 1957

Status: Repealed

Hastings Tramways (Extensions) Act 1903
- Act of Parliament
- Parliament of the United Kingdom
- Long title: An Act to empower the Hastings Tramways Company to construct extension tramways in the county borough of Hastings and for other purposes.
- Citation: 3 Edw. 7. c. xcviii

Dates
- Royal assent: 21 July 1903

Other legislation
- Repealed by: Hastings Tramways Act 1957

Status: Repealed

Text of statute as originally enacted

Hastings Tramways Act 1905
- Act of Parliament
- Parliament of the United Kingdom
- Long title: An Act to extend the time limited for the completion of the tramways light railways and works authorised to be constructed by the Hastings Tramways Company and to revive the powers for the compulsory purchase of land by that Company and to authorise the construction of certain deviations of their authorised light railways and other works and for other purposes.
- Citation: 5 Edw. 7. c. xcix

Dates
- Royal assent: 11 July 1905

Other legislation
- Repealed by: Hastings Tramways Act 1957

Status: Repealed

Text of statute as originally enacted

Hastings Tramways Act 1920
- Act of Parliament
- Parliament of the United Kingdom
- Long title: An Act to authorise the Hastings Tramways Company to work a tramway authorised by the Hastings Tramways (Extensions) Act, 1903, by electrical power on the overhead system; and to construct the necessary works for that purpose.
- Citation: 10 & 11 Geo. 5. c. lxxxiv

Dates
- Royal assent: 4 August 1920

Other legislation
- Amends: Hastings Tramways (Extensions) Act 1903
- Repealed by: Hastings Tramways Act 1957

Status: Repealed

Hastings Tramways Act 1921
- Act of Parliament
- Parliament of the United Kingdom
- Long title: An Act to empower the Hasting Tramways Company to construct extension tramways in the county borough of Hastings and for other purposes.
- Citation: 11 & 12 Geo. 5. c. lxxxv

Dates
- Royal assent: 17 August 1921

Other legislation
- Repealed by: Hastings Tramways Act 1957

Status: Repealed

The tramway opened in two sections which operated independently until 1907. Following the passing of legislation permitting the installation of the tramways, services started in Hastings on 31 July 1905. The depot was located in Silverhill at TQ 8017 1067.

A second depot was built at Bulverhythe (TQ 7815 0880) for services between St Leonards-on-Sea and Bexhill which started on 9 April 1906. That line finally reached Cooden Beach on 28 July 1906. On 12 January 1907, the two systems were connected along the seafront.

The trams ran as far as Bexhill, and were worked by overhead electric wires, except for the stretch along the seafront from Bo-Peep to the Memorial, which was initially worked by the Dolter Stud contact system due to concerns that the overhead cabling would obstruct sea views, a sentiment that was cemented in the legislation permitting the tram service. Following unsuccessful attempts to mount trams for this route with a small petrol engine/generator combination and a further act of Parliament, overhead electrification was extended to this section in 1921.

== Closure ==
Under the Hastings Tramways Act 1905 (5 Edw. 7. c. xcix), the councils had an option to buy the Hastings Tramway Company in 1925. They didn't, so the company reviewed its options. The tramway service closed on 15 May 1929 and was replaced by trolleybuses on the same routes, except for a short section of private right of way on Pebsham Marsh, off Bexhill Road and a new link through High Street.

Two tramcars survive, 48 and 56. Both are under restoration by the Hastings Tramway Club.
