= Rothesay and Ettrick Bay Light Railway =

Railway line in Argyll and Bute, Scotland

Rothesay Tramway Co.
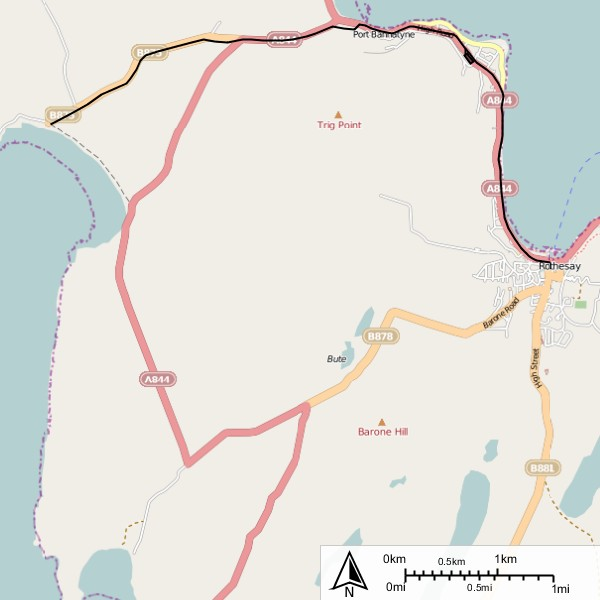
- Map of Rothesay tramway

Operation
- Locale: Rothesay
- Open: 19 August 1902
- Close: 30 September 1936
- Status: Closed

Infrastructure
- Propulsion system: Electric originally horse drawn

Statistics
- Route length: 4.87 miles (7.84 km)
Rothesay Tramway era: 1882–1902
- Track gauge: 4 ft (1,219 mm)
- Propulsion system: Horse drawn
- Route length: 2.37 miles (3.81 km)
Rothesay and Ettrick Bay Light Railway era: 1902–1936
- Track gauge: 3 ft 6 in (1,067 mm)
- Propulsion system: Electric
- Depot: Port Bannatyne
- Route length: 4.87 miles (7.84 km)

The Rothesay tramway was a narrow gauge electric tramway on the Isle of Bute, Scotland. It opened in 1882 as a 4 ft (1,219 mm) gauge horse tramway, was converted to a 3 ft 6 in (1,067 mm) gauge electric tramway in 1902, and closed in 1936. It was the only public tramway to be built on a Scottish island.

== History ==
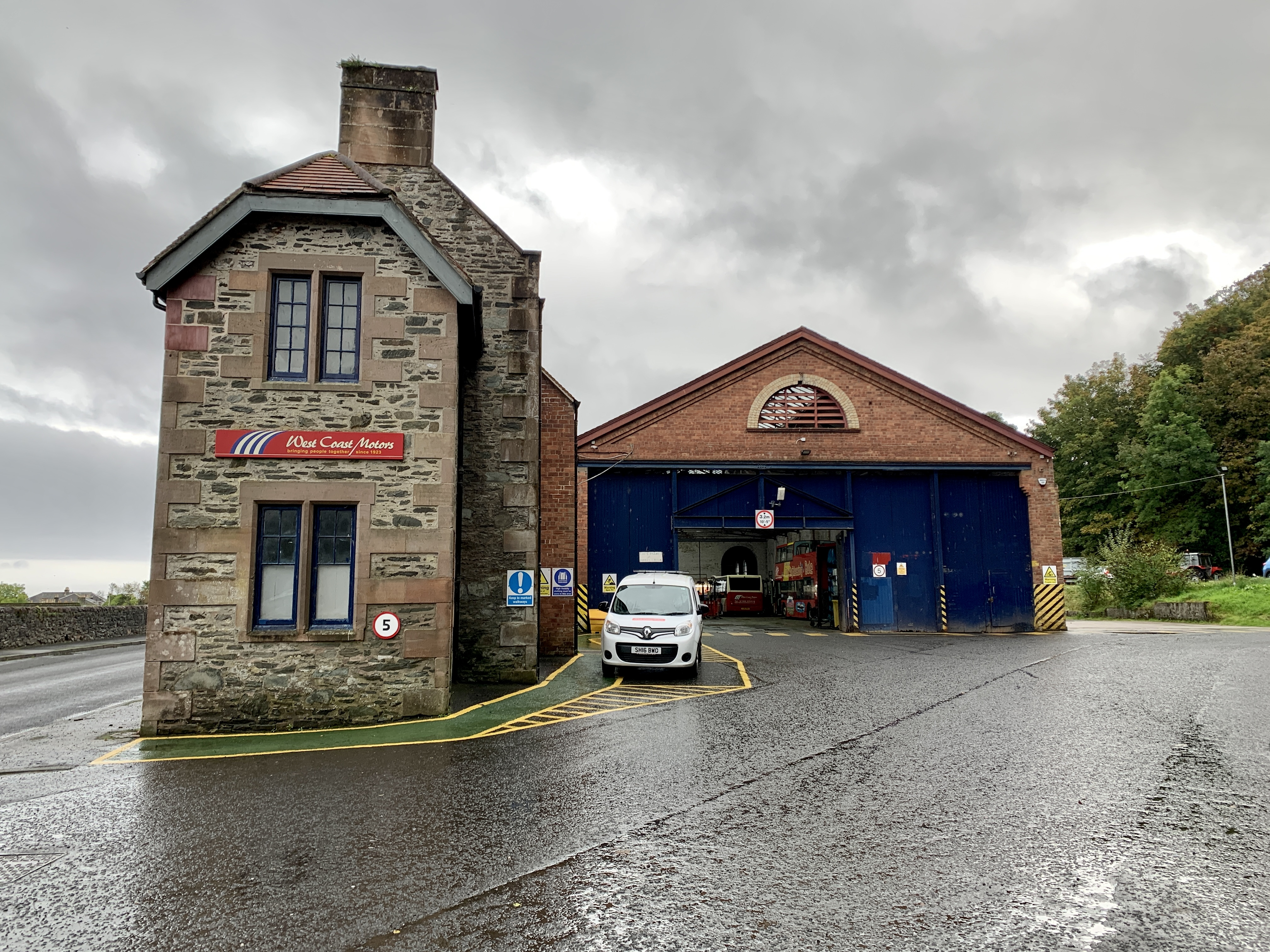
Former depot in Port Bannatyne now a bus garage used by West Coast Motors

On 25 November 1879, the Rothesay Tramways Co. Ltd. was formed, to promote and operate a tramway on the Isle of Bute. It was the only tramway to be built on a Scottish island, and construction was authorised by the Rothesay Tramways Order 1880, ratified by the Tramways Orders Confirmation (No. 2) Act 1880 (43 & 44 Vict. c. clxxiii). Work on building the infrastructure started in early 1882, and by the start of June, it was completed. A public opening ceremony was held before the tramway had been inspected by the Board of Trade, and so it closed until 10 June, when that inspection took place. It was a horse-drawn 4 ft (1,219 mm) gauge tramway running from the promenade at Rothesay to Port Bannatyne.

The line was 2.37 miles (3.81 km) long, with double track at the Rothesay end and single track further out. Rolling stock for the opening was obtained from Saville Street Foundry and Engineering, who were based in Sheffield, England. Cars 1 to 8 were toastracks with canvas roofs, while cars 9 to 12 were enclosed single-deck saloons. In July, a local joiner called James McBride built two toastracks fitted with roofs, which were numbered 13 and 14. William Lauder of Rothesay supplied two toastracks in 1891, numbered 15 and 16, while two more arrived in 1894, numbered 17 and 18, with number 19 arriving in 1897. The final three were probably also built by Lauder, but sources are not clear.

British Electric Traction, a company which was steadily acquiring a portfolio of tramway companies, approached Rothesay Tramways in 1899 with a proposal to buy the tramway and convert it to electric operation. Despite an initial refusal, British Electric Traction made repeated approaches, and in 1901 a deal was agreed. In advance of the sale, the Tramway company agreed to apply for permission to carry out the upgrade, and to negotiate the right to continue to operate the trams from 1902 until 1936. This required negotiations with the Rothesay Commissioners and because the track extended beyond the borders of the burgh, with Bute County Council. Once this was obtained, the tramway was sold to British Electric Traction in 1901, who acquired the existing trackbed, 19 trams, and 41 horses. The horse tramway continued in operation until 2 March 1902, when it closed to allow the reconstruction to proceed.

=== Electrification ===
Dick, Kerr & Co. were the contractors tasked with the work. The old rails were removed and sold, to be replaced by new rails at the narrower gauge of 3 ft 6 in (1,067 mm). Ten of the horse-drawn trams were regauged, and operated a temporary service on the relaid track from 17 May 1902. Track laying was completed by early June, and all work had been finished by August. An official opening was held on 13 August, but as with the horse tramway opening, the Board of Trade had not yet passed the line for operation, and so electric trams did not start running until 19 August.

Rothesay was one of only six local authorities in Scotland which were generating their own power in the early 1900s. The scope of this was quite limited, supplying electric lighting at the harbour and the waterfront. The Glenburn Hydropathic Establishment in Rothesay generated their own electricity, and the tramway likewise ran their own generating station. It was not until the 1920s that the corporation started to implement a public supply of power, and the tramway assisted by selling spare power to the corporation.

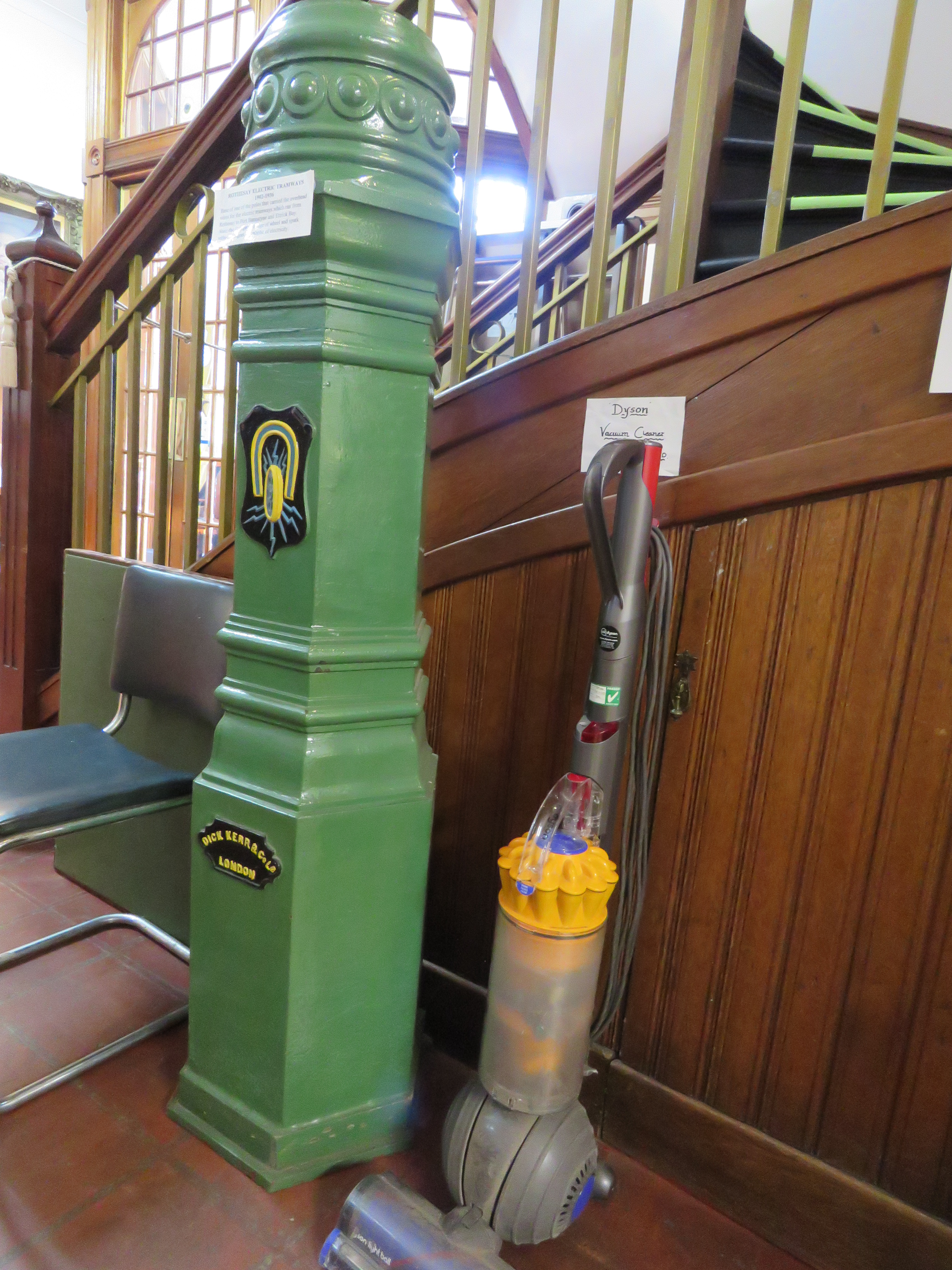
The base of a wiring pole is displayed in Bute Museum

As well as building the track, Dick, Kerr effectively supplied 15 of the initial 20 bogie vehicles, which were manufactured by Electric Railway and Tramway Carriage Works, a company that they had set up. Ten were open toastracks with seating for 50 passengers, and five were combination cars with 46 seats, which were used in bad weather and during the winter. The remaining five open cars were supplied by Brush, and also seated 46.

British Electric Traction acquired McKirdy and McMillan in 1902, a company that ran seven horse buses, and some 70 brakes and cabs. The volume of traffic across the island to Ettrick Bay convinced them that an extension to the tramway would be profitable, and so the Port Bannatyne to Ettrick Bay extension was built, running on its own right of way, rather than along existing streets. The 2.5-mile (4.0 km) extension opened on 13 July 1905, and Dick, Kerr were again employed to build the line. Ettrick Bay terminus was equipped with a siding to hold three spare cars, and enough space to allow six cars to be loaded or unloaded at a time. The trams could run at 25 miles per hour (40 km/h) on the reserved track, whereas they were restricted to slower speeds on the public roads. During the summer months, concerts were held in a hall seating nearly 1000 people at Ettrick Bay, and the company sold combined tram and concert tickets.

On 1 January 1914, control of the company passed to the Scottish General Transport Company, a subsidiary company set up by British Electric Traction. The tramway began to experience competition from motor buses in the 1920s, and started their own bus service between Port Bannatyne to Ettrick Bay in 1925. This proved to be a profitable operation, and the future of the tramway began to look uncertain.

=== Closure ===
On 1 June 1932, the company name changed to Western Scottish Motor Traction Company, and the tramway closed on 30 September 1936. An official "last tram" left Rotheway at 17:00, but the final tram departed for the depot from Guildford Square in Rothesay at 23:00.

=== Remains ===
The tram depot in Port Bannatyne, which used to hold 20 trams, is now in use as a bus garage, and there are still tramway rails embedded in the floor. The depot consists of single storey red brick sheds with arcaded bays. A narrow building in front of the garage houses the enquiry office for the bus company. It was constructed in the early 20th century as part of the tramway development, and is a category C listed building, although the depot is not listed. Around 1 mile (1.6 km) of the reserved trackbed has been reused as a footpath and also forms part of the West Island Way long distance footpath. Rothesay Museum have three artefacts from the tramway. The handle used to operate the controller of the final tram to run on the system is displayed in a glass case. They also have the cast metal base for one of the overhead line poles, and a replica seat from a toastrack car. The cast iron ends are original, and although the woodwork is newer, its maker used the original specifications to ensure its accuracy.

== Fleet ==
- 1–10 Electric Railway and Tramway Carriage Works 1902 Toastracks
- 11–15 Electric Railway and Tramway Carriage Works 1902 Single-deck saloons
- 16–20 Brush Electrical Engineering Company 1903 Toastracks

== Bibliography ==
- Bloomfield, G T (2012). The North of Scotland Hydro-Electric Board Area (PDF). University of Guelph. Archived (PDF) from the original on 28 June 2023.
- Holland, Julian (2007). Amazing and Extraordinary Railway Facts. David & Charles. ISBN 978-0-7153-2582-7.
- Klapper, Charles (1974). The Golden Age of Tramways. David & Charles. ISBN 978-0-7153-6458-1.
- Turner, Keith (1996). The Directory of British Tramways. Patrick Stephens. ISBN 978-1-85260-549-0.
- Twaddle, Graham (2000). Old Bute. Stenlake Publishing. ISBN 978-1-84033-099-1.
