= Trolleybuses in Hastings =

Hastings trolleybus system
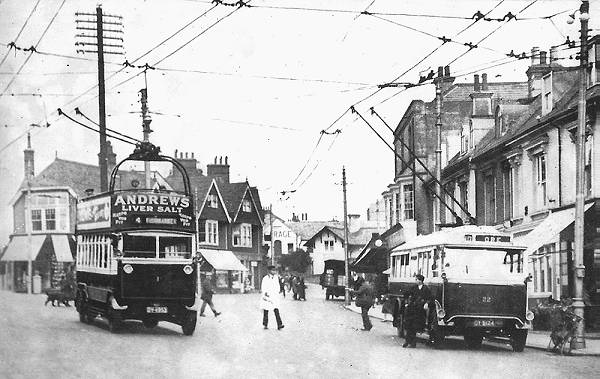
- A pair of Hastings trolleybuses, ca. 1928.

Operation
- Locale: Hastings, East Sussex, England
- Open: 1 April 1928
- Close: 31 May 1959
- Status: Closed
- Routes: 10
- Operators: Hastings Tramway Company (1928–1935); Maidstone & District Motor Services (1935–1959)

Infrastructure
- Depots: Beaufort Rd (35 buses) and, until 1941, Bulverhythe (23 buses)
- Stock: 1929 58 6-wheel Guy BTX with regenerative and air braking made up of 8 57-seat open tops and 49 37-seat single deck. Replaced by enclosed 4-wheel double deckers - 1940 20 AEC, 1946-7 25 Sunbeam.

Statistics
Overview
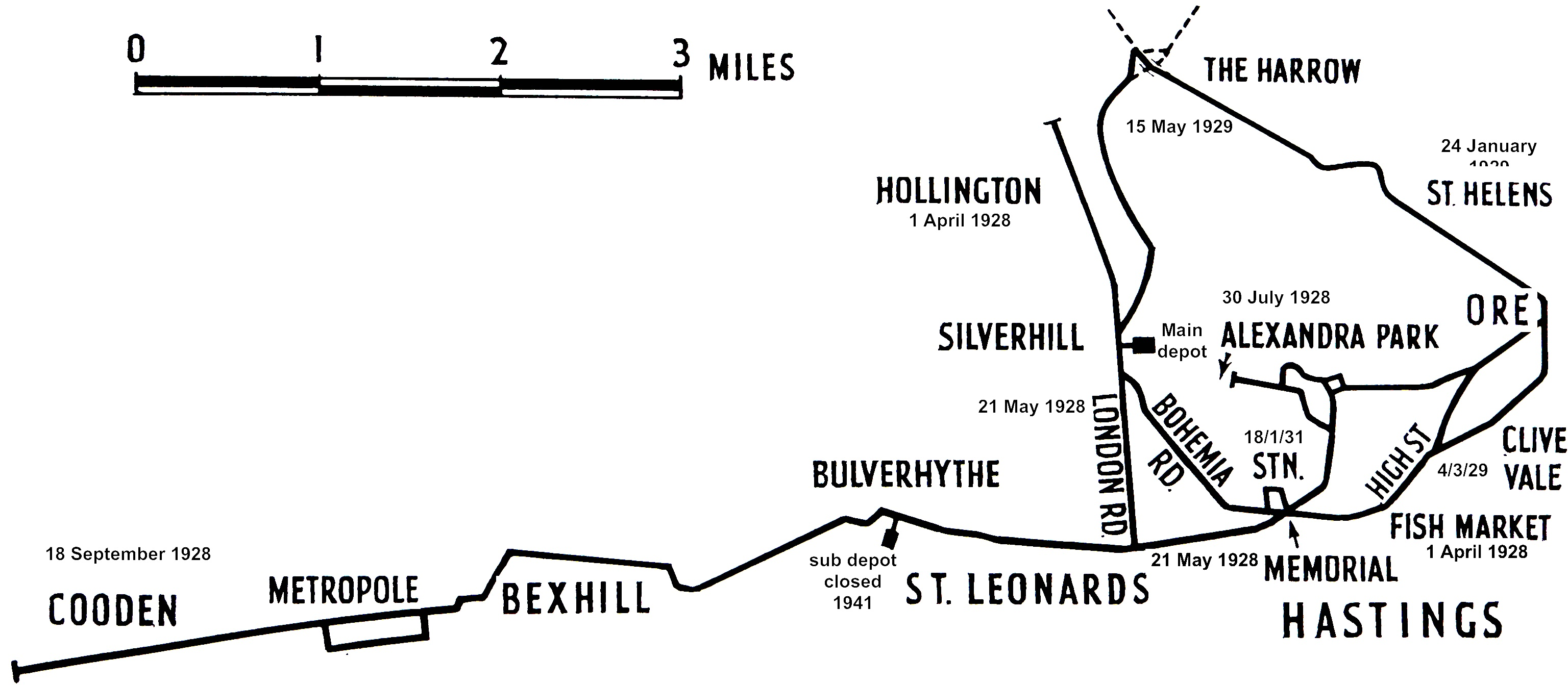

Hastings Tramways Company (Trolley Vehicles) Act 1927
- Act of Parliament
- Parliament of the United Kingdom
- Long title: An Act to authorise the Hastings Tramways Company to run trolley vehicles in substitution for their tramway and light railway services and on other routes and for other purposes.
- Citation: 17 & 18 Geo. 5. c. lxix

Dates
- Royal assent: 29 July 1927

Other legislation
- Repealed by: Hastings Tramways Act 1957

Status: Repealed

Text of statute as originally enacted

Hastings Tramways Company (Trolley Vehicles) Act 1930
- Act of Parliament
- Parliament of the United Kingdom
- Long title: An Act to authorise the Hastings Tramways Company to run trolley vehicles on additional routes and for other purposes.
- Citation: 20 & 21 Geo. 5. c. cxxvi

Dates
- Royal assent: 10 July 1930

Other legislation
- Repealed by: Hastings Tramways Act 1957

Status: Repealed

Text of statute as originally enacted

The Hastings trolleybus system once served the town of Hastings, East Sussex, England. Opened on 1 April 1928, it gradually replaced the Hastings tramway network, with the first route to be converted that from the Fishmarket to Hollington, East Sussex and the last, the circular route. Tram replacement cost £1,383 per mile, (Note: About 75119) but increased average speed from 7.5 to over 10 mph and cut costs from 13d to 10d per mile. (Note: About 2.94)

By the standards of the various now-defunct trolleybus systems in the United Kingdom, the Hastings system was a moderately sized one, with a total of 10 routes, and a maximum fleet of 58 trolleybuses. However, by May 1929 Hastings had 21 miles of trolleybus routes, then the longest in the world. It was closed relatively early, on 31 May 1959.

Hastings Tramways Act 1957
- Act of Parliament
- Parliament of the United Kingdom
- Long title: An Act to transfer the undertaking of the Hastings Tramways Company to the Maidstone and District Motor Services Limited to authorise the discontinuance of the services of trolley vehicles authorised by the Hastings Tramways and Trolley Vehicles Acts 1900 to 1930 and for other purposes.
- Citation: 5 & 6 Eliz. 2. c. xxxvi

Dates
- Royal assent: 31 July 1957

Other legislation
- Repeals/revokes: Hastings Tramways Act 1900; Hastings Tramways (Extension of Time) Act 1902; Hastings Tramways (Extensions) Act 1903; Hastings Tramways Act 1905; Hastings Tramways Act 1920; Hastings Tramways Act 1921; Hastings Tramways Company (Trolley Vehicles) Act 1927; Hastings Tramways Company (Trolley Vehicles) Act 1930

Text of statute as originally enacted

Maidstone & District Motor Services bought the Tramway Co. in November 1935, but didn't merge it until 1957. The livery changed from brown to green after the takeover, but the 'Hastings Tramways' logo remained until 1957. The power source also changed in 1936, when the tramway power station at Ore was replaced by municipal power.

Four of the former Hastings trolleybuses are now preserved. One is at the Trolleybus Museum at Sandtoft, Lincolnshire, and another at East Anglia Transport Museum, Carlton Colville, Suffolk. The remaining two, one of which was fitted with a diesel engine in 1959–60, are owned by the Hastings Trolleybus Restoration Group, Bexhill-on-Sea, East Sussex. The earliest is 1929 open top No.3, which was stored in 1938, but restored in 1952 to run summer open top services.

== See also ==
- Transport in Hastings
- List of trolleybus systems in the United Kingdom
