= Prison Act 1877 =

Act of the Parliament of the United Kingdom

Prison Act 1877 (Note: Section 1.)
- Act of Parliament
- Parliament of the United Kingdom
- Long title: An Act to amend the Law relating to Prisons in England.
- Citation: 40 & 41 Vict. c. 21
- Territorial extent: England and Wales (Note: Section 3.)

Dates
- Royal assent: 12 July 1877
- Commencement: 1 April 1878 (Note: Section 2.)
- Repealed: 1 October 1952
Other legislation
Amends	Prison Act 1865
Amended by	Statute Law Revision Act 1883; Prison (Officers' Superannuation) Act 1886; Sheriffs Act 1887; Coroners Act 1887; Prison Officers (Pensions) Act 1902; Local Government Act 1933; Criminal Justice Act 1948; Statute Law Revision Act 1950
Repealed by	Prison Act 1952
Relates to	Prisons (Scotland) Act 1877

Status: Repealed

Text of statute as originally enacted

The Prison Act 1877 (40 & 41 Vict. c. 21) was an act of the Parliament of the United Kingdom that aimed to alter the way in which British prisons were operated.

== Background ==
By the 19th century, concerns had been raised about the uncoordinated and incoherent nature of the prison system in Britain. Many gaols were operated by local authorities, to a varying degree of quality. The Prison Act 1865 (28 & 29 Vict. c. 126 had increased central controls over these prisons, but local practices continued to vary widely.

In 1877, Parliament took the major step of enacting a long-standing proposal to centralise the running of British prisons.

The Home Secretary was given powers over the new structure, which was delegated in the act to the new Board of Prison Commissioners, supported by an inspectorate and central staff. Further legislation was not felt necessary until 1895. (Note: Prison Act 1898)

== Provisions ==
=== Short title, commencement and extent ===
Section 1 of the act provided that the act may be cited as "The Prison Act, 1877".

Section 2 of the act provided that the act would come into force on 1 April 1878.

Section 3 of the act provided that the act would not extend to Scotland or Ireland.

== Subsequent developments ==
Sections 22, 23, 35, 36, 52, 53 and 55 of the act were repealed by section 1(1) of, and the first schedule to, the Statute Law Revision Act 1950 (14 Geo. 6. c. 6), which came into force on 23 May 1950.

The whole act was repealed by section 54(2) of, and part I of the fourth schedule to, the Prison Act 1952 (15 & 16 Geo. 6 & 1 Eliz. 2. c. 52), which came into force on 1 October 1952.

== See also ==
- Prison Act

== Bibliography ==
- Anderson, Robert. The Prison Acts of 1877 and 1865. London. 1878. Catalogue.
- Fox, Lionel. (2001) The English Prison and Borstal Systems: an account of the prison and Borstal systems. London: Routledge. ISBN 978-0-415-17738-2.
- Wilkinson, Robert. The Law of Prisons in England and Wales, being the Prison Act, 1865 (28 & 29 Vict. c. 126), and the Prison Act, 1877 (40 & 41 Vict. c. 21). Knight & Co. Fleet Street, London. 1878. Google Books Internet Archive.
