= Export Guarantees Act 1937 =

Act of the Parliament of the United Kingdom

Export Guarantees Act 1937 (Note: Section 4(1).)
- Act of Parliament
- Parliament of the United Kingdom
- Long title: An Act to amend and consolidate the Overseas Trade Acts, 1920 to 1934.
- Citation: 1 Edw. 8 & 1 Geo. 6. c. 61
- Territorial extent: United Kingdom

Dates
- Royal assent: 30 July 1937
- Commencement: 30 July 1937 (Note: The Acts of Parliament (Commencement) Act 1793.)
- Repealed: 28 February 1939
Other legislation
Amends	See § Repealed enactments
Repeals/revokes	See § Repealed enactments
Repealed by	Export Guarantees Act 1939

Status: Repealed

Text of statute as originally enacted

The Export Guarantees Act 1937 (1 Edw. 8 & 1 Geo. 6. c. 61) was an act of the Parliament of the United Kingdom that consolidated enactments related to overseas trade guarantees in the United Kingdom.

== Provisions ==
=== Repealed enactments ===
Section 4(2) of the act repealed 9 enactments, listed in the schedule to the act.

Citation	Short title	Extent of repeal
10 & 11 Geo. 5. c. 29	Overseas Trade (Credits and Insurance) Act 1920	The whole act.
11 & 12 Geo. 5. c. 26	Overseas Trade (Credits and Insurance) Amendment Act 1921	The whole act.
11 & 12 Geo. 5. c. 65	Trade Facilities Act 1921	Section two, subsection (2) of section three and the Schedule.
13 Geo. 5. Sess. 2. c. 4	Trade Facilities and Loans Guarantee Act 1922	Section four.
14 & 15 Geo. 5. c. 8	Trade Facilities Act 1924	Section three.
16 & 17 Geo. 5. c. 3	Trade Facilities Act 1926	Section two and in section three the words from "and the Overseas Trade Acts, 1920 to 1924," to the end of the section.
19 & 20 Geo. 5. c. 12	Overseas Trade Act 1929	The whole act.
20 & 21 Geo. 5. c. 31	Overseas Trade Act 1930	The whole act.
24 & 25 Geo. 5. c. 12	Overseas Trade Act 1934	The whole act.

== Subsequent developments ==
The whole act was repealed by section 1(6) of the Export Guarantees Act 1939 (2 & 3 Geo. 6. c. 5), which came into force on 28 February 1939.
