= Morden Depot =

British rail depot on the London Underground Northern line

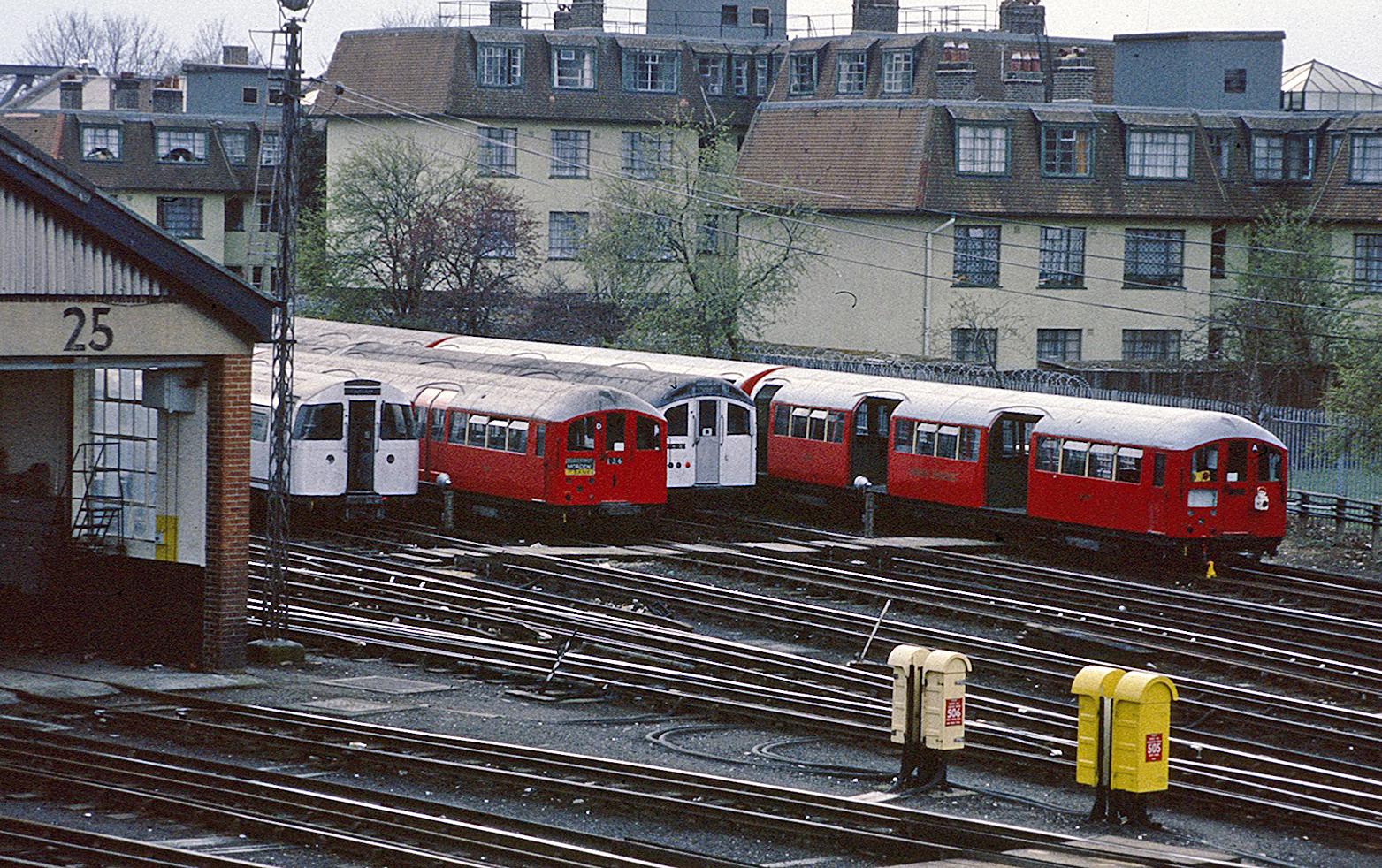
- Trains of 1972, 1959 and 1938 Stock were stabled at Morden Depot in 1988.
- Interactive map of Morden Depot

Location
- Location: Morden, London Borough of Merton, United Kingdom
- Coordinates: 51.398°N 0.197°W

Characteristics
- Owner: London Underground
- Type: Tube stock

History
- Opened: 1926

Morden Depot is a British rolling stock depot on the London Underground Northern line, and is located to the south of Morden Underground station. It was opened in 1926, when the City and South London Railway (C&SLR) was extended from Clapham Common to Morden.

== History ==
In 1913, the City and South London Railway (C&SLR) and the London Electric Railway (LER) were granted authorisation by separate Acts of Parliament to carry out works on their underground routes. The City and South London Railway needed to enlarge its tunnels to accommodate larger rolling stock and the London Electric Railway obtained permission to construct tunnels to connect the C&SLR at Euston to its Hampstead Tube station at Camden Town. The work was delayed by the onset of the First World War and both companies obtained further Acts of Parliament to extend the time limits allowed for the works. Increases in the costs of materials and labour following the war meant that building and maintaining underground railways was no longer economic, and by 1921 the country was in recession, with nearly two million workers unemployed. In order to ease the situation, the government passed the Trade Facilities Act 1921, which enabled companies involved in projects that would create employment to borrow money, with the treasury guaranteeing both the capital amounts and the interest payments. Lord Ashfield, the chairman of the Underground Electric Railways Company of London, which owned both the City and South London Railway and the London Electric Railway, applied for and was granted powers to borrow £5 million under the scheme, which allowed the two projects to proceed.

The Trade Facilities Act 1921 had allowed the treasury to guarantee a total of £25 million, and the scheme was extended by the passing of the Trade Facilities and Loans Guarantee Act 1922, which increased the amounts of funding to £50 million, while extending the time limits by a year. With the prospect of being able to borrow more money, the London Electric Railway obtained an act that authorised an extension of the Hampstead Tube from Charing Cross (now Embankment) to Kennington in 1923, while the City and South London Railway obtained an act for an extension southwards from Clapham Common to Morden, where a new depot would be constructed. The extension was funded by issuing 4.5 percent debenture stock, backed by a government guarantee. Work on the extension started on 31 December 1923 at Clapham, and the line and the depot were opened on 13 September 1926.

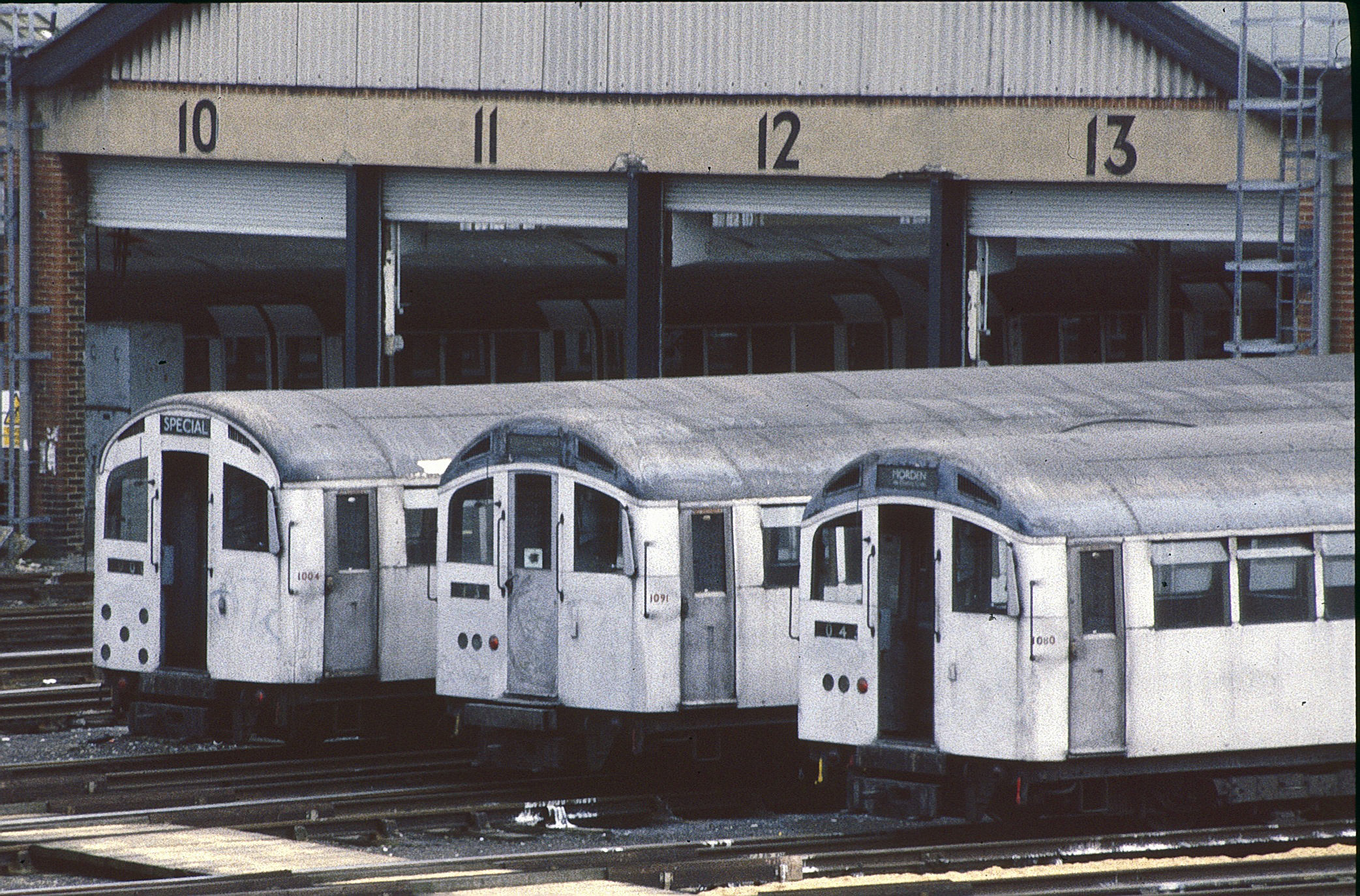
Trains of 1956 Stock (left) and 1959 Stock (centre and right) stabled at Morden in 1988

In order to run the extended service, the first trains of what became known as Standard Stock were ordered. 191 cars were ordered in 1923 from three manufacturers, with a further 127 in 1924 and 120 in 1925. All of the cars were delivered by road, the 1923 Stock going to Golders Green Depot, the 1924 batch going to both Golders Green and the newly constructed Morden Depot, while all of the 1925 build was delivered to Morden. Stock delivered to Morden was stored until the line to Clapham was opened. The cars were towed to Morden by traction engines, mounted on road bogies. Two tall gantries were erected, which enabled the cars to be lifted, for the road bogies to be removed. A railway steam crane was then used to place the railway bogies onto the tracks, and once mounted on them, the City and South London's diminutive steam locomotive was used to move the cars to the stabling sidings.

The line southwards from Clapham runs almost entirely in tunnel, emerging into the open air just to the north of Morden station. Tracks continue southwards beyond the station, passing under the A24 road to reach the depot, which is only accessible from the northern end. At its southern end, the depot is hemmed in by Morden South station and the tracks of the Sutton Loop Line. Within the depot there is a large car shed, with open-air sidings to either side of it. A long footbridge crosses the depot tracks, providing good views of the facility.

Morden Depot is thought to be the first such facility on the London Underground where the term "depot" was applied to a site for stabling and maintenance of trains. It was probably borrowed from army stores served by railways after the end of the First World War, which were also known as depots.Before this, the various underground lines all had "works" where trains were stabled and maintained. Whereas Golders Green is designated as a main depot, Morden is a subsidiary depot, even though 38 trains are stabled there, as opposed to 16 at Golders Green. The designation is based on the range of maintenance functions performed at the depot, not the number of trains, and heavy maintenance for the Northern line is only performed at Golders Green.

=== Rolling stock ===
When first constructed, the depot was used to stable trains of 1924 and 1925 stock until the line northwards to Clapham was competed. With the 1923 stock, trains were formed into five-car units, but as the number of control trailer cars increased, they were formed into six-car units, with motor cars at the outside ends, two control trailers in the middle, and two trailer cars. The delivery of additional standard stock, 112 cars in 1926 and 306 cars in 1927, enabled all trains on the Northern line to be formed of the new air-door stock. The extra stock meant that the frequency of trains could be improved, and the trains lengthened to seven cars. A seven-car train was formed of a four-car motor-trailer-trailer-motor unit, and a three-car motor-trailer-control trailer unit, with the control trailer in the middle of the train. During off-peak hours, trains were shortened to four cars, by uncoupling the three-car unit. Approximately half of the trains had the three-car unit at the Morden end, and thus could be shortened at Morden, with the three-car unit being shunted into the depot, to be re-attached for the next peak service. Trains with the alternative formation were shortened at Edgware or Golders Green. It is unclear whether any trains of gate stock were ever stabled at the depot, as although both types of train ran on the Northern line, the earlier gate stock was only used on short workings from Golders Green and Highgate to Charing Cross, and from Euston to Tooting, but was never used in passenger service as far south as Morden.

The 1935-40 New Works Programme which London Underground initiated included the provision of new trains, and delivery of 1938 Stock began in May 1938. By November, there were 24 trains of the new stock in passenger-carrying service, and further trains were being commissioned at a rate of two per week. At the depot, 1938 Stock gradually replaced Standard Stock, which was transferred to Acton Works and overhauled to see further service on the Central line. Delivery of 1938 Stock continued into the early years of the Second World War, and by mid-1941, there were 96 seven-car trains operational on the Northern line, with 96 spare cars, so the changeover was complete. As a result of the wartime conditions, a considerable number of new cars were stored around the system, some of which had been commissioned, but some of which could not be, because they were missing parts or motors. Five unused trailer cars were listed in the depot returns for Morden, of which some if not all were non-standard cars, which were designed to run in nine-car block trains. The use of nine-car trains was abandoned at the start of the war, and they were not reintroduced. There were also ten non-driving motor cars stored somewhere on the Northern line, but their locations were not specified. In order to improve the situation on the Bakerloo line, there was a concerted attempt to assemble the spare cars into complete trains in 1943, and the five trailer cars left Morden for Acton Works to be modified to run in standard length trains. There was a serious collision of 1938 Stock at the depot on 27 July 1971, when motor car 10278 hit motor car 11159, which was stabled in the car shed on road 6. Both cars were damaged beyond repair, and formed part of the first batch of 1938 Stock to be scrapped in 1972.

=== Newer stock ===
From 1972, Morden Depot ceased to be the preserve of just 1938 Stock, and by 1978, there were five types of stock in use on the Northern line and stabled at the depot. As part of a major programme of updating the rolling stock on the system, the Piccadilly line was equipped with 1973 Stock. This allowed the 1956 Stock and 1959 Stock on that line to be transferred to the Northern line, and some of the 1938 Stock to be scrapped. To make up the number of trains required, 30 trains of 1972 Mark I Stock were ordered, and subsequently, a second batch of 33 trains, known as 1972 Mark II Stock, was ordered, for eventual equipping of the Jubilee line, then under construction. They operated on the Northern line from November 1973, to enable additional 1938 Stock to be scrapped, and were gradually transferred to the Bakerloo line, as more trains of 1959 Stock were displaced from the Piccadilly line. The first train of 1959 Stock arrived in November 1975, and by 1 January 1978, 56 and a half trains had been transferred. The allocation at the beginning of 1978 comprised 10.5 trains of 1938 Stock, three of 1956 Stock, 56.5 of 1958 Stock, 30 of 1972 Mark I Stock and 15 of 1972 Mark II Stock, making 115 in total, although only 95 were required from day to day. Morden Depot was used to stable 39 trains to run the passenger service at that time, with Golders Green supplying 17, and the remaining 39 being stabled at Highgate and Edgware Depots, and on sidings at High Barnet, Highgate Woods, and Golders Green.

Although all of the 1972 Mark II Stock had left the Northern line in time for the opening of the Jubilee line in May 1979, four trains returned in 1983, following service reductions on the Jubilee line. They were modified to be compatible with the Mark I Stock, and a further 14 trains arrived in 1984–1985, as they were displaced from the Jubilee line by newly built 1983 Stock. The extra trains allowed 1959 Stock to be transferred to the Bakerloo line, to replace the remaining trains of 1938 Stock. By mid-1993, there were 2.5 trains of 1956 Stock, 74.5 trains of 1959 Stock, 2.5 trains of 1962 Stock and 24.5 trains of 1972 Stock on the Northern line, making 104 trains in total. The passenger service required 82 trains, of which 38 were supplied by Morden Depot.

The return to the depot stabling a single type of stock began in mid-1998, when the first trains of 1995 Stock entered service on the Northern line, after some 18 months of commissioning problems. As they entered service, the 1956, 1959 and 1962 Stock trains were sent for scrap, and the 1972 Stock was converted to one person operation and transferred to the Bakerloo line. The last train of 1959 Stock worked on 27 January 2000, and this was also the last train to be crewed by a driver and a guard on London Underground, as all subsequent trains were one person operated. By that date, 97 of the new trains had been commissioned, sufficient to run the peak-time service which required 84 trains. The final nine trains had been delivered by 10 April 2001. Trains consist of six cars, and are composed of two three-car units, each made up of a motor car, a trailer car, and an uncoupling non-driving motor car. From the introduction of the July 2002 timetable, 91 trains were required for the peak service, of which Morden Depot supplied 38.

== Notes and references ==
=== Bibliography ===
- Bruce, J Graeme (1968). Tube Trains Under London. London Transport Board.
- Connor, Piers (1989). The 1938 Tube Stock. Capital Transport. ISBN 978-1-85414-115-6.
- Day, John Robert; Reed, John (2011). The Story of London's Underground. Capital Transport. ISBN 978-1-85414-245-0.
- Follenfant, H G (1974). Reconstructing London's Underground. London Transport Executive. ISBN 978-0-85329-039-1.
- Hardy, Brian (1978). London Underground Rolling Stock (3rd Ed.). Capital Transport. ISBN 978-0-904711-09-7.
- Hardy, Brian (1993). London Underground Rolling Stock (13th Ed.). Capital Transport. ISBN 978-1-85414-164-4.
- Hardy, Brian (2002). London Underground Rolling Stock (15th Ed.). Capital Transport. ISBN 978-1-85414-263-4.
- Lee, Charles E (1967). Sixty Years of the Northern. London Transport Executive. ISBN 978-0-85329-013-1.
- Wolmar, Christian (2004). The Subterranean Railway. Atlantic Books. ISBN 978-1-84354-022-9.
