= Pacific Cable Station =

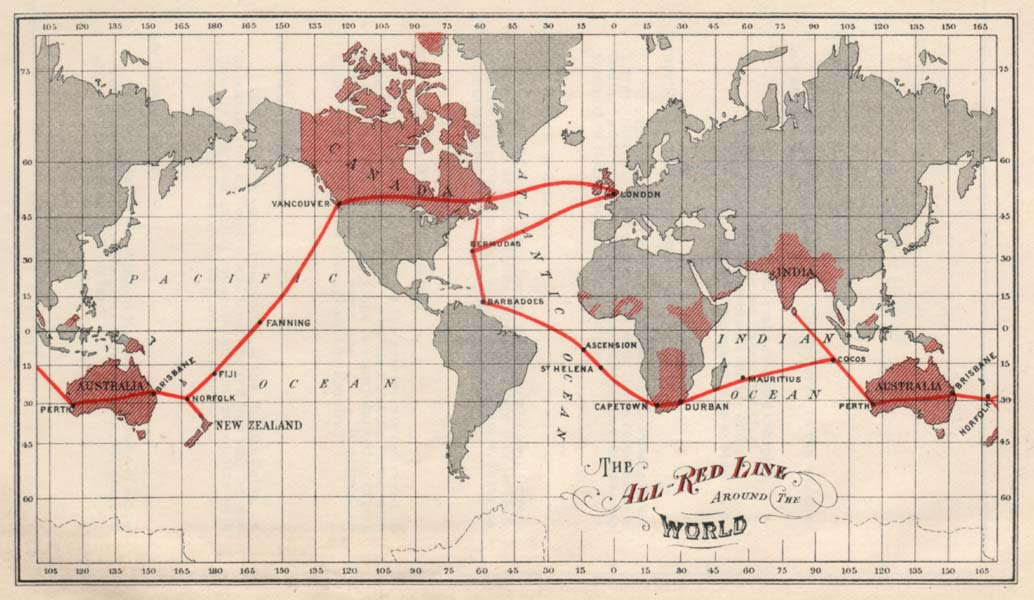
Pacific cable route (the All Red Line)

The Pacific Cable Station was built in 1902 in Southport, Gold Coast City, Queensland, Australia, continuing to operate for sixty years, finally closing in 1962. While most of the site has been dismantled, the Southport Cable Hut remains and has been listed on the Queensland Heritage Register and the Gold Coast Local Heritage Register.

== Early telegraphy in Australia ==
Telegraph communication developed in the mid-19th century as a result of many years of discovery and experimentation in electrical communication culminating in the work of Samuel Morse. The rapid long-distance communication provided by telegraph systems had a major impact on society. The telegraph was quickly utilised by news services; Associated Press and Reuters press service were founded to take advantage of the technology. Telegraph companies soon offered financial services, providing the facility to send money orders via the telegraph.

In Australia the telegraph helped to alleviate the isolation of the colonies. New South Wales, Victoria and South Australia were connected by telegraph by 1860. Queensland's first telegraph connection was made in 1861 between Brisbane and Ipswich. Brisbane was linked to Sydney the same year.

The first telegraph link between Australia and Britain opened in 1872. The link was via the Eastern Cable Company's network. It was routed through Singapore, India, Suez and Gibraltar. It was initially proposed to make landfall in north Queensland. However, the South Australian government successfully negotiated for the link to connect with Adelaide via Port Darwin and an overland route through the centre of Australia.

Before the Pacific Cable was opened, the Eastern Cable Company and its associates maintained a monopoly over international telegraph traffic with Australia. As a result, the cost of communication between Britain and Australia remained very high and beyond the means of most people.

== Planning and construction ==
Pacific Cable Act 1901 (Note: Section 8.)
- Act of Parliament
- Parliament of the United Kingdom
- Long title: An Act to provide for the Construction and Working of a Submarine Cable from the Island of Vancouver to New Zealand and to Queensland.
- Citation: 1 Edw. 7. c. 31
- Territorial extent: United Kingdom

Dates
- Royal assent: 17 August 1901
- Commencement: 17 August 1901 (Note: The Acts of Parliament (Commencement) Act 1793.)
- Repealed: 1 April 1927

Other legislation
- Amended by: Pacific Cable (Amendment) Act 1902; Pacific Cable Act 1911
- Repealed by: Pacific Cable Act 1927
- Relates to: Pacific Cable Act 1924

Status: Repealed

Text of statute as originally enacted

Pacific Cable (Amendment) Act 1902 (Note: Section 2.)
- Act of Parliament
- Parliament of the United Kingdom
- Long title: An Act to substitute the Government of the Commonwealth of Australia for the Governments of the States of New South Wales, Queensland and Victoria in the Pacific Cable Act, 1901.
- Citation: 2 Edw. 7. c. 26
- Territorial extent: United Kingdom

Dates
- Royal assent: 8 August 1902
- Commencement: 8 August 1902
- Repealed: 1 April 1927

Other legislation
- Amends: Pacific Cable Act 1901
- Repealed by: Pacific Cable Act 1927
- Relates to: Pacific Cable Act 1911; Pacific Cable Act 1924

Status: Repealed

Text of statute as originally enacted

Pacific Cable Act 1911 (Note: Section 3)
- Act of Parliament
- Parliament of the United Kingdom
- Long title: An Act to extend the Pacific Cable Act, 1901.
- Citation: 1 & 2 Geo. 5. c. 36
- Territorial extent: United Kingdom

Dates
- Royal assent: 16 December 1911
- Commencement: 16 December 1911
- Repealed: 1 April 1927

Other legislation
- Amends: Pacific Cable Act 1901
- Repealed by: Pacific Cable Act 1927
- Relates to: Pacific Cable (Amendment) Act 1902; Pacific Cable Act 1924

Status: Repealed

Text of statute as originally enacted

Pacific Cable Act 1924
- Act of Parliament
- Parliament of the United Kingdom
- Long title: An Act to extend the powers of the Pacific Cable Board.
- Citation: 14 & 15 Geo. 5. c. 19
- Territorial extent: United Kingdom

Dates
- Royal assent: 14 July 1924
- Commencement: 14 July 1924
- Repealed: 1 April 1927

Other legislation
- Repealed by: Pacific Cable Act 1927
- Relates to: Pacific Cable Act 1901; Pacific Cable (Amendment) Act 1902

Status: Repealed

Text of statute as originally enacted

Sandford Fleming, Chief Engineer of the Canadian Pacific Railway, was an early advocate of an alternative cable route between Australia and Great Britain via Canada and the Pacific Ocean. He expressed his views as early as the Colonial Conference of 1887. A major advantage put forward by Fleming and other proponents of the Pacific route was that it would be more secure in times of war. The existing link passed through countries that were not part of the British Empire. The high cost of telegrams through the Eastern Cable Company's system provided further motivation for a competing route. The proposed Pacific Cable would break the Eastern Cable Company's monopoly and lower the cost of communication between Britain and Australia. When the Pacific Cable opened, the cost of telegrams reduced to less than half the former rate. The ability to communicate directly with the United States and so access more trade opportunities was another argument in favour of the Pacific Cable.

Ensign of Pacific Cable Board

It was proposed that the Pacific Cable would pass only through British dependencies. Approval was given at the Postal and Telegraphic Conference held in Brisbane in 1893. By the mid-1890s, agreement was reached that the cable should be laid. However debate about management of the cable laying project and ownership of the completed cable continued for some years. Finally, it was agreed that funding should be shared between the governments of Britain, Canada, New Zealand and Australia. The Pacific Cable Board was formed in 1896 with representatives from Britain, Canada and Australia. A survey of the route from Vancouver began in 1899. The Pacific Cable Act 1901 (1 Edw. 7. c. 31) gave this board responsibility for managing the project and operating the completed cable and authorized the construction of the cable link between Australia and New Zealand, to the United Kingdom via Canada.

The site of the cable station in Southport was selected by R. E. Peake who was a member of Clarke, Ford and Taylor, the engineering firm responsible for the overall project and tasked with drawing up the plans and specifications of the cable station. Peake arrived in Australia in April 1901 to establish a location for the cable terminus in Australia and, on 30 May 1901, he visited Southport with the Acting Deputy Postmaster General, T. C. Scott. At the same time, a temporary cable station that had been previously constructed in England and dismantled for shipment to Australia was transported to Southport on the Maid of Sker and erected in the beach at Southport to act as a test house and temporary buildings for the equipment. At the end of July it was reported that a three-acre two rood site bordered by Bauer Street, Chester Terrace and Lenneberg Street had been selected for the station buildings. An additional eight-acre site bounded by Brighton Parade and the Nerang River was acquired for the cable landing.

In late 1901 the commonwealth government called for tenders to construct three buildings, including a central building housing the cable and land lines, with facilities for staff, and two separate houses to accommodate the cable superintendent and the land line superintendent. In April 1902, the tender was awarded to E Boyle to construct the wooden buildings within six months for a sum of £4,574 within. By the end of 1902, it was reported that the building to house the cable and land lines was near completion and the instruments housed in the test house on the beach were about to be relocated. The houses to accommodate the superintendents were not as well advanced. The cable station officially opened on 4 November 1902.

== Cable laying ==
The route selected for the cable linked Southport, Norfolk Island, Fiji, Fanning Island, and Vancouver Island. A branch connected to New Zealand. Since cartographers of the day traditionally coloured member countries of the British Empire in red, the route became known as the All Red Route.

Cable laying started in 1902 with two ships, the Anglia and Colonia. They began laying cable from Bamfield, Vancouver Island, Canada, to Fanning Island, Suva, Norfolk Island and Southport, Queensland, Australia. Colonia, built specifically for the project, laid cable from Vancouver Island to Fanning Island in the mid-Pacific. Anglia laid cable from Southport to Norfolk Island, Fiji, New Zealand and Fanning Island.

The Cable Station landfall was at Main Beach, Cable Street passing under the river to the station at Bauer St, Southport. The cable was landed at Southport in March 1902. The Pacific Cable was completed on 31 October 1902 and officially opened at Southport on 3 November 1902 by the Postmaster-General of Australia, the Honourable James Drake; the total cost was around 2 million pounds sterling.

The cable was laid into a trench through the dunes of Narrow Neck near Southport and terminated at a cable hut located close to the beach. From here, it connected to a cable which crossed under the Nerang River to the cable station at Bauer Street.

== Use ==
The first message was sent on 31 October and opened for the public on 7th 1902. It was opened to public traffic on 8 December 1902. Until 1912 Southport handled telegraph traffic for all over Australia. In 1912, a cable from Auckland was extended to Sydney and for a period after this, traffic for the southern States went directly to Sydney from Auckland.

There was only one serious interruption to the service during World War I, in 1914 when the Nurnberg, a German cruiser, cut the cable at Fanning Island.

Technical changes to the system in 1923, including the installation of automatic repeaters, relegated Southport to a repeater station. The Southport station continued to be operated by the Pacific Cable Board until 1932. Management was then taken over by Cable & Wireless.

During World War II, following the raid on Pearl Harbor by the Japanese in December 1941, the Australian authorities, aware of the importance of the cable as the only link Australia had with the United Kingdom other than the Overland Telegraph and Middle East Route, straddling potentially hostile countries and aware of the possibility of enemy action, declared that schools in the Southport area should not open at the beginning of 1942. Some schools were evacuated to country areas. Following success in the Battle of the Coral Sea, it was felt this part of the country was safe from invasion.

In 1946 the Australian Government passed the Overseas Telecommunications Act, passing responsibility of the cable from the Pacific Cable Board to the Overseas Telecommunications Commission (OTC).

In October 1962, the Commonwealth Pacific Cable System (COMPAC) cable between Sydney and Vancouver was completed. The original Pacific Cable was thus rendered redundant and the Southport to Norfolk Island cable was closed. The Cable Station at Bauer Street was sold to De La Salle Brothers who operated a community youth centre there.

In 1964 the property was sold to the de la Salle Brothers. Some of the equipment was used by the University of Newcastle upon Tyne, The Royal Society, R.A.N. and C.I.S.R.O.

== Cable hut ==
Southport Cable Hut
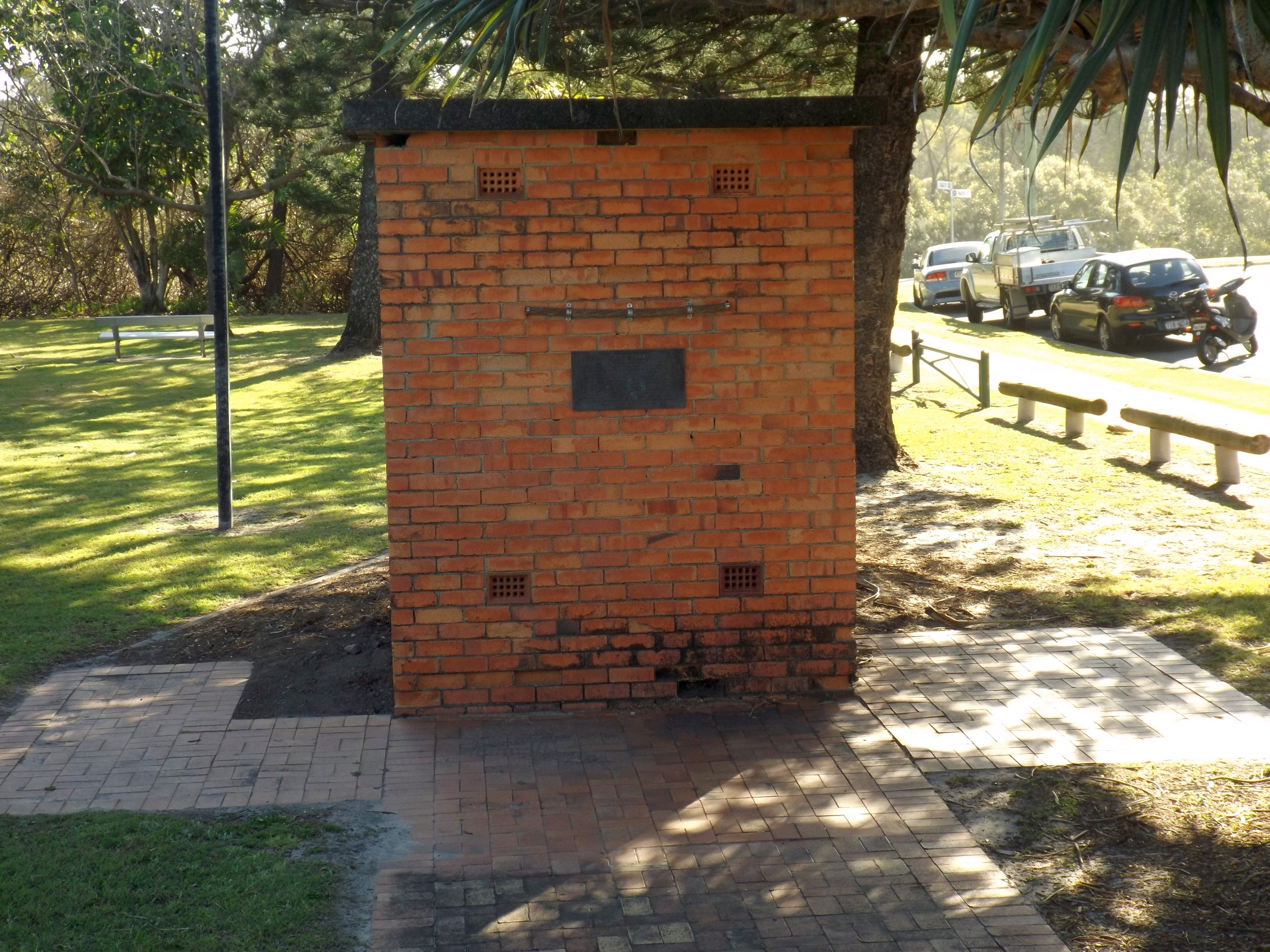
- Structure in 2015

- Location within Queensland Location within Australia
- 27.9836°S 153.4289°E
- Location: Cable Park, Main Beach Parade, Main Beach, Gold Coast City, Queensland, Australia

Queensland Heritage Register
- Official name: Southport Cable Hut (former)
- Type: state heritage (built)
- Designated: 3 May 2007
- Reference no.: 602611
- Significant period: 1950s

Southport Cable Hut is a heritage-listed former telegraph station at Cable Park, Main Beach Parade, Main Beach, Gold Coast City, Queensland, Australia. The brick hut was the Australian terminal of the Pacific cable. By January 1950, the original cable hut located close to the beach at Narrow Neck had gone, leaving only a cement slab and a flag pole partly surrounded by a barbed wire fence. It is believed that it was destroyed in a severe storm. Serious erosion of the cable reserve by February 1951 threatened these remains and the cable connections located there. The current brick hut located at Cable Park was built during the first half of 1951 to remedy this situation.

=== Site description ===
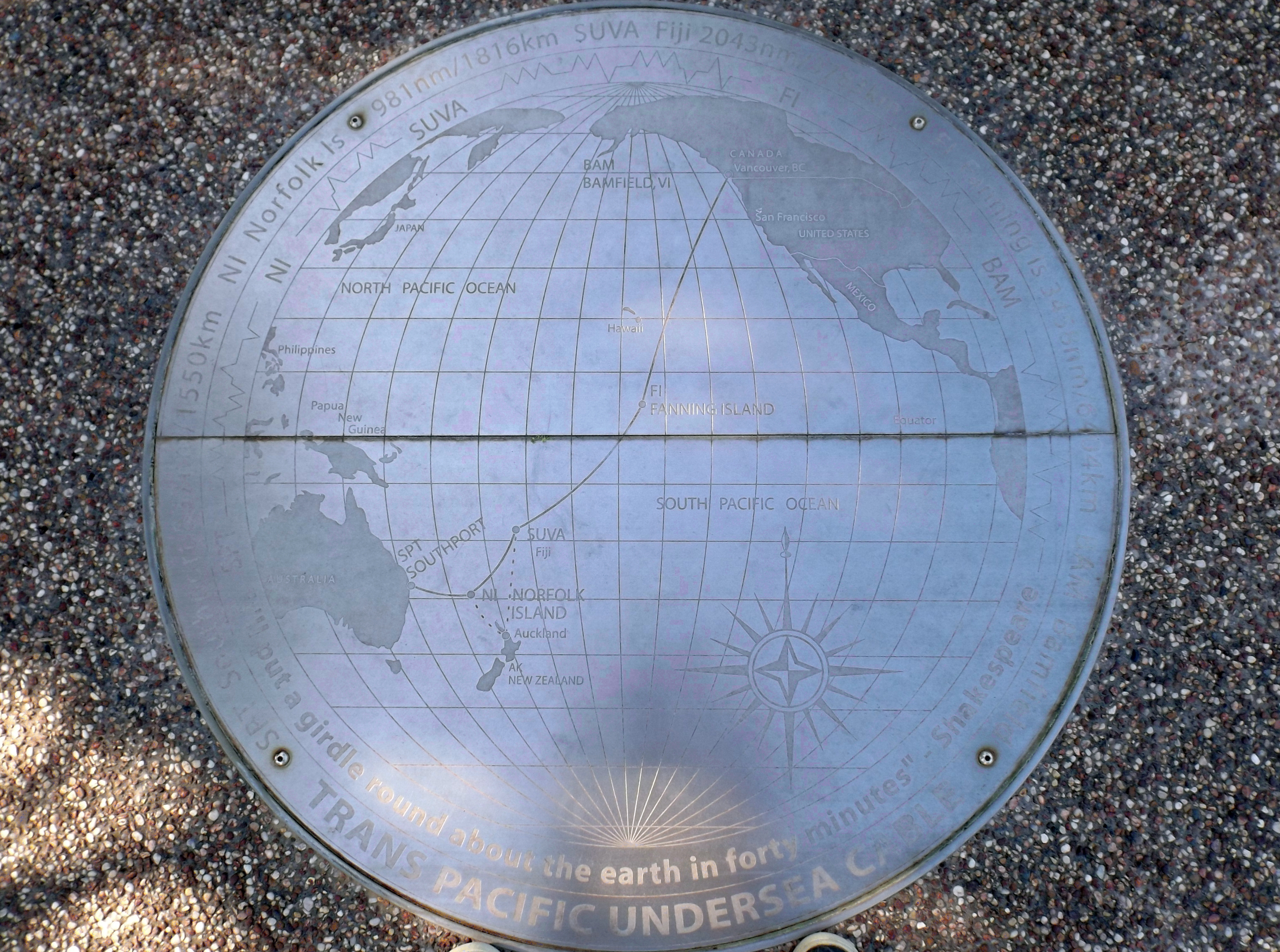
Plaque adjacent to hut, 2015

Cable Park is a small grassy reserve located on Main Beach Parade at Main Beach at the Gold Coast. The Cable Hut is a small brick structure set well back from Main Beach Parade in the park.

The hut is about 2.4 metres (7 ft 10 in) square in plan view and about 2.7 metres (8 ft 10 in) high. There are no windows, airflow being provided by ventilator bricks. It has a flat concrete roof. A plain wooden door, secured by a barrel bolt and padlock, is centered in the northern wall. A section of submarine cable is mounted on the eastern wall above a rectangular brass plaque.

The interior of the hut is unlined and has a wooden floor. The pine skirting boards are of recent construction. Fastened to the wall opposite the door are three groups of cables passing through the floor. These cables run vertically up the wall and are held in place by a long wooden beam extending the length of the wall. The beam is fastened to the brickwork by bolts.

The group at the eastern end of the wall comprises two thick black cables. The outer insulating material of each cable has been removed to a length of about one metre from the end. An inner armoured sheath has been folded back over the outer insulation to expose another layer of insulation. This has been removed to expose three insulated wires. The wires are fixed to the wall on a block of wood.

At the opposite end of the wall is a group of three cables. The insulation and sheathing on one of these cables has been removed in a similar way to the cables mentioned previously. However, only a short length of insulation has been removed from the other two cables.

The third group of cables comprises two grey cables, one considerably thinner than the other. These pass through the floor between the two outer groups about an equal distance from each. The larger of the two cables is fixed with a metal saddle to a rectangular piece of wood fastened to the wall. Just above this, the cable enters a red, rectangular metal box bolted to the wall.

About fourteen smaller grey cables emerge from the top of this box; they are fixed to the wall by a bracket. Above this, twelve of the cables turn and run horizontally to the east, over two rusted metal brackets. Six of the cables are draped over these brackets and hang towards the floor. The other six run further to the left to a point immediately above the two thick cables at the eastern end of the wall. At this point, they turn towards the floor meeting the two cables coming up from the floor. They are fastened to the wall on a block of wood.

Immediately to the west of the red metal box is a wooden panel fixed to the wall. Mounted on this is a large, brass pressure gauge. The thinner of the two grey cables which emerge from the floor is fitted into the bottom of this gauge. Two of the cables which come out of the top of the red metal box turn to the west and curve downwards around the bottom of the wooden panel to enter the gauge at approximately the 'two o'clock' position.

A paved path runs from the eastern side of the hut towards a large raised circular platform. This has an aggregate top and set into this is a round metal plaque. Depicted on the plaque is a map of the world showing the route of the Pacific Cable.

Shrubs and palm trees grow in a small garden bed around the hut. A garden bed of shrubbery runs along the southern and western border of the park.

=== Heritage listing ===
The cable hut was added to the Queensland Heritage Register on 3 May 2007. It was described as having met the following criteria:

- The place is important in demonstrating the evolution or pattern of Queensland's history. The Southport Cable Hut (c. 1951) is important in demonstrating the evolution of Queensland's history insofar that it marks the Australian terminal of the Pacific Cable, Australia's second telegraph link with Great Britain and the first to be government owned. Known as the All Red Route, the Pacific Cable was also the first link between Australia and Britain to pass only through countries of the British empire, by convention coloured red on world maps. The opening of the Pacific Cable in 1902 was an important step forward in international communications for Australia since it resulted in faster, more secure and much more affordable communications between Britain and Australia.
- The place demonstrates rare, uncommon or endangered aspects of Queensland's cultural heritage. The Cable Hut is the only surviving structure associated with the Southport terminal of the Pacific Cable that remains in its original location. Buildings of the former, nearby Cable Station, where communications were received and sent through the Pacific Cable, are extant but have been moved from their original location to the Southport School.
- The place is important in demonstrating the principal characteristics of a particular class of cultural places. The place is important in demonstrating the principal characteristics of cable huts; small buildings where submarine telegraph cables were linked to their terrestrial counterparts. The Southport cable hut is a small, functional structure of simple, robust design. Fastened to the rear wall inside the hut are the ends of the Pacific Cable, the cable link to Sydney and the link to the Cable Station formerly located at Bauer Street, Southport. A gauge and equipment for maintaining gas pressure in the cable to Bauer Street also remain extant in the hut.

== Current use of buildings ==
In the early 1980s the De La Salle Brothers decided to redevelop the area and the Cable Station buildings were removed. Two of the buildings were located to The Southport School where they continue to function as music rooms.

There was a long association between the school and the cable station. C. E. Goff was in charge of the Cable Station trainees, and Mr T. C. Judd an early superintendent encouraged sporting contests between the school and the Cable Station. The major prize for Senior Mathematics was named the Goff Prize in honor and recognition of C. E. Goff. The buildings were divided into 12 sections and moved to The Southport School. Ron Burling, the school architect, re-erected the buildings. The building was reopened at The Southport School on 12 September 1982. The National Trust listed the building because of its historical and architectural significance. In 1983 The Southport School was awarded the John Herbert Award for the relocation and sympathetic restoration of these historic buildings. The buildings are currently being used by The Southport School as their music department and are listed on the Gold Coast Local Heritage Register.
