= Pacific Cable Act 1927 =

Act of the Parliament of the United Kingdom

Pacific Cable Act 1927 (Note: Section 9(1).)
- Act of Parliament
- Parliament of the United Kingdom
- Long title: An Act to consolidate with amendments the Pacific Cable Acts, 1901 to 1924.
- Citation: 17 & 18 Geo. 5. c. 9
- Territorial extent: United Kingdom

Dates
- Royal assent: 29 June 1927
- Commencement: 1 April 1927 (Note: Section 9(2).)
- Repealed: 8 April 1929
Other legislation
Amends	See § Repealed enactments
Repeals/revokes	See § Repealed enactments
Repealed by	Imperial Telegraphs Act 1929

Status: Repealed

Text of statute as originally enacted

The Pacific Cable Act 1927 (17 & 18 Geo. 5. c. 9) was an act of the Parliament of the United Kingdom that consolidated enactments relating to the Pacific Cable Board and the submarine telegraph cables operated by it across the Pacific Ocean.

== Provisions ==
=== Repealed enactments ===
Section 9(3) of the act repealed 4 enactments, listed in the third schedule to the act.

Citation	Short title	Extent of repeal
1 Edw. 7. c. 31	Pacific Cable Act 1901	The whole act.
2 Edw. 7. c. 26	Pacific Cable (Amendment) Act 1902	The whole act.
1 & 2 Geo. 5. c. 36	Pacific Cable Act 1911	The whole act.
14 & 15 Geo. 5. c. 19	Pacific Cable Act 1924	The whole act.

== Subsequent developments ==
Sections 3 to 7 of the act were deemed to have been repealed as from 31 March 1928 by section 1(c) of the Imperial Telegraphs Act 1929 (19 & 20 Geo. 5. c. 7). The whole act was repealed by section 3(1) of that act, which came into force on 8 April 1929.
