= Trade Facilities Act =

The Trade Facilities Acts were a series of acts of the Parliament of the United Kingdom that were designed to alleviate the problem of large scale unemployment in the aftermath of the First World War. Acts were passed in 1921, 1922, 1924, 1925 and 1926 by four successive governments. The acts enabled companies to borrow money, with the capital and interest guaranteed by the government, for projects which would create employment. By the end of the scheme in March 1927, almost £75 million (equivalent to £4 billion in 2025) had been guaranteed to a range of industries. Whether the acts had a significant effect on unemployment has been debated, but one lasting legacy was the funding of the extension and refurbishment of what became the London Underground Northern line.

== Background ==
Following the end of the First World War, Britain saw a short period of economic boom, which then turned into a major recession. The costs of materials and labour were significantly greater than in the pre-war period, and unemployment rose rapidly during 1921. By the end of the year, there were over two million workers registered as unemployed, amounting to 16.9 per cent of the workforce. The British economy had been geared towards exports, particularly to its colonies, but the main industries involved, which included coal, cotton, iron and steel, and shipbuilding failed to pick up, resulting in export levels being around half of what they had been in 1913.

The political parties proposed differing solutions in their election campaigns of the 1920s, but governments of all flavours faced pressure from outside sources. As well as established organisations such as the Bank of England and the Federation of British Industries (FBI), there were new groupings pushing for solutions, including the Empire Development Union, established in 1922, and the Empire Industries Association, which followed in 1924. Major industries and the banks were represented by the Advisory Committee to the Board of Trade, who spoke directly to ministers, while the workers themselves had formed the National Unemployed Workers' Movement in 1921, to organise hunger marches and demonstrations, which were not always peaceful affairs. The Bank of England, in concert with the City of London, industrialists and the Treasury, were adamant that prices needed to be driven down to reverse inflation, and that this required lower taxation and less public spending.

=== Trade Facilities Act 1921 ===
Trade Facilities Act 1921 (Note: Section 3(1).)
- Act of Parliament
- Parliament of the United Kingdom
- Long title: An Act to authorise the Treasury to guarantee the payment of loans to be applied towards the carrying out of capital undertakings, or in the purchase of articles manufactured in the United Kingdom required for the purposes of any such undertakings, and to amend the Overseas Trade (Credits and Insurance) Act, 1920, and the Overseas Trade (Credits and Insurance) Amendment Act, 1921.
- Citation: 11 & 12 Geo. 5. c. 65
- Introduced by: Coalition
- Territorial extent: United Kingdom

Dates
- Royal assent: 10 November 1921
- Commencement: 10 November 1921 (Note: The Acts of Parliament (Commencement) Act 1793.)
- Repealed: 27 June 1974

Other legislation
- Amends: Overseas Trade (Credits and Insurance) Act 1920; Overseas Trade (Credits and Insurance) Amendment Act 1921
- Amended by: Trade Facilities and Loans Guarantee Act 1922; Trade Facilities Act 1924; Trade Facilities Act 1925; Trade Facilities Act 1926; Export Guarantees Act 1937
- Repealed by: Statute Law (Repeals) Act 1974

Status: Repealed

Text of statute as originally enacted

The government were caught between the Treasury, who believed their policies would provide a long-term fix for the economy, and the need to be doing something for the unemployed in the short term, even if that went against the requirement to reduce public spending. The solution proposed by David Lloyd George's Coalition government was enshrined in the Trade Facilities Act 1921 (11 & 12 Geo. 5. c. 65), which offered loans for public works that would provide employment, by guaranteeing the capital and interest. A Trade Facilities Committee was set up, to consider applications under the scheme, but the government instructed the committee to authorise only those schemes which were likely to be a financial success, in the hope that none of the guarantees would be invoked. There were three members of the committee: Sir Robert Kindersley was the chairman and Sir William Plender and George Schuster were members. They could authorise schemes up to a total of £25 million, and in order to placate the Colonial Office, applications could also be made for projects abroad, as well as those at home. It received royal assent on 10 November 1921.

By February 1922, three applications had been granted, for amounts between £100,000 and £1.5 million. A further ten applicants, requesting a total of £14 million, had been notified that their applications would be accepted, while five more applications for a total of £10 million had been considered by the Committee, and the applicants had been notified of the terms under which the committee would recommend a guarantee, for their consideration. The smallest amount requested was just £4,700, while the largest was £6 million, and by 30 September 1922, £22,243,645 had been guaranteed.

=== Trade Facilities and Loans Guarantee Act 1922 ===
Trade Facilities and Loans Guarantee Act 1922 (Note: Section 6(1).)
- Act of Parliament
- Parliament of the United Kingdom
- Long title: An Act to amend section one of the Trade Facilities Act, 1921, and the Overseas Trade Acts, 1920 and 1921, and to authorise the Treasury to guarantee certain loans to be raised by the Government of the Federal Republic of Austria and the Government of the Soudan respectively.
- Citation: 13 Geo. 5 Sess. 2. c. 4
- Introduced by: Conservatives
- Territorial extent: United Kingdom

Dates
- Royal assent: 15 December 1922
- Commencement: 15 December 1922
- Repealed: 16 June 1977

Other legislation
- Amends: Overseas Trade Acts 1920; Overseas Trade Acts 1921; Trade Facilities Act 1921
- Amended by: Trade Facilities Act 1924; Export Guarantees Act 1937; Statute Law Revision Act 1950; Statute Law Revision Act 1963; Statute Law (Repeals) Act 1974
- Repealed by: Statute Law (Repeals) Act 1977

Status: Repealed

Text of statute as originally enacted

In July 1922, the government set up a Cabinet Trade Policy Committee. The Colonial Office explained to the Committee the shortcomings of the existing Trade Facilities Act 1921, which only seemed to offer guarantees to projects in the colonies which could easily have been funded without them. They were pressing for much more substantial aid. The Trade Facilities Committee agreed with them that the guarantees did little to encourage development in the colonies. When these proposals were presented to the cabinet, they prevaricated, postponing any decision, but eventually agreed to double the amount of money that could be guaranteed under the Trade Facilities Act to £50 million, and to extend the period during which applications could be made by one year. The coalition government collapsed on 19 October 1922, and a Conservative government took over, led by Bonar Law. The Trade Policy Committee was replaced by an Unemployment Committee, and as the bill for the revised Trade Facilities Act had not then been drafted, some of the more radical proposals for colonial aid were quietly dropped, though the extensions to the amount of money to be guaranteed and the time period were retained.

By the time the bill was drafted, it had become a container for legislation covering five areas, to be called the Trade Facilities and Loans Guarantee Act 1922 (13 Geo. 5 Sess. 2. c. 4). The first section covered the extensions to the Trade Facilities Act 1921, and was followed by sections on loans to Austria implementing a resolution made by the League of Nations, Treasury guarantees to pay the interest on a loan to the Sudan for irrigation of the Gezireh Plain, amendments to the Overseas Trade (Credits and Insurance) Act 1920 (10 & 11 Geo. 5. c. 29) and Overseas Trade (Credits and Insurance) Amendment Act 1921 (11 & 12 Geo. 5. c. 26), with a final section on how the costs of administering any of the above were to be handled. Lieutenant-Commander Kenworthy, the Member of Parliament for Central Hull raised objections to such a collection, on the basis that there was no option to support one part of the bill but not another. Although his opinion was that this sort of grouping was without precedent, a number of similar collections of disparate legislation were quoted by others. Despite these misgivings, the act received royal assent on 15 December 1922.

=== Trade Facilities Act 1924 ===
Trade Facilities Act 1924 (Note: Section 5.)
- Act of Parliament
- Parliament of the United Kingdom
- Long title: An Act to amend the Trade Facilities Acts, 1921 and 1922, to authorise the Treasury to contribute towards the interest payable on certain loans, the application of which is calculated to promote employment in the United Kingdom, to extend the periods during which guarantees may respectively be given and remain in force under the Overseas Trade Acts, 1920 to 1922, and to amend section three of the Trade Facilities and Loans Guarantee Act, 1922 (Session 2).
- Citation: 14 & 15 Geo. 5. c. 8
- Introduced by: Labour
- Territorial extent: United Kingdom

Dates
- Royal assent: 15 May 1924
- Commencement: 15 May 1924
- Repealed: 16 June 1977

Other legislation
- Amends: Trade Facilities Act 1921; Overseas Trade (Credits and Insurance) Amendment Act 1921; Trade Facilities and Loans Guarantee Act 1922
- Amended by: Export Guarantees Act 1937; Statute Law Revision Act 1950; Statute Law Revision Act 1963
- Repealed by: Statute Law (Repeals) Act 1977

Status: Repealed

Text of statute as originally enacted

Within government, there were two streams of thought as to the role of the colonies. The Colonial Office was convinced that major investment into the colonies would result in them becoming self-sufficient economically, and thus no longer a drain on the British Treasury. Most of their allies saw the colonies as places that could be developed to buy British goods, and thus alleviate domestic unemployment. Philip Lloyd-Greame, the president of the Board of Trade, stated that the only long-term solution to unemployment was the development of new markets for British exports, and that the British Empire was the most likely source of these new markets. As a result of the large numbers of unemployed workers over the winter of 1922-23, Bonar Law asked the Board of Trade to propose new solutions. Their analysis showed that exports were 31 per cent lower than in 1913, when over one third of all exports had been to Europe. They suggested that some £2 million per year should be made available to the Secretary of State for the Colonies, for a period of ten years, to fund development works which would ultimately create the new markets. Amery, the First Lord of the Admiralty, proposed raising this sum to £5 million per year, but the Treasury resisted, on the basis that unemployment was not as bad as it seemed, birth rates were dropping, there was a shortage of domestic servants, and much of the provision of the Trade Facilities and Loans Guarantee Act 1922 remained unclaimed.

The Conservative government was replaced by the first Labour government, led by Ramsay MacDonald, on 22 January 1924, but a bill for a replacement act had already been drafted, and so little changed on this front. When the Trade Facilities Act 1924 (14 & 15 Geo. 5. c. 8) was passed, it included the provision of £1 million to partially fund loan interest for projects in the colonies which would stimulate the demand for British goods and so ease unemployment in Britain. In the three years the scheme operated, only five projects were supported, mainly because the colonies found it too difficult to meet the requirements of the scheme, and total expenditure in Britain amounted to just £500,000. The Trade Facilities and Loans Guarantee Act 1922 had expired on 9 November 1923, at which time between £11 million and £12 million of the original £50 million of guarantees had not been used. The government proposed to add another £15 million to that amount, and extend the deadline for applications to 31 March 1925. The act would also extend the period for guarantees made under the Overseas Trade Acts, 1920 to 1922, and increase the guaranteed amount of the loan to the Sudan made under the 1922 act to £7 million. The act received royal assent on 15 May 1924.

=== Trade Facilities Acts 1925 and 1926 ===
Trade Facilities Act 1925 (Note: Section 2.)
- Act of Parliament
- Parliament of the United Kingdom
- Long title: An Act to amend the Trade Facilities Acts, 1921 to 1924, by increasing the maximum limit of the loans in respect of which guarantees may be given under those Acts and by extending the period within which such guarantees may be given.
- Citation: 15 & 16 Geo. 5. c. 13
- Introduced by: Conservatives
- Territorial extent: United Kingdom

Dates
- Royal assent: 27 March 1925
- Commencement: 27 March 1925
- Repealed: 23 May 1950

Other legislation
- Amends: Trade Facilities Act 1921}
- Repealed by: Statute Law Revision Act 1950

Status: Repealed

Text of statute as originally enacted

Trade Facilities Act 1926 (Note: Section 3.)
- Act of Parliament
- Parliament of the United Kingdom
- Long title: An Act to amend the Trade Facilities Acts, 1921 to 1925, by increasing the maximum limit of the loans in respect of which guarantees may be given under those Acts and by extending the period within which such guarantees may be given, and to extend the periods during which guarantees may respectively be given and remain in force under the Overseas Trade Acts, 1920 to 1924.
- Citation: 16 & 17 Geo. 5. c. 3
- Introduced by: Conservatives
- Territorial extent: United Kingdom

Dates
- Royal assent: 26 March 1926
- Commencement: 26 March 1926
- Repealed: 27 June 1974

Other legislation
- Amends: Trade Facilities Act 1921
- Amended by: Export Guarantees Act 1937
- Repealed by: Statute Law (Repeals) Act 1974

Status: Repealed

Text of statute as originally enacted

The MacDonald government was short-lived, as it lost a vote of censure in October 1924, and the Conservatives returned to power in the ensuing election. Minor adjustments to the terms of the Trade Facilities Act 1924 were made by the Trade Facilities Act 1925 (15 & 16 Geo. 5. c. 13) and the Trade Facilities Act 1926 (16 & 17 Geo. 5. c. 3), but the scheme expired in 1927, and was not revived. Under the Trade Facilities Act 1925, which received royal assent on 27 March, the total amount of guarantees was raised to £70 million and it was raised again by the Trade Facilities Act 1926 to £75 million. By the end of 1925, £63,169,741 had been guaranteed, and it was estimated that the additional amount would be sufficient to cover further guarantees in 1926.

The Trade Facilities Act 1926 again increased the time period for guarantees made under the Overseas Trade Acts, 1920 to 1924. Mr McNeill, speaking to the House of Commons in February 1926, stated that it was difficult to estimate the precise number of people who were now employed as a result of the provisions of the various Trade Facilities Acts, but that it probably exceeded 100,000. The 1926 Act became law on 26 March 1926. There were attempts to revive the concept of the acts in 1927 and 1929, championed by industrialists and some ministers, in order to fund industrial reconstruction, but both attempts failed, due to the reluctance of the government to become involved in the fate of specific industries.

== Effectiveness ==
The Trade Facilities Act 1926 lapsed on 31 March 1927. Shortly afterwards, Winston Churchill summarised how the total of £74,251,780 guaranteed under the five acts had been allocated, by industry.

Trade	Guaranteed	Per cent
Shipbuilding	21,640,585	29.1
Railways Construction and Equipment (Electrical)	12,583,000	17.0
Railways Construction and Equipment (Other)	6,230,000	8.4
Electrical (Hydro Electric)	7,000,000	9.5
Electrical (Generation, Distribution and Traction)	8,004,600	10.8
Coal Mining	4,291,000	5.8
Paper and Pulp Manufacture	2,535,000	3.4
Dock Extensions, Quays and additional Harbour Facilities	3,375,345	4.5
Sugar Beet Factories	2,420,000	3.2
Chemical Works	2,000,000	2.7
Iron, Steel and Engineering	1,161,050	1.6
Miscellaneous	3,011,200	4.0

While the effects of the Trade Facilities Acts on levels of unemployment were disappointing, and an analysis of its effects on the shipbuilding industry suggest that they were at best contentious, there were some benefits to the scheme, which are still being enjoyed by Londoners. In 1921 Lord Ashfield, by then chairman of the Underground Electric Railways Company of London, submitted an application for guarantees to enable parts of the London Underground to be extended and upgraded. He needed £5 million to construct tunnels to join the Hampstead Tube at Camden Town to the City and South London Railway at Euston, to build an extension northwards from Golders Green to Edgware, to enlarge the tunnels between Euston and Clapham, and to purchase 250 new cars to equip the extended railway, which subsequently became the Northern line in 1937. Private funding by that time was not an option, as the interest on loans was around 5.5 per cent, and the deep tube lines were only generating a 2 per cent return, even in good times.

The guarantees enabled money to be raised by issuing 4.5 per cent debenture stock, which was a cheaper way of raising capital than conventional loans. When the original scheme was extended by the Trade Facilities and Loans Guarantee Act 1922, Lord Ashfield applied for more guarantees, to fund more extensions to the future Northern line. The Hampstead Tube and the City and South London Railway were linked at the southern end, by constructing new tunnels from Charing Cross (now Embankment) to Kennington, and the line was extended by tunnelling southwards from Clapham Common to Morden, where a new depot for stabling the trains was constructed. The number of cars expanded from 250 to 521. When John Moore-Brabazon, the junior Transport Minister, opened the extension to Morden on 13 September 1926, he said that further tube extensions would only be possible if the system was well-used and earned the required dividends. Ashfield said that this would require 14 million extra passengers, but knew that it was never likely to happen. The evidence also appeared obvious to some Members of Parliament. Arthur Comyns Carr, speaking in early 1924 about the extension to Edgware, said that he expected the Treasury to have to pay out on the guarantees in due course, as such projects rarely if ever paid their way. Since the price of land along the new routes always rose significantly he suggested that the railway could have financed itself by using this increase as security. Days later, Sir Robert Horne said that some £14 million had been guaranteed for improvements to the tube railways, and that these projects would not have begun without the promise of cheaper loans, as a result of the acts. He recommended that the 1924 Act should be adopted, because the tube extensions funded by the previous acts had provided employment for thousands of men.

== Bibliography ==
- Bruce, J Graeme (1968). Tube Trains Under London. London Transport Board.
- Constantine, Stephen (1984). The Making of British Colonial Development Policy 1914-1940. Frank Cass. ISBN 978-0-7146-3204-9.
- Garside, W R (2002). British Unemployment 1919-1939: A Study in Public Policy. Cambridge University Press. ISBN 978-0-521-89254-4.
- Johnman, Lewis; Murphy, Hugh (4 March 2008). "Subsidy and Treasury: the Trade Facilities Act and the UK Shipbuilding Industry in the 1920s". Contemporary British History. 22: 89–110. doi:10.1080/13619460601065867. S2CID 154875131.
- Lee, Charles E (1967). Sixty Years of the Northern. London Transport Executive. ISBN 978-0-85329-013-1.
- Wolmar, Christian (2004). The Subterranean Railway. Atlantic Books. ISBN 978-1-84354-022-9.
