= London Underground tube-gauge steam locomotives =

Tube-gauge steam locomotives may appear to be an unlikely possibility, because of the problems of using such a machine in the confines of a tunnel less than 12-foot (3.7 m) in diameter, but the London Underground had three such vehicles over the years. Two were built by the Hunslet Engine Company in 1899, and the third by Kerr, Stuart and Company in 1922.

== Central London Railway ==
Central London Railway 1 & 2
Type and origin
- Power type: Steam
- Builder: Hunslet Engine Company
- Build date: 1899
- Total produced: 2
Specifications
- Configuration
  - Whyte: 0-6-0T
- Gauge: 4 ft 8 1/2 in (1,435 mm)
- Driver dia.: 3 ft 3 in (0.99 m)
- Minimum curve: 150 feet (46 m)
- Wheelbase: 17 feet (5.2 m)
- Fuel type: Oil or Coal
Performance figures
- Power output: 12,300 lbf (55 kN)
Career
- Operators: Central London Railway
- Withdrawn: 1923
- Disposition: Both scrapped

The Central London Railway obtained two small steam 0-6-0T locomotives from the Hunslet Engine Company in 1899, to assist with the task of equipping the tunnels once the civil engineering work of building them had been completed. Numbered 1 and 2, only their outer wheels had flanges, which enabled them to negotiate curves of 150 feet (46 m) radius. They appeared to have very large side tanks, but of the 1,250 imperial gallons (5,700 L) of water carried, only one fifth was used for feeding the boiler, and the rest for condensing the steam. Boiler pressure was 150 psi (10 bar), which gave them a tractive effort of 12,300 lbf (55 kN).

Although the cabs were wide, headroom was extremely limited, and consequently they were oil-fired, so that they could be operated by one man rather than two. Fuel tanks holding 50 imperial gallons (230 L) of oil were fitted into the bunker, which could also hold 0.75 tons of coal, since the grate was designed so that either fuel could be used. Oil was always used in the tunnels, but coal was often used above ground. Once the railway opened to passengers in July 1900, the locomotives were seldom used in the tunnels, but did occasionally go into them. They were mainly used for shunting in depots and for moving coal wagons at Wood Lane power station, which operated until March 1928. However the two locomotives were scrapped in 1923.

== City and South London Railway ==
L34
Type and origin
- Power type: Steam
- Builder: Kerr, Stuart and Company
- Build date: 1922
Specifications
- Configuration
  - Whyte: 0-4-2ST
- Gauge: 4 ft 8 1/2 in (1,435 mm)
- Driver dia.: 2 ft 6 in (0.76 m)
- Fuel type: Coal
Performance figures
- Power output: 6,500 lbf (29 kN)
Career
- Operators: City and South London Railway
- Scrapped: 1949

The City and South London Railway was built with tunnels of only 10 ft 6 in (3.20 m) diameter, but they were enlarged between 1923 and 1925, when the line amalgamated with the Charing Cross, Euston and Hampstead Railway. At the same time, the line was extended southwards to Morden, and the railway bought an 0-4-2ST from Kerr, Stuart and Company in 1922, to assist with the equipping of the extension. The machine weighed 14 tons, the saddle tank held 270 imperial gallons (1,200 L) of water, and 0.75 tons of coal could be carried. The driving wheels were 30 inches (0.76 m) in diameter, and it was considerably less powerful than the Central London machines, generating a tractive effort of 6,500 lbf (29 kN). The boiler pressure was 160 psi (11 bar), and it was known as the 'Brazil'. Kerr, Stuart built a number of Brazil class locomotives, of which four 2 ft 6 in (762 mm)-gauge examples survive in preservation, three on the Sittingbourne and Kemsley Light Railway and one on the Great Whipsnade Railway.

The locomotive became L34 in 1930, and worked on the extension of the Piccadilly line to Cockfosters. During this work it was stabled at either Cockfosters or Arnos Grove. It then moved to Drapers Field, Leyton, to work on the Central line eastern extension. This work was completed in 1949, and the locomotive was then scrapped.
