= List of acts of the Parliament of the United Kingdom from 1924 =

This is a complete list of acts of the Parliament of the United Kingdom for the year 1924.

Note that the first parliament of the United Kingdom was held in 1801; parliaments between 1707 and 1800 were either parliaments of Great Britain or of Ireland). For acts passed up until 1707, see the list of acts of the Parliament of England and the list of acts of the Parliament of Scotland. For acts passed from 1707 to 1800, see the list of acts of the Parliament of Great Britain. See also the list of acts of the Parliament of Ireland.

For acts of the devolved parliaments and assemblies in the United Kingdom, see the list of acts of the Scottish Parliament, the list of acts of the Northern Ireland Assembly, and the list of acts and measures of Senedd Cymru; see also the list of acts of the Parliament of Northern Ireland.

The number shown after each act's title is its chapter number. Acts passed before 1963 are cited using this number, preceded by the year(s) of the reign during which the relevant parliamentary session was held; thus the Union with Ireland Act 1800 is cited as "39 & 40 Geo. 3 c. 67", meaning the 67th act passed during the session that started in the 39th year of the reign of George III and which finished in the 40th year of that reign. Note that the modern convention is to use Arabic numerals in citations (thus "41 Geo. 3" rather than "41 Geo. III"). Acts of the last session of the Parliament of Great Britain and the first session of the Parliament of the United Kingdom are both cited as "41 Geo. 3". Acts passed from 1963 onwards are simply cited by calendar year and chapter number.

== 14 & 15 Geo. 5 ==
The 33rd Parliament of the United Kingdom, which met from 8 January 1924 until 9 October 1924.

This session was also traditionally cited as 14 & 15 G. 5.

=== Public general acts ===
Short title	Citation	Royal assent
Long title
Unemployment Insurance Act 1924 (repealed)	14 & 15 Geo. 5. c. 1	21 February 1924
An Act to repeal proviso (2) to section two of the Unemployment Insurance Act, 1923. (Note: Unemployment Insurance Act 1923 (13 & 14 Geo. 5. c. 2)) (Repealed by Unemployment Insurance (No. 2) Act 1924 (14 & 15 Geo. 5. c. 30))
Consolidated Fund (No. 1) Act 1924 (repealed)	14 & 15 Geo. 5. c. 2	6 March 1924
An Act to apply a sum out of the Consolidated Fund to the service of the year-ending on the thirty-first day of March, one thousand nine hundred and twenty-four. (Repealed by Statute Law Revision Act 1950 (14 Geo. 6. c. 6))
Diseases of Animals Act 1924 (repealed)	14 & 15 Geo. 5. c. 3	6 March 1924
An Act to remove temporarily the limit on the moneys provided by Parliament for the purposes of the Diseases of Animals Acts, 1894 to 1922. (Repealed by Local Government Act 1929 (19 & 20 Geo. 5. c. 17))
Consolidated Fund (No. 2) Act 1924 (repealed)	14 & 15 Geo. 5. c. 4	28 March 1924
An Act to apply certain sums out of the Consolidated Fund to the service of the years ending on the thirty-first day of March, one thousand nine hundred and twenty-three, one thousand nine hundred and twenty-four, and one thousand nine hundred and twenty-five. (Repealed by Statute Law Revision Act 1950 (14 Geo. 6. c. 6))
Army and Air Force (Annual) Act 1924 (repealed)	14 & 15 Geo. 5. c. 5	15 April 1924
An Act to provide, during Twelve Months, for the Discipline and Regulation of the Army and Air Force. (Repealed by Statute Law Revision Act 1950 (14 Geo. 6. c. 6), Statute Law Revision Act 1953 (2 & 3 Eliz. 2. c. 5) and Revision of the Army and Air Force Acts (Transitional Provisions) Act 1955 (3 & 4 Eliz. 2. c. 20))
Unemployment Insurance (No. 3) Act 1924 (repealed)	14 & 15 Geo. 5. c. 6	15 April 1924
An Act to extend the periods for which the receipt of unemployment benefit during the current benefit year may be authorised under section two of the Unemployment Insurance Act, 1923. (Repealed by Unemployment Insurance Act 1927 (17 & 18 Geo. 5. c. 30))
Treaty of Peace (Turkey) Act 1924 (repealed)	14 & 15 Geo. 5. c. 7	15 April 1924
An Act to carry into effect a Treaty of Peace between His Majesty and certain other Powers, and certain conventions, protocols, and declarations connected therewith. (Repealed by Statute Law Revision Act 1966 (c. 5))
Trade Facilities Act 1924 (repealed)	14 & 15 Geo. 5. c. 8	15 May 1924
An Act to amend the Trade Facilities Acts, 1921 (Note: Trade Facilities Act 1921 (11 & 12 Geo. 5. c. 65)) and 1922, (Note: Trade Facilities and Loans Guarantee Act 1922 (13 Geo. 5 Sess. 2. c. 4)) to authorise the Treasury to contribute towards the interest payable on certain loans, the application of which is calculated to promote employment in the United Kingdom, to extend the periods during which guarantees may respectively be given and remain in force under the Overseas Trade Acts, 1920 to 1922, and to amend section three of the Trade Facilities and Loans Guarantee Act, 1922 (Session 2). (Repealed by Statute Law (Repeals) Act 1977 (c. 18))
Poor Law Emergency Provisions Continuance (Scotland) Act 1924 (repealed)	14 & 15 Geo. 5. c. 9	15 May 1924
An Act to extend further the duration of the Poor Law Emergency Provisions (Scotland) Act, 1921, (Note: Poor Law Emergency Provisions (Scotland) Act 1921 (11 & 12 Geo. 5. c. 64)) and to amend certain provisions of that Act as amended by the Local Authorities (Emergency Provisions) Act, 1923. (Note: Local Authorities (Emergency Provisions) Act 1923 (13 & 14 Geo. 5. c. 6)) (Repealed by National Assistance Act 1948 (11 & 12 Geo. 6. c. 29))
National Health Insurance (Cost of Medical Benefit) Act 1924 (repealed)	14 & 15 Geo. 5. c. 10	29 May 1924
An Act to make further provision with respect to the cost of medical benefit and to the expenses of the administration of benefits under the Acts relating to national health insurance, and to amend section twenty-nine of the National Health Insurance Act, 1918, (Note: National Health Insurance Act 1918 (7 & 8 Geo. 5. c. 62)) and for purposes connected therewith. (Repealed by Statute Law Revision Act 1950 (14 Geo. 6. c. 6))
Friendly Societies Act 1924 (repealed)	14 & 15 Geo. 5. c. 11	29 May 1924
An Act to amend sections one, sixty-two and sixty-five of the Friendly Societies Act, 1896, (Note: Friendly Societies Act 1896 (59 & 60 Vict. c. 25)) and for purposes connected therewith. (Repealed by Friendly Societies Act 1974 (c. 46))
School Teachers (Superannuation) Act 1924 (repealed)	14 & 15 Geo. 5. c. 12	29 May 1924
An Act to extend the period during which contributions under the School Teachers (Superannuation) Act, 1922, (Note: School Teachers (Superannuation) Act 1922 (12 & 13 Geo. 5. c. 42)) are to be payable. (Repealed by Statute Law Revision Act 1950 (14 Geo. 6. c. 6))
Education (Scotland) (Superannuation) Act 1924 (repealed)	14 & 15 Geo. 5. c. 13	29 May 1924
An Act to amend the Education (Scotland) (Superannuation) Act, 1922. (Note: Education (Scotland) (Superannuation) Act 1922 (12 & 13 Geo. 5. c. 48)) (Repealed by Education (Scotland) Act 1946 (9 & 10 Geo. 6. c. 72))
West Indian Islands (Telegraph) Act 1924 (repealed)	14 & 15 Geo. 5. c. 14	14 July 1924
An Act to make provision for the establishment and working of a system of submarine cables and wireless telegraph stations in the West Indian Islands and British Guiana. (Repealed by Imperial Telegraphs Act 1929 (19 & 20 Geo. 5. c. 7))
Auxiliary Air Force and Air Force Reserve Act 1924 (repealed)	14 & 15 Geo. 5. c. 15	14 July 1924
An Act to make further provision as to the organisation and conditions of service of the Auxiliary Air Force and Air Force Reserve, and for purposes connected therewith. (Repealed by Statute Law (Repeals) Act 1976 (c. 16))
Small Debt (Scotland) Act 1924 (repealed)	14 & 15 Geo. 5. c. 16	14 July 1924
An Act to amend the law of Scotland relating to payment by instalments of sums decerned for in small debt courts, and to the arrestment of wages. (Repealed by Statute Law (Repeals) Act 1981 (c. 19))
County Courts Act 1924 (repealed)	14 & 15 Geo. 5. c. 17	14 July 1924
An Act to amend the law relating to Officers of County Courts in England and of District Registries of the High Court in England, and to make further provision with respect to such County Courts and proceedings therein, and for purposes connected therewith. (Repealed by Senior Courts Act 1981 (c. 54))
Prevention of Eviction Act 1924 (repealed)	14 & 15 Geo. 5. c. 18	14 July 1924
An Act to prevent unreasonable eviction of tenants. (Repealed for England and Wales by Rent Act 1968 (c. 23) and for Scotland by Rent (Scotland) Act 1971 (c. 28))
Pacific Cable Act 1924 (repealed)	14 & 15 Geo. 5. c. 19	14 July 1924
An Act to extend the powers of the Pacific Cable Board. (Repealed by Pacific Cable Act 1927 (17 & 18 Geo. 5. c. 9))
Marriages Validity (Provisional Orders) Act 1924	14 & 15 Geo. 5. c. 20	14 July 1924
An Act to amend the Provisional Order (Marriages) Act, 1905. (Note: Provisional Order (Marriages) Act 1905 (5 Edw. 7. c. 23))
Finance Act 1924 (repealed)	14 & 15 Geo. 5. c. 21	1 August 1924
An Act to grant certain Duties of Customs and Inland Revenue (including Excise), to alter other Duties, and to amend the Law relating to Customs and Inland Revenue (including Excise) and the National Debt, and to make further provision in connection with Finance. (Repealed for England and Wales by Regulatory Reform (Game) Order 2007 (SI 2007/2007) and for Scotland by Wildlife and Natural Environment (Scotland) Act 2011 (asp 6))
Carriage of Goods by Sea Act 1924 (repealed)	14 & 15 Geo. 5. c. 22	1 August 1924
An Act to amend the law with respect to the carriage of goods by sea. (Repealed by Carriage of Goods by Sea Act 1971 (c. 19))
British Museum Act 1924 (repealed)	14 & 15 Geo. 5. c. 23	1 August 1924
An Act to enable the Trustees of the British Museum to make loans of objects comprised in the collections of the British Museum for public exhibition, and to make regulations for that purpose. (Repealed by British Museum Act 1963 (c. 24))
Isle of Man (Customs) Act 1924 (repealed)	14 & 15 Geo. 5. c. 24	1 August 1924
An Act to amend the law with respect to Customs in the Isle of Man. (Repealed for the Isle of Man by the Customs and Excise etc. Order 1976 (GC No 1/76))
Telegraph (Money) Act 1924 (repealed)	14 & 15 Geo. 5. c. 25	1 August 1924
An Act to provide for raising further Money for the purpose of the Telegraph Acts, 1863 to 1922, and to make provision with respect to the application of sums arising from the sale of property acquired for the purposes of the telephonic system. (Repealed by Post Office and Telegraph (Money) Act 1955 (4 & 5 Eliz. 2. c. 14))
Public Works Loans Act 1924 (repealed)	14 & 15 Geo. 5. c. 26	1 August 1924
An Act to grant money for the purpose of certain Local Loans out of the Local Loans Fund, and for other purposes relating to Local Loans. (Repealed by Statute Law Revision Act 1950 (14 Geo. 6. c. 6))
Conveyancing (Scotland) Act 1924	14 & 15 Geo. 5. c. 27	1 August 1924
An Act to amend the Law of Conveyancing in Scotland.
Government of India (Leave of Absence) Act 1924 (repealed)	14 & 15 Geo. 5. c. 28	1 August 1924
An Act to make provision with respect to leave of absence from India of the Governor-General, Commander-in-Chief, Governors and members of Executive Councils, and with respect to the appointment of Commander-in-Chief. (Repealed by Government of India Act 1935 (26 Geo. 5 & 1 Edw. 8. c. 2))
Local Authorities (Emergency Provisions) Act 1924 (repealed)	14 & 15 Geo. 5. c. 29	1 August 1924
An Act to extend the duration of the Local Authorities (Emergency Provisions) Act, 1923. (Repealed by Local Government Act 1933 (23 & 24 Geo. 5. c. 51) and Statute Law Revision Act 1950 (14 Geo. 6. c. 6))
Unemployment Insurance (No. 2) Act 1924 (repealed)	14 & 15 Geo. 5. c. 30	1 August 1924
An Act to amend the Unemployment Insurance Acts, 1920 to 1924. (Repealed by Unemployment Insurance Act 1935 (25 & 26 Geo. 5. c. 8))
Appropriation Act 1924 (repealed)	14 & 15 Geo. 5. c. 31	7 August 1924
An Act to apply a sum out of the Consolidated Fund to the service of the year ending on the thirty-first day of March one thousand nine hundred and twenty-five, and to appropriate the Supplies granted in this Session of Parliament. (Repealed by Statute Law Revision Act 1950 (14 Geo. 6. c. 6))
Pensions (Increase) Act 1924 (repealed)	14 & 15 Geo. 5. c. 32	7 August 1924
An Act to raise the percentages by which certain pensions may be increased under the Pensions (Increase) Act, 1920, (Note: Pensions (Increase) Act 1920 (10 & 11 Geo. 5. c. 36)) to permit the payment of increased pensions under the said Act to pensioners residing outside the British Islands, and to require police, local and other public authorities to increase pensions granted by them up to the maximum amount authorised by the said Act. (Repealed by Pensions (Increase) Act 1971 (c. 56))
Old Age Pensions Act 1924 (repealed)	14 & 15 Geo. 5. c. 33	7 August 1924
An Act to amend paragraph (3) of section two of the Old Age Pensions Act, 1908. (Note: Old Age Pensions Act 1908 (8 Edw. 7. c. 40)) (Repealed by Old Age Pensions Act 1936 (26 Geo. 5 & 1 Edw. 8. c. 31))
London Traffic Act 1924 (repealed)	14 & 15 Geo. 5. c. 34	7 August 1924
An Act to make provision for the control and regulation of traffic in and near London, and for purposes connected therewith. (Repealed by Road Traffic Act 1960 (8 & 9 Eliz. 2. c. 16))
Housing (Financial Provisions) Act 1924 or the Wheatley Act (repealed)	14 & 15 Geo. 5. c. 35	7 August 1924
An Act to amend the financial provisions of the Housing, &c. Act, 1923, (Note: Housing, &c. Act 1923 (13 & 14 Geo. 5. c. 24)) and for other purposes incidental thereto or connected therewith. (Repealed by Statute Law (Repeals) Act 1981 (c. 19))
Local Authorities Loans (Scotland) Act 1924 (repealed)	14 & 15 Geo. 5. c. 36	7 August 1924
An Act to amend the Local Authorities Loans (Scotland) Acts, 1891 (Note: Local Authorities Loans (Scotland) Act 1891 (54 & 55 Vict. c. 34)) and 1893. (Note: Local Authorities Loans (Scotland) Act 1891, Amendment Act 1893 (56 & 57 Vict. c. 8)) (Repealed by Local Government (Scotland) Act 1947 (10 & 11 Geo. 6. c. 43))
Agricultural Wages (Regulation) Act 1924 (repealed)	14 & 15 Geo. 5. c. 37	7 August 1924
An Act to provide for the Regulation of Wages of Workers in Agriculture, and for purposes incidental thereto. (Repealed by Agricultural Wages Act 1948 (11 & 12 Geo. 6. c. 47))
National Health Insurance Act 1924 (repealed)	14 & 15 Geo. 5. c. 38	7 August 1924
An Act to consolidate the enactments relating to National Health Insurance. (Repealed by National Health Insurance Act 1936 (26 Geo. 5 & 1 Edw. 8. c. 32))
Arbitration Clauses (Protocol) Act 1924 (repealed)	14 & 15 Geo. 5. c. 39	7 August 1924
An Act to give effect to a Protocol on arbitration clauses signed on behalf of His Majesty at a meeting of the Assembly of the League of Nations held on the twenty-fourth day of September, nineteen hundred and twenty-three. (Repealed by Arbitration Act 1950 (14 Geo. 6. c. 27))
Workmen's Compensation (Silicosis) Act 1924 (repealed)	14 & 15 Geo. 5. c. 40	7 August 1924
An Act to amend the Workmen's Compensation (Silicosis) Act, 1918. (Note: Workmen's Compensation (Silicosis) Act 1918 (8 & 9 Geo. 5. c. 14)) (Repealed by Workmen's Compensation Act 1925 (15 & 16 Geo. 5. c. 84))
Irish Free State (Confirmation of Agreement) Act 1924 (repealed)	14 & 15 Geo. 5. c. 41	9 October 1924
An Act to confirm a certain Agreement supplementing Article Twelve of the Articles of Agreement for a Treaty between Great Britain and Ireland to which the force of law was given by the Irish Free State (Agreement) Act, 1922, (Note: Irish Free State (Agreement) Act 1922 (12 & 13 Geo. 5. c. 4)) and by the Constitution of the Irish Free State (Saorstát Eireann) Act, 1922. (Note: Constitution of the Irish Free State (Saorstát Eireann) Act 1922 (No. 1 (RoI))) (Repealed by Statute Law Revision Act 1953 (2 & 3 Eliz. 2. c. 5))

=== Local acts ===
Short title	Citation	Royal assent
Long title
Kirkcaldy and Dysart Water Order Confirmation Act 1924 (repealed)	14 & 15 Geo. 5. c. i	21 February 1924
An Act to confirm a Provisional Order under the Private Legislation Procedure (Scotland) Act 1899 (Note: Private Legislation Procedure (Scotland) Act 1899 (62 & 63 Vict. c. 47)) relating to Kirkcaldy and Dysart Water. (Repealed by Kirkcaldy Corporation Order Confirmation Act 1939 (2 & 3 Geo. 6. c. vi))
	Kirkcaldy and Dysart Water Order 1924 Provisional Order to authorise the Waterworks Commissioners of Kirkcaldy and Dysart to make and maintain additional works for providing an increased water supply and for other purposes.	
Aberdeen Harbour Order Confirmation Act 1924 (repealed)	14 & 15 Geo. 5. c. ii	21 February 1924
An Act to confirm a Provisional Order under the Private Legislation Procedure (Scotland) Act 1899 relating to Aberdeen Harbour. (Repealed by Aberdeen Harbour Order Confirmation Act 1960 (9 & 10 Eliz. 2. c. i))
	Aberdeen Harbour Order 1924 Provisional Order to confer further powers upon the Aberdeen Harbour Commissioners.	
Whitehills Harbour Order Confirmation Act 1924	14 & 15 Geo. 5. c. iii	28 March 1924
An Act to confirm a Provisional Order under the Private Legislation Procedure (Scotland) Act 1899 relating to Whitehills Harbour.
	Whitehills Harbour Order 1924 Provisional Order for increasing certain rates and charges leviable by the Whitehills Harbour Commissioners and for authorising the Commissioners to levy new or substituted rates and charges.	
Leith Harbour and Docks Order Confirmation Act 1924 (repealed)	14 & 15 Geo. 5. c. iv	28 March 1924
An Act to confirm a Provisional Order under the Private Legislation Procedure (Scotland) Act 1899 relating to Leith Harbour and Docks. (Repealed by Statute Law (Repeals) Act 1998 (c. 43))
	Leith Harbour and Docks Order 1924 Provisional Order to extend the time for the compulsory purchase of lands authorised by the Leith Harbour and Docks Act 1913 (Note: Leith Harbour and Docks Act 1913 (3 & 4 Geo. 5. c. lxxxvii)) and the Leith Harbour and Docks Order 1919 to make further provision with respect to rates borrowing powers and sinking fund and for other purposes.	
Chatham and District Light Railways Company Act 1924 (repealed)	14 & 15 Geo. 5. c. v	15 April 1924
An Act to enable the Chatham and District Light Railways Company to make provision for the repayment and extinguishment of their preference capital. (Repealed by Chatham and District Traction Act 1955 (4 & 5 Eliz. 2. c. xiv))
Birkenhead Corporation (Ferries) Act 1924	14 & 15 Geo. 5. c. vi	15 April 1924
An Act to relieve the corporation of Birkenhead from the obligation to maintain a service of steamers between New Ferry and Liverpool.
Bombay, Baroda and Central India Railway Act 1924 (repealed)	14 & 15 Geo. 5. c. vii	15 May 1924
An Act to amend the Bombay Baroda and Central India Railway Act 1906 (Note: Bombay, Baroda and Central India Railway Act 1906 (6 Edw. 7. c. lix)) and for other purposes. (Repealed by Statute Law (Repeals) Act 2013 (c. 2))
Queen's Ferry Bridge Act 1924 (repealed)	14 & 15 Geo. 5. c. viii	15 May 1924
An Act to authorise the construction of a bridge over the River Dee at Queen's Ferry and the removal of the existing bridge and for other purposes. (Repealed by Clwyd County Council Act 1985 (c. xliv))
St. Just (Falmouth) Ocean Wharves and Railways (Abandonment) Act 1924	14 & 15 Geo. 5. c. ix	29 May 1924
An Act to provide for the abandonment of the works authorised by the St. Just (Falmouth) Ocean Wharves and Railways Act 1919 (Note: St. Just (Falmouth) Ocean Wharves and Railways Act 1919 (9 & 10 Geo. 5. c. cxx)) and for other purposes.
Rawtenstall Corporation Act 1924	14 & 15 Geo. 5. c. x	29 May 1924
An Act to empower the mayor aldermen and burgesses of the borough of Rawtenstall to provide and work omnibuses to make further provision with regard to the tramways and electricity undertakings of the Corporation and the local government and improvement of the borough to consolidate the local rates leviable in the borough and for other purposes.
London, Midland and Scottish Railway Order Confirmation Act 1924	14 & 15 Geo. 5. c. xi	29 May 1924
An Act to confirm a Provisional Order under the Private Legislation Procedure (Scotland) Act 1899 relating to the London Midland and Scottish Railway.
	London, Midland and Scottish Railway Order 1924 Provisional Order to authorise the London Midland and Scottish Railway Company to acquire lands to confirm the purchase of other lands already acquired by the Company to extend the time for the completion of certain authorised works and for the purchase of lands and for other purposes.	
St. Andrews Links Order Confirmation Act 1924 (repealed)	14 & 15 Geo. 5. c. xii	29 May 1924
An Act to confirm a Provisional Order under the Private Legislation Procedure (Scotland) Act 1899 relating to St. Andrews Links. (Repealed by St. Andrews Links Order Confirmation Act 1974 (c. iii))
	St. Andrews Links Order 1924 Provisional Order to empower the Town Council of St. Andrews to dispose of part of the links of St. Andrews to sanction and confirm an Agreement between the Town Council and the Royal and Ancient Golf Club of St. Andrews and for other purposes.	
Ministry of Health Provisional Orders Confirmation (No. 1) Act 1924	14 & 15 Geo. 5. c. xiii	14 July 1924
An Act to confirm certain Provisional Orders of the Minister of Health relating to Bradford Coventry Isle of Thanet Joint Hospital Board Stafford Swansea and Whitstable.
	Bradford Order 1924 Provisional Order for altering the Bradford Corporation Act 1866. (Note: Bradford Corporation Act 1866 (29 & 30 Vict. c. ccxxii))	
	Coventry Order 1924 Provisional Order for altering the Coventry Corporation Act 1920. (Note: Coventry Corporation Act 1920 (10 & 11 Geo. 5. c. lxxxviii))	
	Isle of Thanet Joint Hospital Order 1924 Provisional Order for altering certain Provisional Orders.	
	Stafford Order 1924 Provisional Order for altering the Stafford Corporation Act 1876 (Note: Stafford Corporation Act 1876 (39 & 40 Vict. c. cxcvi)) the Stafford Corporation Act 1880 (Note: Stafford Corporation Act 1880 (43 & 44 Vict. c. lxxiii)) and a Confirming Act. (Note: Local Government Board's Provisional Orders Confirmation (No. 13) Act 1914 (4 & 5 Geo. 5. c. cxxxiii))	
	Swansea Order 1924 Provisional Order for altering the Swansea Corporation Act 1920 (Note: Swansea Corporation Act 1920 (10 & 11 Geo. 5. c. xlvii)) and the Swansea Corporation Act 1922. (Note: Swansea Corporation Act 1922 (12 & 13 Geo. 5. c. lxiv))	
	Whitstable Order 1924 Provisional Order for altering the Whitstable Water and Improvement Act 1902 (Note: Whitstable Water and Improvement Act 1902 (2 Edw. 7. c. ccxxxix)) and a Confirming Act. (Note: Ministry of Health Provisional Orders Confirmation (No. 9) Act 1922 (12 & 13 Geo. 5. c. xcvii))	
Ministry of Health Provisional Orders Confirmation (No. 2) Act 1924	14 & 15 Geo. 5. c. xiv	14 July 1924
An Act to confirm certain Provisional Orders of the Minister of Health relating to Leyton Plymouth Reading Rugby Joint Hospital District Scarborough and Worsley.
	Leyton Order 1924 Provisional Order to enable the Urban District Council of Leyton to put in force the Compulsory Clauses of the Lands Clauses Acts.	
	Plymouth (Poor Law) Order 1924 Provisional Order for partially repealing and altering the Local Act 53 George III. Chapter 73. (Note: Plymouth Workhouse Act 1813 (53 Geo. 3. c. lxxiii))	
	Rugby Joint Hospital Order 1924 Provisional Order for altering the Local Government Board's Provisional Orders Confirmation (No. 9) Act 1905. (Note: Local Government Board's Provisional Orders Confirmation (No. 9) Act 1905 (5 Edw. 7. c. lxxv))	
	Scarborough Order 1924 Provisional Order for altering the Scarborough Improvement Act 1889. (Note: Scarborough Improvement Act 1889 (52 & 53 Vict. c. clxiv))	
	Reading Order 1924 Provisional Order for altering the Reading Corporation Act 1913. (Note: Reading Corporation Act 1913 (3 & 4 Geo. 5. c. cvii))	
	Worsley Order 1924 Provisional Order to enable the Urban District Council of Worsley to put in force the Compulsory Clauses of the Lands Clauses Acts.	
Ministry of Health Provisional Orders Confirmation (No. 3) Act 1924	14 & 15 Geo. 5. c. xv	14 July 1924
An Act to confirm certain Provisional Orders of the Minister of Health relating to Cambridge Darwen Hyde Middlesex Districts Joint Small-pox Hospital District Portsmouth and Stoke-on-Trent.
	Cambridge Order 1924 Provisional Order to enable the Cambridge Corporation to put in force the Compulsory Clauses of the Lands Clauses Acts.	
	Darwen Order 1924 Provisional Order to enable the Darwen Corporation to put in force the Compulsory Clauses of the Lands Clauses Acts.	
	Hyde (Rates) Order 1924 Provisional Order for partially repealing altering and amending certain Local Acts.	
	Middlesex Districts Joint Small-pox Hospital Order 1924 Provisional Order for altering certain Confirming Acts.	
	Portsmouth Order 1924 Provisional Order to enable the Portsmouth Corporation to put in force the Compulsory Clauses of the Lands Clauses Acts.	
	Stoke-on-Trent Order 1924 Provisional Order to enable the Stoke-on-Trent Corporation to put in force the Compulsory Clauses of the Lands Clauses Acts.	
Ministry of Health Provisional Orders Confirmation (No. 4) Act 1924	14 & 15 Geo. 5. c. xvi	14 July 1924
An Act to confirm certain Provisional Orders of the Minister of Health relating to Felixstowe Folkestone Sheffield Stourbridge Widnes and Wolverhampton.
	Felixstowe Order 1924 Provisional Order for amending the Felixstowe and Walton Improvement Act 1902. (Note: Felixstowe and Walton Improvement Act 1902 (2 Edw. 7. c. clxiii))	
	Folkestone Order 1924 Provisional Order for partially repealing and altering the Folkestone Corporation Act 1901 (Note: Folkestone Corporation Act 1901 (1 Edw. 7. c. vi)) and the Folkestone Corporation Act 1920. (Note: Folkestone Corporation Act 1920 (10 & 11 Geo. 5. c. lix))	
	Sheffield Order 1924 Provisional Order for altering or amending the Sheffield Corporation (Consolidation) Act 1918. (Note: Sheffield Corporation (Consolidation) Act 1918 (8 & 9 Geo. 5. c. lxi))	
	Stourbridge Order 1924 Provisional Order for partially repealing the Stourbridge Improvement Act 1866. (Note: Stourbridge Improvement Act 1866 (29 & 30 Vict. c. clxix))	
	Widnes Order 1924 Provisional Order to enable the Widnes Corporation to put in force the Compulsory Clauses of the Lands Clauses Acts.	
	Wolverhampton Order 1924 Provisional Order for amending the Local Government Board's Provisional Orders Confirmation (No. 19) Act 1896. (Note: Local Government Board's Provisional Orders Confirmation (No. 19) Act 1896 (59 & 60 Vict. c. cxi))	
Ministry of Health Provisional Orders Confirmation (No. 5) Act 1924	14 & 15 Geo. 5. c. xvii	14 July 1924
An Act to confirm certain Provisional Orders of the Minister of Health relating to Bridlington Brighton and Hove Halifax Oldham and Pembroke.
	Bridlington Order 1924 Provisional Order for partially repealing altering and amending certain local Acts.	
	Brighton and Hove (Outfall Sewers) Order 1924 Provisional Order for altering certain Local Acts and Provisional Orders.	
	Halifax Order 1924 Provisional Order for partially repealing and amending certain Local Acts.	
	Oldham (Water) Order 1924 Provisional Order for altering the Oldham Corporation Act 1909. (Note: Oldham Corporation Act 1909 (9 Edw. 7. c. lxxxix))	
	County of Pembroke Order 1924 Provisional Order made in pursuance of subsection (2) of Section 69 of the Local Government Act 1888. (Note: Local Government Act 1888 (51 & 52 Vict. c. 41))	
Ministry of Health Provisional Orders Confirmation (Water) Act 1924	14 & 15 Geo. 5. c. xviii	14 July 1924
An Act to confirm certain Provisional Orders of the Minister of Health relating to Bradfield Water Burnham and District Water and Portishead District Water.
	Bradfield Water Order 1924 Provisional Order under the Gas and Water Works Facilities Act 1870 (Note: Gas and Water Works Facilities Act 1870 (33 & 34 Vict. c. 70)) and the Gas and Water Works Facilities Act 1870 Amendment Act 1873 (Note: Gas and Water Works Facilities Act 1870 Amendment Act 1873 (36 & 37 Vict. c. 89)) for increasing the rates leviable under the Bradfield Water Order 1904 and for other purposes.	
	Burnham and District Water Order 1924 Provisional Order under the Gas and Water Works Facilities Act 1870 and the Gas and Water Works Facilities Act 1870 Amendment Act 1873 for empowering the Burnham Dorney and Hitcham Waterworks Company Limited to increase their capital and for other purposes.	
	Portishead District Water Order 1924 Provisional Order under the Gas and Water Works Facilities Act 1870 and the Gas and Water Works Facilities Act 1870 Amendment Act 1873 for increasing the rates leviable by the Portishead District Water Company and for other purposes.	
Ministry of Health Provisional Order Confirmation (Watford Extension) Act 1924	14 & 15 Geo. 5. c. xix	14 July 1924
An Act to confirm a Provisional Order of the Minister of Health relating to Watford.
	Watford (Extension) Order 1924 Provisional Order made in pursuance of the Local Government Act 1888 for the extension of a Borough.	
Ministry of Health Provisional Order Confirmation (Stratford-upon-Avon Extension) Act 1924 (repealed)	14 & 15 Geo. 5. c. xx	14 July 1924
An Act to confirm a Provisional Order of the Minister of Health relating to Stratford-upon-Avon. (Repealed by Statute Law (Repeals) Act 1995 (c. 44))
	Stratford-upon-Avon (Extension) Order 1924 Provisional Order made in pursuance of the Local Government Act 1888 for the extension of a Borough.	
Board of Education Scheme (Female Orphan Asylum, &c.) Confirmation Act 1924 (repealed)	14 & 15 Geo. 5. c. xxi	14 July 1924
An Act to confirm a Scheme approved and certified by the Board of Education under the Charitable Trusts Act 1853 (Note: Charitable Trusts Act 1853 (16 & 17 Vict. c. 137)) relating to the Female Orphan Asylum the National Orphan Home and the Hans Town School of Industry. (Repealed by Statute Law (Repeals) Act 2013 (c. 2))
	Scheme approved and certified by the Board of Education under the Charitable Trusts Acts 1853 to 1894 in the matter of the Female Orphan Asylum the National Orphan Home and the Hans Town School of Industry.	
Greenock Improvement (Extension of Time) Order Confirmation Act 1924	14 & 15 Geo. 5. c. xxii	14 July 1924
An Act to confirm a Provisional Order under the Private Legislation Procedure (Scotland) Act 1899 relating to Greenock Improvement.
	Greenock Improvement (Extension of Time) Order 1924 Provisional Order to extend the period for the completion of certain works authorised by the Greenock Improvement Order 1919.	
Coatbridge Burgh Extension Order Confirmation Act 1924	14 & 15 Geo. 5. c. xxiii	14 July 1924
An Act to confirm a Provisional Order under the Private Legislation Procedure (Scotland) Act 1899 relating to Coatbridge Burgh Extension.
	Coatbridge Burgh Extension Order 1924 Provisional Order to extend the boundaries of the Burgh of Coatbridge and for other purposes.	
Kilmarnock Corporation Order Confirmation Act 1924	14 & 15 Geo. 5. c. xxiv	14 July 1924
An Act to confirm a Provisional Order under the Private Legislation Procedure (Scotland) Act 1899 relating to Kilmarnock Corporation.
	Kilmarnock Corporation Order 1924 Provisional Order to authorise the Provost Magistrates and Councillors of the Burgh of Kilmarnock to provide and run Omnibuses within and beyond that burgh and for other purposes.	
London and North Eastern Railway (Dock Charges Scotland) Order Confirmation Act 1924	14 & 15 Geo. 5. c. xxv	14 July 1924
An Act to confirm a Provisional Order under the Private Legislation Procedure (Scotland) Act 1899 relating to the London and North Eastern Railway (Dock Charges Scotland).
	London and North Eastern Railway (Dock Charges Scotland) Order 1924 Provisional Order to make provision as to the rates dues tolls and charges leviable at certain of the harbours docks and piers of the London and North Eastern Railway Company in Scotland.	
Glasgow University (Barbour Scholarship) Order Confirmation Act 1924	14 & 15 Geo. 5. c. xxvi	14 July 1924
An Act to confirm a Provisional Order under the Private Legislation Procedure (Scotland) Act 1899 relating to the Glasgow University (Barbour Scholarship).
	Glasgow University (Barbour Scholarship) Order 1924 Provisional Order to confer further powers upon the University Court of the University of Glasgow in reference to the Barbour Scholarship for the promotion of research in anatomy or physiology to vary the testamentary writings of the late John Borthwick Barbour and for other purposes.	
Burntisland Water Order Confirmation Act 1924	14 & 15 Geo. 5. c. xxvii	14 July 1924
An Act to confirm a Provisional Order under the Private Legislation Procedure (Scotland) Act 1899 relating to Burntisland Water.
	Burntisland Water Order 1924 Provisional Order io authorise the provost magistrates and councillors of the Royal Burgh of Burntisland to construct additional waterworks to borrow money and for other purposes.	
St. Enoch's Church and Parish Quoad Sacra Order Confirmation Act 1924	14 & 15 Geo. 5. c. xxviii	14 July 1924
An Act to confirm a Provisional Order under the Private Legislation Procedure (Scotland) Act 1899 relating to St. Enoch's Church and Parish Quoad Sacra.
	St. Enoch's Church and Parish Quoad Sacra Order 1924 Provisional Order to authorise the suppression of St. Enoch's Church Glasgow and the discharge of all the Corporation of Glasgow's liabilities therefor the annexation of St. Enoch's quoad sacra parish Glasgow to another parish or parishes the suppression of Hogganfield Church and Parish quoad sacra and the disjunction and erection of a new church and parish quoad sacra the transfer of the endowments of Hogganfield Church to such new church and parish and the further endowment thereof and the application of the prices of Hogganfield Church and manse the transfer to the Presbytery of Glasgow of St. Enoch's Sunday school and other property in Ropework Lane and mortifications connected with St. Enoch's Church and parish the transfer of certain other funds of St. Enoch's Church to the new church and other matters relating to these objects.	
Clydebank and District Water Order Confirmation Act 1924	14 & 15 Geo. 5. c. xxix	14 July 1924
An Act to confirm a Provisional Order under the Private Legislation Procedure (Scotland) Act 1899 relating to Clydebank and District Water.
	Clydebank and District Water Order 1924 Provisional Order to extend the time for the completion of certain of the works authorised by the Clydebank and District Water Order 1910 to authorise the Clydebank and District Water Trustees to borrow additional money and for other purposes.	
Stroud Water Act 1924	14 & 15 Geo. 5. c. xxx	14 July 1924
An Act for re-arranging the capital of the Stroud Water Company and empowering them to raise additional capital for increasing the charges of the Company and for other purposes.
Southampton Harbour Act 1924	14 & 15 Geo. 5. c. xxxi	14 July 1924
An Act to confer further powers on the Southampton Harbour Board and for other purposes.
King's Lynn Docks and Railway Act 1924	14 & 15 Geo. 5. c. xxxii	14 July 1924
An Act to confer further powers on the King's Lynn Docks and Railway Company with reference to the leasing of warehouses and other premises and for other purposes.
Harrogate Corporation Act 1924 (repealed)	14 & 15 Geo. 5. c. xxxiii	14 July 1924
An Act to consolidate the rates of the borough of Harrogate and for other purposes. (Repealed by Harrogate Stray Act 1985 (c. xxii))
Sunderland Corporation Act 1924 (repealed)	14 & 15 Geo. 5. c. xxxiv	14 July 1924
An Act to provide for the consolidation of the rates of the borough of Sunderland to extend the time for the exercise by the mayor aldermen and burgesses of the said borough of certain powers under the Sunderland Corporation (Wearmouth Bridge) Act 1915 (Note: Sunderland Corporation (Wearmouth Bridge) Act 1915 (5 & 6 Geo. 5. c. xlvii)) and for other purposes. (Repealed by Tyne and Wear Act 1980 (c. xliii))
Aberdare Canal Act 1924	14 & 15 Geo. 5. c. xxxv	14 July 1924
An Act to confirm the acquisition by the urban district councils of Aberdare and Mountain Ash of the Aberdare Canal and for other purposes.
Malvern Hills Act 1924	14 & 15 Geo. 5. c. xxxvi	14 July 1924
An Act for conferring further powers upon the Malvern Hills Conservators and for other purposes.
City of London (Various Powers) Act 1924	14 & 15 Geo. 5. c. xxxvii	14 July 1924
An Act to confer further powers upon the corporation of London in regard to the city of London police and the rate for the relief of the poor and for other purposes.
Staffordshire and Worcestershire Canal Act 1924	14 & 15 Geo. 5. c. xxxviii	14 July 1924
An Act to confer further powers on the company of proprietors of the Staffordshire and Worcestershire Canal Navigation.
Great Western Railway (Dock Charges) Act 1924	14 & 15 Geo. 5. c. xxxix	14 July 1924
An Act to make provision as to the rates dues tolls and charges leviable at certain of the harbours docks and piers of the Great Western Railway Company and at the Fishguard Harbour of the Fishguard and Rosslare Railways and Harbours Company.
London County Council (Tramways and Improvements) Act 1924	14 & 15 Geo. 5. c. xl	14 July 1924
An Act to empower the London County Council to construct and work a tramway to make a street widening and for other purposes.
London, Midland and Scottish Railway (Dock Charges) Act 1924	14 & 15 Geo. 5. c. xli	14 July 1924
An Act to make provision as to the rates dues tolls and charges leviable at certain of the harbours docks and piers of the London Midland and Scottish Railway Company.
London and North Eastern Railway (Dock Charges) Act 1924	14 & 15 Geo. 5. c. xlii	14 July 1924
An Act to make provision as to the rates dues tolls and charges leviable at certain of the harbours docks and piers of the London and North Eastern Railway Company.
Hackney and New College Act 1924	14 & 15 Geo. 5. c. xliii	14 July 1924
An Act to unite the Hackney College Foundation and the New College London Foundation in one corporation to be called Hackney and New College and for other purposes.
Wandsworth Borough Council (Superannuation) Act 1924 (repealed)	14 & 15 Geo. 5. c. xliv	14 July 1924
An Act to make further provision with respect to the granting of superannuation allowances to the officers and servants of the council of the metropolitan borough of Wandsworth to amend the Wandsworth Borough Council (Superannuation) Act 1909 (Note: Wandsworth Borough Council (Superannuation) Act 1909 (9 Edw. 7. c. ix)) and for other purposes. (Repealed by Local Law (Greater London Council and Inner London Boroughs) Order 1965 (SI 1965/540))
Aire and Calder Navigation Act 1924	14 & 15 Geo. 5. c. xlv	14 July 1924
An Act to confer further powers on the undertakers of the Aire and Calder Navigation in relation to their undertaking to extend the time for the completion of certain authorised works and for other purposes.
Lancashire Asylums Board Act 1924 (repealed)	14 & 15 Geo. 5. c. xlvi	14 July 1924
An Act to provide for the transfer of the Brockhall Institution at Langho of the Lancashire Inebriates Acts Board to the Lancashire Asylums Board to dissolve the said Inebriates Acts Board and for other purposes. (Repealed by County of Lancashire Act 1984 (c. xxi))
Haslingden Corporation Act 1924	14 & 15 Geo. 5. c. xlvii	14 July 1924
An Act to make better provision for the health local government and finance of the borough of Haslingden to consolidate the local rates leviable in the borough and for other purposes.
Central London and Metropolitan District Railways Act 1924	14 & 15 Geo. 5. c. xlviii	14 July 1924
An Act for empowering the Central London Railway Company to construct subways and works to confer further powers on that Company and on the Metropolitan District Railway Company the London Electric Railway Company and the Southern Railway Company and for other purposes.
Southern Railway (Dock Charges) Act 1924	14 & 15 Geo. 5. c. xlix	14 July 1924
An Act to make provision as to the rates dues tolls and charges leviable at the harbours docks and piers at Folkestone Whitstable and Newhaven.
Great Western Railway (Additional Powers) Act 1924	14 & 15 Geo. 5. c. l	1 August 1924
An Act for conferring further powers upon the Great Western Railway Company and for other purposes.
London, Midland and Scottish Railway (Superannuation Fund) Act 1924	14 & 15 Geo. 5. c. li	1 August 1924
An Act to establish a superannuation fund for the salaried officers and servants of the London Midland and Scottish Railway Company and for other purposes.
Grampian Electricity Supply Act 1924 (repealed)	14 & 15 Geo. 5. c. lii	1 August 1924
An Act to confer further powers upon the Grampian Electricity Supply Company and for other purposes. (Repealed by North of Scotland Electricity Order Confirmation Act 1958 (7 & 8 Eliz. 2. c. ii))
London and North Eastern Railway Act 1924	14 & 15 Geo. 5. c. liii	1 August 1924
An Act to empower the London and North Eastern Railway Company to construct new railways widenings and other works and to acquire lands to authorise the South Yorkshire Joint Line Committee to construct a new railway to extend the time for the completion of certain works and for the compulsory purchase of certain lands and for other purposes.
London, Midland and Scottish Railway Act 1924	14 & 15 Geo. 5. c. liv	1 August 1924
An Act to empower the London Midland and Scottish Railway Company and the Midland and Great Northern Railways Joint Committee to construct works and acquire lands to extend the time for the completion of certain works and to revive the powers for the compulsory purchase of certain lands to authorise the abandonment of certain railways and for other purposes.
Morecambe Corporation Act 1924	14 & 15 Geo. 5. c. lv	1 August 1924
An Act to empower the mayor aldermen and burgesses of the borough of Morecambe to construct promenades street improvements and works to make further and better provision for the health local government and improvement of the borough to commute the annual corn rent payable to the vicar of Lancaster by the inhabitants of the borough to consolidate the rates of the borough and for other purposes.
Kingston-upon-Hull Corporation Act 1924	14 & 15 Geo. 5. c. lvi	1 August 1924
An Act to confer further powers upon the lord mayor aldermen and citizens of the city and county of Kingston upon Hull for the construction of street works and tramways to extend their limits for the supply of water and to make further provision for the health and improvement of the city and for other purposes.
London County Council (General Powers) Act 1924	14 & 15 Geo. 5. c. lvii	1 August 1924
An Act to confer further powers upon the London County Council and the Metropolitan Borough Councils to confer certain powers upon the Barnes Urban District Council and for other purposes.
Manchester Ship Canal Act 1924	14 & 15 Geo. 5. c. lviii	1 August 1924
An Act to provide for the buoying and lighting of the access between the Weston Mersey Lock and the navigable channel of the Mersey to confer further powers upon the Manchester Ship Canal Company with respect to the dredging of the River Mersey and the lowering of the level of the bottom of part of the Manchester Ship Canal and for other purposes.
Sutton Harbour Act 1924	14 & 15 Geo. 5. c. lix	1 August 1924
An Act to increase the rates dues and charges leviable by. the Sutton Harbour Improvement Company and for other purposes.
London County Council (Money) Act 1924 (repealed)	14 & 15 Geo. 5. c. lx	1 August 1924
An Act to regulate the expenditure on capital account and lending of money by the London County Council during the financial period from the first day of April one thousand nine hundred and twenty-four to the thirtieth day of September one thousand nine hundred and twenty-five and for other purposes. (Repealed by London County Council (Loans) Act 1955 (4 & 5 Eliz. 2. c. xxvi))
Neath Harbour Act 1924	14 & 15 Geo. 5. c. lxi	1 August 1924
An Act to alter and increase the rates tolls and dues leviable by the Neath Harbour Commissioners and for other purposes.
Southend Waterworks Act 1924	14 & 15 Geo. 5. c. lxii	1 August 1924
An Act to authorise the Southend Waterworks Company to construct new works and to raise additional capital and for other purposes.
Brighton Corporation Water Act 1924 (repealed)	14 & 15 Geo. 5. c. lxiii	1 August 1924
An Act to enable the mayor aldermen and burgesses of the county borough of Brighton to purchase lands and exercise further powers for the prevention of contamination of their water supply and for other purposes of their water undertaking. (Repealed by Brighton Corporation Act 1931 (21 & 22 Geo. 5. c. cix))
Thames Conservancy Act 1924 (repealed)	14 & 15 Geo. 5. c. lxiv	1 August 1924
An Act to amend and extend the enactments relating to the powers and duties of the Conservators of the River Thames to make further provision for the revenue of the Conservators and for other purposes. (Repealed by Thames Conservancy Act 1932 (22 & 23 Geo. 5. c. xxxvii))
Birmingham Corporation Act 1924	14 & 15 Geo. 5. c. lxv	1 August 1924
An Act to confer further powers upon the lord mayor aldermen and citizens of the city of Birmingham in regard to the construction of tramways a new street and street improvements and other matters and for other purposes.
Southern Railway Act 1924	14 & 15 Geo. 5. c. lxvi	1 August 1924
An Act to empower the Southern Railway Company to extend their dock undertaking at Southampton and to construct works and acquire lands to abandon certain existing and authorised railways and works to transfer to the said Company the undertaking of the Wimbledon and Sutton Railway Company and the undertaking of the Ryde Pier Company and for other purposes.
London County Council (Lambeth Bridge) Act 1924	14 & 15 Geo. 5. c. lxvii	1 August 1924
An Act to empower the London County Council to rebuild Lambeth Bridge and to make street improvements and other works in connection therewith.
Staffordshire Potteries Water Board Act 1924	14 & 15 Geo. 5. c. lxviii	1 August 1924
An Act to constitute a Water Board to acquire the undertaking of the Staffordshire Potteries Waterworks Company and to supply water within the limits of supply of that company and for other purposes.
Rotherham Corporation Act 1924	14 & 15 Geo. 5. c. lxix	1 August 1924
An Act to confer further powers upon the mayor aldermen and burgesses of the county borough of Rotherham for the construction of street improvements and for the running of trolley vehicles and omnibuses to enlarge their powers in regard to their tramway gas electricity water and markets undertakings and to make further provision with respect to the health local government and improvement of the borough and for other purposes.
Halifax Corporation Act 1924	14 & 15 Geo. 5. c. lxx	1 August 1924
An Act to confer further powers on the corporation of Halifax with respect to their water and electricity undertakings to increase water charges to authorise the acquisition of the Shibden Hall Estate as a public park and for other purposes.
Wakefield Corporation Act 1924	14 & 15 Geo. 5. c. lxxi	1 August 1924
An Act to confer further powers. upon the mayor aldermen and citizens of the city of Wakefield with regard to the construction of waterworks and the consolidation of parishes and to make further provision with regard to their electricity undertaking and the health improvement and good government of the city and for other purposes.
Ministry of Health Provisional Orders Confirmation (No. 6) Act 1924	14 & 15 Geo. 5. c. lxxii	1 August 1924
An Act to confirm certain Provisional Orders of the Minister of Health relating to Kingston-upon-Hull Kingston-upon-Thames Liverpool Loughborough Rochdale and Uxbridge.
	Kingston-upon-Hull (Poor Law) Order 1924 Provisional Order for partially repealing and altering the Local Act 5 George IV. Chapter xіii. (Note: Hull Poor Relief Act 1824 (5 Geo. 4. c. xiii))	
	Kingston-upon-Thames Order 1924 Provisional Order for altering the Kingston-upon-Thames Improvement Act 1888. (Note: Kingston-upon-Thames Improvement Act 1888 (51 & 52 Vict. c. clxxxiii))	
	Liverpool Order 1924 Provisional Order for amending a Local Act. (Note: Liverpool Corporation Act 1921 (11 & 12 Geo. 5. c. lxxiv))	
	Loughborough Order 1924 Provisional Order to enable the Loughborough Corporation to put in force the Compulsory Clauses of the Lands Clauses Acts.	
	Rochdale Order 1924 Provisional Order for partially repealing and altering certain Local Acts and a Provisional Order confirmed by Parliament.	
	Uxbridge Order 1924 Provisional Order to enable the Urban District Council of Uxbridge to put in force the Compulsory Clauses of the Lands Clauses Acts.	
Ministry of Health Provisional Orders Confirmation (No. 7) Act 1924	14 & 15 Geo. 5. c. lxxiii	1 August 1924
An Act to confirm certain Provisional Orders of the Minister of Health relating to Blackpool Denton Derwent Valley Water Board North Cornwall Joint Water District Poole and Wimbledon.
	Blackpool Order 1924 Provisional Order for amending certain Local Acts.	
	Denton Order 1924 Provisional Order to enable the Urban District Council of Denton to put in force the Compulsory Clauses of the Lands Clauses Acts.	
	Derwent Valley Water Order 1924 Provisional Order for altering the Derwent Valley Water Act 1920. (Note: Derwent Valley Water Act 1920 (10 & 11 Geo. 5. c. clxv))	
	North Cornwall Joint Water Order 1924 Provisional Order for forming a United District under Section 279 of the Public Health Act 1875. (Note: Public Health Act 1875 (38 & 39 Vict. c. 55))	
	Poole Order 1924 Provisional Order to amend the Poole (Extension) Order 1905 and for partially repealing the Poole Corporation Water Act 1906. (Note: Poole Corporation Water Act 1906 (6 Edw. 7. c. clxxix))	
	Wimbledon Order 1924 Provisional Order for altering the Wimbledon Corporation Act 1914. (Note: Wimbledon Corporation Act 1914 (4 & 5 Geo. 5. c. clxiv))	
Ministry of Health Provisional Orders Confirmation (No. 8) Act 1924	14 & 15 Geo. 5. c. lxxiv	1 August 1924
An Act to confirm certain Provisional Orders of the Minister of Health relating to Bognor Brighouse Durham Newport (Monmouth) North-West Gloucestershire Joint Smallpox Hospital District and South Staffordshire Joint Smallpox Hospital District.
	Bognor Order 1924 Provisional Order for partially repealing and altering certain Local Acts and Confirming Acts.	
	Brighouse Order 1924 Provisional Order to enable the Brighouse Corporation to put in force the Compulsory Clauses of the Lands Clauses Acts.	
	Durham Order 1924 Provisional Order to enable the Rural District Council of Durham to put in force the Compulsory Clauses of the Lands Clauses Acts.	
	Newport (Mon.) Order 1924 Provisional Order for amending the Newport Corporation Act 1914. (Note: Newport Corporation Act 1914 (4 & 5 Geo. 5. c. lxxxviii))	
	North-West Gloucestershire Joint Smallpox Hospital Order 1924 Provisional Order for forming a United District under Section 279 of the Public Health Act 1875 and altering a Confirming Act. (Note: Local Government Board's Provisional Orders Confirmation (No. 2) Act 1911 (1 & 2 Geo. 5. c. cxli))	
	South Staffordshire Joint Smallpox Hospital Order 1924 Provisional Order for altering certain Orders confirmed by Parliament.	
Pier and Harbour Orders Confirmation (No. 1) Act 1924	14 & 15 Geo. 5. c. lxxv	1 August 1924
An Act to confirm certain Provisional Orders made by the Minister of Transport under the General Pier and Harbour Act 1861 (Note: General Pier and Harbour Act 1861 (24 & 25 Vict. c. 45)) relating to Blackpool (South Shore) Helensburgh Montrose Penarth and Whitehaven.
	Blackpool (South Shore) Pier Order 1924 Provisional Order for varying certain rates chargeable in respect of the use of Blackpool (South Shore) Pier.	
	Helensburgh Harbour Order 1924 Provisional Order to alter and amend the rates and charges leviable at Helensburgh Harbour and for other purposes.	
	Montrose Harbour Order 1924 Provisional Order for increasing certain dues and rates Montrose leviable by and for extending the borrowing powers of the Trustees of the Harbour of Montrose and for other purposes.	
	Penarth Pier Order 1924 Provisional Order for the transfer of the undertaking of the Penarth Promenade and Landing Pier Company Limited to the Urban District Council of Penarth and for other purposes in connection therewith.	
	Whitehaven Harbour Order 1924 Provisional Order to increase certain of the maximum Whitehaven rates leviable by the Whitehaven Harbour Commissioners.	
Royal Samaritan Hospital for Women Glasgow Order Confirmation Act 1924	14 & 15 Geo. 5. c. lxxvi	1 August 1924
An Act to confirm a Provisional Order under the Private Legislation Procedure (Scotland) Act 1899 relating to the Royal Samaritan Hospital for Women Glasgow.
	Royal Samaritan Hospital for Women Glasgow Order 1924 Provisional Order to incorporate the Royal Samaritan Hospital for Women Glasgow to amend its objects and constitution to make provision with respect to its property funds and finances to provide for the constitution of the Board of Management and for the representation thereon of the Ladies Auxiliary Association of the Hospital and of Employee Subscribers in public works and other industrial organisations and for other purposes.	
Edinburgh Corporation (Tramways, &c.) Order Confirmation Act 1924	14 & 15 Geo. 5. c. lxxvii	1 August 1924
An Act to confirm a Provisional Order under the Private Legislation Procedure (Scotland) Act 1899 relating to Edinburgh Corporation (Tramways &c.).
	Edinburgh Corporation (Tramways, &c.) Order 1924 Provisional Order to authorise the Corporation of the City and Royal Burgh of Edinburgh to make and maintain tramways to construct works to acquire lands to borrow money to amend the Edinburgh Municipal and Police Acts and for other purposes.	
Rothesay Tramways (Amendment) Order Confirmation Act 1924	14 & 15 Geo. 5. c. lxxviii	1 August 1924
An Act to confirm a Provisional Order under the Private Legislation Procedure (Scotland) Act 1899 relating to Rothesay Tramways.
	Rothesay Tramways (Amendment) Order 1924 Provisional Order to amend the Rothesay Tramways Orders 1880 to 1918.	
London, Midland and Scottish Railway (Dock Charges Scotland) Order Confirmation Act 1924	14 & 15 Geo. 5. c. lxxix	1 August 1924
An Act to confirm a Provisional Order under the Private Legislation Procedure (Scotland) Act 1899 relating to the. London Midland and Scottish Railway (Dock Charges Scotland).
	London, Midland and Scottish Railway (Dock Charges Scotland) Order 1924 Provisional Order to make provision as to the rates dues tolls and charges leviable at certain of the Harbours Docks and Piers of the London Midland and Scottish Railway Company in Scotland.	
Post Office (London) Railway Act 1924	14 & 15 Geo. 5. c. lxxx	7 August 1924
An Act to extend the time for the completion of works under the Post Office (London) Railway Act 1913. (Note: Post Office (London) Railway Act 1913 (3 & 4 Geo. 5. c. cxvi))
Ministry of Health Provisional Orders Confirmation (No. 9) Act 1924	14 & 15 Geo. 5. c. lxxxi	7 August 1924
An Act to confirm certain Provisional Orders of the Minister of Health relating to Brighton Doncaster Doncaster and Tickhill Joint Water District Northumberland and Sheffield.
	Brighton Order 1924 Provisional Order to enable the Brighton Corporation to put in force the Compulsory Clauses of the Lands Clauses Acts.	
	Doncaster Order 1924 Provisional Order to enable the Doncaster Corporation to put in force the Compulsory Clauses of the Lands Clauses Acts.	
	Doncaster and Tickhill Joint Water Order 1924 Provisional Order for forming a United District under Section 279 of the Public Health Act 1875.	
	County of Northumberland Order 1924 Provisional Order made in pursuance of subsection (2) of Section 69 of the Local Government Act 1888.	
	Sheffield Order (No. 2) 1924 Provisional Order to enable the Sheffield Corporation to put in force the Compulsory Clauses of the Lands Clauses Acts.	
Pier and Harbour Orders Confirmation (No. 2) Act 1924	14 & 15 Geo. 5. c. lxxxii	7 August 1924
An Act to confirm certain Provisional Orders made by the Minister of Transport under the General Pier and Harbour Act 1861 relating to Girvan Great Yarmouth and Teignmouth.
	Girvan Harbour Order 1924 Provisional Order for the transfer to the provost magistrates and councillors of the burgh of Girvan of the undertaking known as the harbour of Girvan to confer powers on the Town Council with reference thereto and the maintenance management and improvement thereof and for other purposes.	
	Great Yarmouth Port and Haven Order 1924 Provisional Order for varying certain tolls leviable by the Great Yarmouth Port and Haven Commissioners and for other purposes.	
	Teignmouth Harbour Order 1924 Provisional Order for the management and improvement of the Harbour of Teignmouth in the County of Devon.	
Keighley Corporation (Trolley Vehicles) Order Confirmation Act 1924 (repealed)	14 & 15 Geo. 5. c. lxxxiii	7 August 1924
An Act to confirm a Provisional Order made by the Minister of Transport under the Keighley Corporation Act 1912 (Note: Keighley Corporation Act 1912 (2 & 3 Geo. 5. c. cvii)) relating to Keighley Corporation trolley vehicles. (Repealed by West Yorkshire Act 1980 (c. xiv))
	Keighley Corporation (Trolley Vehicles) Order 1924 Order authorising the Mayor Aldermen and Burgesses of the borough of Keighley to provide maintain and use trolley vehicles upon routes in their borough.	
St. Helens Corporation (Trolley Vehicles) Order Confirmation Act 1924 (repealed)	14 & 15 Geo. 5. c. lxxxiv	7 August 1924
An Act to confirm a Provisional Order made by the Minister of Transport under the St. Helens Corporation Act 1921 (Note: St. Helens Corporation Act 1921 (11 & 12 Geo. 5. c. lxxiii)) relating to St. Helens Corporation trolley vehicles. (Repealed by County of Merseyside Act 1980 (c. x))
	St. Helens Corporation (Trolley Vehicles) Order 1924 Order authorising the mayor aldermen and burgesses of the borough of St. Helens to provide maintain and use trolley vehicles upon routes in the borough of St. Helens the urban district of Prescot and the townships of Eccleston Rainhill and Whiston in the rural district of Whiston.	
Midlothian (Calder District) Water Order Confirmation Act 1924	14 & 15 Geo. 5. c. lxxxv	7 August 1924
An Act to confirm a Provisional Order under the Private Legislation Procedure (Scotland) Act 1899 relating to Midlothian (Calder District) Water.
	Midlothian (Calder District) Water Order 1924 Provisional Order to authorise the District Committee of the Calder District of the county of Midlothian to construct and maintain waterworks and to supply water within their district to authorise and require the County Council of the county of Midlothian to levy assessments and to borrow money for the purposes of such water supply and for other purposes.	
Edinburgh Corporation Water Order Confirmation Act 1924 (repealed)	14 & 15 Geo. 5. c. lxxxvi	7 August 1924
An Act to confirm a Provisional Order under the Private Legislation Procedure (Scotland) Act 1899 relating to Edinburgh Corporation Water. (Repealed by Edinburgh Corporation Order Confirmation Act 1958 (7 & 8 Eliz. 2. c. v))
	Edinburgh Corporation Water Order 1924 Provisional Order to consolidate with amendments the Acts and Orders relating to the water undertaking of the Corporation of the City and Royal Burgh of Edinburgh to confer further powers upon the Corporation in respect of the said undertaking and for other purposes.	
Ashton-under-Lyne Corporation Act 1924	14 & 15 Geo. 5. c. lxxxvii	7 August 1924
An Act to empower the mayor aldermen and burgesses of the borough of Ashton-under-Lyne to provide and work trolley vehicles and motor omnibuses to provide for the running of trolley vehicles between the boroughs of Ashton-under-Lyne and Oldham to extend the area of supply of the Ashton-under-Lyne Corporation for electricity purposes to confer further powers with regard to the market streets and buildings the health and good government of the borough and the consolidation of rates and for other purposes.
Hastings Corporation Act 1924	14 & 15 Geo. 5. c. lxxxviii	7 August 1924
An Act to empower the mayor aldermen and burgesses of the county borough of Hastings to construct additional waterworks and to execute street improvements to make further provision in regard to the water and electricity undertakings of the Corporation to make further provision for the improvement health and good government of the borough to consolidate the parishes and rates of the borough and for other purposes.
Leeds Corporation Act 1924 (repealed)	14 & 15 Geo. 5. c. lxxxix	7 August 1924
An Act to provide for the alteration of the unions wholly or partly in the city of Leeds and to amalgamate the parishes in that city to confer further powers upon the lord mayor aldermen and citizens of the city in relation to their water and tramways undertakings and the construction of street improvements and to make further provision for the health local government and improvement of the city and for other purposes. (Repealed by West Yorkshire Act 1980 (c. xiv))
Londonderry and Lough Swilly Railway Act 1924	14 & 15 Geo. 5. c. xc	7 August 1924
An Act to increase the borrowing powers of the Londonderry and Lough Swilly Railway Company and for other purposes.
Taf Fechan Water Supply Act 1924	14 & 15 Geo. 5. c. xci	7 August 1924
An Act to empower the Taf Fechan Water Supply Board to construct additional waterworks and for other purposes.
Clyde Valley Electrical Power Act 1924 (repealed)	14 & 15 Geo. 5. c. xcii	7 August 1924
An Act to authorise the Clyde Valley Electrical Power Company to raise additional capital to extend the area of supply of the Company and for other purposes. (Repealed by South of Scotland Electricity Order Confirmation Act 1956 (4 & 5 Eliz. 2. c. xciv))
Lanarkshire Hydro-Electric Power Act 1924 (repealed)	14 & 15 Geo. 5. c. xciii	7 August 1924
An Act for incorporating and conferring powers upon the Lanarkshire Hydro-Electric Power Company and for other purposes. (Repealed by South of Scotland Electricity Order Confirmation Act 1956 (4 & 5 Eliz. 2. c. xciv))
Rhymney and Aber Gas Act 1924	14 & 15 Geo. 5. c. xciv	7 August 1924
An Act to enable the Rhymney and Aber Gas Company to sell gas on a heat unit basis to make new provision as to charges for the gas and application of the profits of the Company to consolidate the ordinary capital of the Company to confirm an agreement made between the Company and the Powell Duffryn Steam Coal Company Limited and for other purposes.
Manchester Corporation Act 1924	14 & 15 Geo. 5. c. xcv	7 August 1924
An Act to confer further powers upon the lord mayor aldermen and citizens of the city of Manchester for the construction of street improvements main drainage works and tramways and for the running of trolley vehicles to enlarge their powers in regard to their water gas electricity and tramway undertakings, and to make further provision in regard to the health local government and improvement of the city and for other purposes.
West Cheshire Water Act 1924 (repealed)	14 & 15 Geo. 5. c. xcvi	7 August 1924
An Act to empower the West Cheshire Water Company to acquire additional lands and to raise further capital to increase the charges of the Company and for other purposes. (Repealed by Cheshire County Council Act 1980 (c. xiii))
Newcastle-upon-Tyne and Gateshead Corporations (Bridge) Act 1924 (repealed)	14 & 15 Geo. 5. c. xcvii	7 August 1924
An Act to empower the lord mayor aldermen and citizens of the city and county of Newcastle-upon-Tyne and the mayor aldermen and burgesses of the county borough of Gateshead to construct a bridge over the River Tyne to authorise the construction and working of tramways over the said bridge and the execution of other works and for other purposes. (Repealed by Tyne and Wear Act 1976 (c. xxxvi))
Croydon Corporation Act 1924	14 & 15 Geo. 5. c. xcviii	7 August 1924
An Act to alter the boundary between the county borough of Croydon and the urban district of Mitcham to authorise the mayor aldermen and burgesses of the said borough to execute street works and to provide and work trolley vehicles to make further provision with regard to the tramways undertaking of the Corporation and the health local government and improvement of the borough and for other purposes.
Tynemouth Corporation Act 1924	14 & 15 Geo. 5. c. xcix	7 August 1924
An Act to confer further powers upon the mayor aldermen and burgesses of the borough of Tynemouth with respect to their water fish quay and electricity undertakings to make further provision for the health local government and improvement of the borough and for other purposes.

=== Private and personal acts ===
Short title	Citation	Royal assent
Long title
Spencer Settled Chattels Act 1924	14 & 15 Geo. 5. c. 1 Pr.	14 July 1924
An Act to authorise the sale of certain pictures bequeathed and settled by the first codicil to the will of the Right Honourable John Poyntz Earl Spencer deceased and to provide for the application of the proceeds of such sale and for other purposes.
Scarisbrick Estate Drainage Act 1924	14 & 15 Geo. 5. c. 2 Pr.	7 August 1924
An Act to establish Commissioners to maintain sea embankments and a land drainage system on certain lands in the county borough of Southport and in the parishes of North Meols Scarisbrick Tarleton and Burscough in the county of Lancaster and to transfer certain lands and works to and to confer powers on such Commissioners and for other purposes.

== 15 & 16 Geo. 5 ==
The first session of the 34th Parliament of the United Kingdom, which met from 2 December 1924 until 22 December 1925.

No private acts were passed during this session.

This session was also traditionally cited as 15 & 16 G. 5.

=== Public general acts ===
Short title	Citation	Royal assent
Long title
Expiring Laws Continuance Act 1924 (repealed)	15 & 16 Geo. 5. c. 1	18 December 1924
An Act to continue certain expiring laws. (Repealed by Statute Law Revision Act 1950 (14 Geo. 6. c. 6))
Canals (Continuance of Charging Powers) Act 1924 (repealed)	15 & 16 Geo. 5. c. 2	18 December 1924
An Act to provide for the continuance of charging powers in respect of canal or inland navigation undertakings of which possession was retained or taken by the Minister of Transport under the Ministry of Transport Act, 1919. (Note: Ministry of Transport Act 1919 (9 & 10 Geo. 5. c. 50)) (Repealed by Statute Law (Repeals) Act 1973 (c. 39))
Irish Free State Land Purchase (Loan Guarantee) Act 1924 (repealed)	15 & 16 Geo. 5. c. 3	18 December 1924
An Act to authorise the Treasury to guarantee a loan to be raised by the Government of the Irish Free State for the purposes of Land Purchase in that State. (Repealed by Statute Law (Repeals) Act 1976 (c. 16))
Law of Property Act (Postponement) Act 1924 (repealed)	15 & 16 Geo. 5. c. 4	18 December 1924
An Act to postpone the coming into operation of the Law of Property Act, 1922, (Note: Law of Property Act 1922 (12 & 13 Geo. 5. c. 16)) until the first day of January, nineteen hundred and twenty-six. (Repealed by Statute Law Revision Act 1950 (14 Geo. 6. c. 6))
Law of Property (Amendment) Act 1924	15 & 16 Geo. 5. c. 5	18 December 1924
An Act to amend the Law of Property Act, 1922, and the enactments thereby affected, and to facilitate the consolidation of the law relating to conveyancing and property, settled land, trustees, the registration of pending actions, annuities, writs, orders, deeds of arrangement and land charges, the administration of estates, the registration of title to land and university and college estates.

=== Local acts ===
Short title	Citation	Royal assent
Long title
Aberdeen Harbour (Rates) Order Confirmation Act 1924	15 & 16 Geo. 5. c. i	18 December 1924
An Act to confirm a Provisional Order under the Private Legislation Procedure (Scotland) Act 1899 (Note: Private Legislation Procedure (Scotland) Act 1899 (62 & 63 Vict. c. 47)) relating to Aberdeen Harbour.
	Aberdeen Harbour (Rates) Order 1924 Provisional Order to make provision as to the statutory maximum rates dues tolls and charges leviable at the Harbour of Aberdeen.	
Edinburgh Chartered Accountants Annuity, &c. Fund Order Confirmation Act 1924 (repealed)	15 & 16 Geo. 5. c. ii	18 December 1924
An Act to confirm a Provisional Order under the Private Legislation Procedure (Scotland) Act 1899 relating to the Edinburgh Chartered Accountants Annuity &c. Fund. (Repealed by Statute Law (Repeals) Act 1986 (c. 12))
	Edinburgh Chartered Accountants Annuity, &c. Fund Order 1924 Provisional Order to amend the provisions of the Edinburgh Chartered Accountants Annuity &c. Fund Act 1887 (Note: Edinburgh Chartered Accountants Annuity, &c. Fund Act 1887 (50 & 51 Vict. c. xi)) to extend the said Act so as to include female as well as male members of the Society of Accountants in Edinburgh to vary the provisions regulating the benefits to be provided out of the Fund to confer further powers of investment and other powers upon the Trustees to repeal the provision of the said Act conferring power to commute annual contributions to repeal existing benefit tables to substitute new benefit tables to make further provisions regarding the administration of the Fund and the purposes for which it is to be applied and for other purposes.	
Scrabster Harbour Order Confirmation Act 1924	15 & 16 Geo. 5. c. iii	18 December 1924
An Act to confirm a Provisional Order under the Private Legislation Procedure (Scotland) Act 1899 relating to Scrabster Harbour.
	Scrabster Harbour Order 1924 Provisional Order to make provision with regard to the statutory rates leviable at the harbour of Scrabster in the county of Caithness.	
Glasgow Corporation Order Confirmation Act 1924	15 & 16 Geo. 5. c. iv	18 December 1924
An Act to confirm a Provisional Order under the Private Legislation Procedure (Scotland) Act 1899 relating to Glasgow Corporation.
	Glasgow Corporation Order 1924 Provisional Order to authorise the Corporation of the City of Glasgow to construct tramways and street works to consolidate with amendments the provisions of the Glasgow Corporation Acts 1855 to 1923 relating to the valuation of lands and heritages to authorise the Glasgow Court Houses Commissioners to pay superannuation allowances to amend the provisions of the Glasgow Police Acts 1866 to 1923 relating to the construction of footpaths the marking of roads the beating of carpets and the regulation of advertising signs in the City of Glasgow and for other purposes.	
Banff Town Hall Order Confirmation Act 1924	15 & 16 Geo. 5. c. v	18 December 1924
An Act to confirm a Provisional Order under the Private Legislation Procedure (Scotland) Act 1899 relating to Banff Town Hall.
	Banff Town Hall Order 1924 Provisional Order to authorise the transfer to and vesting in the Town Council of the Royal Burgh of Banff of certain property of the benefit or benevolent society of the Saint Andrew's Lodge of Freemasons Number 52 Banff to make provision with reference to the dissolution of the Society and the disposition of its property and for other purposes.	

== See also ==
- List of acts of the Parliament of the United Kingdom
