= List of acts of the Parliament of the United Kingdom from 1911 =

This is a complete list of acts of the Parliament of the United Kingdom for the year 1911.

Note that the first parliament of the United Kingdom was held in 1801; parliaments between 1707 and 1800 were either parliaments of Great Britain or of Ireland). For acts passed up until 1707, see the list of acts of the Parliament of England and the list of acts of the Parliament of Scotland. For acts passed from 1707 to 1800, see the list of acts of the Parliament of Great Britain. See also the list of acts of the Parliament of Ireland.

For acts of the devolved parliaments and assemblies in the United Kingdom, see the list of acts of the Scottish Parliament, the list of acts of the Northern Ireland Assembly, and the list of acts and measures of Senedd Cymru; see also the list of acts of the Parliament of Northern Ireland.

The number shown after each act's title is its chapter number. Acts passed before 1963 are cited using this number, preceded by the year(s) of the reign during which the relevant parliamentary session was held; thus the Union with Ireland Act 1800 is cited as "39 & 40 Geo. 3 c. 67", meaning the 67th act passed during the session that started in the 39th year of the reign of George III and which finished in the 40th year of that reign. Note that the modern convention is to use Arabic numerals in citations (thus "41 Geo. 3" rather than "41 Geo. III"). Acts of the last session of the Parliament of Great Britain and the first session of the Parliament of the United Kingdom are both cited as "41 Geo. 3". Acts passed from 1963 onwards are simply cited by calendar year and chapter number.

== 1 & 2 Geo. 5 ==
The first session of the 30th Parliament of the United Kingdom, which met from 31 January 1911 until 16 December 1911.

This session was also traditionally cited as 1 & 2 G. 5, 1 Geo. 5 or 1 G. 5.

=== Public general acts ===
Short title	Citation	Royal assent
Long title
Consolidated Fund (No. 1) Act 1911 (repealed)	1 & 2 Geo. 5. c. 1	29 March 1911
An Act to apply certain sums out of the Consolidated Fund to the service of the years ending on the thirty-first day of March one thousand nine hundred and ten, one thousand nine hundred and eleven, and one thousand nine hundred and twelve. (Repealed by Statute Law Revision Act 1927 (17 & 18 Geo. 5. c. 42))
Revenue Act 1911	1 & 2 Geo. 5. c. 2	31 March 1911
An Act to amend the Law relating to Inland Revenue (including Excise) and the National Debt, and for other purposes connected with Finance. (Repealed for England and Wales and Scotland by Statute Law (Repeals) Act 1973 (c. 39))
Army (Annual) Act 1911 (repealed)	1 & 2 Geo. 5. c. 3	28 April 1911
An Act to provide, during Twelve Months, for the Discipline and Regulation of the Army. (Repealed by Statute Law Revision Act 1927 (17 & 18 Geo. 5. c. 42) and Revision of the Army and Air Force Acts (Transitional Provisions) Act 1955 (3 & 4 Eliz. 2. c. 20))
Aerial Navigation Act 1911 (repealed)	1 & 2 Geo. 5. c. 4	2 June 1911
An Act to provide for the protection of the public against dangers arising from the Navigation of Aircraft. (Repealed by Air Navigation Act 1920 (10 & 11 Geo. 5. c. 80))
Consolidated Fund (No. 2) Act 1911 (repealed)	1 & 2 Geo. 5. c. 5	29 June 1911
An Act to apply a sum out of the Consolidated Fund to the service of the year ending on the thirty-first day of March one thousand nine hundred and twelve. (Repealed by Statute Law Revision Act 1927 (17 & 18 Geo. 5. c. 42))
Perjury Act 1911	1 & 2 Geo. 5. c. 6	29 June 1911
An Act to consolidate and simplify the Law relating to Perjury and kindred offences.
Municipal Elections (Corrupt and Illegal Practices) Act 1911 (repealed)	1 & 2 Geo. 5. c. 7	18 August 1911
An Act to amend the Municipal Elections (Corrupt and Illegal Practices) Act, 1884. (Note: Municipal Elections (Corrupt and Illegal Practices) Act 1884 (47 & 48 Vict. c. 70)) (Repealed by Representation of the People Act 1949 (12, 13 & 14 Geo. 6. c. 68))
Merchant Shipping (Seamen's Allotment) Act 1911 (repealed)	1 & 2 Geo. 5. c. 8	18 August 1911
An Act to remove certain doubts as to the true interpretation of the Merchant Shipping Acts, 1894 to 1906, in respect of the Payment of Seamen's Allotment Notes. (Repealed by Merchant Shipping Act 1970 (c. 36))
Public Libraries (Art Galleries in County Boroughs) (Ireland) Act 1911 (repealed)	1 & 2 Geo. 5. c. 9	18 August 1911
An Act to amend the Public Libraries (Ireland) Acts, 1855 to 1902, as respects the provision of Art Galleries in County Boroughs and for other purposes incidental thereto. (Repealed by Public Libraries (Ireland) Act 1920 (10 & 11 Geo. 5. c. 25))
Intestate Husband's Estate (Scotland) Act 1911 (repealed)	1 & 2 Geo. 5. c. 10	18 August 1911
An Act to amend the Law relating to the share of Intestate Husband's Estate falling to the Widow in Scotland. (Repealed by Succession (Scotland) Act 1964 (c. 41))
Poultry Act 1911 (repealed)	1 & 2 Geo. 5. c. 11	18 August 1911
An Act to enable Orders to be made under the Diseases of Animals Acts for protecting Live Poultry from unnecessary suffering, and for other purposes connected therewith. (Repealed for England and Wales and Scotland by Diseases of Animals Act 1935 (25 & 26 Geo. 5. c. 31) and for Northern Ireland by Statute Law Revision Act (Northern Ireland) 1954 (c. 35 (N.I.)))
Public Health (Ireland) Act 1911 (repealed)	1 & 2 Geo. 5. c. 12	18 August 1911
An Act to further amend the Public Health Acts relating to Ireland. (Repealed by Food and Drugs Act (Northern Ireland) 1958 (c. 27 (N.I.)))
Parliament Act 1911	1 & 2 Geo. 5. c. 13	18 August 1911
An Act to make provision with respect to the powers of the House of Lords in relation to those of the House of Commons, and to limit the duration of Parliament.
Isle of Man (Customs) Act 1911 (repealed)	1 & 2 Geo. 5. c. 14	18 August 1911
An Act to amend the Law with respect to Customs in the Isle of Man. (Repealed by Statute Law Revision Act 1927 (17 & 18 Geo. 5. c. 42))
Appropriation Act 1911 (repealed)	1 & 2 Geo. 5. c. 15	18 August 1911
An Act to apply a sum out of the Consolidated Fund to the service of the year ending on the thirty-first day of March nineteen hundred and twelve, and to appropriate the Supplies granted in this Session of Parliament. (Repealed by Statute Law Revision Act 1927 (17 & 18 Geo. 5. c. 42))
Old Age Pensions Act 1911 (repealed)	1 & 2 Geo. 5. c. 16	18 August 1911
An Act to amend the Old Age Pensions Act, 1908. (Note: Old Age Pensions Act 1908 (8 Edw. 7. c. 40)) (Repealed for England and Wales and Scotland by Old Age Pensions Act 1936 (26 Geo. 5 & 1 Edw. 8. c. 31) and for Northern Ireland by Old Age Pensions Act (Northern Ireland) 1936 (26 Geo. 5 & 1 Edw. 8. c. 31 (N.I.)))
Public Works Loans Act 1911	1 & 2 Geo. 5. c. 17	18 August 1911
An Act to grant Money for the purpose of certain Local Loans out of the Local Loans Fund, and for other purposes relating to Local Loans. (Repealed for Northern Ireland by Statute Law Revision Act 1927 (17 & 18 Geo. 5. c. 42) and Public Works &c Loans Act (Northern Ireland) 1953 (c. 13 (N.I.)))
Indian High Courts Act 1911 (repealed)	1 & 2 Geo. 5. c. 18	18 August 1911
An Act to amend the Indian High Courts Act, 1861. (Note: Indian High Courts Act 1861 (24 & 25 Vict. c. 104)) (Repealed by Government of India Act 1915 (5 & 6 Geo. 5. c. 61))
Labourers (Ireland) Act 1911 (repealed)	1 & 2 Geo. 5. c. 19	18 August 1911
An Act to amend the Law relating to Labourers in Ireland. (Repealed by Statute Law Revision Act 1927 (17 & 18 Geo. 5. c. 42), Exchequer and Financial Provisions Act (Northern Ireland) 1949 (c. 12 (N.I.)) and Statute Law Revision Act (Northern Ireland) 1954 (c. 35 (N.I.)))
Geneva Convention Act 1911 (repealed)	1 & 2 Geo. 5. c. 20	18 August 1911
An Act to make such amendments in the Law as are necessary to enable certain reserved provisions of the Second Geneva Convention to be carried into effect. (Repealed by Geneva Conventions Act 1957 (5 & 6 Eliz. 2. c. 52))
Factory and Workshop (Cotton Cloth Factories) Act 1911 (repealed)	1 & 2 Geo. 5. c. 21	18 August 1911
An Act to give power to make Regulations with respect to Cotton Cloth Factories. (Repealed for England and Wales and Scotland by Factory and Workshop (Cotton Cloth Factories) Act 1929 (19 & 20 Geo. 5. c. 15) and for Northern Ireland by Factories Act (Northern Ireland) 1938 (2 Geo. 6. c. 23 (N.I.)))
Expiring Laws Continuance Act 1911 (repealed)	1 & 2 Geo. 5. c. 22	18 August 1911
An Act to continue various Expiring Laws. (Repealed by Statute Law Revision Act 1927 (17 & 18 Geo. 5. c. 42))
National Gallery and St. James's Park Act 1911	1 & 2 Geo. 5. c. 23	18 August 1911
An Act to appropriate certain lands for the purposes of the National Gallery and the National Portrait Gallery and for other purposes connected therewith, and to make provision with respect to certain Crown lands forming part of or adjacent to St. James's Park.
Pensions (Governors of Dominions &c.) Act 1911 (repealed)	1 & 2 Geo. 5. c. 24	18 August 1911
An Act to consolidate and amend the Law relating to the payment of Pensions to Governors of any part of His Majesty's Dominions, or any British Protectorate, or persons holding a similar office. (Repealed by Governors' Pensions Act 1957 (5 & 6 Eliz. 2. c. 62))
Government of India Act Amendment Act 1911 (repealed)	1 & 2 Geo. 5. c. 25	18 August 1911
An Act to amend the Government of India Act, 1858. (Note: Government of India Act 1858 (21 & 22 Vict. c. 106)) (Repealed by Government of India Act 1915 (5 & 6 Geo. 5. c. 61))
Telephone Transfer Act 1911 (repealed)	1 & 2 Geo. 5. c. 26	18 August 1911
An Act to make provision in relation to the transfer to the Postmaster General of the plant, property, and assets, and of the staff of the National Telephone Company, Limited, and for the further improvement of Telephonic Communication. (Repealed by British Telecommunications Act 1981 (c. 38))
Protection of Animals Act 1911	1 & 2 Geo. 5. c. 27	18 August 1911
An Act to consolidate, amend, and extend certain enactments relating to Animals and to Knackers; and to make further provision with respect thereto.
Official Secrets Act 1911	1 & 2 Geo. 5. c. 28	22 August 1911
An Act to re-enact the Official Secrets Act, 1889, (Note: Official Secrets Act 1889 (52 & 53 Vict. c. 52)) with Amendments.
Parsonages Act 1911 (repealed)	1 & 2 Geo. 5. c. 29	22 August 1911
An Act to amend the Parsonages Act, 1838, (Note: Parsonages Act 1838 (1 & 2 Vict. c. 23)) and the Church Building Act, 1839. (Note: Church Building Act 1839 (2 & 3 Vict. c. 49)) (Repealed by Parsonages Measure 1930 (No. 1))
Public Health (Scotland) Act (1897) Amendment Act 1911 (repealed)	1 & 2 Geo. 5. c. 30	22 August 1911
An Act to extend the powers of the Public Health (Scotland) Act, 1897. (Note: Public Health (Scotland) Act 1897 (60 & 61 Vict. c. 38)) (Repealed by Water (Scotland) Act 1946 (9 & 10 Geo. 6. c. 42))
Merchandise Marks Act 1911 (repealed)	1 & 2 Geo. 5. c. 31	16 December 1911
An Act to amend Section sixteen of the Merchandise Marks Act, 1887. (Note: Merchandise Marks Act 1887 (50 & 51 Vict. c. 28)) (Repealed by Trade Descriptions Act 1968 (c. 29))
Education (Administrative Provisions) Act 1911 (repealed)	1 & 2 Geo. 5. c. 32	16 December 1911
An Act to make provision for the better administration by the Central and Local Authorities in England and Wales of the Enactments relating to Education. (Repealed by Statute Law (Repeals) Act 1975 (c. 10))
Isle of Man Harbours Act 1911 (repealed)	1 & 2 Geo. 5. c. 33	16 December 1911
An Act to amend the Law relating to the Harbours of the Isle of Man. (Repealed by Harbours (Isle of Man) Act 1961 (An Act of Tynwald))
Railway Companies (Accounts and Returns) Act 1911 (repealed)	1 & 2 Geo. 5. c. 34	16 December 1911
An Act to amend the Law with respect to the Accounts and Returns of Railway Companies. (Repealed by Statute Law Revision Act 1927 (17 & 18 Geo. 5. c. 42), Transport Charges &c. (Miscellaneous Provisions) Act 1954 (2 & 3 Eliz. 2. c. 64), Statute Law Revision Act 1960 (c. 56) and Transport Act 1962 (c. 46), for Northern Ireland by Transport (Northern Ireland) Order 1977 (SI 1977/599 (N.I. 10)) and for England and Wales and Scotland by Statute Law (Repeals) Act 2013 (c. 2))
Local Authorities (Ireland) (Qualification of Women) Act 1911 (repealed)	1 & 2 Geo. 5. c. 35	16 December 1911
An Act to enable Women to be elected and act as Members of County and Borough Councils in Ireland. (Repealed by Local Government (Members and Officers) Act (Northern Ireland) 1964 (c. 14 (N.I.)))
Pacific Cable Act 1911 (repealed)	1 & 2 Geo. 5. c. 36	16 December 1911
An Act to extend the Pacific Cable Act, 1901. (Note: Pacific Cable Act 1901 (1 Edw. 7. c. 31)) (Repealed by Pacific Cable Act 1927 (17 & 18 Geo. 5. c. 9))
Conveyancing Act 1911	1 & 2 Geo. 5. c. 37	16 December 1911
An Act to amend the Conveyancing and Law of Property Act, 1881. (Note: Conveyancing and Law of Property Act 1881 (44 & 45 Vict. c. 41)) (Repealed for England and Wales by Settled Land Act 1925 (15 & 16 Geo. 5. c. 18), Trustee Act 1925 (15 & 16 Geo. 5. c. 19) and Law of Property Act 1925 (15 & 16 Geo. 5. c. 20))
Money-lenders Act 1911 (repealed)	1 & 2 Geo. 5. c. 38	16 December 1911
An Act to amend the Money-lenders Act, 1900. (Note: Money-lenders Act 1900 (63 & 64 Vict. c. 51)) (Repealed for England and Wales and Scotland by Moneylenders Act 1927 (17 & 18 Geo. 5. c. 21) and Companies Act 1967 (c. 81) and for Northern Ireland by Moneylenders Act (Northern Ireland) 1933 (23 & 24 Geo. 5. c. 23 (N.I.)) and Moneylenders (Amendment) Act (Northern Ireland) 1969 (c. 27 (N.I.)))
Telegraph (Construction) Act 1911 (repealed)	1 & 2 Geo. 5. c. 39	16 December 1911
An Act to facilitate the construction and maintenance of Telegraphic Lines. (Repealed by Telecommunications Act 1984 (c. 12))
Lunacy Act 1911 (repealed)	1 & 2 Geo. 5. c. 40	16 December 1911
An Act to provide for the appointment of two additional Commissioners in Lunacy and to transfer the power of making Vesting Orders from the Judge in Lunacy to the High Court. (Repealed by Trustee Act 1925 (15 & 16 Geo. 5. c. 19) and Statute Law Revision Act 1927 (17 & 18 Geo. 5. c. 42))
Merchant Shipping (Stevedores and Trimmers) Act 1911 (repealed)	1 & 2 Geo. 5. c. 41	16 December 1911
An Act to enlarge the Remedies of Persons having claims for work done in connection with the stowing or discharging of ships' cargoes or the trimming of coal on board ships. (Repealed by Administration of Justice Act 1956 (4 & 5 Eliz. 2. c. 46))
Merchant Shipping Act 1911 (repealed)	1 & 2 Geo. 5. c. 42	16 December 1911
An Act to give jurisdiction under section seventy-six and Part VIII. of the Merchant Shipping Act, 1894, (Note: Merchant Shipping Act 1894 (57 & 58 Vict. c. 60)) to certain British Courts in foreign countries. (Repealed by Statute Law (Repeals) Act 1986 (c. 12))
University of Wales (Medical Graduates) Act 1911 (repealed)	1 & 2 Geo. 5. c. 43	16 December 1911
An Act to extend the provisions of the Medical Acts to the University of Wales and to Graduates in Medicine and Surgery thereof. (Repealed by Medical Act 1956 (4 & 5 Eliz. 2. c. 76))
Military Manoeuvres Act 1911 or the Military Manoeuvres Act 1911 (repealed)	1 & 2 Geo. 5. c. 44	16 December 1911
An Act to amend the Military Manœuvres Act, 1897. (Note: Military Manoeuvres Act 1897 (60 & 61 Vict. c. 43)) (Repealed for England and Wales and Scotland by Manœuvres Act 1958 (7 & 8 Eliz. 2. c. 7) and for Northern Ireland by Land Powers (Defence) Act 1958 (6 & 7 Eliz. 2. c. 30))
Public Roads (Ireland) Act 1911 (repealed)	1 & 2 Geo. 5. c. 45	16 December 1911
An Act to amend the Law in Ireland with respect to the use of Locomotives on Public Roads, and with respect to extraordinary Traffic. (Repealed by Statute Law Revision Act 1927 (17 & 18 Geo. 5. c. 42), Motor Vehicles and Road Traffic Act (Northern Ireland) 1934 (24 & 25 Geo. 5. c. 15 (N.I.)) and Road Traffic Act (Northern Ireland) 1955 (c. 27 (N.I.)))
Copyright Act 1911 (repealed)	1 & 2 Geo. 5. c. 46	16 December 1911
An Act to amend and consolidate the Law relating to Copyright. (Repealed by Copyright Act 1956 (4 & 5 Eliz. 2. c. 74), Statute Law (Repeals) Act 1986 (c. 12) and Legal Deposit Libraries Act 2003 (c. 28) and for Jersey by Copyright (Repeal of the Copyright Act 1911) (Jersey) Order 2012 (SI 2012/1753))
Naval Discipline (Dominion Naval Forces) Act 1911 (repealed)	1 & 2 Geo. 5. c. 47	16 December 1911
An Act to declare the effect of the Naval Discipline Acts when applied by the legislatures of self-governing Dominions to the Naval Forces raised by such Dominions. (Repealed by Naval Discipline Act 1957 (5 & 6 Eliz. 2. c. 53))
Finance Act 1911 (repealed)	1 & 2 Geo. 5. c. 48	16 December 1911
An Act to grant certain duties of Customs and Inland Revenue, to alter other duties, and to amend the Law relating to Customs and Inland Revenue (including Excise) and the National Debt, and to make other provisions for the financial arrangements of the year. (Repealed by Statute Law (Repeals) Act 2008 (c. 12))
Small Landholders (Scotland) Act 1911	1 & 2 Geo. 5. c. 49	16 December 1911
An Act to encourage the formation of Small Agricultural Holdings in Scotland, and to amend the Law relating to the Tenure of such Holdings (including Crofters' Holdings); to establish a Board of Agriculture for Scotland; and for other purposes connected therewith.
Coal Mines Act 1911 (repealed)	1 & 2 Geo. 5. c. 50	16 December 1911
An Act to consolidate and amend the Law relating to Coal Mines and certain other mines. (Repealed for England and Wales and Scotland by Mines and Quarries Act 1954 (2 & 3 Eliz. 2. c. 70) and for Northern Ireland by Mines Act (Northern Ireland) 1969 (c. 6 (N.I.)))
Burgh Police (Scotland) Amendment Act 1911 (repealed)	1 & 2 Geo. 5. c. 51	16 December 1911
An Act to amend the Burgh Police (Scotland) Acts so as to provide for the further Regulation of Places for Public Refreshment in Scotland. (Repealed by Local Government (Scotland) Act 1978 (c. 4))
Rag Flock Act 1911 (repealed)	1 & 2 Geo. 5. c. 52	16 December 1911
An Act to prohibit the sale and use for the purpose of the manufacture of certain articles of unclean Flock manufactured from Rags. (Repealed for England and Wales and Scotland by Rag Flock and Other Filling Materials Act 1951 (14 & 15 Geo. 6. c. 63) and for Northern Ireland by Deregulation (Northern Ireland) Order 1997 (SI 1997/2984 (N.I. 22)))
House Letting and Rating (Scotland) Act 1911 (repealed)	1 & 2 Geo. 5. c. 53	16 December 1911
An Act to amend the Law as to the Letting and Rating of small Dwelling-houses in Scotland; and for other purposes relating thereto. (Repealed by Local Government (Scotland) Act 1973 (c. 65))
Shops Act 1911 (repealed)	1 & 2 Geo. 5. c. 54	16 December 1911
An Act to amend and extend the Shops Regulation Acts, 1892 to 1904. (Repealed by Shops Act 1912 (2 & 3 Geo. 5. c. 3))
National Insurance Act 1911 (repealed)	1 & 2 Geo. 5. c. 55	16 December 1911
An Act to provide for Insurance against Loss of Health and for the Prevention and Cure of Sickness and for Insurance against Unemployment, and for purposes incidental thereto. (Repealed by Unemployment Insurance Act 1920 (10 & 11 Geo. 5. c. 30), National Health Insurance Act 1924 (14 & 15 Geo. 5. c. 38), National Health Insurance Act 1936 (26 Geo. 5 & 1 Edw. 8. c. 32), Public Health Act 1936 (26 Geo. 5 & 1 Edw. 8. c. 49), Public Health (London) Act 1936 (26 Geo. 5 & 1 Edw. 8. c. 50), for Scotland by National Health Service (Scotland) Act 1947 (10 & 11 Geo. 6. c. 27) and Local Government (Scotland) Act 1947 (10 & 11 Geo. 6. c. 43), for Great Britain by Statute Law Revision Act 1950 (14 Geo. 6. c. 6) and for Northern Ireland by Statute Law Revision Act (Northern Ireland) 1954 (c. 35 (N.I.)))
Telephone Transfer Amendment Act 1911 (repealed)	1 & 2 Geo. 5. c. 56	16 December 1911
An Act to amend the Telephone Transfer Act, 1911, (Note: Telephone Transfer Act 1911 (1 & 2 Geo. 5. c. 26)) so as to authorise a payment to be made to the National Telephone Company, Limited, of a sum on account of the Telephone Purchase Money before the amount thereof is finally ascertained. (Repealed by Statute Law Revision Act 1927 (17 & 18 Geo. 5. c. 42))
Maritime Conventions Act 1911 (repealed)	1 & 2 Geo. 5. c. 57	16 December 1911
An Act to amend the Law relating to Merchant Shipping with a view to enabling certain Conventions to be carried into effect. (Repealed by Statute Law Revision Act 1927 (17 & 18 Geo. 5. c. 42) and Merchant Shipping Act 1995 (c. 21))
Resident Magistrates (Belfast) Act 1911	1 & 2 Geo. 5. c. 58	16 December 1911
An Act to amend the Law with respect to the salaries, superannuation, appointment, and powers of Resident Magistrates for the city of Belfast.

=== Local acts ===
Short title	Citation	Royal assent
Long title
Paisley Corporation Order Confirmation Act 1911	1 & 2 Geo. 5. c. i	29 March 1911
An Act to confirm a Provisional Order under the Private Legislation Procedure (Scotland) Act 1899 (Note: Private Legislation Procedure (Scotland) Act 1899 (62 & 63 Vict. c. 47)) relating to Paisley Corporation.
	Paisley Corporation Order 1911 Provisional Order to authorise the Corporation of the burgh of Paisley to excamb a portion of the lands of Carriagehill to amend the law relating to the levying and recovery of assessments within the burgh to provide for the filling up of casual vacancies in the Corporation and for other purposes.	
Ayrshire (Loch Bradan) Water Distribution Order Confirmation Act 1911	1 & 2 Geo. 5. c. ii	29 March 1911
An Act to confirm a Provisional Order under the Private Legislation Procedure (Scotland) Act 1899 relating to Ayrshire (Loch Bradan) Water Distribution.
	Ayrshire (Loch Bradan) Water Distribution Order 1911 Provisional Order to authorise the District Committees of the Ayr and Kilmarnock Districts of the county of Ayr to supply water within their districts under the Public Health (Scotland) Act 1897 (Note: Public Health (Scotland) Act 1897 (60 & 61 Vict. c. 38)) to define the special water supply district and to constitute such district a Special Water Supply District under that Act to authorise and require the County Council of the county of Ayr to levy assessments and to borrow money for the purposes of such water supply to authorise the Town Council of the burgh of Troon to borrow money and for other purposes.	
Irvine Burgh Order Confirmation Act 1911	1 & 2 Geo. 5. c. iii	29 March 1911
An Act to confirm a Provisional Order under the Private Legislation Procedure (Scotland) Act 1899 relating to Irvine Burgh.
	Irvine Burgh Order 1911 Provisional Order for empowering the Corporation of the Burgh of Irvine to construct a bridge across the River Irvine with roads of access thereto to borrow money and for other purposes.	
Military Lands Provisional Order (1910) Confirmation Act 1911 (repealed)	1 & 2 Geo. 5. c. iv	29 March 1911
An Act to confirm a Provisional Order of the Secretary of State under the Military Lands Act 1892. (Note: Military Lands Act 1892 (55 & 56 Vict. c. 43)) (Repealed by Statute Law (Repeals) Act 2008 (c. 12))
	Holcombe Rifle Ranges Order 1910 (Note: Although passed in 1911, the short title is specified as the Holcombe Rifle Ranges Order 1910.) A Provisional Order made in pursuance of section two of the Military Lands Act 1892 authorising the purchase by the Territorial Force Association of the County of Lancaster of land for the provision of rifle ranges and for other military purposes.	
Southampton Corporation Tramways Act 1911	1 & 2 Geo. 5. c. v	31 March 1911
An Act to confer further powers upon the mayor aldermen and burgesses of the borough of Southampton in connection with their tramway undertaking and for other purposes.
Great Northern Railway (Ireland) Act 1911	1 & 2 Geo. 5. c. vi	28 April 1911
An Act to confer further powers upon the Great Northern Railway Company (Ireland) to vest in that Company the undertaking of the Castleblayney Keady and Armagh Railway Company and for other purposes.
Chesham and District Gas Act 1911	1 & 2 Geo. 5. c. vii	2 June 1911
An Act for incorporating and conferring powers on the Chesham and District Gas Company and for other purposes.
Coventry Corporation Act 1911	1 & 2 Geo. 5. c. viii	2 June 1911
An Act to authorise the mayor aldermen and citizens of the city of Coventry to construct street works to extend the limit of the library rate and to make further provision with regard to the health local government and improvement of the city and for other purposes.
Felixstowe and Walton Waterworks Act 1911	1 & 2 Geo. 5. c. ix	2 June 1911
An Act to confer further powers on the Felixstowe and Walton Waterworks Company and for other purposes.
Warrington Corporation Act 1911	1 & 2 Geo. 5. c. x	2 June 1911
An Act to empower the Corporation of Warrington to construct bridges street improvements and other works to make further and better provision with regard to the gas and electricity undertakings of the Corporation and the improvement health and local government of the borough and for other purposes.
London United Tramways Act 1911	1 & 2 Geo. 5. c. xi	2 June 1911
An Act to extend the time limited for the compulsory purchase of certain lands and the construction of certain works by the London United Tramways Limited and for other purposes.
Furness Railway Act 1911	1 & 2 Geo. 5. c. xii	2 June 1911
An Act to extend the time for the sale of certain lands.
Weston-super-Mare Gas Act 1911	1 & 2 Geo. 5. c. xiii	2 June 1911
An Act for conferring further powers on the Weston-super-Mare Gaslight Company and for other purposes.
Chichester Gas Act 1911	1 & 2 Geo. 5. c. xiv	2 June 1911
An Act to extend the limits of supply of the City of Chichester Gas Company to authorise that Company to raise additional capital and for other purposes.
Manchester and Milford Railway (Vesting) Act 1911	1 & 2 Geo. 5. c. xv	2 June 1911
An Act for amalgamating the undertaking of the Manchester and Milford Railway Company with the undertaking of the Great Western Railway Company and for other purposes.
Luton Water Act 1911	1 & 2 Geo. 5. c. xvi	2 June 1911
An Act to authorise the Luton Water Company to acquire additional land by agreement for the general purposes of their undertaking to raise further capital and for other purposes.
London Cemetery Company Act 1911	1 & 2 Geo. 5. c. xvii	2 June 1911
An Act to rearrange reduce and fix the capital of the London Cemetery Company and to confirm past issues of paid up shares and issues of shares at a discount and past distributions of capital and dividends and to extend the Company's power to acquire and hold land and for other purposes.
Swinton Urban District Council Act 1911	1 & 2 Geo. 5. c. xviii	2 June 1911
An Act to authorise the Swinton Urban District Council to construct additional waterworks and for other purposes.
Seaforth and Sefton Junction Railway Act 1911	1 & 2 Geo. 5. c. xix	2 June 1911
An Act to extend the time for the compulsory purchase of lands and for the completion of the railways and works of the Seaforth and Sefton Junction Railway Company to provide for the leasing of the said railways to the Great Central and Great Northern Railway Companies jointly and for other purposes.
Slough Urban District Water Act 1911 (repealed)	1 & 2 Geo. 5. c. xx	2 June 1911
An Act to authorise the urban district council of Slough to purchase the undertaking of the Slough Waterworks Company and to supply water within the urban district of Slough and the neighbourhood thereof and for other purposes in connexion therewith. (Repealed by Middle Thames Water Board Order 1966 (SI 1966/214))
Dover Corporation Act 1911 (repealed)	1 & 2 Geo. 5. c. xxi	2 June 1911
An Act to further extend the period for taking lands and for the construction of street works and a tramway authorised by the Dover Corporation Act 1901 (Note: Dover Corporation Act 1901 (1 Edw. 7. c. ccxliii)) and for other purposes. (Repealed by County of Kent Act 1981 (c. xviii))
Hebburn Urban District Council Act 1911 (repealed)	1 & 2 Geo. 5. c. xxii	2 June 1911
An Act to authorise the Hebburn Urban District Council to construct a new street in their district and to make further provision in regard to the health local government and improvement of the district and for other purposes. (Repealed by Tyne & Wear Act 1980 (c. xliii))
Upper Medway Navigation and Conservancy Act 1911	1 & 2 Geo. 5. c. xxiii	2 June 1911
An Act to provide for the constitution and incorporation of a Board of Conservators for the preservation maintenance and improvement of the Upper Medway to acquire the undertaking of the Medway (Upper) Navigation Company and for other purposes.
Charles Sheils' Charity Act 1911	1 & 2 Geo. 5. c. xxiv	2 June 1911
An Act for amending Charles Sheils' Almshouses Charity Act 1864 (Note: Charles Sheils' Almshouses Charity Act 1864 (27 & 28 Vict. c. 8 Pr.)) Charles Sheils' Almshouses Charity Act 1866 (Note: Charles Sheils' Almshouses Charity Act 1866 (29 & 30 Vict. c. 9 Pr.)) and Charles Sheils' Charity Act 1875. (Note: Charles Sheils' Charity Act 1875 (38 & 39 Vict. c. 7 Pr.))
Western Valleys (Monmouthshire) Sewerage Board Act 1911	1 & 2 Geo. 5. c. xxv	2 June 1911
An Act to confer further powers on the Western Valleys (Monmouthshire) Sewerage Board.
Ely Rural District Water Act 1911	1 & 2 Geo. 5. c. xxvi	2 June 1911
An Act to incorporate the Ely Rural District Water Company and to confer powers upon that Company in connexion with the supply of water.
Port of London Act 1911	1 & 2 Geo. 5. c. xxvii	2 June 1911
An Act to authorise the Port of London Authority to acquire compulsorily lands in the city of London and for other purposes.
Blackburn Corporation Water Act 1911	1 & 2 Geo. 5. c. xxviii	2 June 1911
An Act to sanction and confirm the construction of works and to authorise the construction of additional works in relation to their water undertaking by the Corporation of Blackburn to amend and extend former Acts relating to the borough of Blackburn to confer further powers with respect to the supply of water to authorise the Corporation to borrow money and for other purposes.
London Electric Railway Act 1911	1 & 2 Geo. 5. c. xxix	2 June 1911
An Act to empower the London Electric Railway Company to construct new railways and for other purposes.
Sligo Corporation Act 1911	1 & 2 Geo. 5. c. xxx	2 June 1911
An Act to confer further powers on the mayor aldermen and burgesses of Sligo with regard to borrowing and for other purposes.
Metropolitan District Railway Act 1911	1 & 2 Geo. 5. c. xxxi	2 June 1911
An Act to incorporate a Joint Committee of the Metropolitan District Railway Company and the London Electric Railway Company and to empower it to purchase the generating station of the Underground Electric Railways Company of London Limited at Lots Road Chelsea and to raise money therefor and to lease the same to the Metropolitan District Railway Company and the London Electric Railway Company and to authorise the Metropolitan District Railway Company to construct new railways and for other purposes.
Tamworth Gas Act 1911	1 & 2 Geo. 5. c. xxxii	2 June 1911
An Act to confer further powers upon the Tamworth Gaslight and Coke Company.
St. Andrew's Ambulance Association Order Confirmation Act 1911 (repealed)	1 & 2 Geo. 5. c. xxxiii	2 June 1911
An Act to confirm a Provisional Order under the Private Legislation Procedure (Scotland) Act 1899 relating to the St Andrew's Ambulance Association. (Repealed by Statute Law (Repeals) Act 1998 (c. 43))
	St. Andrew's Ambulance Association Order 1911 Provisional Order to authorise the St. Andrew's Ambulance Association to transfer a portion of the Red Cross Fund held by the said Association to the Scottish Branch of the British Red Cross Society to discharge the said Association in respect of and to sanction and confirm payments made to the said Scottish Branch and for other purposes.	
Christ Church Glasgow Order Confirmation Act 1911	1 & 2 Geo. 5. c. xxxiv	2 June 1911
An Act to confirm a Provisional Order under the Private Legislation Procedure (Scotland) Act 1899 relating to Christ Church Glasgow.
	Christ Church Glasgow Order 1911 Provisional Order to authorise the Trustees of the Church and ground known as Christ Church Glasgow to erect certain buildings and to use the same or permit the same to be used in connexion with the work of the Scottish Episcopal Church in the East End of Glasgow and for other purposes.	
Local Government Board's Provisional Order (1910) Confirmation (No. 12) Act 1911	1 & 2 Geo. 5. c. xxxv	2 June 1911
An Act to confirm a Provisional Order of the Local Government Board relating to Bath.
	Bath (Extension) Order 1911 Provisional Order made in pursuance of Sections 54 and 59 of the Local Government Act 1888. (Note: Local Government Act 1888 (51 & 52 Vict. c. 41))	
Local Government Board's Provisional Order (1910) Confirmation (No. 13) Act 1911 or the Greater Birmingham Act 1911 (repealed)	1 & 2 Geo. 5. c. xxxvi	2 June 1911
An Act to confirm a Provisional Order of the Local Government Board relating to Birmingham. (Repealed by West Midlands County Council Act 1980 (c. xi))
	Birmingham (Extension) Order 1911 Provisional Order made in pursuance of Sections 54 55 and 59 of the Local Government Act 1888.	
Provisional Order (Marriages) Confirmation Act 1911 (repealed)	1 & 2 Geo. 5. c. xxxvii	2 June 1911
An Act to confirm a Provisional Order made by one of His Majesty's Principal Secretaries of State under the Provisional Order (Marriages) Act 1905. (Note: Provisional Order (Marriages) Act 1905 (5 Edw. 7. c. 23)) (Repealed by Statute Law (Repeals) Act 1977 (c. 18))
	Thorpe Acre Dishley Order.	
Dundee Water Order Confirmation Act 1911 (repealed)	1 & 2 Geo. 5. c. xxxviii	29 June 1911
An Act to confirm a Provisional Order under the Private Legislation Procedure (Scotland) Act 1899 relating to Dundee Water. (Repealed by Dundee Corporation (Water, Transport, Finance, &c.) Order Confirmation Act 1954 (2 & 3 Eliz. 2. c.ix))
	Dundee Water Order 1911 Provisional Order to empower the Dundee Water Commissioners to extend enlarge and alter their Lintrathen Reservoir and Works connected therewith and construct other Works and for other purposes.	
Hastings Corporation (Water and Finance) Act 1911	1 & 2 Geo. 5. c. xxxix	29 June 1911
An Act to confer further powers upon the Corporation of the county borough of Hastings with respect to the water supply to the borough and to authorise the Corporation to construct additional waterworks and borrow money and to make provision as to the audit of the accounts of the Corporation and for other purposes.
London, Brighton and South Coast Railway (Steam Vessels) Act 1911	1 & 2 Geo. 5. c. xl	29 June 1911
An Act to authorise the London Brighton and South Coast Railway Company to provide and work steam and other vessels between Newhaven and certain continental ports and places and for other purposes.
Luton Gas Act 1911	1 & 2 Geo. 5. c. xli	29 June 1911
An Act for conferring further powers upon the Luton Gas Company.
Enfield Gas Act 1911	1 & 2 Geo. 5. c. xlii	29 June 1911
An Act to confer further powers upon the Enfield Gas Company.
Rhymney Railway Act 1911	1 & 2 Geo. 5. c. xliii	29 June 1911
An Act to confer further powers upon the Rhymney Railway Company for the construction of works the acquisition of additional lands and for other purposes.
Bristol Corporation Act 1911	1 & 2 Geo. 5. c. xliv	29 June 1911
An Act to authorise the enlargement of certain cemeteries in the city of Bristol to confer further powers upon the lord mayor aldermen and burgesses of that city in relation to their dock undertaking and for other purposes.
Chesterfield Gas and Water Board Act 1911 (repealed)	1 & 2 Geo. 5. c. xlv	29 June 1911
An Act to authorise the Chesterfield Gas and Water Board to make new waterworks and for other purposes. (Repealed by Post Office Act 1969 (c. 48))
Gas Light and Coke Company's Act 1911	1 & 2 Geo. 5. c. xlvi	29 June 1911
An Act to authorise the acquisition by the Gas Light and Coke Company of the undertakings of the Barking Gas Company and the Chigwell Loughton and Woodford Gas Company to confer further powers on the Gas Light and Coke Company and for other purposes.
Metropolitan Electric Supply Company (Acton District) Act 1911	1 & 2 Geo. 5. c. xlvii	29 June 1911
An Act to authorise the transfer to the Metropolitan Electric Supply Company Limited of the Electrical Undertaking of the Urban District Council of Acton and for other purposes.
Rhôs-on-Sea Pier Act 1911 (repealed)	1 & 2 Geo. 5. c. xlviii	29 June 1911
An Act for confirming the construction of a pier and works known as the Rhôs-on-Sea Pier and authorising the construction of new works and conveniences connected therewith and for other purposes. (Repealed by Clwyd County Council Act 1985 (c. xliv))
West Cheshire Water Act 1911	1 & 2 Geo. 5. c. xlix	29 June 1911
An Act to sanction and confirm the construction by the West Cheshire Water Company of existing works in the hundred of Wirral and county of Chester to authorise that Company to raise additional capital and for other purposes.
Wirral Waterworks Act 1911	1 & 2 Geo. 5. c. l	29 June 1911
An Act to sanction and confirm the construction by the Wirral Waterworks Company of existing works to authorise that Company to raise additional capital and for other purposes.
Clyde Navigation Act 1911	1 & 2 Geo. 5. c. li	29 June 1911
An Act to authorise the Trustees of the Clyde Navigation to construct a tidal dock graving dock and other works on the River Clyde at Renfrew to borrow additional money and for other purposes.
Harrogate Corporation Water Act 1911 (repealed)	1 & 2 Geo. 5. c. lii	29 June 1911
An Act to enlarge the time for the construction of certain works authorised by the Harrogate Water Act 1901 (Note: Harrogate Water Act 1901 (1 Edw. 7. c. ccxv)) to confer further powers upon the mayor aldermen and burgesses of the borough of Harrogate in regard to their water undertaking and for other purposes. (Repealed by Harrogate Stray Act 1985 (c. xxii))
Ashborne and District Gas Act 1911	1 & 2 Geo. 5. c. liii	18 August 1911
An Act for incorporating and conferring powers on the Ashborne Gas Company.
Paignton Urban District Council Act 1911	1 & 2 Geo. 5. c. liv	18 August 1911
An Act to authorise the Paignton Urban District Council to construct additional waterworks to make further provision with respect to the water supply and local government of the district and for other purposes.
South Lancashire Tramways Act 1911 (repealed)	1 & 2 Geo. 5. c. lv	18 August 1911
An Act to authorise the South Lancashire Tramways Company to construct additional tramways and other works and for other purposes. (Repealed by South Lancashire Transport Act 1958 (6 & 7 Eliz. 2. c. xxxiii))
Manchester Ship Canal Act 1911	1 & 2 Geo. 5. c. lvi	18 August 1911
An Act to empower the Manchester Ship Canal Company to construct a pier or jetty to confer further powers upon that Company and for other purposes.
Thames Conservancy Act 1911 (repealed)	1 & 2 Geo. 5. c. lvii	18 August 1911
An Act to amend and consolidate the enactments relating to the abstraction of water from the River Thames by the Metropolitan Water Board and the payments made by that board to the Conservators of the River Thames and for other purposes. (Repealed by Thames Conservancy Act 1932 (22 & 23 Geo. 5. c. xxxvii))
Southampton Harbour Act 1911	1 & 2 Geo. 5. c. lviii	18 August 1911
An Act for conferring further powers upon the Southampton Harbour Board and for other purposes.
Chasetown Gas Act 1911	1 & 2 Geo. 5. c. lix	18 August 1911
An Act to dissolve and reincorporate the Chasetown Gas Company Limited and for other purposes.
London, Brighton and South Coast Railway Act 1911	1 & 2 Geo. 5. c. lx	18 August 1911
An Act to confer further powers on the London Brighton and South Coast Railway Company to make provision with respect to the construction of a subway at Norwood Junction in the county borough of Croydon.
Oystermouth Urban District Council (Water) Act 1911	1 & 2 Geo. 5. c. lxi	18 August 1911
An Act to transfer to and vest in the Council of the urban district of Oystermouth the undertaking of the Oystermouth and District Waterworks Company Limited to authorise the Council to maintain the existing waterworks and construct new works and to supply water within the urban district of Oystermouth and adjacent places and for other purposes.
Lloyd's Act 1911	1 & 2 Geo. 5. c. lxii	18 August 1911
An Act to extend the objects of and confer further powers on Lloyd's and to amend the Lloyd's Act 1871. (Note: Lloyd's Act 1871 (34 & 35 Vict. c. xxi))
London County Council (General Powers) Act 1911	1 & 2 Geo. 5. c. lxiii	18 August 1911
An Act to make provision with respect to the superannuation of certain members of the staff of the London County Council to extend the time limited for the construction of certain authorised works to make further provisions with respect to matters of local government and for other purposes.
Northampton Corporation Act 1911 (repealed)	1 & 2 Geo. 5. c. lxiv	18 August 1911
An Act for conferring further powers upon the Corporation of Northampton with reference to their tramway undertaking to authorise the construction of street widenings and to make better provision for the health local government and finance of the borough of Northampton and for other purposes. (Repealed by Northampton Act 1988 (c. xxix))
Widnes and Runcorn Bridge (Transfer) Act 1911	1 & 2 Geo. 5. c. lxv	18 August 1911
An Act to transfer to the mayor aldermen and burgesses of the borough of Widnes the undertaking of the Widnes and Runcorn Bridge Company and to confer powers on them with respect thereto and for other purposes.
Chapel Whaley and District Gas Act 1911	1 & 2 Geo. 5. c. lxvi	18 August 1911
An Act to incorporate and confer powers on the Chapel Whaley and District Gas Company and for other purposes.
Winchester Corporation (Electric Supply) Act 1911	1 & 2 Geo. 5. c. lxvii	18 August 1911
An Act to confer powers upon the corporation of Winchester in relation to their acquisition of the under taking of the Winchester Electric Light and Power Company Limited and to the supply of electricity and for other purposes in connexion therewith.
Sidmouth Gas and Electricity Act 1911	1 & 2 Geo. 5. c. lxviii	18 August 1911
An Act for incorporating and conferring powers on the Sidmouth Gas and Electricity Company.
Star Assurance Society's Act 1911	1 & 2 Geo. 5. c. lxix	18 August 1911
An Act to incorporate the Star Life Assurance Society under the name of "The Star Assurance Society" provide for the management of its affairs and to confer further powers on the Society and for other purposes.
Dover Graving Dock Act 1911 (repealed)	1 & 2 Geo. 5. c. lxx	18 August 1911
An Act to extend the periods for the compulsory purchase of lands for and for the construction and completion of the graving dock and works authorised by the Dover Graving Dock Act 1908. (Note: Dover Graving Dock Act 1908 (8 Edw. 7. c. cxi)) (Repealed by Dover Harbour Act 1953 (1 & 2 Eliz. 2. c. xxix))
Liverpool Overhead Railway Act 1911 (repealed)	1 & 2 Geo. 5. c. lxxi	18 August 1911
An Act to confer further powers upon the Liverpool Overhead Railway Company with respect to their loan capital and for other purposes. (Repealed by Liverpool Overhead Railway Act 1956 (4 & 5 Eliz. 2. c. lxxxii))
Alexandra (Newport and South Wales) Docks and Railway Act 1911	1 & 2 Geo. 5. c. lxxii	18 August 1911
An Act to authorise the Alexandra (Newport and South Wales) Docks and Railway Company to construct new railways in the county of Monmouth to raise additional capital and for other purposes.
Metropolitan Railway Act 1911	1 & 2 Geo. 5. c. lxxiii	18 August 1911
An Act to authorise the Metropolitan Railway Company to construct a widening of their railway and a subway for foot passengers and for other purposes.
Milford Docks Act 1911 (repealed)	1 & 2 Geo. 5. c. lxxiv	18 August 1911
An Act to extend the time limited for the completion of certain works to enable the Milford Docks Company to acquire lands compulsorily and for other purposes. (Repealed by Milford Docks Act 1953 (1 & 2 Eliz. 2. c. x))
South Western Railway Act 1911	1 & 2 Geo. 5. c. lxxv	18 August 1911
An Act to empower the London and South Western Railway Company to construct new street and other works and to acquire additional lands to authorise the abandonment of existing works of the Company and the South Eastern Railway Company to confer further powers on the Company and other companies in respect of superfluous lands to provide for the transfer to the Company of the undertaking of the Budleigh Salterton Railway Company and for other purposes.
Bristol Tramways Act 1911	1 & 2 Geo. 5. c. lxxvi	18 August 1911
An Act to revive and extend the powers for the acquisition of lands and to extend the time for the construction of certain authorised tramways of the Bristol Tramways and Carriage Company Limited and for other purposes.
Chester Waterworks Act 1911	1 & 2 Geo. 5. c. lxxvii	18 August 1911
An Act to authorise the to authorise the Chester Waterworks Company to construct new works to sanction and confirm the construction of existing works to raise additional capital and to consolidate their existing capital and for other purposes.
Hornsea Urban District Council Act 1911 (repealed)	1 & 2 Geo. 5. c. lxxviii	18 August 1911
An Act to confer upon the Hornsea Urban District Council powers in relation to the Promenade Gardens and to make further provision for the water supply local government health and improvement of the district. (Repealed by Humberside Act 1982 (c. iii))
Great Northern Railway Act 1911	1 & 2 Geo. 5. c. lxxix	18 August 1911
An Act to authorise the Great Northern Railway Company to construct new railways and works and to acquire lands and to confer further powers upon that Company to authorise the construction of works at Peterborough by the Great Northern Railway Company to authorise the construction of widenings and other works and the acquisition of lands by the Great Northern Railway Company and the Great Central Railway Company to confirm the purchase of certain lands by the Great Northern and Great Eastern Joint Committee to authorise the acquisition by the Great Northern Railway Company of the undertaking of the Muswell Hill and Palace Railway Company and for other purposes.
Dundee Harbour and Tay Ferries Consolidation Act 1911 (repealed)	1 & 2 Geo. 5. c. lxxx	18 August 1911
An Act to consolidate with amendments the Acts relating to the harbour of Dundee and the Tay Ferries to reconstitute and re-incorporate the trustees and for other purposes. (Repealed by Dundee Harbour and Tay Ferries Order Confirmation Act 1952 (15 & 16 Geo. 6 & 1 Eliz. 2. c. xx))
Handsworth Urban District Council Act 1911	1 & 2 Geo. 5. c. lxxxi	18 August 1911
An Act for conferring further powers upon the urban district council of Handsworth with reference to their tramway undertaking to authorise the construction of new streets and widenings and for other purposes.
Marple Urban District Council Gas Act 1911	1 & 2 Geo. 5. c. lxxxii	18 August 1911
An Act to confer further powers on the Marple Urban District Council with regard to their gas undertaking and for other purposes.
Central London Railway Act 1911	1 & 2 Geo. 5. c. lxxxiii	18 August 1911
An Act to impower the Central London Railway Company to construct new railways to authorise arrangements between the Company and the Great Western Railway Company and for other purposes.
City of London (Various Powers) Act 1911	1 & 2 Geo. 5. c. lxxxiv	18 August 1911
An Act to authorise the transfer to the Corporation of the City of London of moneys forming part of the trophy tax to confer further powers on the Corporation in reference to Bunhill Fields Burial Ground and in reference to the working of the tramway of the Corporation authorised by the Foreign Cattle Market Deptford Act 1898 (Note: Foreign Cattle Market Deptford Act 1898 (61 & 62 Vict. c. li)) to confer further powers on the Corporation with respect to the control of streets and structures in streets and buildings and in reference to repair of streets to enable the Corporation to enter into agreements with the Stepney Borough Council in reference to the special rate leviable in the city under the Great Tower Hill Act 1869 (Note: Great Tower Hill Act 1869 (32 & 33 Vict. c. xii)) to make further provisions for the health and good government of the city to empower the Corporation to borrow money and for other purposes.
Great Western Railway Act 1911	1 & 2 Geo. 5. c. lxxxv	18 August 1911
An Act for empowering the Great Western Railway Company to construct new railways in the counties of Glamorgan and Carmarthen and for other purposes.
Kingston-upon-Hull Corporation Act 1911	1 & 2 Geo. 5. c. lxxxvi	18 August 1911
An Act to confer further powers upon the mayor aldermen and citizens of the city and county of Kingston-upon-Hull in regard to their tramway and water undertakings and for other purposes.
Luton Corporation Act 1911	1 & 2 Geo. 5. c. lxxxvii	18 August 1911
An Act to confirm and give effect to an agreement for the acquisition by the mayor aldermen and burgesses of the borough of Luton of the franchises and rights of market and market tolls and right of holding fairs of the lord of the manor of Luton to authorise the removal of the existing market to make further provision with regard to the health local government and improvement of the borough and for other purposes.
Nottinghamshire and Derbyshire Tramways Act 1911 (repealed)	1 & 2 Geo. 5. c. lxxxviii	18 August 1911
An Act to authorise the Nottinghamshire and Derbyshire Tramways Company to acquire additional lands for road widenings and improvements in connection with their authorised tramways to revive the powers and extend the time for the purchase of lands and for the construction and completion of certain tramways and works authorised by the Nottinghamshire and Derbyshire Tramways Act 1903 (Note: Nottinghamshire and Derbyshire Tramways Act 1903 (3 Edw. 7. c. ccii)) extension of time for the purchase of lands for the further tramways and works authorised by the Nottinghamshire and Derbyshire Tramways Act 1908 (Note: Nottinghamshire and Derbyshire Tramways Act 1908 (8 Edw. 7. c. ci)) abandonment of certain tramways authorised by the Act of 1903 and for other purposes. (Repealed by Statute Law (Repeals) Act 1995 (c. 44))
Kingston-upon-Thames Bridge Act 1911 (repealed)	1 & 2 Geo. 5. c. lxxxix	18 August 1911
An Act to vest Kingston-upon-Thames Bridge together with the Bridge Estate Charity in the county councils of the administrative counties of Middlesex and Surrey to empower those Councils to widen the bridge and to widen and improve the approaches thereto at each end thereof and to execute other works in connection therewith and for other purposes. (Repealed by Middlesex County Council Act 1944 (7 & 8 Geo. 6. c.xxi))
Penllwyn Railway Act 1911	1 & 2 Geo. 5. c. xc	18 August 1911
An Act to extend the time for the construction of the railway authorised by the Penllwyn Railway Act 1906 (Note: Penllwyn Railway Act 1906 (6 Edw. 7. c. lxx)) and for other purposes.
Middlesbrough, Stockton-on-Tees and Thornaby Tramways Act 1911 (repealed)	1 & 2 Geo. 5. c. xci	18 August 1911
An Act to extend the time for the construction of certain authorised tramways of the Imperial Tramways Company Limited and to revive the powers and extend the time for the acquisition of lands in connection therewith and for other purposes. (Repealed by Tramways Orders Confirmation Act 1919 (9 & 10 Geo. 5. c. xc))
Gloucester Corporation Act 1911	1 & 2 Geo. 5. c. xcii	18 August 1911
An Act to empower the Corporation of Gloucester to construct additional waterworks and street improvements to confer further powers with respect to markets and the supply of electricity and to make better provision for the health local government and improvement of the city and for other purposes.
Metropolitan Electric Tramways Act 1911	1 & 2 Geo. 5. c. xciii	18 August 1911
An Act to empower the Metropolitan Electric Tramways Limited to construct a bridge over the Old River Lee and new tramways and other works to widen certain streets and roads and for other purposes.
North Eastern Railway Act 1911	1 & 2 Geo. 5. c. xciv	18 August 1911
An Act to confer additional powers upon the North Eastern Railway Company for the construction of new railways and other works and the acquisition of lands and for other purposes.
Barry Railway Act 1911	1 & 2 Geo. 5. c. xcv	18 August 1911
An Act to enable the Barry Railway Company to construct railways in the county of Monmouth and for other purposes Barry Railway.
London, Tilbury and Southend Railway Act 1911	1 & 2 Geo. 5. c. xcvi	18 August 1911
An Act to confer further powers upon the London Tilbury and Southend Railway Company with respect to the electrical working of their railways and otherwise.
Merthyr Tydfil Corporation Water Act 1911	1 & 2 Geo. 5. c. xcvii	18 August 1911
An Act to empower the Corporation of Merthyr Tydfil to construct additional waterworks and to make further provision in regard to their water undertaking and for other purposes.
Swansea Gas Act 1911	1 & 2 Geo. 5. c. xcviii	18 August 1911
An Act for conferring further powers on the Swansea Gas Light Company.
Great Yarmouth Port and Haven Act 1911	1 & 2 Geo. 5. c. xcix	18 August 1911
An Act to alter the constitution of the Great Yarmouth Port and Haven Commissioners to authorise the Commissioners to construct a dock and other works to acquire the fish wharf undertaking of the corporation of Great Yarmouth to acquire lands and for other purposes.
Midland Railway Act 1911	1 & 2 Geo. 5. c. c	18 August 1911
An Act to confer additional powers upon the Midland Railway Company for the construction of works and upon that Company the Midland and Great Northern Railways Joint Committee and the Cheshire Lines Committee for the acquisition of lands and for other purposes.
Paddington Borough Council (Superannuation and Pensions) Act 1911	1 & 2 Geo. 5. c. ci	18 August 1911
An Act to provide for the granting of superannuation allowances to the officers and pensions to the servants of the Council of the metropolitan borough of Paddington and for other purposes.
Poplar Borough Council (Superannuation and Pensions) Act 1911 (repealed)	1 & 2 Geo. 5. c. cii	18 August 1911
An Act to provide for the granting of superannuation allowances to the officers and pensions to the servants of the Council of the metropolitan borough of Poplar and for other purposes. (Repealed by London Authorities (Superannuation) (Amendment) Order 1967 (SI 1967/1330))
Rhondda Urban District Council Act 1911 (repealed)	1 & 2 Geo. 5. c. ciii	18 August 1911
An Act to authorise the Rhondda Urban District Council to construct additional waterworks and to confer further powers upon the Council in regard to their water undertaking and the supply of electricity and for other purposes. (Repealed by Rhondda Corporation Act 1973 (c. xxiii))
Dunfermline Burgh Extension and Drainage Act 1911	1 & 2 Geo. 5. c. civ	18 August 1911
An Act to extend the boundaries of the city and royal burgh of Dunfermline to authorise the provost magistrates and councillors of the said burgh to construct and maintain sewers drains and works to acquire lands for those purposes to hold and use lands for gasworks to alter the tenure of the office of town clerk to alter the limit of the public libraries rate and for other purposes.
Ipswich Corporation Act 1911	1 & 2 Geo. 5. c. cv	18 August 1911
An Act to authorise the mayor aldermen and burgesses of the borough of Ipswich to construct additional water works and to make further provision in regard to their water undertaking and the health local government and improvement of the Borough and for other purposes.
London County Council (Tramways and Improvements) Act 1911	1 & 2 Geo. 5. c. cvi	18 August 1911
An Act to empower the London County Council to construct and work new tramways to alter and reconstruct existing tramways and to make street improvements and other works and for other purposes.
Woking Urban District Council (Basingstoke Canal) Act 1911	1 & 2 Geo. 5. c. cvii	18 August 1911
An Act to authorise the Urban District Council of Woking to exercise some of the powers contained in the Act 18 Geo. III. c. lxxv. (Note: Basingstoke Canal Act 1778 (18 Geo. 3. c. 75)) as regards certain bridges vested in the company of proprietors of the Basingstoke Canal Navigation and for other purposes.
Manchester Corporation Act 1911	1 & 2 Geo. 5. c. cviii	18 August 1911
An Act to confer further powers upon the lord mayor aldermen and citizens of the city of Manchester with reference to the construction of street works tramways and main drainage works and otherwise for the better local government and improvement of the city and for other purposes.
Aberdare Urban District Council Act 1911 (repealed)	1 & 2 Geo. 5. c. cix	18 August 1911
An Act to enable the Urban District Council of Aber dare to construct tramways and run trolley cars by railless traction to make street improvements and to confer other powers upon the Council. (Repealed by Mid Glamorgan County Council Act 1987 (c. vii))
Brighton, Hove and District Railless Traction Act 1911 (repealed)	1 & 2 Geo. 5. c. cx	18 August 1911
An Act to empower the Brighton Hove and Preston United Omnibus Company Limited to work their omnibuses by means of railless traction and for other purposes. (Repealed by Brighton Corporation Act 1931 (21 & 22 Geo. 5. c. cix))
East Kent Electric Power Act 1911	1 & 2 Geo. 5. c. cxi	18 August 1911
An Act for transferring to the South East Kent Electric Power Company Limited certain of the powers of the Kent Electric Power Company and for other purposes.
Chiswick Urban District Council Act 1911 (repealed)	1 & 2 Geo. 5. c. cxii	18 August 1911
An Act to authorise the Urban District Council of Chiswick to construct street improvements and a river wall and other works to provide motor vehicles to provide for the regulation of the commons and for the extension of the district and to make further and better provision for the improvement and local government of the district and for other purposes. (Repealed by Hounslow Corporation Act 1968 (c. xxviii))
Halifax Corporation Act 1911 (repealed)	1 & 2 Geo. 5. c. cxiii	18 August 1911
An Act to confer powers on the mayor aldermen and burgesses of the county borough of Halifax for the construction of tramways street works and waterworks and to make further and better provision with regard to the water and other undertakings of the corporation and the health local government and improvement of the borough and for other purposes. (Repealed by West Yorkshire Act 1980 (c. xiv))
London County Council (Money) Act 1911 (repealed)	1 & 2 Geo. 5. c. cxiv	18 August 1911
An Act to regulate the expenditure of money by the London County Council on capital account during the current financial period and the raising of money to meet such expenditure and for other purposes. (Repealed by London County Council (Finance Consolidation) Act 1912 (2 & 3 Geo. 5. c. cv))
Margam Urban District Council Act 1911 (repealed)	1 & 2 Geo. 5. c. cxv	18 August 1911
An Act to empower the urban district council of Margam to supply gas and to provide for the transfer to the Council of so much of the gas undertaking of the Aberavon Corporation as is situate within the urban district of Margam and to make further and better provision with regard to the improvement health and local government of the district and for other purposes. (Repealed by Port Talbot Corporation Act 1972 (c. xlix))
Rotherham Corporation Act 1911	1 & 2 Geo. 5. c. cxvi	18 August 1911
An Act for conferring further powers upon the Corporation of Rotherham with reference to their tramway water gas and other undertakings to authorise the construction of street widenings and to make better provision for the health local government and finance of the borough of Rotherham and for other purposes.
St. Helens Corporation Act 1911	1 & 2 Geo. 5. c. cxvii	18 August 1911
An Act to confirm the constitution of the mayor aldermen and burgesses of the borough of St. Helens as the burial board of the borough of St. Helens and township of Windle to make further provision in regard to the granting of superannuation allowances to officers of the Corporation to make further provision in regard to their gas water and electricity undertakings and the health local government and improvement of the borough and for other purposes.
Metropolitan Water Board (New Works) Act 1911	1 & 2 Geo. 5. c. cxviii	18 August 1911
An Act to empower the Metropolitan Water Board to make waterworks and other works and to acquire lands and for other purposes.
Newcastle-upon-Tyne Corporation Act 1911	1 & 2 Geo. 5. c. cxix	18 August 1911
An Act to enable the lord mayor aldermen and citizens of the city and county of Newcastle-upon-Tyne to construct and work additional tramways in and adjacent to the city to make new streets and to acquire lands to alter the style and title of the Corporation to make further provisions with reference to the Corporation superannuation fund to make provisions as to the Town Moor and the quays of the Corporation to enable the Corporation to raise further money and to confer various further powers upon the Corporation in relation to the health and good government of the city and for other purposes.
Corporation of London (Bridges) Act 1911	1 & 2 Geo. 5. c. cxx	18 August 1911
An Act to empower the Corporation of London to construct a new bridge over the River Thames between Blackfriars and Southwark Bridges to rebuild Southwark Bridge and to confer other powers upon them with respect to those and other bridges and for other purposes.
Inverness Harbour Order Confirmation Act 1911	1 & 2 Geo. 5. c. cxxi	18 August 1911
An Act to confirm a Provisional Order under the Private Legislation Procedure (Scotland) Act 1899 relating to Inverness Harbour.
	Inverness Harbour Order 1911 Provisional Order to alter the constitution of the Trustees of the Harbour of Inverness and the method of electing Trustees to authorise the Trustees to construct works to confer further powers on the Trustees with respect to tolls rates and charges and the borrowing of money to confer powers on the Town Council of the Royal Burgh of Inverness with respect to levying a special harbour rate the granting of a guarantee and other matters and for other purposes.	
Dumbarton Churchyard Order Confirmation Act 1911	1 & 2 Geo. 5. c. cxxii	18 August 1911
An Act to confirm a Provisional Order under the Private Legislation Procedure (Scotland) Act 1899 relating to Dumbarton Churchyard.
	Dumbarton Churchyard Order 1911 Provisional Order to empower the Heritors of the Parish of Dumbarton to sell a portion of the Churchyard of the Parish and for other purposes.	
Chambers Institution of Peebles Order Confirmation Act 1911	1 & 2 Geo. 5. c. cxxiii	18 August 1911
An Act to confirm a Provisional Order under the Private Legislation Procedure (Scotland) Act 1899 relating to Chambers Institution Peebles.
	Chambers Institution of Peebles Order 1911 Provisional Order to transfer the administration and management of the Chambers Institution Peebles and endowments thereof to the Provost Magistrates and Councillors of the Royal burgh of Peebles and to the committee to be appointed on the adoption in the said burgh of the Public Libraries Consolidation (Scotland) Act 1887 (Note: Public Libraries Consolidation (Scotland) Act 1887 (50 & 51 Vict. c. 42)) as modified by this Order and to provide for the administration and management of the said Institution to continue the privileges of the said Institution to persons resident in the county of Peebles and for other purposes.	
Aberdeen Corporation Order Confirmation Act 1911 (repealed)	1 & 2 Geo. 5. c. cxxiv	18 August 1911
An Act to confirm a Provisional Order under the Private Legislation Procedure (Scotland) Act 1899 relating to Aberdeen Corporation. (Repealed by Aberdeen Corporation (Administration Finance, &c.) Order Confirmation Act 1940 (3 & 4 Geo. 6. c. iii))
	Aberdeen Corporation Order 1911 Provisional Order to confer further powers on the lord provost magistrates and town council of the city and Royal burgh of Aberdeen.	
North British Railway (Superannuation Fund, &c.) Order Confirmation Act 1911	1 & 2 Geo. 5. c. cxxv	18 August 1911
An Act to confirm a Provisional Order under the Private Legislation Procedure (Scotland) Act 1899 relating to the North British Railway (Superannuation Fund &c.)
	North British Railway (Superannuation Fund, &c.) Order 1911 Provisional Order to provide for a Superannuation Scheme for the salaried officers of the North British Railway Company in substitution for the North. British Railway Superannuation Fund established under the provisions of the North British Railway Act 1875. (Note: North British Railway Act 1875 (38 & 39 Vict. c. c))	
Dunfermline and District Tramways Order Confirmation Act 1911	1 & 2 Geo. 5. c. cxxvi	18 August 1911
An Act to confirm a Provisional Order under the Private Legislation Procedure (Scotland) Act 1899 relating to Dunfermline and District Tramways.
	Dunfermline and District Tramways Order 1911 Provisional Order to extend the time for the construction of certain Tramways authorised by the Dunfermline and District Tramways Order 1906 to revive the powers and extend the time for the acquisition of Lands in connexion therewith and for other purposes.	
Edinburgh Suburban Electric Tramways Order Confirmation Act 1911	1 & 2 Geo. 5. c. cxxvii	18 August 1911
An Act to confirm a Provisional Order under the Private Legislation Procedure (Scotland) Act 1899 relating to Edinburgh Suburban Electric Tramways.
	Edinburgh Suburban Electric Tramways Order 1911 Provisional Order to extend the time for the construction of the tramways and street works authorised by the Edinburgh Suburban Electric Tramways Order 1906 to revive the powers and extend the time for the acquisition of lands in connexion therewith and for other purposes.	
Paisley District Tramways Order Confirmation Act 1911 (repealed)	1 & 2 Geo. 5. c. cxxviii	18 August 1911
An Act to confirm a Provisional Order under the Private Legislation Procedure (Scotland) Act 1899 relating to Paisley District Tramways. (Repealed by Glasgow Corporation Consolidation (Water, Transport and Markets) Order Confirmation Act 1964 (c. xliii))
	Paisley District Tramways Order 1911 Provisional Order to regulate the issue of the share capital of the Paisley District Tramways Company and for other purposes.	
Partick Burgh Order Confirmation Act 1911 (repealed)	1 & 2 Geo. 5. c. cxxix	18 August 1911
An Act to confirm a Provisional Order under the Private Legislation Procedure (Scotland) Act 1899 relating to Partick Burgh. (Repealed by Statute Law (Repeals) Act 1998 (c. 43))
	Partick Burgh Order 1911 Provisional Order to provide for the application of certain sums of money belonging to the burgh of Partick to enable the Town Council of that burgh to raise money by bills to constitute a dean of guild court for the burgh to enlarge the powers of the Town Council in relation to their electricity undertaking to amend the Burgh Police (Scotland) Acts and other Acts in their application to the burgh to confer further powers on the Town Council and for other purposes.	
Wellpark (Glasgow) Church and Parish Quoad Sacra Order Confirmation Act 1911	1 & 2 Geo. 5. c. cxxx	18 August 1911
An Act to confirm a Provisional Order under the Private Legislation Procedure (Scotland) Act 1899 relating to Wellpark (Glasgow) Church and Parish Quoad Sacra.
	Wellpark (Glasgow) Church and Parish Quoad Sacra Order 1911 Order to authorise the annexation of Wellpark Parish Quoad Sacra Glasgow to one or more of the adjoining parishes the sale of the Church of that Parish the application of the endowments and the price of the Church to the endowment of a new parish and the provision of a Church for such new parish and other matters relating to these objects.	
Local Government Board (Ireland) Provisional Orders Confirmation (No. 1) Act 1911	1 & 2 Geo. 5. c. cxxxi	18 August 1911
An Act to confirm certain Provisional Orders of the Local Government Board for Ireland relating to the County Borough of Waterford and the Counties of Kilkenny Tipperary (North Riding) and Waterford.
	County Borough of Waterford Order 1911 Provisional Order made in pursuance of Article 22 of the Local Government (Application of Enactments) Order 1898. (Note: Local Government (Application of Enactments) Order 1898 (SR&O 1899/1120))	
	County of Kilkenny Order 1911 Provisional Order made in pursuance of Article 22 of the Local Government (Application of Enactments) Order 1898.	
	County of Tipperary (North Riding) Order 1911 Provisional Order made in pursuance of Article 22 of the Local Government (Application of Enactments) Order 1898.	
	County of Waterford Order 1911 Provisional Order made in pursuance of Article 22 of the Local Government (Application of Enactments) Order 1898.	
Local Government Board (Ireland) Provisional Orders Confirmation (No. 2) Act 1911	1 & 2 Geo. 5. c. cxxxii	18 August 1911
An Act to confirm certain Provisional Orders of the Local Government Board for Ireland relating to King's County and the County of Kildare and the Rural Districts of Ballyshannon Loughrea and Tralee.
	Derryholmes Drainage Order 1911 Provisional Order to transfer the business of the Trustees for the Derryholmes Drainage District to the County Council of the King's County.	
	Rathangan River Drainage Order 1911 Provisional Order to transfer the business of the Drainage Board for the Rathangan River Drainage District to the County Council of Kildare.	
	Bundoran Sewerage Order 1911 Provisional Order to enable the Council of the Rural District of Ballyshannon to put in force the Compulsory Clauses of the Lands Clauses Acts.	
	Athenry Waterworks Order 1911 Provisional Order to enable the Council of the Rural District of Loughrea to put in force the Compulsory Clauses of the Lands Clauses Acts.	
	Glebe (Churchill) Burial Ground Order 1911 Provisional Order to enable the Council of the Rural District of Tralee to put in force the Compulsory Clauses of the Lands Clauses Acts.	
Local Government Board (Ireland) Provisional Orders Confirmation (No. 3) Act 1911	1 & 2 Geo. 5. c. cxxxiii	18 August 1911
An Act to confirm certain Provisional Orders of the Local Government Board for Ireland relating to the Urban Districts of Blackrock and Donaghadee.
	Blackrock Order 1911 Provisional Order to enable the Council of the Urban District of Blackrock to put in force the Compulsory Clauses of the Lands Clauses Acts.	
	Donaghadee (Waterworks and Sewerage) Order 1911 Provisional Order to enable the Council of the Urban District of Donaghadee to put in force the Compulsory Clauses of the Lands Clauses Acts.	
Land Drainage Provisional Order Confirmation Act 1911 (repealed)	1 & 2 Geo. 5. c. cxxxiv	18 August 1911
An Act to confirm a Provisional Order under the Land Drainage Act 1861 (Note: Land Drainage Act 1861 (24 & 25 Vict. c. 133)) in the matter of a proposed drainage district in the Parishes of Minsterworth and Highnam Over and Linton in the County of Gloucester. (Repealed by Statute Law (Repeals) Act 1993 (c. 50))
	In the matter of a proposed Drainage District in the Parishes of Minsterworth and Highnam Over and Linton in the County of Gloucester.	
Land Drainage Provisional Order Confirmation (No. 2) Act 1911 (repealed)	1 & 2 Geo. 5. c. cxxxv	18 August 1911
An Act to confirm a Provisional Order under the Land Drainage Act 1861 in the matter of a proposed drainage district in the Parishes of West Butterwick Owston and Belton in the County of Lincoln. (Repealed by Statute Law (Repeals) Act 1993 (c. 50))
	In the matter of a proposed Drainage. District in the Parishes of West Butterwick Owston and Belton in the County of Lincoln.	
Land Drainage Provisional Order Confirmation (No. 3) Act 1911 (repealed)	1 & 2 Geo. 5. c. cxxxvi	18 August 1911
An Act to confirm a Provisional Order under the Land Drainage Act 1861 in the matter of a proposed drainage district in the Parishes of Billingborough and Birthorpe (detached) in the County of Lincoln. (Repealed by Statute Law (Repeals) Act 1993 (c. 50))
	In the matter of a proposed Drainage District in the Parishes of Billingborough and Birthorpe (detached) in the County of Lincoln.	
Metropolitan Police Provisional Order Confirmation Act 1911 (repealed)	1 & 2 Geo. 5. c. cxxxvii	18 August 1911
An Act to confirm a Provisional Order made by one of His Majesty's Principal Secretaries of State under the Metropolitan Police Act 1886. (Note: Metropolitan Police Act 1886 (49 & 50 Vict. c. 22)) (Repealed by Statute Law (Repeals) Act 2008 (c. 12))
	Order made by the Secretary of State under the Metropolitan Police Act 1886.	
Derwent Fisheries Provisional Order Confirmation Act 1911	1 & 2 Geo. 5. c. cxxxviii	18 August 1911
An Act to confirm a Provisional Order under the Salmon and Freshwater Fisheries Act 1907 (Note: Salmon and Freshwater Fisheries Act 1907 (7 Edw. 7. c. 15)) relating to the River Derwent and other waters.
	Derwent Fisheries Provisional Order 1911 Derwent Fisheries Provisional Order 1911.	
Severn Fisheries Provisional Order (1910) Confirmation Act 1911	1 & 2 Geo. 5. c. cxxxix	18 August 1911
An Act to confirm an Order under the Salmon and Freshwater Fisheries Act 1907 relating to the River Severn and other waters.
	Severn Fisheries Provisional Order 1911 Severn Fisheries Provisional Order 1911.	
Local Government Board's Provisional Orders Confirmation (No. 1) Act 1911	1 & 2 Geo. 5. c. cxl	18 August 1911
An Act to confirm certain Provisional Orders of the Local Government Board relating to Fulwood Scarborough Sowerby Bridge and Stockton-on-Tees.
	Fulwood Order 1911 Provisional Order for altering the Fulwood and Whittingham Water Act 1882 (Note: Fulwood and Whittingham Water Act 1882 (45 & 46 Vict. c. xi)) the Fulwood Local Board Act 1885 (Note: Fulwood Local Board Act 1885 (48 & 49 Vict. c. xxxv)) and the Fulwood Local Board (Water) Act 1894. (Note: Fulwood Local Board (Water) Act 1894 (57 & 58 Vict. c. lviii))	
	Scarborough Order 1911 Provisional Order for partially repealing and altering the Scarborough Valley Bridge Company's Act 1864. (Note: Scarborough Valley Bridge Company's Act 1864 (27 & 28 Vict. c. lxviii))	
	Sowerby Bridge Order 1911 Provisional Order for altering the Sowerby Bridge Gas Act 1861 (Note: Sowerby Bridge Gas Act 1861 (24 & 25 Vict. c. lxxx)) the Sowerby Bridge Local Board Act 1863 (Note: Sowerby Bridge Local Board Act 1863 (26 & 27 Vict. c. lii)) the Local Government Board's Provisional Orders Confirmation (No. 8) Act 1884 (Note: Local Government Board's Provisional Orders Confirmation (No. 8) Act 1884 (47 & 48 Vict. c. ccxv)) and the Local Government Board's Provisional Orders Confirmation (No. 6) Act 1894. (Note: Local Government Board's Provisional Orders Confirmation (No. 6) Act 1894 (57 & 58 Vict. c. xxiii))	
	Stockton-on-Tees Order 1911 Provisional Order for altering the Stockton Gas Act 1857 (Note: Stockton Gas Act 1857 (20 & 21 Vict. c. lii)) the Stockton Gas Act 1866 (Note: Stockton Gas Act 1866 (29 & 30 Vict. c. cvi)) the Stockton Gas Act 1873 (Note: Stockton Gas Act 1873 (36 & 37 Vict. c. lxvii)) and the Stockton-on-Tees Corporation (Gas) Act 1893. (Note: Stockton-on-Tees Corporation (Gas) Act 1893 (56 & 57 Vict. c. xvi))	
Local Government Board's Provisional Orders Confirmation (No. 2) Act 1911	1 & 2 Geo. 5. c. cxli	18 August 1911
An Act to confirm certain Provisional Orders of the Local Government Board relating to Brighton Epsom (Rural) Exeter Liverpool Pontypridd and the East Dean and United Districts Joint Hospital District.
	Brighton Order 1911 Provisional Order for altering the Brighton Corporation Act, 1901. (Note: Brighton Corporation Act 1901 (1 Edw. 7. c. ccxxiv))	
	Epsom Rural Order 1911 Provisional Order to enable the Rural District Council of Epsom to put in force the Compulsory Clauses of the Lands Clauses Acts.	
	Exeter Order 1911 Provisional Order to enable the Urban Sanitary Authority for the City and County of the City of Exeter to put in force the Compulsory Clauses of the Lands Clauses Acts.	
	Liverpool Order 1911 Provisionat Order for altering the Liverpool Improvement Act 1867 (Note: Liverpool Improvement Act 1867 (30 & 31 Vict. c. clxviii)) the Liverpool Corporation Act 1902 (Note: Liverpool Corporation Act 1902 (2 Edw. 7. c. ccxl)) the Liverpool Corporation (General Powers) Act 1905 (Note: Liverpool Corporation (General Powers) Act 1905 (5 Edw. 7. c. clxxvii)) and the Liverpool Corporation (Streets and Buildings) Act 1908. (Note: Liverpool Corporation (Streets and Buildings) Act 1908 (8 Edw. 7. c. clxv))	
	Pontypridd Order 1911 Provisional Order for altering the Pontypridd Urban District Council Act 1903 (Note: Pontypridd Urban District Council Act 1903 (3 Edw. 7. c. cxv)) and the Pontypridd Urban District Council Act 1907. (Note: Pontypridd Urban District Council Act 1907 (7 Edw. 7. c. lxxiii))	
	East Dean and United Districts Joint Hospital Order 1911 Provisional Order for forming a United District under Section 279 of the Public Health Act 1875. (Note: Public Health Act 1875 (38 & 39 Vict. c. 55))	
Local Government Board's Provisional Orders Confirmation (No. 3) Act 1911	1 & 2 Geo. 5. c. cxlii	18 August 1911
An Act to confirm certain Provisional Orders of the Local Government Board relating to Farnworth Padiham Plymouth Skipton and Weston-super-Mare.
	Farnworth Order 1911 Provisional Order for altering the Farnworth Urban District Council Act 1900. (Note: Farnworth Urban District Council Act 1900 (63 & 64 Vict. c. ccxxxiii))	
	Padiham Order 1911 Provisional Order for altering the Padiham Local Board Act 1876 (Note: Padiham Local Board Act 1876 (39 & 40 Vict. c. xxv)) and the Padiham Urban District Council Act 1908. (Note: Padiham Urban District Council Act 1908 (8 Edw. 7. c. civ))	
	Plymouth Order 1911 Provisional Order for partially repealing and altering the Plymouth Corporation Act 1887. (Note: Plymouth Corporation Act 1887 (50 & 51 Vict. c. clv))	
	Skipton Order 1911 Provisional Order for altering the Skipton Water and Improvement Act 1904. (Note: Skipton Water and Improvement Act 1904 (4 Edw. 7. c. civ))	
	Weston-super-Mare Order 1911 Provisional Order for altering the Weston-super-Mare Improvement Commissioners Water Act 1878 (Note: Weston-super-Mare Improvement Commissioners Water Act 1878 (41 & 42 Vict. c. clxxxv)) and the Weston-super-Mare Improvement Act 1887. (Note: Weston-super-Mare Improvement Act 1887 (50 & 51 Vict. c. cvii))	
Local Government Board's Provisional Orders Confirmation (No. 4) Act 1911	1 & 2 Geo. 5. c. cxliii	18 August 1911
An Act to confirm certain Provisional Orders of the Local Government Board relating to Acton Torquay Tottenham Wolverhampton and the Whaley Bridge Joint Sewerage District.
	Acton Order 1911 Provisional Order for altering the Acton Sewage Act 1905. (Note: Acton Sewage Act 1905 (5 Edw. 7. c. cciii))	
	Torquay Order 1911 Provisional Order for altering the Torquay Corporation Water Act 1903. (Note: Torquay Corporation Water Act 1903 (3 Edw. 7. c. cvi))	
	Tottenham Order 1911 Provisional Order for altering the Tottenham Local Board Act 1890. (Note: Tottenham Local Board Act 1890 (53 & 54 Vict. c. ccxliv))	
	Wolverhampton Order 1911 Provisional Order for altering the Wolverhampton Improvement Act 1869. (Note: Wolverhampton Improvement Act 1869 (32 & 33 Vict. c. cxxxi))	
	Whaley Bridge Joint Sewerage Order 1911 Provisional Order for altering a Confirming Act. (Note: Local Government Board's Provisional Orders Confirmation (No. 9) Act 1909 (9 Edw. 7. c. clvi))	
Local Government Board's Provisional Orders Confirmation (No. 5) Act 1911	1 & 2 Geo. 5. c. cxliv	18 August 1911
An Act to confirm certain Provisional Orders of the Local Government Board relating to Burnley and Bury.
	Burnley (Extension) Order 1911 Provisional Order made in pursuance of Sections 54 and 59 of the Local Government Act 1888.	
	Bury (Extension) Order 1911 Provisional Order made in pursuance of Sections 54 and 59 of the Local Government Act 1888.	
Local Government Board's Provisional Orders Confirmation (No. 6) Act 1911	1 & 2 Geo. 5. c. cxlv	18 August 1911
An Act to confirm certain Provisional Orders of the Local Government Board relating to East Westmorland Rural Ilfracombe Leigh on Sea and Windermere.
	East Westmorland Rural Order 1911 Provisional Order to enable the Rural District Council of East Westmorland to put in force the Compulsory Clauses of the Lands Clauses Acts.	
	Ilfracombe Order 1911 Provisional Order to enable the Urban District Council of Ilfracombe to put in force the Compulsory Clauses of the Lands Clauses Acts.	
	Leigh-on-Sea Order 1911 Provisional Order to enable the Urban District Council of Leigh-on-Sea to put in force the Compulsory Clauses of the Lands Clauses Acts.	
	Windermere Order 1911 Provisional Order to enable the Urban District Council of Windermere to put in force the Compulsory Clauses of the Lands Clauses Acts.	
Local Government Board's Provisional Orders Confirmation (No. 8) Act 1911	1 & 2 Geo. 5. c. cxlvi	18 August 1911
An Act to confirm certain Provisional Orders of the Local Government Board relating to Burton-upon-Trent Colwyn Bay and Colwyn Kingston-upon-Thames Leigh and Northallerton.
	Burton-upon-Trent Order 1911 Provisional Order for altering the Town of Burton-upon-Trent Act 1853 (Note: Town of Burton-upon-Trent Act 1853 (16 & 17 Vict. c. cxviii)) the Burton-upon-Trent Improvement Act 1878 (Note: Burton-upon-Trent Improvement Act 1878 (41 & 42 Vict. c. lxi)) and the Burton-upon-Trent Corporation Act 1896. (Note: Burton-upon-Trent Corporation Act 1896 (59 & 60 Vict. c. cxlviii))	
	Colwyn Bay and Colwyn Order 1911 Provisional Order for altering the Colwyn Bay and Colwyn Urban District Council Act 1902. (Note: Colwyn Bay and Colwyn Urban District Council Act 1902 (2 Edw. 7. c. clxxv))	
	Kingston-upon-Thames Order 1911 Provisional Order for altering the mode of defraying the expenses of an Urban District Council and for partially repealing and altering the Kingston-upon-Thames Improvement Act 1855. (Note: Kingston-upon-Thames Improvement Act 1855 (18 & 19 Vict. c. xlv))	
	Leigh Order 1911 Provisional Order for partially repealing and altering a Local Act (Note: Westleigh, Pennington and Bedford Local Boards (Gas) Act 1874 (37 & 38 Vict. c. lxxi)) and certain Confirming Acts.	
	Northallerton Order 1911 Provisional Order for altering the Northallerton Waterworks Acts 1891 (Note: Northallerton Waterworks Act 1891 (54 & 55 Vict. c. cxxxiv)) and 1909. (Note: Northallerton Waterworks Act 1909 (9 Edw. 7. c. lxxxiii))	
Local Government Board's Provisional Orders Confirmation (No. 9) Act 1911	1 & 2 Geo. 5. c. cxlvii	18 August 1911
An Act to confirm certain Provisional Orders of the Local Government Board relating to the district of the Accrington District Gas and Water Board the Middlesex Districts Joint Small-pox Hospital District the South Staffordshire Joint Small-pox Hospital District and the Swansea Rural District.
	Accrington District Gas and Water Board Order 1911 Provisional Order for altering the Accrington District Gas and Water Board Act 1894 (Note: Accrington District Gas and Water Board Act 1894 (57 & 58 Vict. c. cxxxiv)) the Accrington District Gas and Water Board Act 1905 (Note: Accrington District Gas and Water Board Act 1905 (5 Edw. 7. c. xl)) and the Accrington District Gas and Water Board Act 1906. (Note: Accrington District Gas and Water Board Act 1906 (6 Edw. 7. c. xvii))	
	Middlesex Districts Joint Small-Pox Hospital Order 1911 Provisional Order for altering certain Confirming Acts.	
	Swansea Rural Order 1911 Provisional Order for altering certain Confirming Acts.	
Local Government Board's Provisional Order Confirmation (No. 11) Act 1911 (repealed)	1 & 2 Geo. 5. c. cxlviii	18 August 1911
An Act to confirm a Provisional Order of the Local Government Board relating to Reading. (Repealed by Berkshire Act 1986 (c. ii))
	Reading (Extension) Order 1911 Provisional Order made in pursuance of Sections 54 and 59 of the Local Government Act 1888.	
Local Government Board's Provisional Orders Confirmation (No. 14) Act 1911	1 & 2 Geo. 5. c. cxlix	18 August 1911
An Act to confirm certain Provisional Orders of the Local Government Board relating to Hereford Lancaster and Sudbury and the Birmingham Tame and Rea Main Sewerage and the Peterborough Joint Cemetery Districts.
	Hereford Order 1911 Provisional Order for altering the Hereford Improvement Act 1854 (Note: Hereford Improvement Act 1854 (17 & 18 Vict. c. xxxi)) and the Hereford Improvement Act 1872. (Note: Hereford Improvement Act 1872 (35 & 36 Vict. c. cxix))	
	Lancaster Order 1911 Provisional Order for partially repealing and altering the Local Act 5 George IV. Cap. LXVI. (Note: Lancaster Improvement Act 1824 (5 Geo. 4. c. lxvi)) the Lancaster Water and Improvement Act 1876 (Note: Lancaster Water and Improvement Act 1876 (39 & 40 Vict. c. clxxxvi)) the Lancaster Corporation Act 1880 (Note: Lancaster Corporation Act 1880 (43 & 44 Vict. c. lxxvii)) the Lancaster Corporation Act 1888 (Note: Lancaster Corporation Act 1888 (51 & 52 Vict. c. clv)) and the Lancaster Corporation Act 1900. (Note: Lancaster Corporation Act 1900 (63 & 64 Vict. c. ccxxxvi))	
	Sudbury (Suffolk) Order 1911 Provisional Order for partially repealing and altering the Local Act 6 George IV. Cap. LXX (Note: Sudbury (Suffolk) Improvement Act 1825 (6 Geo. 4. c. lxx)) and the Local Act 5 & 6 Victoria Cap. LXXXVII. (Note: Sudbury (Suffolk) Improvement Act 1842 (5 & 6 Vict. c. lxxxvii))	
	Birmingham, Tame and Rea Main Sewerage Order 1911 Provisional Order for altering certain Confirming Acts.	
	Peterborough Joint Cemetery Order 1911 Provisional Order for repealing the Peterborough Improvement and Cemetery Act 1850 (Note: Peterborough Improvement and Cemetery Act 1850 (13 & 14 Vict. c. xciii)) and for forming a United District under Section 279 of the Public Health Act 1875.	
Local Government Board's Provisional Order Confirmation (No. 15) Act 1911	1 & 2 Geo. 5. c. cl	18 August 1911
An Act to confirm a Provisional Order of the Local Government Board relating to Milford Haven.
	Milford Haven Order 1911 Provisional Order for altering the Milford Improvement Act 1857 (Note: Milford Improvement Act 1857 (20 & 21 Vict. c. lxxiv)) the Milford Improvement Act 1869 (Note: Milford Improvement Act 1869 (32 & 33 Vict. c. xcvii)) and certain Confirming Acts.	
Local Government Board's Provisional Orders Confirmation (Gas) Act 1911	1 & 2 Geo. 5. c. cli	18 August 1911
An Act to confirm certain Provisional Orders of the Local Government Board relating to Cudworth and Liverpool.
	Cudworth Gas Order 1911 Provisional Order under the Gas and Water Works Facilities Act 1870 (Note: Gas and Water Works Facilities Act 1870 (33 & 34 Vict. c. 70)) and the Gas and Water Works Facilities Act 1870 Amendment Act 1873. (Note: Gas and Water Works Facilities Act 1870 Amendment Act 1873 (36 & 37 Vict. c. 89))	
	Liverpool Corporation (Fazakerley) Gas Order 1911 Provisional Order under the Gas and Water Works Facilities Act 1870 and the Gas and Water Works Facilities Act 1870 Amendment Act 1873.	
Local Government Board's Provisional Order Confirmation (Gas) (No. 2) Act 1911 (repealed)	1 & 2 Geo. 5. c. clii	18 August 1911
An Act to confirm a Provisional Order of the Local Government Board relating to Droitwich. (Repealed by Statute Law (Repeals) Act 1998 (c. 43))
	Droitwich Gas Order 1911 Provisional Order under the Gas and Water Works Facilities Act 1870 and the Gas and Water Works Facilities Act 1870 Amendment Act 1873.	
Board of Education Scheme (Alnwick Corporation Payment) Confirmation Act 1911	1 & 2 Geo. 5. c. cliii	18 August 1911
An Act to confirm a Scheme approved and certified by the Board of Education under the Charitable Trusts Act 1853 (Note: Charitable Trusts Act 1853 (16 & 17 Vict. c. 137)) relating to the yearly payment out of the Corporation Funds to the Corporation Schools in the Borough of Alnwick under section seven of the Alnwick Corporation Act 1882. (Note: Alnwick Corporation Act 1882 (45 & 46 Vict. c. xxiii))
	Board of Education (Alnwick Corporation) Scheme 1911 Alteration of Alnwick Corporation Act 1882.	
Education Board Provisional Orders Confirmation (Durham, &c.) Act 1911	1 & 2 Geo. 5. c. cliv	18 August 1911
An Act to confirm certain Provisional Orders made by the Board of Education under the Education Acts 1870 to 1907 to enable the Councils of the Administrative Counties of Durham Montgomery and Worcester and the Urban District of Willesden to put in force the Lands Clauses Acts.
	Board of Education (Durham County Council) Order 1911 Provisional Order for putting in force the Lands Clauses Acts.	
	Board of Education (Montgomeryshire County Council) Order 1911 Provisional Order for putting in force the Lands Clauses Acts.	
	Board of Education (Worcestershire County Council) Order 1911 Provisional Order for putting in force the Lands Clauses Acts.	
	Board of Education (Willesden Urban District Council) Order 1911 Provisional Order for putting in force the Lands Clauses Acts.	
Education Board Provisional Orders Confirmation (London) Act 1911	1 & 2 Geo. 5. c. clv	18 August 1911
An Act to confirm certain Provisional Orders made by the Board of Education under the Education Acts 1870 to 1907 to enable the London County Council to put in force the Lands Clauses Acts.
	Board of Education (London County Council) Order (No. 1) 1911 Provisional Order (No. 1) for putting in force the Lands Clauses Acts.	
	Board of Education (London County Council) Order (No. 2) 1911 Provisional Order (No. 2) for putting in force the Lands Clauses Acts.	
Drainage and Improvement of Lands (Ireland) Supplemental Act 1911	1 & 2 Geo. 5. c. clvi	18 August 1911
An Act to confirm two Provisional Orders under the Drainage and Improvement of Lands (Ireland) Acts 1863 to 1892 relating to the Curraghtown Drainage District in the county of Meath and the Akeragh Lough Drainage District in the county of Kerry.
	Curraghtown (County Meath) Drainage District Order 1911 In the matter of the Curraghtown Drainage District in the county of Meath.	
	Akeragh Lough (County Kerry) Drainage District Order 1911 In the matter of the Akeragh Lough Drainage District in the county of Kerry.	
Pier and Harbour Orders Confirmation (No. 1) Act 1911	1 & 2 Geo. 5. c. clvii	18 August 1911
An Act to confirm certain Provisional Orders made by the Board of Trade under the General Pier and Harbour Act 1861 (Note: General Pier and Harbour Act 1861 (24 & 25 Vict. c. 45)) relating to Banff Gardenstown and Port Gordon.
	Banff Harbour Order 1911 Order for amending an Act passed in the Third and Fourth Years of the Reign of Her Majesty Queen Victoria (Note: Banff Government and Harbour Act 1840 (3 & 4 Vict. c. cxiv)) relating to Banff Harbour and the Banff Harbour Order 1895 and for conferring further powers upon the Banff Harbour Trustees.	
	Gardenstown Harbour Order 1911 Order for the Incorporation of a body of Trustees and the construction maintenance and regulation of Piers and Works at the Harbour of Gardenstown in the Parish of Gamrie in the County of Banff.	
	Port Gordon Harbour Order 1911 Provisional Order for amending the rates authorised to be taken at the Harbour or Port of Port Gordon in the County of Banff and for other purposes connected therewith.	
Pier and Harbour Orders Confirmation (No. 2) Act 1911	1 & 2 Geo. 5. c. clviii	18 August 1911
An Act to confirm certain Provisional Orders made by the Board of Trade under the General Pier and Harbour Act 1861 relating to Brighton Portsmouth and Southend-on-Sea.
	Brighton Marine Palace and Pier Order 1911 Order authorising a widening of the Brighton Marine Palace and Pier in the County Borough of Brighton in the County of Sussex and for other purposes.	
	Portsmouth Camber Dock and Flathouse Wharf Order 1911 Provisional Order empowering the Corporation of Portsmouth to construct subsidiary works in connexion with the Camber Dock and Flathouse Wharf and to levy rates and dues and for other purposes.	
	Southend-on-Sea Loading Pier Order 1911 Provisional Order for authorising the construction of a loading pier or jetty at Southend-on-Sea in the County of Essex and the abandonment of the existing loading pier and for other purposes.	
Pier and Harbour Order Confirmation (No. 3) Act 1911 (repealed)	1 & 2 Geo. 5. c. clix	18 August 1911
An Act to confirm a Provisional Order made by the Board of Trade under the General Pier and Harbour Act 1861 relating to Cullen. (Repealed by Statute Law (Repeals) Act 1998 (c. 43))
	Cullen Harbour Order 1911 Order for the transfer from the Cullen Harbour Commissioners incorporated under the Cullen Harbour Orders 1884 and 1886 as confirmed by the Pier and Harbour Orders Confirmation Acts 1884 (Note: Pier and Harbour Orders Confirmation Act 1884 (47 & 48 Vict. c. ccxvi)) and 1886 (Note: Pier and Harbour Orders Confirmation Act 1886 (50 Vict. c. ix)) and the Acts incorporated therewith of the undertaking known as the Cullen Harbour and certain lands and other subjects in the vicinity thereof to the Provost Magistrates and Councillors of the Royal Burgh of Cullen in the County of Banff to confer powers on the Town Council with reference to the holding maintenance management and improvement of the said Harbour and to authorise the Town Council to borrow money for the purposes of the said Harbour and otherwise and for other purposes.	
Electric Lighting Orders Confirmation (No. 1) Act 1911	1 & 2 Geo. 5. c. clx	18 August 1911
An Act to confirm certain Provisional Orders made by the Board of Trade under the Electric Lighting Acts 1882 (Note: Electric Lighting Act 1882 (45 & 46 Vict. c. 56)) and 1888 (Note: Electric Lighting Act 1888 (51 & 52 Vict. c. 12)) relating to Accrington (Extension) Aldeburgh Ashford Blandford Forum Budleigh Salterton Carlisle (Extension) Chichester (Extension) Cirencester Leominster and Newcastle upon Tyne (Extension).
	Accrington Corporation Electric Lighting (Extension) Order 1911 Provisional Order granted by the Board of Trade under the Electric Lighting Acts 1882 and 1888 to the Mayor Aldermen and Burgesses of the Borough of Accrington in respect of the Urban District of Clayton-le-Moors and the Parish of Altham in the Rural District of Burnley both in the County of Lancaster.	
	Aldeburgh Electric Lighting Order 1911 Provisional Order granted by the Board of Trade under the Electric Lighting Acts 1882 and 1888 to Messrs. Christy Brothers and Company Limited in respect of the Borough of Aldeburgh in the County of Suffolk.	
	Ashford Electric Lighting Order 1911 Provisional Order granted by the Board of Trade under the Electric Lighting Acts 1882 and 1888 to the East Kent Electric Supply Company Limited in respect of the Urban District of Ashford and portions of the Rural District of East Ashford all in the County of Kent.	
	Blandford Forum Electric Lighting Order 1911 Provisional Order granted by the Board of Trade under the Electric Lighting Acts 1882 and 1888 to Messrs. J. and W. Purves in respect of the Borough of Blandford Forum in the County of Dorset.	
	Budleigh Salterton Electric Lighting Order 1911 Provisional Order granted by the Board of Trade under the Electric Lighting Acts 1882 and 1888 to John Archibald Purves and William Thompson Purves in respect of the Urban District of Budleigh Salterton in the County of Devon.	
	Carlisle Corporation Electric Lighting (Extension) Order 1911 Provisional Order granted by the Board of Trade under the Electric Lighting Acts 1882 and 1888 to the Mayor Aldermen and Citizens of the City of Carlisle in respect of part of the Rural District of Carlisle in the County of Cumberland.	
	Chichester Electric Lighting (Extension) Order 1911 Provisional Order granted by the Board of Trade under the Electric Lighting Acts 1882 and 1888 to the Chichester Electric Light and Power Company Limited in respect of portions of the Rural Districts of Westhampnett and Westbourne in the County of Sussex.	
	Cirencester Electric Lighting Order 1911 Provisional Order granted by the Board of Trade under the Electric Lighting Acts 1882 and 1888 to James Herbert Edwards in respect of the Urban District of Cirencester in the County of Gloucester.	
	Leominster Electric Lighting Order 1911 Provisional Order granted by the Board of Trade under the Electric Lighting Acts 1882 and 1888 to James Herbert Edwards in respect of the Borough of Leominster in the County of Hereford.	
	Newcastle-upon-Tyne (Kenton Extension) Electric Lighting Order 1911 Provisional Order granted by the Board of Trade under the Electric Lighting Acts 1882 and 1888 to the Newcastle-uроп-Тyne Electric Supply Company Limited in respect of an Extension of their existing Area of Supply to include that portion of Kenton which is now included in the City and County of Newcastle-upon-Tупe.	
Electric Lighting Orders Confirmation (No. 2) Act 1911	1 & 2 Geo. 5. c. clxi	18 August 1911
An Act to confirm certain Provisional Orders made by the Board of Trade under the Electric Lighting Acts 1882 and 1888 relating to Macclesfield Pateley Bridge Portishead and District Rhondda Salisbury (Extension) Wimbledon (Extension) and Witney.
	Macclesfield Electric Lighting Order 1911 Provisional Order granted by the Board of Trade under the Electric Lighting Acts 1882 and 1888 to the New Electricity Company of Macclesfield Limited in respect of the Municipal Borough of Macclesfield in the County of Chester.	
	Pateley Bridge Electric Lighting Order 1911 Provisional Order granted by the Board of Trade under the Electric Lighting Acts 1882 and 1888 to Messieurs Christy Brothers and Company Limited in respect of parts of the Parishes of Bewerley and High and Low Bishopside in the Rural District of Pateley Bridge in the West Riding of the County of York.	
	Portishead and District Electric Lighting Order 1911 Provisional Order granted by the Board of Trade under the Electric Lighting Acts 1882 and 1888 to Messieurs Christy Brothers and Company Limited in respect of the Urban District of Portishead and the Parishes of Portbury Easton-in-Gordano North Weston Abbotsleigh Clapton Wraxall Flax Bourton Long Ashton Nailsea Tickenham Weston-in-Gordano and part of the Parish of Walton-in-Gordano in the Rural District of Long Ashton all in the County of Somerset.	
	Rhondda Electric Lighting Order 1911 Provisional Order granted by the Board of Trade under the Electric Lighting Acts 1882 and 1888 to the Rhondda Urban District Council in respect of the Rhondda Urban District in the County of Glamorgan.	
	Salisbury (Extension) Electric Lighting Order 1911 Provisional Order granted by the Board of Trade under the Electric Lighting Acts 1882 and 1888 to the Salisbury Electric Light and Supply Company Limited in respect of part of the City of Salisbury part of the Parish of Bemerton in the Rural District of Wilton and part of the Parish of West Harnham in the Rural District of Salisbury and for the amendment of the Salisbury Electric Lighting Order 1895.	
	Wimbledon Electric Lighting (Extension) Order 1911 Provisional Order granted by the Board of Trade under the Electric Lighting Acts 1882 and 1888 to the Mayor Aldermen and Burgesses of the Borough of Wimbledon in respect of the Urban District of the Maldens and Coombe in the County of Surrey.	
	Witney Urban District Council Electric Lighting Order 1911 Provisional Order granted by the Board of Trade under the Electric Lighting Acts 1882 and 1888 to the Urban District Council of Witney in respect of the Urban District of Witney.	
Electric Lighting Orders Confirmation (No. 3) Act 1911	1 & 2 Geo. 5. c. clxii	18 August 1911
An Act to confirm certain Provisional Orders made by the Board of Trade under the Electric Lighting Acts 1882 and 1888 the Electric Lighting (Scotland) Act 1890 (Note: Electric Lighting (Scotland) Act 1890 (53 & 54 Vict. c. 13)) and the Electric Lighting (Scotland) Act 1902 (Note: Electric Lighting (Scotland) Act 1902 (2 Edw. 7. c. 35)) relating to Alloa (Extension) the County of Fife certain Burghs and Parishes and Grangemouth (Amendment).
	Alloa Electric Lighting (Extension) Order 1911 Provisional Order granted by the Board of Trade under the Electric Lighting Acts 1882 and 1888 the Electric Lighting (Scotland) Act 1890 and the Electric Lighting (Scotland) Act 1902 to the Provost Magistrates and Councillors of the Burgh of Alloa in the County of Clackmannan in respect of the Burgh of Alloa.	
	Fife Electric Lighting Order 1911 Provisional Order granted by the Board of Trade under the Electric Lighting Acts 1882 and 1888 the Electric Lighting (Scotland) Act 1890 and the Electric Lighting (Scotland) Act 1902 to the Fife Tramway Light and Power Company Limited in respect to certain Burghs and Parishes in the County of Fife.	
	Grangemouth Electric Lighting (Amendment) Order 1911 Provisional Order granted by the Board of Trade under the Electric Lighting Acts 1882 and 1888 the Electric Lighting (Scotland) Act 1890 and the Electric Lighting (Scotland) Act 1902 to the Provost Magistrates and Councillors of the Burgh of Grangemouth in the County of Stirling amending the Grangemouth Electric Lighting Order 1905.	
Electric Lighting Orders Confirmation (No. 4) Act 1911	1 & 2 Geo. 5. c. clxiii	18 August 1911
An Act to confirm certain Provisional Orders made by the Board of Trade under the Electric Lighting Acts 1882 and 1888 relating to Chepping Wycombe Extension Harrow and District Sandwich Deal and Walmer and Sevenoaks.
	Chepping Wycombe (Extension) Electric Lighting Order 1911 Provisional Order granted by the Board of Trade under the Electric Lighting Acts 1882 and 1888 to the Wycombe (Borough) Electric Light and Power Company Limited in respect of part of the Borough of Chepping Wycombe and the Parishes of West Wycombe Chepping Wycombe Rural and Hughenden all in the Rural District of Wycombe and for the amendment of the Chepping Wycombe Electric Lighting Order 1894.	
	Harrow and District Electric Supply Order 1911 Provisional Order granted by the Board of Trade under the Electric Lighting Acts 1882 and 1888 to the Harrow Electric Light and Power Company Limited in respect of portions of the Urban District of Wealdstone in the County of Middlesex and for connecting that Company's generating station in Harrow-on-the-Hill with the said Urban District.	
	Sandwich Deal and Walmar Electric Lighting Order 1911 Provisional Order granted by the Board of Trade under the Electric Lighting Acts 1882 and 1888 to the Sandwich Deal and Walmer Electricity Supply Company Limited in respect of the Boroughs of Sandwich and Deal and the Urban District of Walmer all in the County of Kent.	
	Sevenoaks Electric Lighting Order 1911 Provisional Order granted by the Board of Trade under the Electric Lighting Acts 1882 and 1888 to the Urban District Council of Sevenoaks in respect of the Urban District of Sevenoaks in the County of Kent.	
Electric Lighting Order Confirmation (No. 5) Act 1911	1 & 2 Geo. 5. c. clxiv	18 August 1911
An Act to confirm a Provisional Order made by the Board of Trade under the Electric Lighting Acts 1882 and 1888 relating to Donaghadee.
	Donaghadee Electric Lighting Order 1911 Provisional Order granted by the Board of Trade under the Electric Lighting Acts 1882 and 1888 to the Donaghadee Urban District Council in respect of the Urban District of Donaghadee in the County of Down.	
Port of London (First Election of Members) Provisional Order Act 1911 (repealed)	1 & 2 Geo. 5. c. clxv	18 August 1911
An Act to confirm a Provisional Order made by the Board of Trade under the Port of London Act 1908 (Note: Port of London Act 1908 (8 Edw. 7. c. 68)) relating to the definition of dues for the purposes of the first election of members of the Port of London Authority under that Act. (Repealed by Port of London (Consolidation) Act 1920 (10 & 11 Geo. 5. c. clxxiii))
	Port of London (First Election of Members) Order 1911 Provisional Order pursuant to paragraph (18) of Part IV. of the First Schedule to the Port of London Act 1908 relating to the definition of dues for the purposes of the first election of members of the Port of London Authority under that Act.	
Gas Orders Confirmation (No. 1) Act 1911	1 & 2 Geo. 5. c. clxvi	18 August 1911
An Act to confirm certain Provisional Orders made by the Board of Trade under the Gas and Water Works Facilities Act 1870 relating to Alfreton Gas Barnstaple Gas Burnham Gas and Launceston Gas.
	Alfreton Gas Order 1911 Order empowering the Alfreton Gas Company to acquire additional land and to construct additional works for the manufacture and storage of gas and residual products.	
	Barnstaple Gas Order 1911 Order empowering the Barnstaple Gas Company to extend their limits of supply to raise additional capital and for other purposes.	
	Burnham Gas Order 1911 Order empowering the Burnham Gas Company Limited to maintain and continue gasworks and to manufacture and supply gas within the Urban District of Burnham-on-Crouch and the parishes of Creeksea Althorne and Latchingdon in the Rural District of Maldon all in the County of Essex and for other purposes.	
	Launceston Gas Order 1911 Order empowering the Launceston Gas Company Limited to maintain and continue gasworks and to manufacture and supply gas within the Borough of Launceston and parts of the Parishes of St. Thomas the Apostle Rural and St. Stephen by Launceston Rural in the Rural District of Launceston all in the County of Cornwall and for other purposes.	
Gas Orders Confirmation (No. 2) Act 1911	1 & 2 Geo. 5. c. clxvii	18 August 1911
An Act to confirm certain Provisional Orders made by the Board of Trade under the Gas and Water Works Facilities Act 1870 relating to Cannock Gas Clay Cross Gas Hythe and Sandgate Gas Lichfield Gas and Witney and District Gas.
	Cannock Gas Order 1911 Order empowering the Cannock Hednesford and District Gas Company Limited to supply gas in part of the Parish of Norton-under-Cannock known as Norton Canes the Townships of Shareshill Saredon Hatherton and Huntington and the Hazleslade Ward of the Parish of Brereton all in the County of Stafford to raise additional capital and for other purposes.	
	Clay Cross Gas Order 1911 Order empowering the Undertakers of the Clay Cross Gas Order 1902 to extend their limits of supply to raise additional Capital and for other purposes.	
	Hythe and Sandgate Gas Order 1911 Order empowering the Hythe and Sandgate Gas Company to raise Additional Capital and for other purposes.	
	Lichfield Gas Order 1911 Order extending the limits of supply of the Lichfield Gas Company and for other purposes.	
	Witney and District Gas Order 1911 Order empowering the Witney Gas and Coke Company Limited to maintain and continue their existing gasworks at Witney and to construct and maintain further works and to manufacture store and supply gas to and within the Parish and Urban District of Witney and certain other parishes and places all in the County of Oxford.	
Gas Orders Confirmation (No. 3) Act 1911	1 & 2 Geo. 5. c. clxviii	18 August 1911
An Act to confirm certain Provisional Orders made by the Board of Trade under the Gas and Water Works Facilities Act 1870 relating to Holyhead Gas Llangefni Gas Llanrwst Gas and Pwllheli Gas.
	Holyhead Gas Order 1911 Order authorising the maintenance and continuance of existing gasworks and the manufacture and supply of gas within the urban district of Holyhead and part of the rural district of Valley both in the county of Anglesey and for other purposes.	
	Llangefni Gas Order 1911 Order authorising the maintenance and continuance of existing gasworks and the manufacture and supply of gas within the urban district of Llangefni in the county of Anglesey and for other purposes.	
	Llanrwst Gas Order 1911 Order authorising the maintenance and continuance of existing gasworks and the manufacture and supply of gas within the urban district of Llanrwst in the county of Denbigh and for other purposes.	
	Pwllheli Gas Order 1911 Order authorising the maintenance and continuance of existing Gasworks and the Manufacture and Supply of Gas within the Borough of Pwllheli and Parish of Denio in the County of Carnarvon and for other purposes.	
Gas Orders Confirmation (No. 4) Act 1911	1 & 2 Geo. 5. c. clxix	18 August 1911
An Act to confirm certain Provisional Orders made by the Board of Trade under the Gas and Water Works Facilities Act 1870 relating to Busby and District Gas Longford Gas Preston Gas and Uxbridge Gas.
	Busby and District Gas Order 1911 Order empowering the Busby and District Gas Company Limited to maintain and continue their existing gasworks in the parishes of Cathcart and Mearns in the county of Renfrew and to supply gas within part of the parish of Mearns in the said county and within parts of the parishes of East Kilbride and Carmunnock in the county of Lanark and for other purposes.	
	Longford Gas Order 1911 Order empowering the Longford District Gas Company Limited to maintain and continue gasworks and to manufacture and supply gas within the urban district of Longford and adjacent parishes in the county of Longford and for other purposes.	
	Preston Gas Order 1911 Order authorising the Preston Gas Company to reduce the illuminating power of their gas and for other purposes.	
	Uxbridge Gas Order 1911 Order extending the limits of supply of the Uxbridge Gas Company and empowering that company to maintain continue and enlarge existing gasworks and to supply gas in certain parishes in the counties of Buckingham and Hertford and for other purposes.	
Gas and Water Orders Confirmation Act 1911	1 & 2 Geo. 5. c. clxx	18 August 1911
An Act to confirm certain Provisional Orders made by the Board of Trade under the Gas and Water Works Facilities Act 1870 relating to Blandford Water Gisborough Water North Pembrokeshire Water and Gas Sheringham Gas and Water and West Gloucestershire Water.
	Blandford Water Order 1911 Order extending the limits of supply of the Blandford Waterworks Company Limited authorising the Company to raise additional capital and for other purposes.	
	Gisborough Water Order 1911 Order conferring further powers upon the Undertakers of the Gisborough Water Undertaking and amending the Gisborough Water Order 1871 and the Gisborough Water Order 1880.	
	North Pembrokeshire Water and Gas Order 1911 Order empowering the North Pembrokeshire Water and Gas Company to raise unissued capital by preference shares and for other purposes.	
	Sheringham Gas and Water Order 1911 Order empowering the Sheringham Gas and Water Company to raise Additional Capital and for other purposes.	
	West Gloucestershire Water Order 1911 Order authorising the West Gloucestershire Water Company to take a supply of Water in bulk and to make agreements with reference thereto and for other purposes.	
Tramways Orders Confirmation Act 1911	1 & 2 Geo. 5. c. clxxi	18 August 1911
An Act to confirm certain Provisional Orders made by the Board of Trade under the Tramways Act 1870 (Note: Tramways Act 1870 (33 & 34 Vict. c. 78)) relating to Dartford and District Tramways and Dewsbury Corporation Tramways.
	Dartford and District Tramways Order 1911 Order authorising Balfour Beatty and Co. Limited to construct Tramways in the Parishes of Stone and Swanscombe in the Rural District of Dartford in the County of Kent and for other purposes.	
	Dewsbury Corporation Tramways Order 1911 Order authorising the Mayor Aldermen and Burgesses of the Borough of Dewsbury to construct an additional Tramway in their Borough.	
Salford Hundred Court of Record Act 1911 (repealed)	1 & 2 Geo. 5. c. clxxii	16 December 1911
An Act to amend the Salford Hundred Court of Record Act 1868. (Note: Salford Hundred Court of Record Act 1868 (31 & 32 Vict. c. cxxx)) (Repealed by Courts Act 1971 (c. 23))
Townhead Street (Sheffield) Baptist Chapel Scheme Confirmation Act 1911	1 & 2 Geo. 5. c. clxxiii	16 December 1911
An Act to confirm a Scheme of the Charity Commissioners for the application or management of the Charity consisting of the Particular Baptist Chapel Burial Ground and Trust Property in Townhead Street in the city of Sheffield.
	Scheme for the Application or Management of the Charity consisting of the Particular Baptist Chapel Burial Ground and Trust Property in Townhead Street in the City of Sheffield.	
Bridge and Causeway (Gloucester) Charity Scheme Confirmation Act 1911	1 & 2 Geo. 5. c. clxxiv	16 December 1911
An Act to confirm a Scheme of the Charity Commissioners for the application and management of the Charity in the city and county of Gloucester consisting of the yearly sum of eighty pounds applicable towards the reparation of the Bridge and Causeway lying between the said city and the village of Over.
	Scheme for the Application and Management of the Charity in the City and County of Gloucester consisting of the Yearly Sum of Eighty Pounds applicable towards the Reparation of the Bridge and Causeway lying between the said City and the Village of Over.	
Birkby Baptist Chapel Scheme Confirmation Act 1911	1 & 2 Geo. 5. c. clxxv	16 December 1911
An Act to confirm a Scheme of the Charity Commissioners for the application or management of the Charity consisting of the fund representing the net proceeds of the sale of the Particular Baptist Chapel which was situated at Birkby in the Parish of Huddersfield in the West Riding of the County of York.
	Scheme for the Application or Management of the Charity consisting of the Fund representing the net Proceeds of Sale of the Particular Baptist Chapel which was situated at Birkby in the Parish of Huddersfield in the West Riding of York.	
Humberstone Wesley Chapel Scheme Confirmation Act 1911	1 & 2 Geo. 5. c. clxxvi	16 December 1911
An Act to confirm a Scheme of the Charity Commissioners for the application or management of the Charity consisting of the Chapel known as Wesley Chapel in the Parish of Humberstone in the County of Leicester.
	Scheme for the Application or Management of the Charity consisting of the Chapel known as Wesley Chapel in the Parish of Humberstone in the County of Leicester.	
Epping Chapel Endowment Scheme Confirmation Act 1911	1 & 2 Geo. 5. c. clxxvii	16 December 1911
An Act to confirm a Scheme of the Charity Commissioners for the application or management of (1) the Charity of John Walkley and the Charity of Edward Dean which were endowments of the former Chapel of St. John the Baptist in Epping in the County of Essex and (2) the Ecclesiastical Charity of Thomas Loft.
	Scheme for the Application or Management of—: 1. The following Charities which were endowments of the former Chapel of St. John the Baptist in Epping in the County of Essex viz.:- The Charity of John Walkley and The Charity of Edward Dean; and 2. The Ecclesiastical Charity of Thomas Loft.	
Stonehaven Harbour Order Confirmation Act 1911 (repealed)	1 & 2 Geo. 5. c. clxxviii	16 December 1911
An Act to confirm a Provisional Order under the Private Legislation Procedure (Scotland) Act 1899 relating to Stonehaven Harbour Stonehaven Harbour. (Repealed by Grampian Regional Council (Harbours) Order Confirmation Act 1987 (c. x))
	Stonehaven Harbour Order 1911 Provisional Order to revive the powers and extend the time for the construction of Works at the Harbour of Stonehaven in the County of Kincardine authorised by the Stonehaven Harbour Order 1891 and extended by the Stonehaven Harbour Orders 1896 and 1905 to grant additional borrowing powers to the Trustees and for other purposes.	
Commons Regulation (Burrington) Provisional Order Confirmation Act 1911	1 & 2 Geo. 5. c. clxxix	16 December 1911
An Act to confirm a Provisional Order under the Inclosure Acts 1845 to 1899 relating to Burrington Commons in the County of Somerset.
	Commons Regulation (Burrington) Provisional Order 1911 Provisional Order for the Regulation of Burrington Commons.	
Commons Regulation (Winton and Kaber) Provisional Order Confirmation Act 1911	1 & 2 Geo. 5. c. clxxx	16 December 1911
An Act to confirm a Provisional Order under the Inclosure Acts 1845 to 1899 relating to Winton and Kaber Commons in the County of Westmorland and the North Riding of the County of York.
	Commons Regulation (Winton and Kaber) Provisional Order 1911 Provisional Order for the Regulation of Winton and Kaber Commons.	
Kelso Water Order Confirmation Act 1911	1 & 2 Geo. 5. c. clxxxi	16 December 1911
An Act to confirm a Provisional Order under the Private Legislation Procedure (Scotland) Act 1899 relating to Kelso Water.
	Kelso Water Order 1911 Provisional Order to authorise the Provost Magistrates and Councillors of the Burgh of Kelso to provide an additional water supply and to construct and maintain new waterworks and for other purposes.	
Glasgow and South Western Railway Order Confirmation Act 1911	1 & 2 Geo. 5. c. clxxxii	16 December 1911
An Act to confirm a Provisional Order under the Private Legislation Procedure (Scotland) Act 1899 relating to the Glasgow and South Western Railway.
	Glasgow and South Western Railway Order 1911 Provisional Order for conferring further powers on the Glasgow and South Western Railway Company for the construction of works and the acquisition of lands for empowering the Company to create and substitute debenture stock of the Company for the shares of the Ayr and Maybole Junction Railway Company for dissolving that company and for other purposes.	
Lerwick Harbour Order Confirmation Act 1911	1 & 2 Geo. 5. c. clxxxiii	16 December 1911
An Act to confirm a Provisional Order under the Private Legislation Procedure (Scotland) Act 1899 relating to Lerwick Harbour.
	Lerwick Harbour Order 1911 Provisional Order to authorise the erection of New Works by the Trustees of the Port and Harbour of Lerwick to authorise the Trustees to borrow money and to levy Tonnage Dues and for other purposes.	
Local Government Board's Provisional Orders Confirmation (No. 7) Act 1911	1 & 2 Geo. 5. c. clxxxiv	16 December 1911
An Act to confirm certain Provisional Orders of the Local Government Board relating to Christchurch and Sheffield.
	Christchurch (Extension) Order 1911 Provisional Order made in pursuance of Sections 54 and 59 of the Local Government Act 1888.	
	Sheffield (Extension) Order 1911 Provisional Order made in pursuance of Sections 54 and 59 of the Local Government Act 1888.	
Local Government Board's Provisional Orders Confirmation (No. 10) Act 1911	1 & 2 Geo. 5. c. clxxxv	16 December 1911
An Act to confirm certain Provisional Orders of the Local Government Board relating to Cambridge and Southport.
	Cambridge (Extension) Order 1911 Provisional Order made in pursuance of Sections 54 and 59 of the Local Government Act 1888.	
	Southport (Extension) Order 1911 Provisional Order made in pursuance of Sections 54 and 59 of the Local Government Act 1888.	
Pier and Harbour Order Confirmation (No. 4) Act 1911	1 & 2 Geo. 5. c. clxxxvi	16 December 1911
An Act to confirm a Provisional Order made by the Board of Trade under the General Pier and Harbour Act 1861 relating to Ullapool.
	Ullapool Pier Order 1911 Provisional Order for the Construction Maintenance and Regиlation of Piers and Works at Ullapool in the Parish of Lochbroom in the County of Ross and Cromarty and for other purposes.	
Thorney Drainage Act 1911	1 & 2 Geo. 5. c. clxxxvii	16 December 1911
An Act to constitute a drainage district in the Isle of Ely to incorporate and confer powers upon a drainage board for that district to make provisions with respect to the sewerage of part of the said district to empower the said board to supply water within that part of the said district and for other purposes.
Saint Mary Radcliffe Rectory Act 1911	1 & 2 Geo. 5. c. clxxxviii	16 December 1911
An Act for transferring to the Ecclesiastical Commissioners certain endowments of the rectory of Saint Mary Radcliffe in the County Palatine of Lancaster and for providing for the re-endowment of the said rectory and for the transfer of the advowson to the See of Manchester and for the application of the income and capital of the transferred endowments and for other ecclesiastical purposes.
Saint Mary Prestwich Rectory Act 1911	1 & 2 Geo. 5. c. clxxxix	16 December 1911
An Act for transferring to the Ecclesiastical Commissioners certain endowments of the rectory of Saint Mary Prestwich in the County Palatine of Lancaster and for providing for the re-endowment of the said rectory and for the transfer of the advowson to the See of Manchester and for the application of the income and capital of the transferred endowments and for other ecclesiastical purposes.
Belfast Corporation Act 1911	1 & 2 Geo. 5. c. cxc	16 December 1911
An Act to enable the lord mayor aldermen and citizens of the city of Belfast to construct and work additional tramways in the city to make street improvements to construct works and exercise powers for prevention of flooding to acquire lands to make provisions for the better control of persons practising midwifery in the city to establish a textile testing house to enable the Corporation to raise further money and to confer various further powers upon the Corporation with respect to streets and buildings in the city and in relation to sanitary matters and the health and good government of the city and for other purposes.

=== Private and personal acts ===
Short title	Citation	Royal assent
Long title
Westbury Estate Act 1911	1 & 2 Geo. 5. c. 1 Pr.	18 August 1911
An Act to enable the trustees of the marriage settlement of Agatha Lady Westbury to raise certain moneys out of the capital moneys subject to such settlement and to use and apply the same in the payment off and discharge of certain debts and mortgages of or created by her son the Honourable Richard Bethell and to confirm and make valid a resettlement of the residue of such capital moneys and for other purposes.
Lord Acton's Nationality Act 1911 (Note: This act was not printed by the King's Printer)	1 & 2 Geo. 5. c. 2 Pr.	16 December 1911
An Act to remove doubts as to the nationality of Richard Maximilian Baron Acton and his issue.
Maxwell's Divorce Act 1911	1 & 2 Geo. 5. c. 3 Pr.	16 December 1911
An Act to dissolve the marriage of Josephine Turner Maxwell of Crinken Abbey Shankill in the county of Dublin with Henry Pendleton Maxwell her husband and to enable her to marry again and for other purposes.
Pilkington's Divorce Act 1911	1 & 2 Geo. 5. c. 4 Pr.	16 December 1911
An Act to dissolve the marriage of Alexander John McDonnell Pilkington of 14 Herbert Place in the city of Dublin in Ireland Esquire with Dorothy Pilkington his wife and to enable him to marry again and for other purposes.
Watson's Divorce Act 1911	1 & 2 Geo. 5. c. 5 Pr.	16 December 1911
An Act to dissolve the marriage of Herbert Watson of Mount Nephin Newtownbreda in the county of Down in Ireland Esquire Bachelor of Engineering with Rosanna Gertrude Watson his now wife and to enable him to marry again and for other purposes.

=== Sources ===
- The Public General Statutes. 1911 – via Google Books.
- Local and Personal Laws – via Google Books.

== See also ==
- List of acts of the Parliament of the United Kingdom
