= Telephone Transfer Act 1911 =

Act of the Parliament of the United Kingdom

Telephone Transfer Act 1911 (Note: Section 10(1).)
- Act of Parliament
- Parliament of the United Kingdom
- Long title: An Act to make provision in relation to the transfer to the Postmaster General of the plant, property, and assets, and of the staff of the National Telephone Company, Limited, and for the further improvement of Telephonic Communication.
- Citation: 1 & 2 Geo. 5. c. 26
- Territorial extent: United Kingdom

Dates
- Royal assent: 18 August 1911
- Commencement: 18 August 1911 (Note: The Acts of Parliament (Commencement) Act 1793.)
- Repealed: 27 July 1981
Other legislation
Amended by	Telephone Transfer Amendment Act 1911; Statute Law Revision Act 1950; Statute Law Revision Act 1953
Repealed by	British Telecommunications Act 1981

Status: Repealed

Text of statute as originally enacted

Telephone Transfer Amendment Act 1911 (Note: Section 2(1).)
- Act of Parliament
- Parliament of the United Kingdom
- Long title: An Act to amend the Telephone Transfer Act, 1911, so as to authorise a payment to be made to the National Telephone Company, Limited, of a sum on account of the Telephone Purchase Money before the amount thereof is finally ascertained.
- Citation: 1 & 2 Geo. 5. c. 56
- Territorial extent: United Kingdom

Dates
- Royal assent: 16 December 1911
- Commencement: 16 December 1911
- Repealed: 22 December 1927
Other legislation
Amends	Telephone Transfer Act 1911
Repealed by	Statute Law Revision Act 1927

Status: Repealed

Text of statute as originally enacted

The Telephone Transfer Act 1911 (1 & 2 Geo. 5. c. 26) was an act of the Parliament of the United Kingdom, which nationalised the telephone companies.

The National Telephone Company had become a monopoly and so the Liberal government decided to take it into public hands.

== Subsequent developments ==
Sections 1–4 of the act were repealed by section 1(1) of, and the first schedule to, the Statute Law Revision Act 1950 (14 Geo. 6. c. 6), which came into force on 23 May 1950.

In section 9 of the act, the words from " The expression " where first occurring, to " which is not discharged " were repealed by section 1 of, and the first schedule to, the Statute Law Revision Act 1953 (2 & 3 Eliz. 2. c. 5), which came into force on 18 December 1953.

The whole act was repealed by section 89(1) of, and part I of schedule 6 to, the British Telecommunications Act 1981, which came into force on 27 July 1981.

== See also ==
- UK enterprise law
- Telegraph Act 1868

== Bibliography ==
- "The Telephone Transfer Act 1911". Halsbury's Statutes of England. Third Edition. Butterworths. London. 1971. Volume 35. Page 68.
- W H Aggs. "Telephone Transfer Act, 1911". Chitty's Statutes of Practical Utility. Sixth Edition. 1914. Volume 17. Title "Telegraph". Page 366.
- W de Bracy Herbert (ed). The Practical Statutes of the Session 1911. Horace Cox. London. 1912.
