= Governors' Pensions Act 1957 =

Act of the Parliament of the United Kingdom

Governors' Pensions Act 1957 (Note: Section 19.)
- Act of Parliament
- Parliament of the United Kingdom
- Long title: An Act to consolidate the Governors' Pensions Acts, 1911 to 1956.
- Citation: 5 & 6 Eliz. 2. c. 62
- Territorial extent: United Kingdom

Dates
- Royal assent: 31 July 1957
- Commencement: 31 July 1957 (Note: The Acts of Parliament (Commencement) Act 1793.)
- Repealed: 23 May 1973
Other legislation
Amends	See § Repealed enactments
Repeals/revokes	See § Repealed enactments
Repealed by	Overseas Pensions Act 1973

Status: Repealed

Text of statute as originally enacted

The Governors' Pensions Act 1957 (5 & 6 Eliz. 2. c. 62) was an act of the Parliament of the United Kingdom that consolidated enactments relating to pensions payable to governors of parts of Her Majesty's dominions, protectorates, and trust territories.

== Provisions ==
=== Repealed enactments ===
Section 18(2) of the act repealed 6 enactments, listed in the schedule to the act.

Citation	Short title	Extent of repeal
1 & 2 Geo. 5. c. 24	Pensions (Governors of Dominions &c.) Act 1911	The whole act.
19 & 20 Geo. 5. c. 16	Pensions (Governors of Dominions, &c.) Act 1929	The whole act.
26 Geo. 5 & 1 Edw. 8. c. 25	Pensions (Governors of Dominions, &c.) Act 1936	The whole act.
11 & 12 Geo. 6. c. 12	Pensions (Governors of Dominions, &c.) Act 1947	The whole act.
12, 13 & 14 Geo. 6. c. 44	Superannuation Act 1949	In section sixty-three, in subsection (2), the words "or of the Pensions (Governors of Dominions, etc.) Acts, 1911 to 1947" and the words "or service as a Governor within the meaning of the last-mentioned Acts".
4 & 5 Eliz. 2. c. 64	Governors' Pensions Act 1956	The whole act.

== Subsequent developments ==
The whole act was repealed by section 6(2) of, and schedule 2 to, the Overseas Pensions Act 1973, which came into force on 23 May 1973.
