= Pensions (Governors of Dominions &c.) Act 1911 =

Act of the Parliament of the United Kingdom

Pensions (Governors of Dominions, &c.) Act 1911 (Note: Section 12(3).)
- Act of Parliament
- Parliament of the United Kingdom
- Long title: An Act to consolidate and amend the Law relating to the payment of Pensions to Governors of any part of His Majesty's Dominions, or any British Protectorate, or persons holding a similar office.
- Citation: 1 & 2 Geo. 5. c. 24
- Territorial extent: United Kingdom

Dates
- Royal assent: 18 August 1911
- Commencement: 18 August 1911 (Note: The Acts of Parliament (Commencement) Act 1793.)
- Repealed: 31 July 1957

Other legislation
- Amends: See § Repealed enactments
- Repeals/revokes: See § Repealed enactments
- Amended by: Pensions (Governors of Dominions, &c.) Act 1929; Pensions (Governors of Dominions, &c.) Act 1936; Pensions (Governors of Dominions, &c.) Act 1947; Governors' Pensions Act 1956
- Repealed by: Governors' Pensions Act 1957

Status: Repealed

Text of statute as originally enacted

The Pensions (Governors of Dominions, &c.) Act 1911 (1 & 2 Geo. 5. c. 24) was an act of the Parliament of the United Kingdom that consolidated enactments related to the payment of pensions to governors of parts of His Majesty's dominions and British protectorates.

== Provisions ==
=== Repealed enactments ===
Section 12(2) of the act repealed 3 enactments, listed in the schedule to the act.

Citation	Short title	Extent of repeal
28 & 29 Vict. c. 113	Colonial Governors (Pensions) Act 1865	The whole act.
35 & 36 Vict. c. 29	Colonial Governors (Pensions) Act 1872	The whole act.
50 & 51 Vict. c. 13	Pensions (Colonial Service) Act 1887	Sections three, four, and five.

== Subsequent developments ==
The whole act was repealed by section 18(2) of, and the schedule to, the Governors' Pensions Act 1957 (5 & 6 Eliz. 2. c. 62), which came into force on 31 July 1957.
