= Transport in Belfast =

Transportation systems in the city of Belfast, Northern Ireland, include road, air, rail, and sea. It is still a relatively car-dependent city; however, it is also served by a comprehensive rail and bus network. Belfast also ran electric trams prior to 1954. The city has two major airports, and the Port of Belfast is the busiest ferry port on the island of Ireland.

== History ==
In the Victorian city of Belfast, transport consisted of horse-drawn carts on cobbled streets. Some of these streets in the Cathedral Quarter are still cobbled. As the city expanded rapidly during the Industrial Revolution, the need grew for public transport to carry workers in and out of the city. The Belfast Street Tramways Company replaced carts with horse-drawn trams and the Cavehill and Whitewell Tramway company ran a steam tramway from the outlying villages of Whitewell and Glengormley into Belfast. Belfast Zoo was created in 1934 from Bellevue Gardens, a playground and pleasure gardens at the end of the Cavehill line. In 1905, the Belfast Corporation took over and electrified the city's tram network. The trams were partially replaced by trolleybuses from 1938, and finally replaced by buses in 1954.

Recent developments have been proposed in the Belfast Metropolitan Transport Plan, launched by the Minister for Regional Development in November 2004. It aimed to set a new direction for transport in the city following decades of under-investment.

== City layout ==
Belfast remains a divided city. There are 14 neighborhoods in the inner-city of Belfast some of which are divided by peace lines. These walls were erected by the British Army, after August 1969, at the beginning of the Troubles. They were built in an effort to deal with the nightly rioting in the city at the time, and to stop intimidation and population flight. There was very little community consultation throughout this process.

Since the 1970s, the inner city numbers have dropped and the Greater Belfast suburb population has grown. As with many cities, Belfast's inner city is currently characterised by the elderly, students and single young people, while families tend to live on the periphery. Socio-economic areas radiate out from the Central Business District, with a pronounced wedge of affluence extending out the Malone Road to the south. An area of greater deprivation extends to the west of the city. In fact the areas around the Falls and Shankill Roads are the most deprived wards in Northern Ireland.

=== Routes ===
Some important arterial routes into Belfast include:

- York Street/York Road/Shore Road
- Antrim Road
- Oldpark Road
- Crumlin Road
- Shankill Road/Woodvale Road/Ballygomartin Road
- Divis Street/Falls Road/Glen Road
- Grosvenor Road/Springfield Road
- Andersonstown Road/Stewartstown Road
- Donegall Road
- Lisburn Road
- University Road/Malone Road
- Ormeau Road
- Ravenhill Road
- Woodstock Link/Woodstock Road/Cregagh Road
- Castlereagh Street/Castlereagh Road
- Albertbridge Road
- Newtownards Road/Upper Newtownards Road
- Holywood Road

=== Westlink ===
The most significant road scheme in Belfast for some years began early in 2006, with the upgrading of two junctions along the Westlink dual carriageway to grade separated standard. The Westlink, a dual carriageway skirting the western edge of the City Centre, connects all three Belfast motorways and has suffered from chronic congestion for some years. The work will cost £103.9 million and is scheduled for completion in 2009. Some commentators have argued that this may simply create a new bottleneck at the at-grade York Street intersection until that too is converted to a fully free-flowing grade separated junction, which in 2007 was expected to take place between 2011 and 2016.

=== Cycling ===
The Lagan and Lough Cycle Way, part of Route 9 of the National Cycle Network, runs through the city centre along the Laganside promenade and linking north to Jordanstown through the docks and along the lough shore and south-west to Lisburn along the Lagan towpath.

== Cars and buses ==
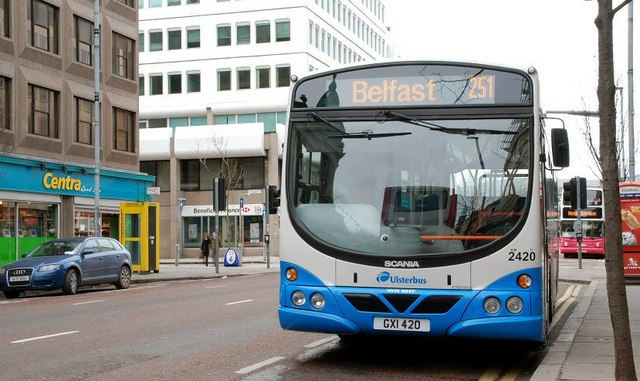
"Country" bus, Belfast

In the nineteenth century due to suburbanization omnibuses became in to use and in 1869 were recorded running hourly on the Malone Road, Lisburn Road, Antrim Road, County Down Road to Sydenham hourly. Belfast is a now a relatively car-dependent city, by European standards, with an extensive road network including the ten lane M2 motorway. A recent survey of how people travel in Northern Ireland showed that people in Belfast made 77% of all journeys by car, 11% by public transport and 6% on foot. It also showed that Belfast has 0.70 cars per household compared to figures of 1.18 in the East and 1.14 in the West of Northern Ireland.

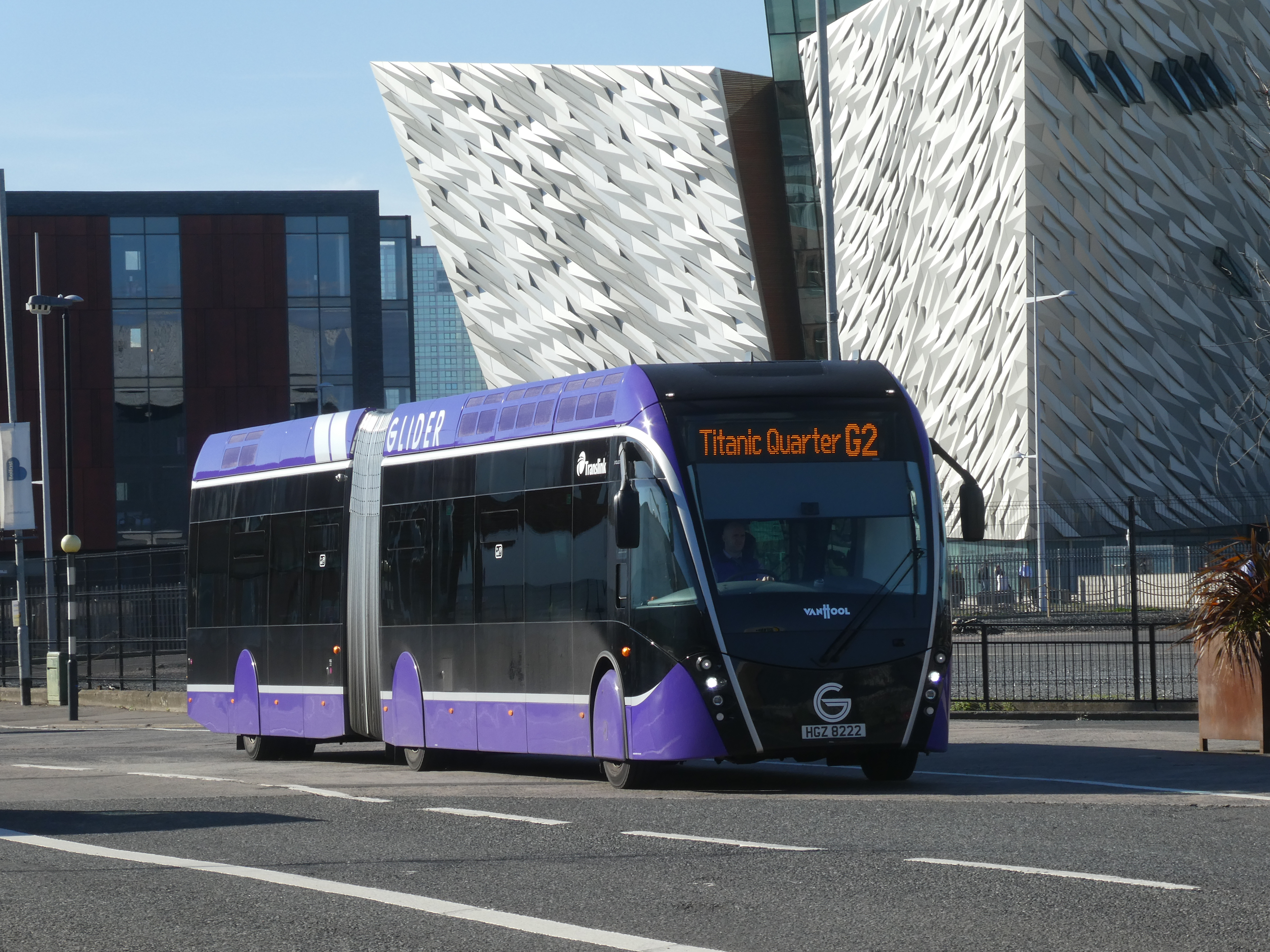
Glider bus rapid transit services opened in 2018.

Most public transport in Northern Ireland is operated by the subsidiaries of Translink. Bus services in the city proper and the nearer suburbs are operated by Translink Metro, with services focusing on linking residential districts with the City Centre on twelve quality bus corridors running along main radial roads, resulting in poor connections between different suburban areas. More distant suburbs are served by Ulsterbus. A small number of private operators are also present, including Aircoach who operate a non-stop route from Belfast to Dublin City, via Dublin Airport which competes with services offered by Translink.

Black taxis are common in the city, operating on a share basis in some areas. Separate associations serving nationalist and unionist areas operate throughout Belfast. During the Troubles, nationalist taxi drivers in West Belfast and Ardoyne became targets for loyalist assassination campaigns. Today black taxis take tourists on tours of the city's sectarian murals. They are now outnumbered by private hire minicabs.

== Airports ==
The city has two airports: The Belfast International Airport offers domestic, European and transatlantic flights and is located north of the city, near Lough Neagh while the George Best Belfast City Airport is closer to the city centre, adjacent to Belfast Lough. In 2005, Belfast International Airport was the 11th busiest commercial airport in the UK, accounting for just over 2% of all UK terminal passengers while the George Best Belfast City Airport was the 16th busiest and had 1% of UK terminal passengers.

- The Belfast International Airport Aldergrove offers domestic, European and transatlantic flights and is located 21 kilometres northwest of the city, near Lough Neagh. It was opened in 1917 as a training establishment for the Royal Flying Corps during the First World War. A new Executive Aviation Terminal was opened in 1987 and annual passenger numbers reached 4.5 million in 2004. In 2005, it was the 11th busiest commercial airport in the UK, accounting for just over 2% of all UK terminal passengers.
- The George Best Belfast City Airport, named after the city's most famous footballing son, is closer to the city centre, beside Belfast Lough. Previously named the Harbour Airport, it was opened on 16 March 1938 by Anne Chamberlain, the wife of the British Prime Minister at the time. It opened to passenger flights in 1983 and opened a new passenger terminal in 2001. The airport was officially renamed after George Best on 22 May 2006, the day he would have celebrated his 60th birthday. In 2005, it was the 16th busiest airport in the UK and had 1% of all UK terminal passengers.

== Railways ==
Bus and rail public transport in Northern Ireland is operated by subsidiaries of Translink. Bus services in the city proper and the nearer suburbs are operated by Translink Metro, with services focusing on linking residential districts with the City Centre on twelve quality bus corridors running along main radial roads, resulting in poor connections between different suburban areas. More distant suburbs are served by Ulsterbus.

Northern Ireland Railways provides suburban services along three lines running through Belfast's northern suburbs to Carrickfergus and Larne, eastwards towards Bangor and south-westwards towards Lisburn and Portadown. This service is known as the Belfast Suburban Rail system.

Northern Ireland Railways is the sole public railway operator in Northern Ireland. The network serving Greater Belfast is known as Belfast Suburban Rail and is owned by Translink. These provide rail services along four major routes:

- Belfast-Larne railway line runs through Belfast's northern suburbs to Carrickfergus and Larne
- Belfast-Bangor railway line runs eastwards towards Bangor
- Belfast-Newry railway line and south-westwards through Lisburn and Portadown to Newry
- Belfast-Derry railway line and north eastern through Antrim and Coleraine to Derry

Some important rail stations in Belfast include Lanyon Place, and—due to open in the autumn of 2024, replacing the Great Victoria Street, which closed in May 2024—Belfast Grand central station, Botanic, City Hospital, Yorkgate. The Enterprise is a cross-border inter-city train service between Dublin Connolly in the Republic of Ireland and Belfast Central in Northern Ireland. It is jointly operated by Iarnród Éireann (IE) and Northern Ireland Railways (NIR).

=== Ferry and onward links ===
From the Port of Belfast ferries operated by Stena Line connect to Cairnryan in Scotland where onward bus links to Ayr and Stranraer stations are available providing a rail link onwards to Glasgow Central.

Direct coach services between Belfast Grand Central Station and Glasgow Buchanan Bus Station are also available and are operated by:

- Scottish Citylink and Ulsterbus jointly as service 923
- Hannon Coach

=== Proposed transport ===
In 2007, a feasibility study was carried out to construct a light rail system in the city, initially along two routes, eventually along four. It had been compared to Luas, the tram system in Dublin.

These proposals included:

- EWAY – East of city and Dundonald
- WWAY – West of city
- CITI – Titanic Quarter and George Best Belfast City Airport
- SupeRoute – South of City

In 2008, the Department for Regional Development issued a report suggesting that a "high class bus-based network could cut commuting times while costing significantly less".

By 2017, this transpired into the Belfast Rapid Transport System. The new service will be run by Translink and is expected to be operational by September 2018. It is expected that the service will transform the public transport system in Belfast. The route will be served by several new 18-metre Glider vehicles, specifically designed for Belfast, which will feature real time passenger information, destination announcements, CCTV, free Wi-Fi, USB charging facilities and air conditioning. These Glider vehicles are expected to operate every 7–8 minutes throughout the working day. The proposed route will link East Belfast, West Belfast and the Titanic Quarter, via the city centre. The service is expected to help meet the future transport needs of Belfast.

== Seaport ==
Isle of Man Steam Packet route map

The Port of Belfast is the busiest ferry port on the island of Ireland with over 1.2 million passengers annually. Belfast also has a large port, used for exporting and importing goods and for passenger ferry services. Stena Line run regular services to Cairnryan in Scotland using their Superfast VII & VIII vessels, with a crossing time of around 2 hours 15 minutes. They also run a passenger/cargo ferry to and from Liverpool using the Stena Lagan or Stena Mersey, with a crossing time of eight hours. There are seasonal sailings to Douglas, Isle of Man that are operated by the Isle of Man Steam Packet Company (formally SeaCat).

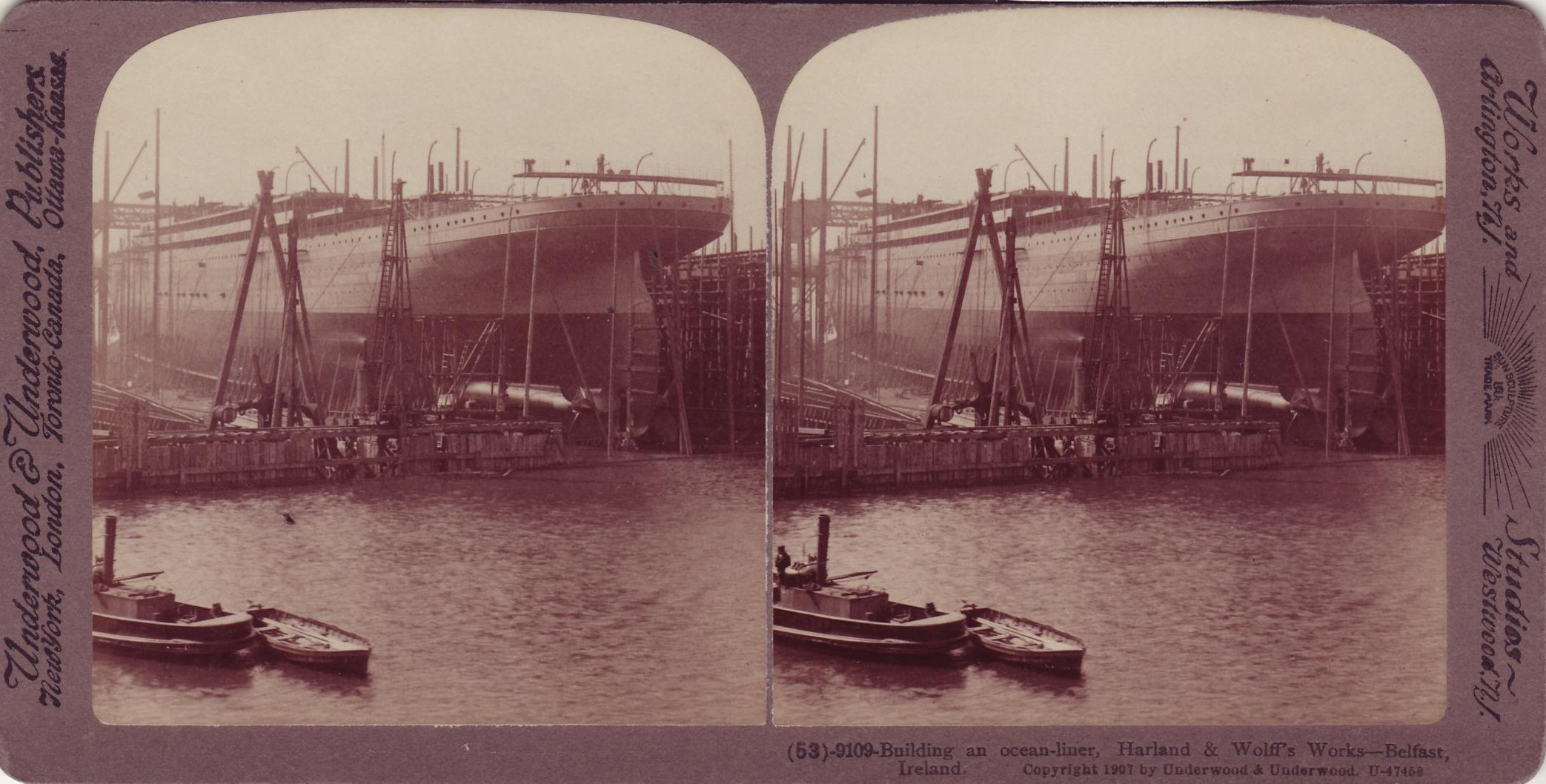
Harland & Wolff shipyard in 1907

The natural inlet of Belfast Lough gives Belfast its own port. As the city developed, this became the major avenue for trade with Britain and later Europe and North America. In the mid-seventeenth century, Belfast exported beef, butter, hides, tallow and corn and it imported coal, cloth, wine, brandy, paper, timber and tobacco. At the beginning of the eighteenth century, Belfast's significant trade made it the richest commercial town in the north of Ireland. Around this time, the linen trade in Northern Ireland blossomed and by the middle of the eighteenth century, one fifth of all the linen exported from Ireland was shipped from Belfast Harbour.

As the Industrial Revolution arrived, the port provided the outlet for the thriving linen and shipbuilding trades. Belfast harbour was dredged in 1845 to provide deeper berths for larger ships. Donegall Quay was built out into the river as the harbour was developed further and trade flourished. The Harland & Wolff shipbuilding firm was created in 1861 and by the time the Titanic was built in Belfast in 1912, they boasted the largest shipyard in the world.

It is also the biggest gateway for both the import and export of goods in Northern Ireland, receiving 6,000 vessels, and half a million freight units per year. The Harbour Estate is also Northern Ireland's leading logistics & distribution hub.

== See also ==
- Transport in the United Kingdom
- Transport in Ireland
