= Cavehill and Whitewell Tramway =

Tram system in Northern Ireland, later part of Belfast Tramways

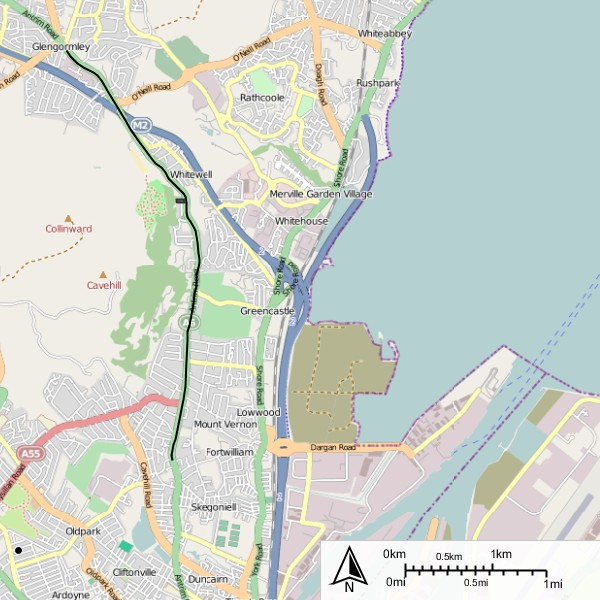
- Map of the route of the Cavehill and Whitewell Tramway

Operation
- Locale: Cavehill, Whitewell
- Open: 1 July 1882
- Close: 2 June 1911
- Status: Closed

Infrastructure
- Track gauge: 4 ft 8 1/2 in (1,435 mm)
- Propulsion systems: Steam, Horse and Electric

Statistics
- Route length: 3.1 miles (5.0 km)

The Cavehill and Whitewell Tramway operated steam powered, then horse drawn and finally electric tramway services between Cavehill and Whitewell in Belfast, Ireland between 1882 and 1911. It was subsumed into Belfast Corporation Tramways.

== History ==
The tramway was authorised by the Cavehill and Whitewell Tramway Order of 1881. Track-laying started on 23 January 1882, an inspection was undertaken by Major General Charles Scrope Hutchinson on 16 June 1882, and he declared it fit for traffic. The line was opened on 1 July 1882 with just one steam engine, ordered from Kitson and Company. The route ran from Chichester Park Gate at the terminus of the Belfast Street Tramways line and terminated at the Glengormley Arms. By 1892 the steam tram engines were giving trouble and horses were employed to maintain the service. By 1896, all steam engines had been sold. By 1905, the company had concluded a contract with British Electric Traction for the electrification of the line and this was completed and opened to the public on 12 February 1906. This modernisation project had cost £43,555. In 1910 Belfast Corporation made an offer to purchase the company, and this agreement received Royal Assent on 26 July 1910, however, legal difficulties delayed the formal takeover until 1911.

== Fleet ==
The steam tram engines were obtained from Kitson and Company:

- No. 1 – Kitson Works No T/49 1882
- No. 2 – Kitson Works No T/54 1882 (sold in 1891 to the Vale of Clyde Tramway Company)
- No. 3 – Kitson Works No T/51 1886 (bought from D. and W. Grant, Belfast)

There were ten electric trams bought from Brush Electrical Engineering Company of Loughborough in 1906. Two were sold to Mansfield and District Light Railways in 1912.

== Closure ==
Subsequent to the closure of the Cavehill and Whitewell Tramway in 1911, the route was operated by Belfast Corporation Tramways until 1949, when the trams were replaced by trolley buses.
