= Glider (Belfast) =

Bus rapid transit system in Northern Ireland

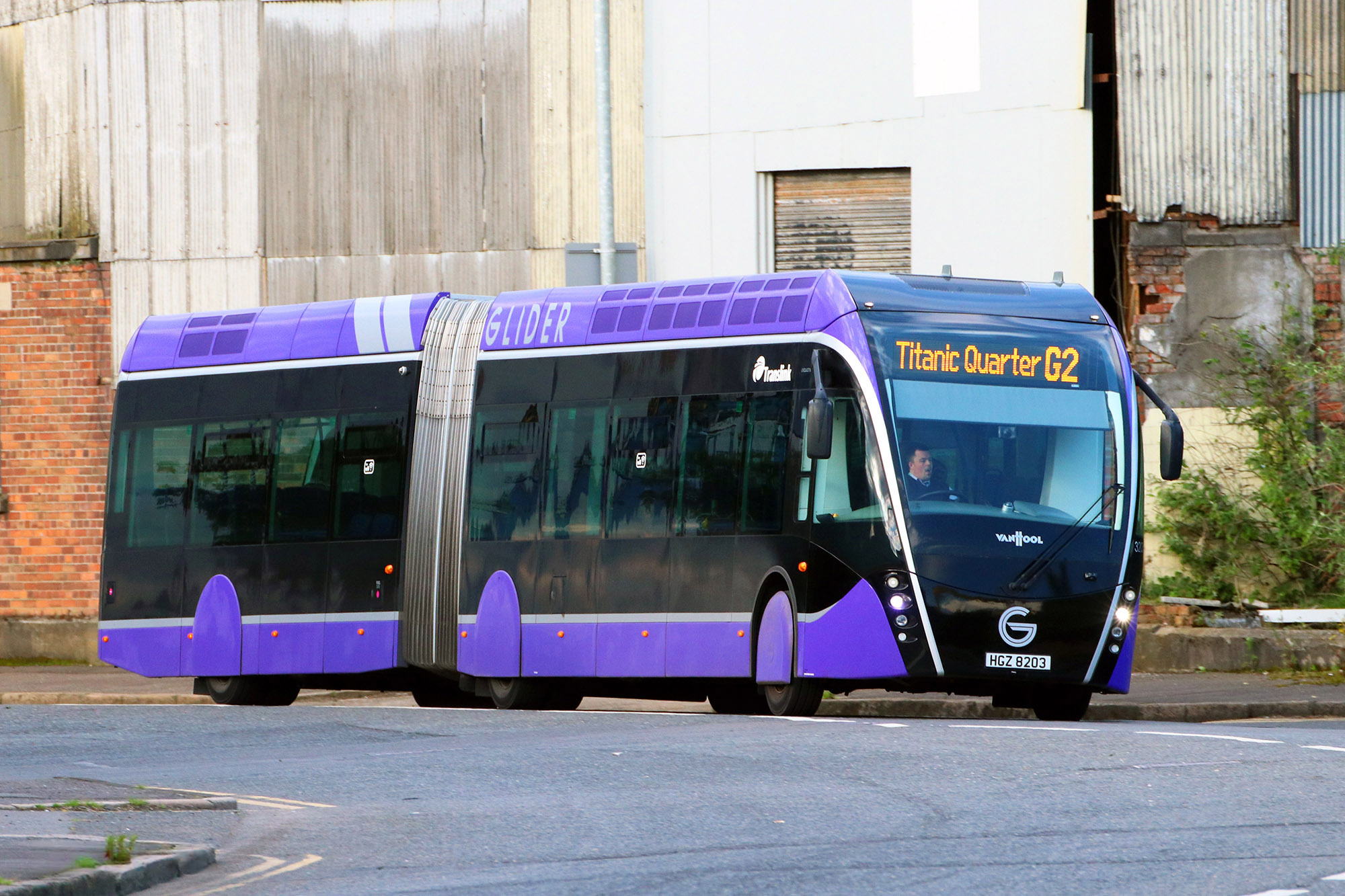
A Glider bus in Belfast in June 2019

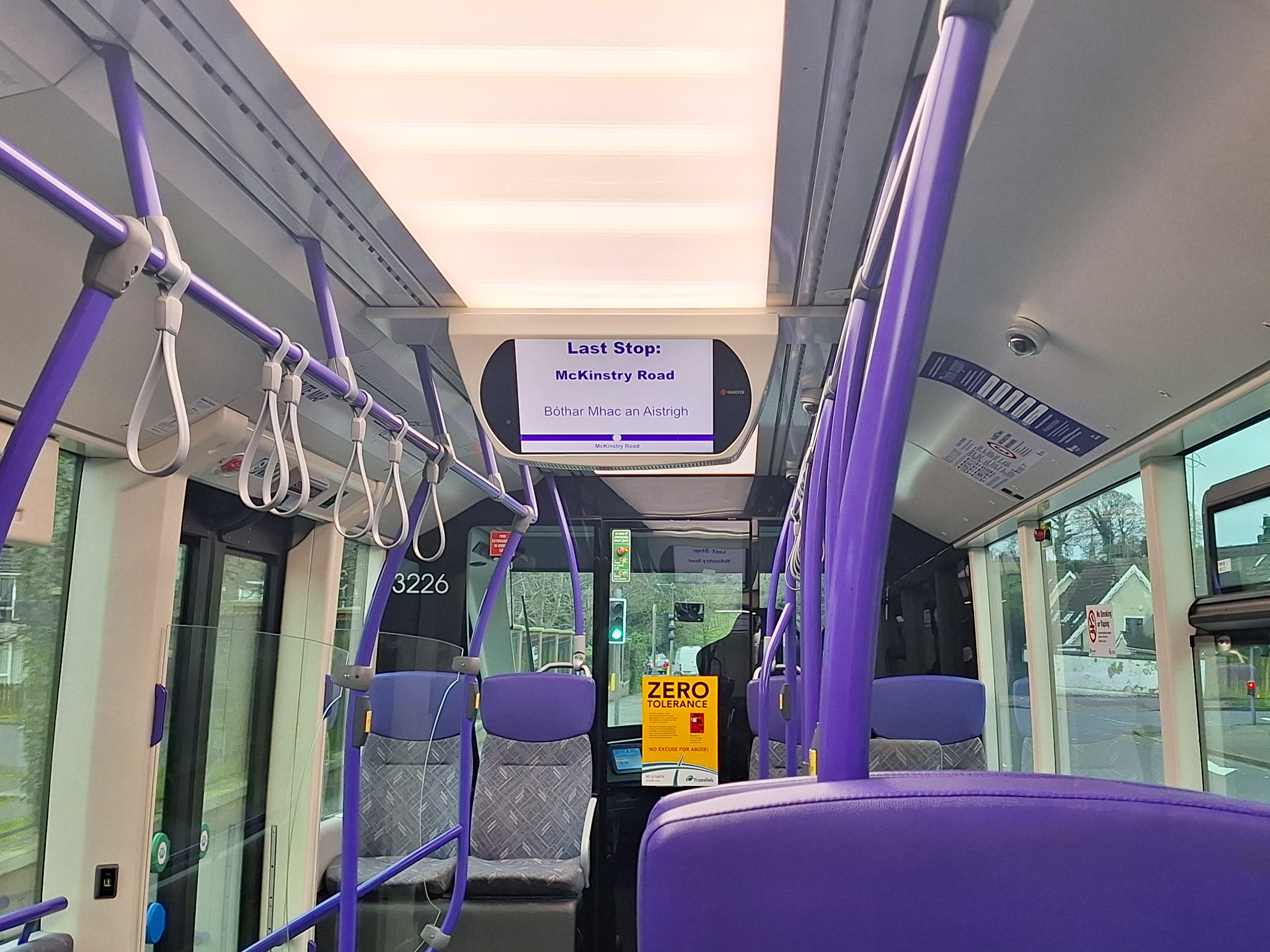
Interior of a Glider vehicle

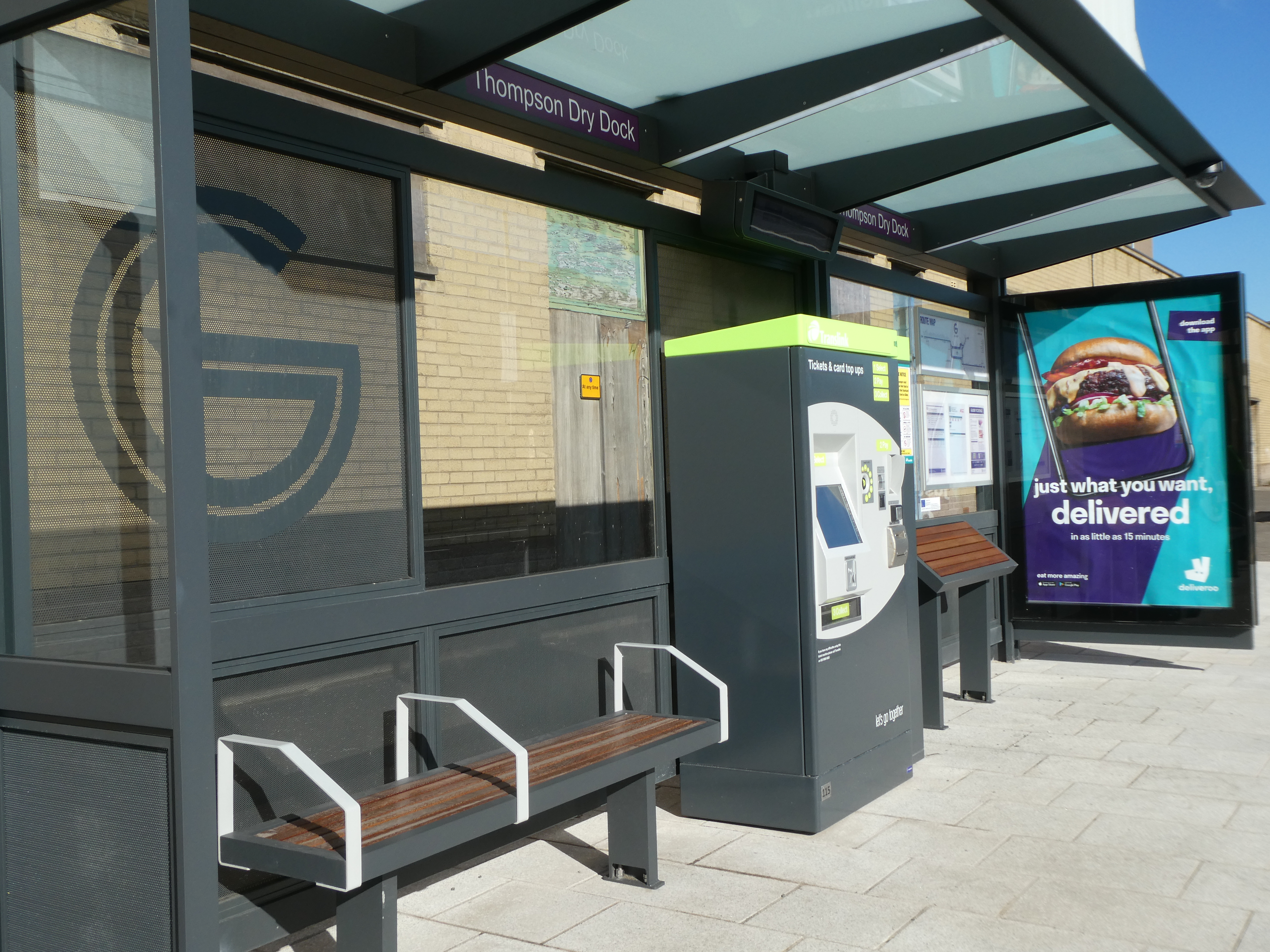
A Glider bus stop

Glider is a bus rapid transit system in Belfast, Northern Ireland, designed to improve the efficiency of mass transit in the city by connecting East and West Belfast and the Titanic Quarter via the city centre. The service is operated by Translink.

There are two routes, G1 (West to East Belfast) and G2 (city centre to Titanic Quarter). The busways total 15 1/4 miles (24.5 kilometres) in length using both dedicated bus lanes and mixed traffic lanes. Costing approximately £100M of public funds, construction started in 2014, and opened in late 2018. It uses a fleet of 18-metre-long Van Hool ExquiCity articulated buses. Weekday services run from 05:00 to 23:00 (other times at weekends and public holidays), operating on a 7–9 minute interval, increasing to 4–6 minutes at peak times.

== Vehicles ==
The vehicles are Van Hool ExquiCity 18 articulated buses of a so-called light tram design with three doors and approximately 18 metres (59 ft) in length. The interior is a mixture of seating and standing, plus free WiFi, USB sockets, real-time visual and audible information and CCTV. The diesel hybrid electrical engines emit a low level of pollution and noise, complying with environmental concerns. In October 2017 the Glider vehicle was unveiled at the Busworld Europe exhibition in Belgium.

== Halts and interchanges ==
Halts along each route are approximately 400 metres apart compared to previous bus stops which were 150–250 metres apart. Halts, which are covered and have some seating and ticket machines, are 18 metres as standard but may be extended to 30 metres to allow simultaneous docking of Glider, Metro and Ulsterbus vehicles. Each halt has Kassel kerbs that allow Glider vehicles to align with the footpath to ensure quick and safe boarding and alighting. Glider vehicles on the G1 route operate between Dundonald interchange on Dunlady Road, which operates as a park and ride facility facilitating up to 519 vehicles, and runs through the city centre continuing to the West Belfast terminus at McKinstry Roundabout on Stewartstown Road. The G2 route operates from Titanic Quarter to the city centre.

== Bus lanes ==
Bus lanes along Glider routes operate from 07:00 to 19:00 on Monday to Saturday. The Department for Infrastructure introduced the lanes in advance of Glider services commencing. 12 hour bus lanes were introduced on 23 July 2018 in west Belfast, 30 July in East Belfast and on 6 August in the Titanic Quarter. City bound bus lanes were suspended in Titanic Quarter on 21 August following severe congestion.

The road width on the bus routes, which incorporate bus lanes and mixed traffic lanes, is designed with a minimum width of 12 metres, with each individual runway a minimum 3 metres wide. As well as the Glider vehicles, any other buses which can carry more than 8 passengers, motorcycles, bicycles, black taxis and wheelchair-accessible private hire taxis are allowed in the bus lanes during their hours of operation.

== Routes ==
The routes were rebranded for launch on 3 September 2018. The G1 service combining the planned EWAY and WWAY routes with vehicles running between McKinstry roundabout and Dundonald via the city centre. The G2 service covers the CITI route between Titanic Quarter and city centre.

=== G1 ===
Glider G1 services link the Stewartstown Road, Andersonstown Road, Falls Road and Divis Street in the west and Albertbridge Road and Upper Newtownards Road in the east of the city passing through the city centre. It passes the Waterfront Hall and St George's Market located in Oxford Street. Lanyon Place Train Station in East Bridge Street connects Belfast with Dublin and is where the Enterprise train departs from. The Europa bus and rail centre Buscentre in Glengall Street also connects Belfast with Dublin by bus as well as the George Best Belfast City Airport and Belfast International Airport. Lanyon Place Station connects with the Ulster Way walking tour route. Ballyhackamore has a number of shops and dining places, and at Stormont tourists can visit the woodlands of Stormont Estate and also Northern Ireland’s main Government buildings. The Comber Greenway, a section of the National Cycle Network in development along the old Belfast-Comber railway, is available to walkers and joggers. In the west of the city terminates at McKinstry Road Roundabout near Dairy Farm. The route passes some of the West Belfast murals, which depict a part of the history and culture of Northern Ireland, and is also close to the Belfast Peace Wall, an interface between the Shankill Road and Falls Road. Historical tours are available at Milltown Cemetery and Belfast City Cemetery, and the route also connects to scenic Forest Park and Falls Park.

=== G2 ===
Glider G2 services link the city centre to Titanic Quarter. It operates as a continual loop passing Belfast City Hall, and allowing travel between the Odyssey, Titanic Building and surrounding areas. Stops are located at St George's Market (May Street), City Hall (May Street), Wellington Place, Chichester Street, Custom House Square, Odyssey, Titanic, Thompson Dry Dock and Catalyst Inc. Belfast's main shopping areas are located in Royal Avenue and Donegall Street and there are two large shopping malls in Castle Court and Victoria Square. Bars, restaurants, cafés and places to stay are found in and around the City Centre, including the Cathedral Quarter and Golden Mile.

== History ==
Public transport in Belfast began with the introduction of trams in 1905, which were superseded by trolleybuses in 1938; both were operated by the Belfast Corporation Tramways. The 1967 Transport Act created a public corporation, the Northern Ireland Transport Holding Company, to oversee public transport. A Regional Development Strategy document was created, leading to the more specific Regional Transport Strategy and the Belfast Metropolitan Transport Plan. To further this plan, the "Belfast Rapid Transit" project was undertaken, overseen by the Department for Regional Development, as an extension of the public transport system in Northern Ireland, which in 2016 operates under the name Translink, a collaboration of three companies Citybus (Metro), Ulsterbus and NI Railways.

In 2014 construction began on the transit system, and by 2015 several sections were partially built.

In December 2015, the Northern Ireland Executive confirmed that the project would go ahead as planned. In 2016, the government continued to give progress updates and detailed information about routes and vehicles.

The Upper Newtownards road bus lane was under construction in 2015 and was expected to be in operation by August, with fines given out to motorists who drove in the lane. However, in June 2016 announcements were still being made of the impending opening of this section.

Several more sections were completed in 2016, and work on the West Belfast transit hub began in 2017.

The opening of the system was delayed because of budget restrictions. Trial services carrying paying passengers commenced on 28 August 2018 and full service began on 3 September 2018.

=== Belfast Rapid Transit ===
The planned Belfast Rapid Transit network was a set of three rapid transit routes planned for the city, including: EWAY as the eastern arm, with WWAY as the western arm, running 6 mi (10 km) to Dunmurry in County Antrim, a short northeastern arm, the 1 3/4 mi (3 km) CITI route to the Catalyst Inc via the Titanic Quarter, and a shared 2 mi (3 km) city centre loop to link all three routes. If the rapid transit network had been completed its total length would have been about 15 1/4 mi (24.5 km).

==== EWAY ====
EWAY was a proposed bus rapid transit route to be built to link Dundonald in County Down with Belfast City Centre. It was to be about 5.5 miles (9 km) long.

In January 2007 David Cairns MP, then Regional Development Minister of Northern Ireland, announced that engineering consultants WS Atkins PLC were to undertake economic feasibility studies on rapid transit proposals for Belfast, including assessing the Belfast Metropolitan Transport Plan (BMTP) proposals for the EWAY rapid transit scheme which would run between Dundonald and Belfast city centre. A report was expected around mid-2007. Both the Regional Transportation Strategy (RTS) for Northern Ireland and the BMTP recognised the value of introducing rapid transit services in Belfast.

Originally much of the EWAY was to be routed along the trackbed of what had been the main line of the Belfast and County Down Railway (BCDR) between the site of Ballymacarrett Junction in East Belfast and the former Dundonald railway station in County Down. In 2003–2004 the Knock Valley Relief Sewer was laid along 7.5 km (4 3/4 mi) of the former BCDR trackbed, flowing from Dundonald to Ballymacarrett. The sewer is aligned so as not to jeopardise EWAY's then-proposed use of the trackbed.

However, the trackbed had already been re-used to create the Comber Greenway pedestrian and cycle route. A campaign group called "Greenway to Stay" was formed to lobby for EWAY to be re-routed along Upper Newtownards Road. In October 2011 it was announced that EWAY would not include the Comber Greenway in its route.

At first both light rail and bus rapid transit were considered as options. Light rail was eliminated on cost grounds, and the entire Belfast Rapid Transit project has now been replaced by the Glider bus rapid transit.

==== CITI Belfast ====
The CITI was a proposed light-rail route that would have served the Titanic Quarter and George Best Belfast City Airport. A report revealed that there were not enough people in the city to justify the project, instead recommending the use of a bus network to save costs. The Glider bus rapid transit system began operating in 2018. It would have been part of a wider network, including the EWAY and WWAY routes.

== Future ==
On 26 July 2021, the Department for Infrastructure opened public consultation on "Belfast Rapid Transit Phase 2", an expansion of the Glider network. Plans were unveiled for an extension of G2; and two entirely new lines: one to the south and one to the north. These two lines may be combined into a single service, much like G1.

=== G2 Extension ===
A southern extension of G2 into the Queen's Quarter, providing access to Queen's University, Belfast and Belfast City Hospital. G2 currently traverses the city centre in a one-way system, which would be expanded, with services continuing clockwise along Dublin Road and University Road, before turning across Elmwood Avenue and onto the Lisburn Road. The two directions would briefly reunite at Shaftesbury Square, before northbound services continue on Great Victoria Street and rejoin the existing route.

=== South ===
A new route through South Belfast to Cairnshill park and ride. This route would mainly use the Ormeau Road, largely taking over Metro corridor 7. Rather than Botanic Avenue, the route would access the city centre by continuing through lower Ormeau, and crossing onto Great Victoria Street via the Bankmore Link, a newly-built bus-only road.

The Ormeau Road has four lanes for its entire length, and the South Glider route would involve 2 dedicated bus lanes along the majority of the road. The proposal also involves upgrading the existing park-and-ride facility at Cairnshill.

=== North ===
A route through North Belfast to a new Park-and-Ride facility, providing access to Belfast Castle and Belfast Zoo. Two options are being considered for the Route:

- Antrim Road. This option travels along a road which already has bus lanes for most of its length. These would be improved, and their hours of operation increased. It would also see the busy junction at Carlisle Circus converted from a roundabout to a signalised crossroads.
- Shore Road. This option would involve two short one-way sections, and utilise dedicated bus lanes along the majority of the road. Some highway widening is proposed to facilitate this.

== See also ==
- Park and ride bus services in the United Kingdom
