= Trolleybuses in Wolverhampton =

Wolverhampton trolleybus system
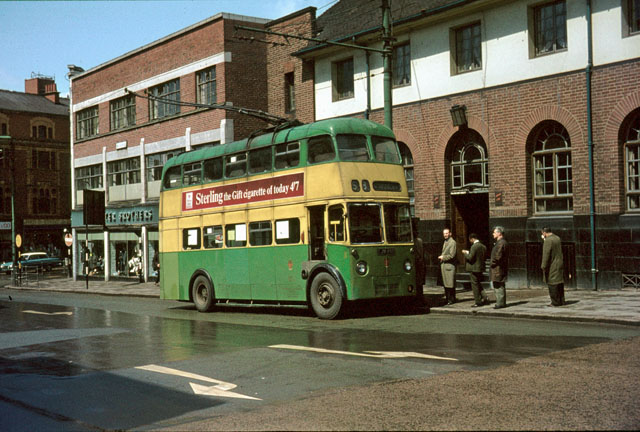
- A trolleybus in Bilston Street, Wolverhampton

Operation
- Locale: Wolverhampton, Staffordshire, England
- Open: 1923
- Close: 1967
- Status: Closed
- Routes: 14

Infrastructure
- Electrification: (?) V DC parallel overhead lines

The Wolverhampton trolleybus system served the town of Wolverhampton, then in Staffordshire, England (and now a city in the West Midlands), for much of the twentieth century.

Opened on 29 October 1923, the system was one of the most extensive trolleybus systems in the United Kingdom, with a total of 14 routes, and a maximum fleet of 173 trolleybuses. For a brief period in the 1930s, it even had the distinction of being the world's largest trolleybus system. It was closed on 5 March 1967.

== History ==
Prior to 1923, Wolverhampton had run a tramway system and a number of motorbuses. Included in the motorbus fleet were a small number of petrol-electric vehicles, manufactured by Tilling-Stevens of Maidstone. The General Manager of the municipal transport section was Charles Owen Silvers, and he was sufficiently impressed by the performance of the vehicles that he pressed for a system where the petrol engines were replaced by overhead wires. The short, single-track tramway route from Princes Square to Rookery Bridge in Wednesfield was in need of reconstruction, and in April 1923 the town council approved the conversion of the route to their first trolleybus line. Although the Corporation had no powers to run trolleybuses, the Ministry of Transport allowed the scheme to be implemented, providing a clause to permit such operation was included in their next Parliamentary Bill. Rookery Bridge was widened and the route was extended from the original 1.75 miles (2.82 km) to 2.25 miles (3.62 km), terminating at Pinfold Bridge. Tramcars over the route were withdrawn, to be replaced by motor buses while the conversion work took place. The route was hampered by a low railway bridge, and so six single-deck vehicles were obtained from Tilling-Stevens, which were fitted with Dodson centre-entrance bodies. A formal opening ceremony for the service was held on 29 October 1923.

The corporation next turned their attention to the single-track tramway route from Waterloo Road to Bushbury, which was to be extended by about 1 mile (1.6 km) along Stafford Road. The extension would serve a developing area, but since part of the tramway and all of the extension were outside of the Corporation's area of responsibility, agreement had to be reached with Staffordshire County Council. Trams on the route were withdrawn in August 1924, with motor buses being used while the conversion took place. 3 miles (4.8 km) of new trolleybus route were opened on 9 March 1925, and again, single-deck vehicles from Tilling-Stevens were used. The tramway had used double-deck trams, but there was an arched bridge on the route, with the tram tracks placed centrally in the road. Because trolleybuses were not constrained by tracks, double-deck vehicles would have collided with the bridge if they did not use the centre of the road. At the opening ceremony for the new route, the chairman of the Tramways Committee was able to report that the fortunes of the Wednesfield line had been turned around, and it was now a profitable route, whereas the tramway had made a loss.

The corporation rectified their lack of formal operating powers for the trolleybuses when they obtained the Wolverhampton Corporation Act 1925, which gave them powers to build and run trolleybus routes within the borough and outside it, as well as giving them powers to take over tram routes which were operated by the Wolverhampton District Electric Tramways Company. The tram routes served Dudley, Bilston and Willenhall, and the intention was to replace the trams with trolleybuses. The conversion work took place in stages, with the first part from Snow Hill to the Fighting Cocks public house on the borough boundary opening on 26 October 1925. This was extended to Sedgley Bull Ring on 10 November 1925, and then to Sedgley Depot on 11 May 1927. Shortly afterwards, the changeover was complete, when the service reached Dudley on 8 July 1927. The initial vehicle, which carried civic officials from Coseley, Dudley, Sedgley, Willenhall and Wolverhampton, was one of a batch of 3-axle double-deck trolleybuses manufactured by Guy Motors of Wolverhampton. They had produced their first such vehicle in 1926, which had 61 seats and a covered top but an open staircase at the rear. Wolverhampton ordered a further 58 similar vehicles from Guy Motors over the next five years, although they all had an enclosed rear staircase.

Expansion of the network continued through 1927, with trolleybuses reaching Neachells Lane, Willenhall on 15 May. This route was extended to Willenhall Market Place on 16 September, as there were plans for through running onto the Walsall system. A route to Penn Fields opened on 11 July, and another to Tettenhall on 29 October. The last trams ran in August 1928, which allowed the route to Bilston to be opened on 19 November 1928, and this was extended on 28 May 1929 to reach Darlaston. It was at this point that the system became the largest in the world, with around 25 miles (40 km) of route, and the service being used by 36 million passengers a year. The tramcar route to Bradley was to have been converted, but motor buses replaced the trams instead. In 1930 a circular service to Whitmore Reans began operating, which included a branch specifically to serve the Courtauld's textile works. A new departure was the route from Willenhall to Fighting Cocks, which did not involve the trolleybuses starting at the town centre. In late 1931, through working with the Walsall system began, when the Willenhall line was extended, enabling Walsall trolleybuses to reach Wolverhampton and Wolverhampton trolleybuses to reach Walsall. The joint working began on 16 November 1931, after a low bridge on the Willenhall route was modified to allow the running of double-deck vehicles.

The Corporation were now opening routes well beyond the confines of the old tramway system. Trolleybuses ran to Bushbury Hill from 30 November 1931, and to a number of developing residential areas subsequently. The Amos Lane and Pear Tree routes opened on 21 March 1932, and on 10 April 1933 a service began serving Brickkiln Street, Jeffcock Road and Bradmore. The Penn Fields route had been extended to Penn on 10 October 1932, and a second route to Penn opened on 8 April 1935. The Wednesfield route was extended to Lichfield Road on 10 February 1934, and trolleybuses replaced motor buses on Oxbarn Avenue the following day. By 1936 there were 90 double-deck and 18 single-deck vehicles in operation. Single-deck vehicles were used on the Fordhouses route until 1938, but those on the Wednesfield route continued until 1943, when the roadway beneath a railway bridge was lowered, allowing double-deck vehicles to be used throughout. The single-deck vehicles were then sold.

The situation during and immediately after the Second World War appears a little confused. Joyce et al. state that 38 extra vehicles were obtained to meet wartime traffic levels. Lockwood states that wartime needs were met by borrowing 12 Sunbeams from Bournemouth, and the purchase of 38 Sunbeams with utility bodywork between 1943 and 1946. The fleet list published in Joyce et al. shows 18 Sunbeams entering service between 1940 and 1942, and 38 Sunbeams with utility bodywork arriving between 1943 and 1946, so the earlier reference to 38 vehicles appears to cover the utility vehicles, some of which did not enter service until the war was over. Between the end of the war and 1950, a further 50 Guys and 71 Sunbeams were obtained, enabling the replacement of many of the older vehicles in the fleet. Some of the earlier 2-axle Sunbeams were sold to Southend in 1950, with a further batch going to Belfast in 1952.

=== Demise ===
Wolverhampton Corporation began a process of fitting new bodies to the utility vehicles in 1952, when 16 vehicles were refurbished by Park Royal Vehicles. Charles H. Roe of Leeds built new bodies for a further 16 in 1958/59, and a final batch of 22 were rebodied in 1961/62. Although the future of the trolleybus system was considered in 1957, no action was taken at the time. On 22 January 1961, motor buses replaced the trolleybuses on the Penn Road routes, because major roadworks were under way at the in-town end of the service, and although some of the routes were reinstated on 21 May, that along Oxbarn Avenue was not, with motor buses continuing in service. In 1961 there were some 150 vehicles operational, but the Transport Committee decided that the trolleybuses should be withdrawn, and the routes were progressively closed. Those to Penn and Penn Fields were the first to go, on 9 June 1963, followed by the Tettenhall route on 30 June. Major closures took place on 3 November, when services to Finchfield and Low Hill, Merry Hill and Low Hill, Amos Lane and Jeffcock Road, and Wednesfield were all withdrawn.

Next to go was the Fordhouses to Bushbury Hill service, on 26 January 1964, and on 26 October, the route from Willenhall to Bilston and Fighting Cocks ceased to operate. This was partly as a result of the rebuilding of a railway bridge at Willenhall. More closures followed in 1965, with services from Whitmore Reans to Bilston and Darlaston ending on 8 August, while the Willenhall service and the jointly-worked route between Walsall and Wolverhampton ceased on 31 October. Since Walsall had been extending their routes fairly recently, there were hopes that the joint service would last somewhat longer, but it was not to be. This left just the Dudley route, which continued until it closed without ceremony on 5 March 1967. The final working was by Sunbeam No. 446.

=== Depots ===
Initially, the trolleybuses were stabled in depots which were formerly used for tramcars. The main depot was on Cleveland Road, at the centre of the system, but it was not an ideal location, as it had no yard, and trolleybuses generally reversed out straight onto a main road. Following the acquisition of the Wolverhampton District Electric Tramways Company, two of their depots were used for the trolleybuses, one at Sedgley and the other at Bilston. On 6 October 1938 a new depot providing stabling for 56 trolleybuses was opened on Park Lane, Fallings Park, on the opposite side of the road to the Guy Motors works. From the Cleveland Road depot there were tracks to the Snow Hill terminus, for the route to Fighting Cocks, Sedgley and Dudley, and to the route out to Bilston, which provided access to all of the routes that radiated out from central Wolverhampton. These tracks were only used for vehicle movements, and there were no public services over them.

== Preservation ==
Four Wolverhampton trolleybuses are known to have survived. No. 433, a Sunbeam W4 supplied with BTH electrical equipment and Park Royal utility bodywork in 1946, was one of the batch rebodied in 1958/59 by Roe. It remained in service until the system closed, and now operates at the Black Country Living Museum in Dudley. They also have No. 78, an early Guy BTX 3-axle vehicle. This was supplied in 1931 with Rees-Stevens electrical equipment, and was one of the first batch where Guy also built the bodywork, rather than Dodson building it. It was awaiting restoration in 2020.

No. 616 was one of the final batch of Sunbeam F4 trolleybuses and was bought in 1949. It came with BTH electrical equipment, and bodywork by Park Royal, which was 8 feet (2.4 m) wide, following a change in legislation. It was withdrawn from service in 1963 or 1965, and was given to the Railway Preservation Society, then based at Hednesford, but was stored at Alton in Hampshire. In order to safeguard it, they donated it to the predecessor of The Transport Museum, Wythall, who in turn stored it in the north west of England until 2004, when it was moved to Wythall. Some bodywork repairs were carried out in 2006, and it was repainted in 2007. It is now on static display at the museum.

The final vehicle is No. 654, the last vehicle numerically in the fleet at Wolverhampton, and one of the final batch of Guy BT vehicles, with BTH electrical equipment and Park Royal bodywork. It was withdrawn in 1965, and given to the National Trolleybus Association (NTA). It returned to the system for tours on the final day of operation, and then moved to a Ministry of Defence site, where it was severely vandalised in 1968. It was then moved to more secure storage in Ashton, Northamptonshire, and although the bodywork is in poor condition, it is structurally sound. The NTA is intending to return it to operational condition, once they have completed restoration of Belfast No. 168, which should be in late 2020 or early 2021. It was listed as preserved at Ashton, Northamptonshire in 2017.

Trolleybus No. 274 existed until at least 2014 as part of a cottage at Coven. It was built in 1938, but was withdrawn from service in 1949, after it was involved in an accident. Mr S B Church, who lived near the Park Lane depot, bought it and took it to Coven, where it became a summer house. In 1968 the top deck was removed, and the lower deck was incorporated into a bungalow. The bungalow was auctioned in May 2014, but information on the subsequent fate of the lower deck has not been published.

== See also ==
- Transport in Wolverhampton
- Black Country Living Museum
- List of trolleybus systems in the United Kingdom

== Bibliography ==
- Joyce, J; King, J S; Newman, A G (1986). British Trolleybus Systems. London: Ian Allan Publishing. ISBN 978-0-7110-1647-7.
- Lockwood, Stephen (2011). Trackless to Trolleybus. Adam Gordon. ISBN 978-1-874422-86-0.
- Short, Peter (2012). "Former UK systems". British Trolleybus Society.
- Sidwell, Graham (2006). Wolverhampton Trolleybuses 1961–67. Middleton Press. ISBN 978-1-904474-85-2.
