= Metro (Belfast) =

Trading name for Citybus in Belfast, Northern Ireland

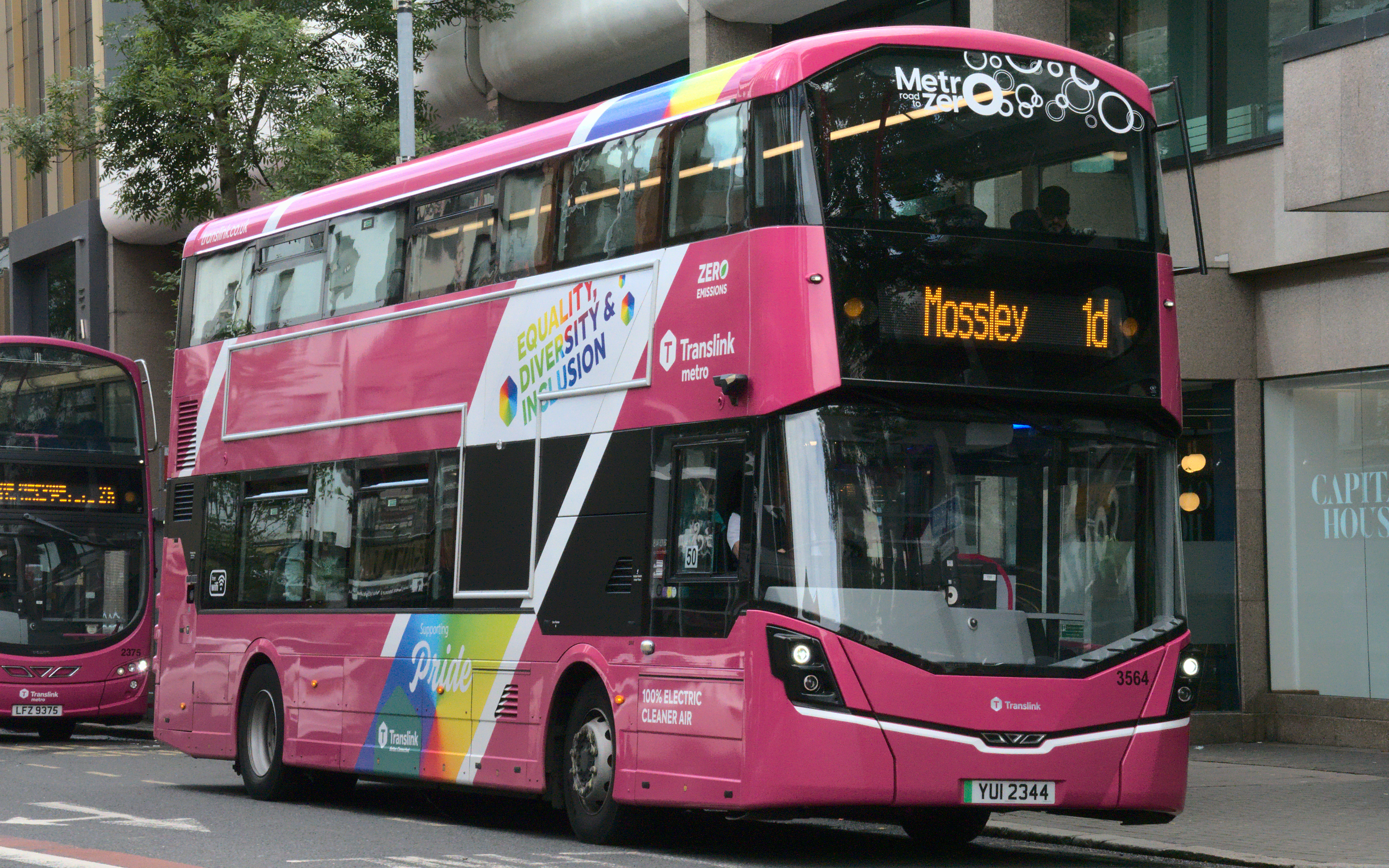
- Wright StreetDeck Electroliner battery electric bus on Upper Queen Street in Belfast in July 2023
- Parent: Translink
- Founded: 1973 (as Citybus); 2005 (as Metro)
- Service area: Belfast
- Service type: bus service, bus rapid transit
- Fleet: 300 as of July 2024
- Website: Translink/Metro

Metro is the trading name for bus company Citybus in Belfast, Northern Ireland. It is a subsidiary of the Northern Ireland Transport Holding Company, within the common management structure of Translink, along with Ulsterbus and Northern Ireland Railways.

== History ==
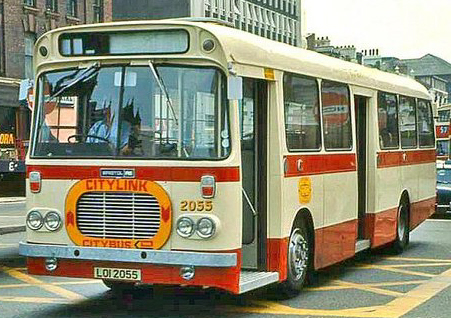
A Citybus Bristol RE branded for the Citylink service on Great Victoria Street in 1976

Bus services began in Belfast under the Belfast Corporation Transport Department. For a time in the early 1950s, these buses ran alongside both the tram and trolleybus networks run by the corporation until these networks were eventually abandoned, and like most mainland operators, Belfast Corporation ran a mixture of single deck and double-decker buses. The Northern Ireland Transport Holding Company acquired the operations of the Transport Department in 1970, and in 1973, the Transport Department was renamed to Belfast Citybus and was integrated with fellow NITHC company Ulsterbus, with both companies being managed by Werner Heubeck.

Citybus drivers and their buses were often caught in the crossfire of rioting and paramilitary action during The Troubles. Buses were often hijacked and used as burning barricades, and drivers were assaulted or robbed, while a total of 17 Ulsterbus and Citybus employees were killed over the course of The Troubles. 1,484 buses from both fleets were maliciously destroyed from 1964 to the signing of the Good Friday Agreement in 1998, with second-hand vehicles occasionally acquired from British operators.

Bus services in and around Belfast often ran in competition with black cab taxis throughout the 1970s and 1980s. These offered lower fares and provided individual services for Belfast's Protestant and Catholic communities at times when bus services were forced off the road by disorder and paramilitary action.

The Northern Ireland Transport Holding Company was rebranded to Translink in 1996. The Citybus name was initially retained through this rebranding process, however in 2004, it was announced that Citybus would be rebranded to 'Metro' in a network shake-up. The Metro network was launched on 7 February 2005. Buses were painted in a pink and white livery, in contrast to the blue and white livery of Ulsterbus, and the improved network of services was based on twelve quality bus corridors (QBCs) around Greater Belfast, promising a five to ten minute bus frequency. Over 540 complaints were made to Translink following the launch of Metro, largely due to buses arriving later than timetabled, however the launch was hailed as a success by Translink, citing a 6.3% increase in passenger numbers.

== Services ==
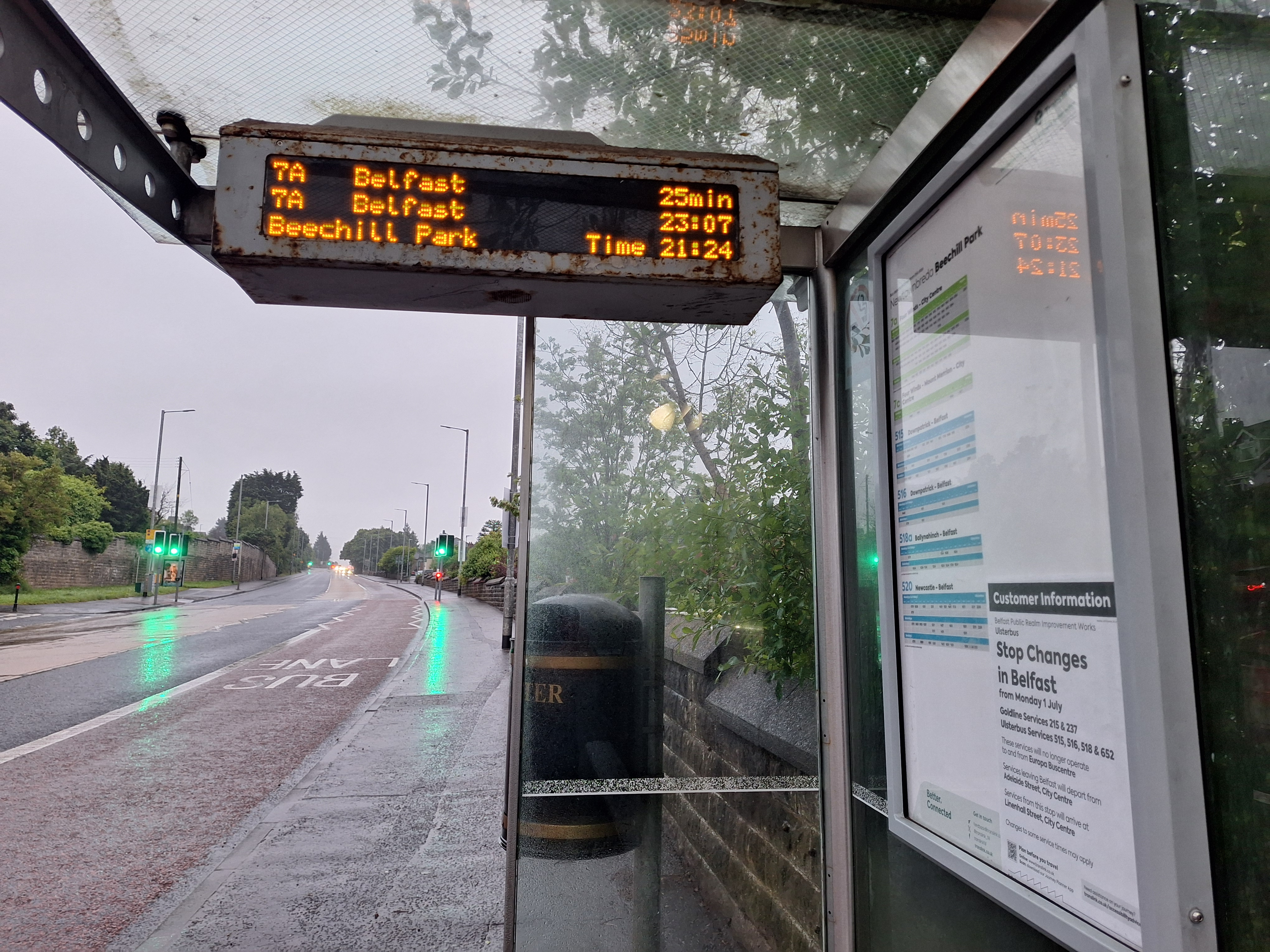
A Translink Metro Bus stop

Metro operates 12 quality bus corridors (QBCs) in Belfast and a number of additional routes. It also operates 5 bus stations situated in the city. On some routes the buses extend beyond Belfast into neighbouring towns, notably Newtownabbey and Dundonald, as well as outlying housing estates such as Poleglass, Twinbrook and Lagmore that used to fall within the Lisburn City Council but now falls under the Belfast City Council area.

== Incidents ==
A Metro double-decker bus, which was operating on route 11b, was hijacked and set alight by sectarian rioters at the junction of Lanark Way and Shankill Road on 7 April 2021 during the 2021 Northern Ireland riots. Rioters attempted to put the £250,000 bus into gear before releasing the handbrake and setting it alight. No passengers on board the bus were injured and the driver was left "unhurt but very badly shaken". Translink employees staged a protest at Belfast City Hall a day later against the rioting, threatening to withdraw bus services in East Belfast between 6pm and the morning.

Another Metro double-decker bus, which was operating on route 2e, was hijacked and set alight in Newtownabbey in County Antrim on 7 November 2021. The incident followed another hijacking and burning of an Ulsterbus double-decker a week prior in Newtownards in County Down. The hijackers claimed themselves to be from the Protestant Action Force, who have claimed the previous Newtownards attack to be part of a campaign against the Northern Ireland Protocol.

== Fleet ==
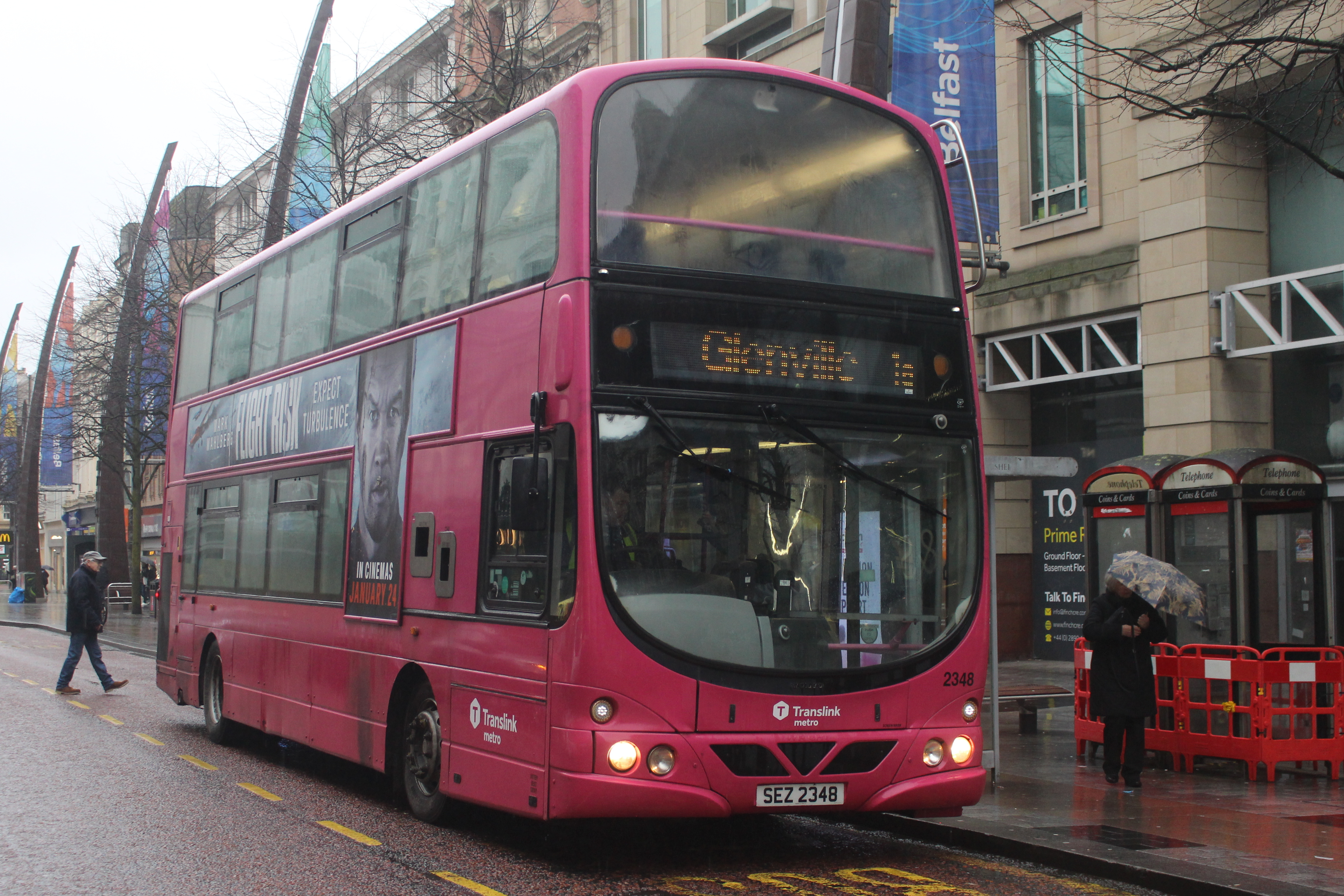
Wright Eclipse Gemini bodied Volvo B9TL at Donegall Square in January 2025

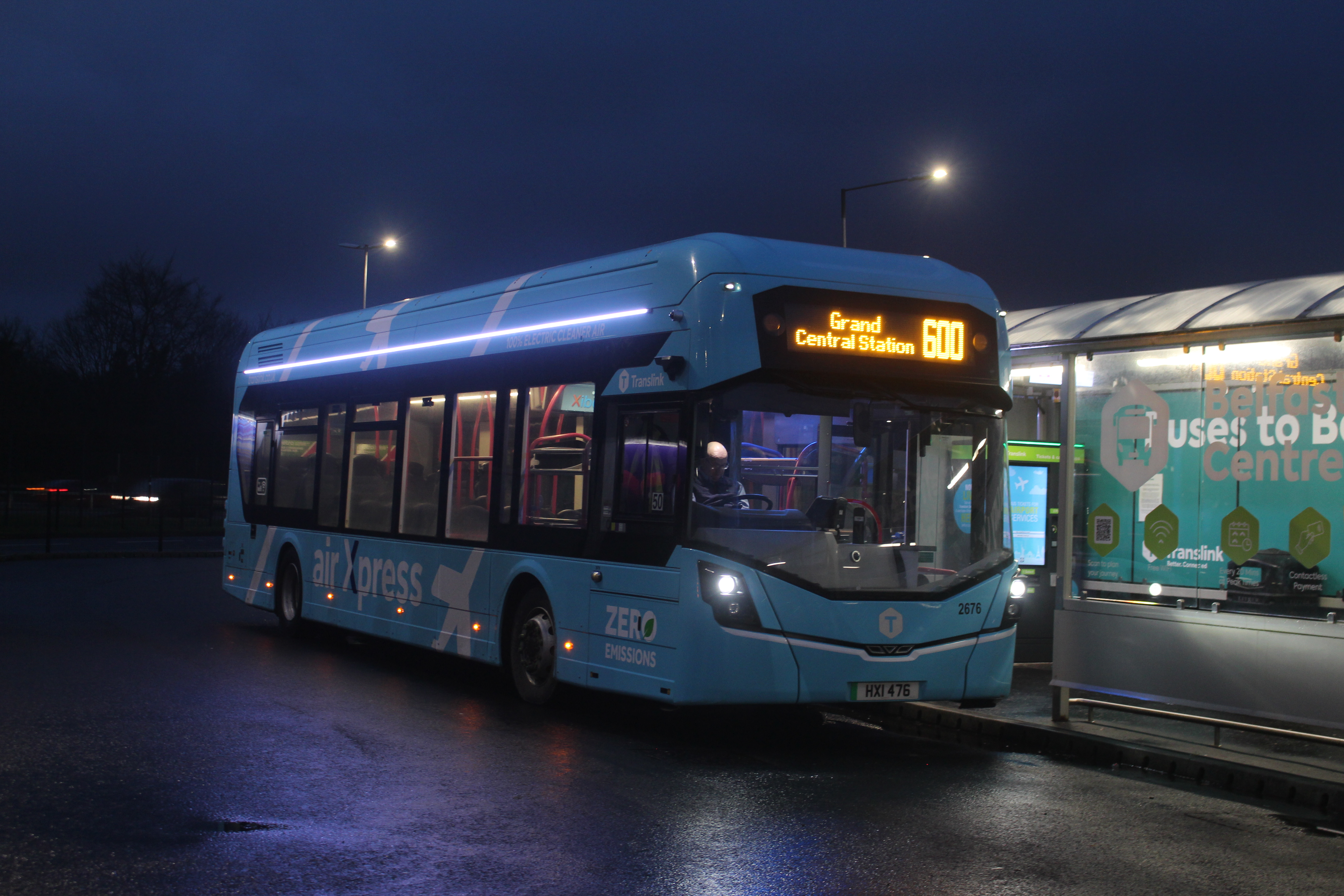
Airport Express branded Wright GB Kite Electroliner at Belfast City Airport in January 2025

As of 2021, Metro operates a fleet of 260 buses from four depots, namely Milewater, Newtownabbey, Falls Road and Short Strand predominantly bodied by Wrightbus of Ballymena. The fleet is also augmented by 34 Van Hool ExquiCity 18 articulated buses for the Glider network. All buses are equipped with audio-visual bus stop announcement systems, featuring dot-matrix displays and audio announcements for the route and upcoming bus stops. Glider vehicles are equipped with LCD displays supplied by Hannover showing upcoming four bus stops.

Like Ulsterbus, the former Citybus standardised on locally assembled Alexander-bodied Bristol REs, Leyland Leopards, Leyland Tigers and Volvo B10Ms before the advent of low-floor buses, many of which were maliciously destroyed in sectarian violence. No further double-decker buses were purchased following Citybus' integration into the NITHC, with high maintenance costs being cited for the move to single deckers. However, in 2001, double decker buses were reintroduced to Belfast through the purchase of 20 low-floor Volvo B7TLs with Alexander ALX400 bodywork for both Citybus and Ulsterbus.

Following the delivery of three Wright StreetDeck Hydroliner fuel cell buses, the first hydrogen buses in Northern Ireland, to Metro in December 2020, the first buses from a later order of 100 zero-emissions Wrightbus buses, including 77 Wright StreetDeck Electroliner battery electric buses and 23 more StreetDeck Hydroliners, began entering service in Belfast from March 2022. 60 more of Wrightbus' Electroliner single and double-decker buses have been ordered for delivery to Metro by summer 2024.

Throughout the first half of 2025, there were an extra 46 electric double decker buses that entered service with Metro.

== See also ==
- List of bus operators of the United Kingdom
- Ulsterbus
- Belfast Rapid Transport
