= Belfast Corporation Tramways =

Northern Ireland tram operator, 1905–1973

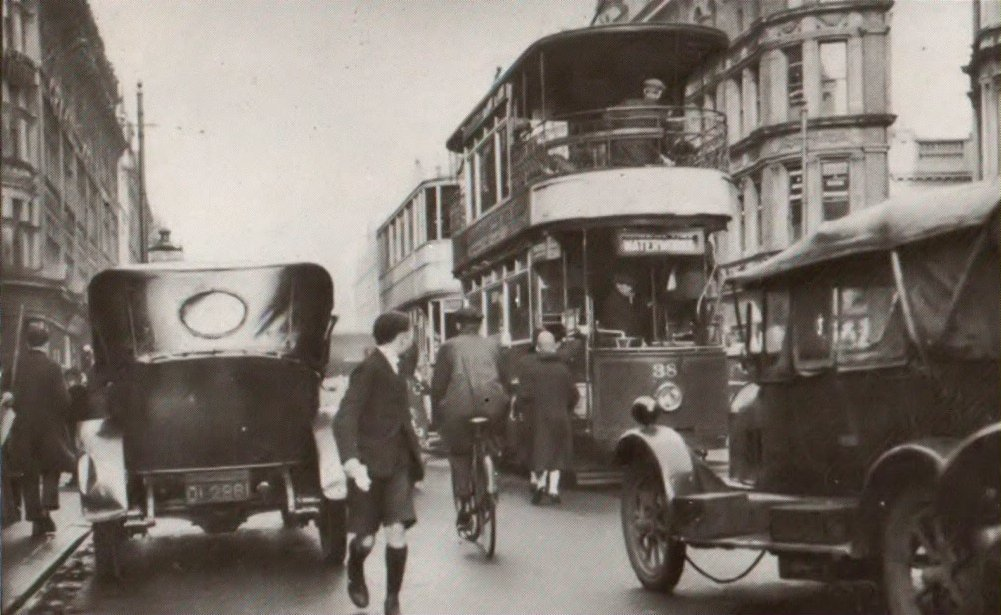
- Royal Avenue, Belfast in the 1920s

Operation
- Locale: Belfast
- Open: 1 January 1905
- Close: 10 February 1954
- Status: Closed

Infrastructure
- Track gauge: 4 ft 9 in (1,448 mm)
- Propulsion system: Electric

Statistics
- Route length: 51.45 miles (82.80 km)

Belfast Corporation Tramways was an operator of tram, trolleybus and bus services in Belfast from 1905 to 1973.

== History ==
Belfast Corporation Tramways began on 1 January 1905 when the Belfast Corporation purchased the tram system from the Belfast Street Tramways Company, which had owned and operated it since the advent of Belfast's first trams in 1872. The trams had been horse-drawn, the corporation electrified them using overhead wires in 1905.

Belfast's electric trams were originally painted red and white. Some older, unmodernised trams retained this livery until the 1950s. In 1928, a new general manager was appointed: William Chamberlain, formerly of Leeds Corporation Tramways. Chamberlain introduced a new livery of dark blue and white which remained the livery for all new trams from this point (This livery was also applied to the new Trolley buses in 1938, but later changed to red livery for these buses from late 1940s). He was also responsible for the modernisation of 50 of the older tramcars and the construction of 50 new vehicles.

Chamberlain was succeeded by Robert McCreary in 1931, who introduced a further fleet of 50 streamlined trams in 1935 – the last trams to be built for Belfast. These trams gained also the nickname "McCreary". Colonel McCreary retired in 1951 and was succeeded by Joseph Mackle.

== Closure ==
Belfast Corporation converted the Falls Road tram service to trolleybuses in 1938. The Corporation regarded this as successful and a decision to eliminate the tram system was made in 1939. Trolleybuses continued to be introduced during the 1940s. The last trams ran in 1954 and, following a policy change, were replaced by diesel buses.

The trolleybuses were themselves replaced by diesel buses in 1968. The Belfast Corporation bus fleet was transferred to Citybus (now Metro) in 1973.

== Preservation ==

Two ex-Belfast Corporation trams survive at the Ulster Folk and Transport Museum.

- 249 4-wheel double deck built 1905
- 357 4-wheel double deck built 1929

An older Belfast tram, of the horse-drawn variety, is also at the Ulster Folk Transport Museum. (No. 118)

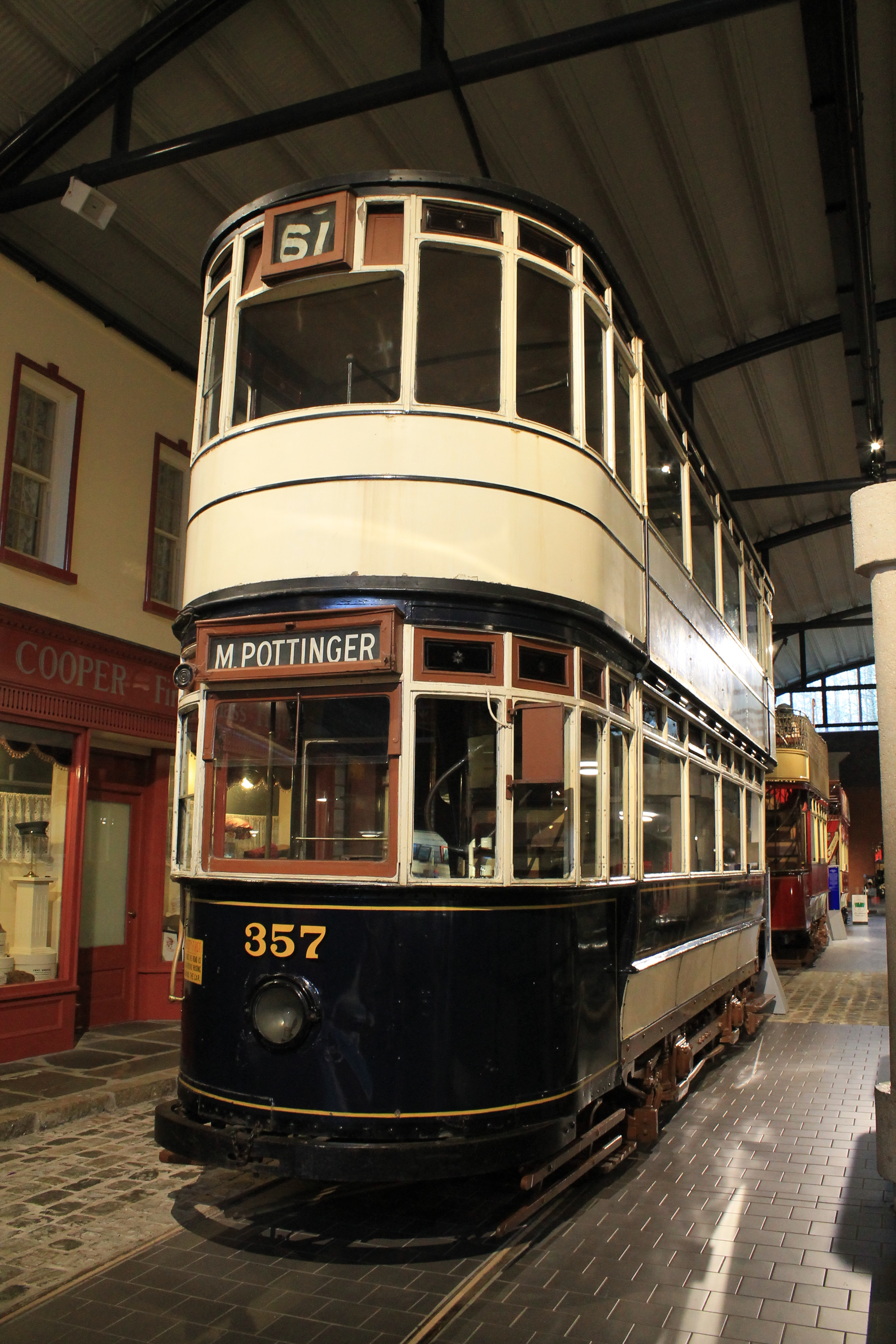
No. 357

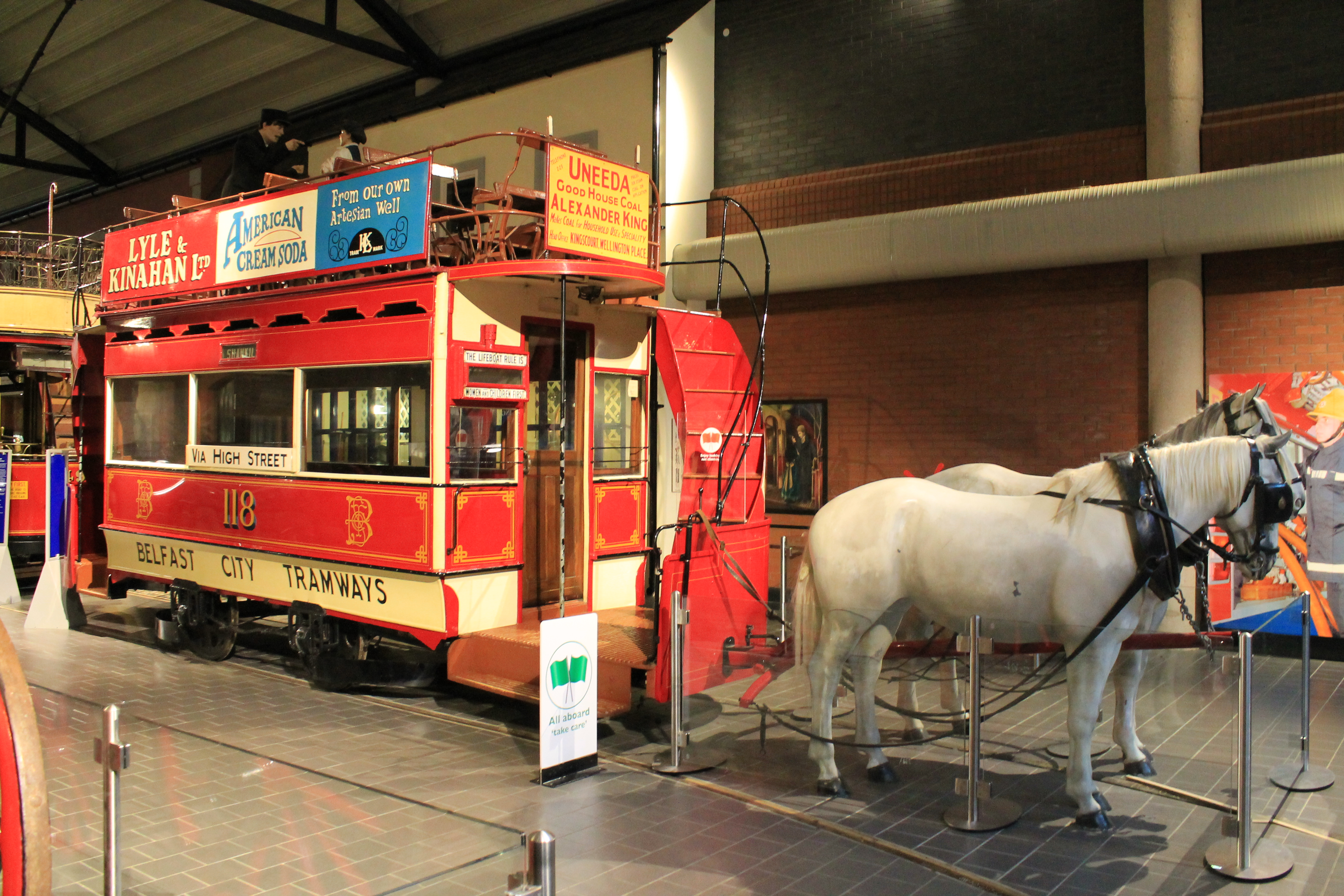
No. 118

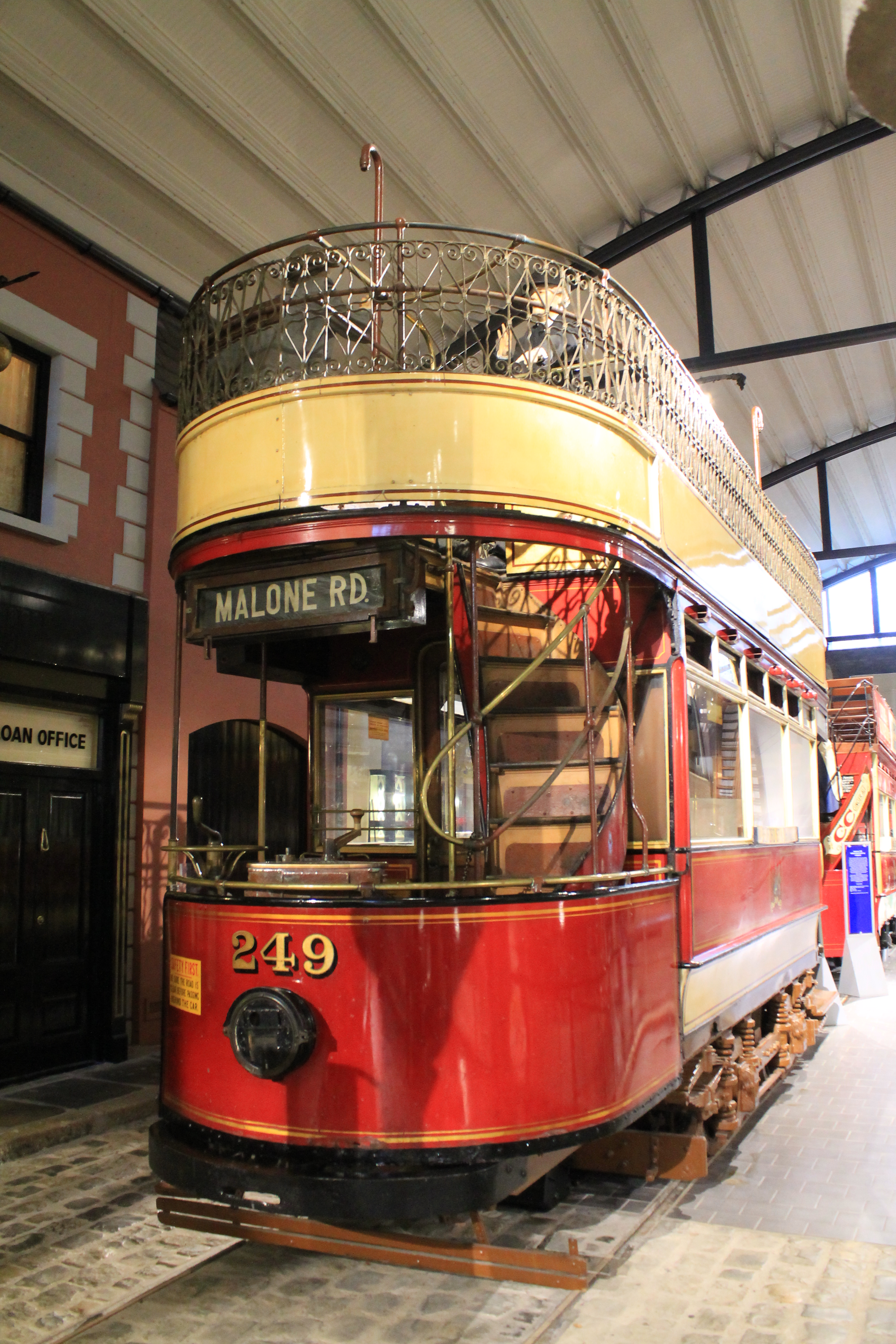
No. 249

== Gallery ==
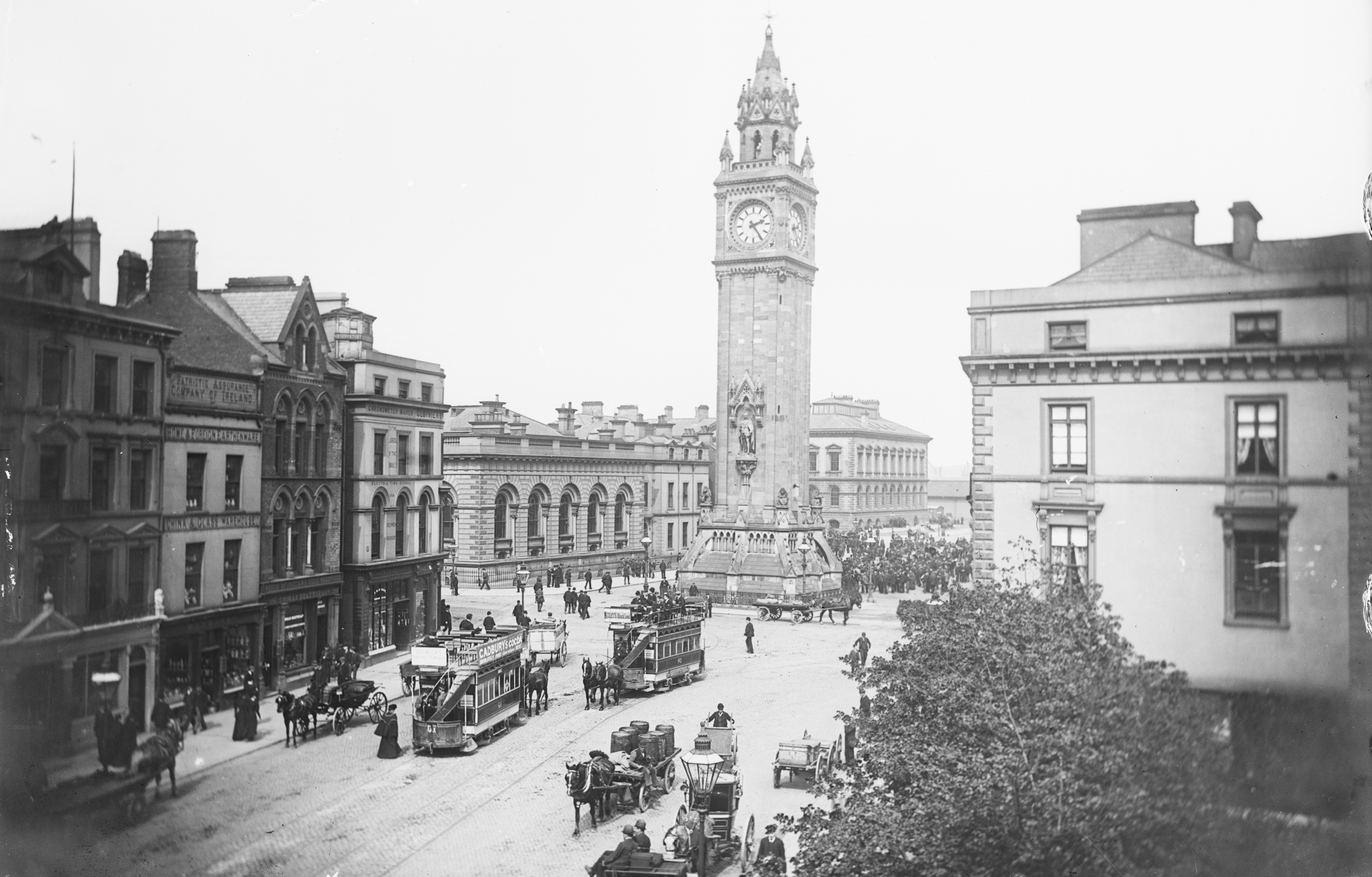
The Albert Clock in 1901 with horse trams.

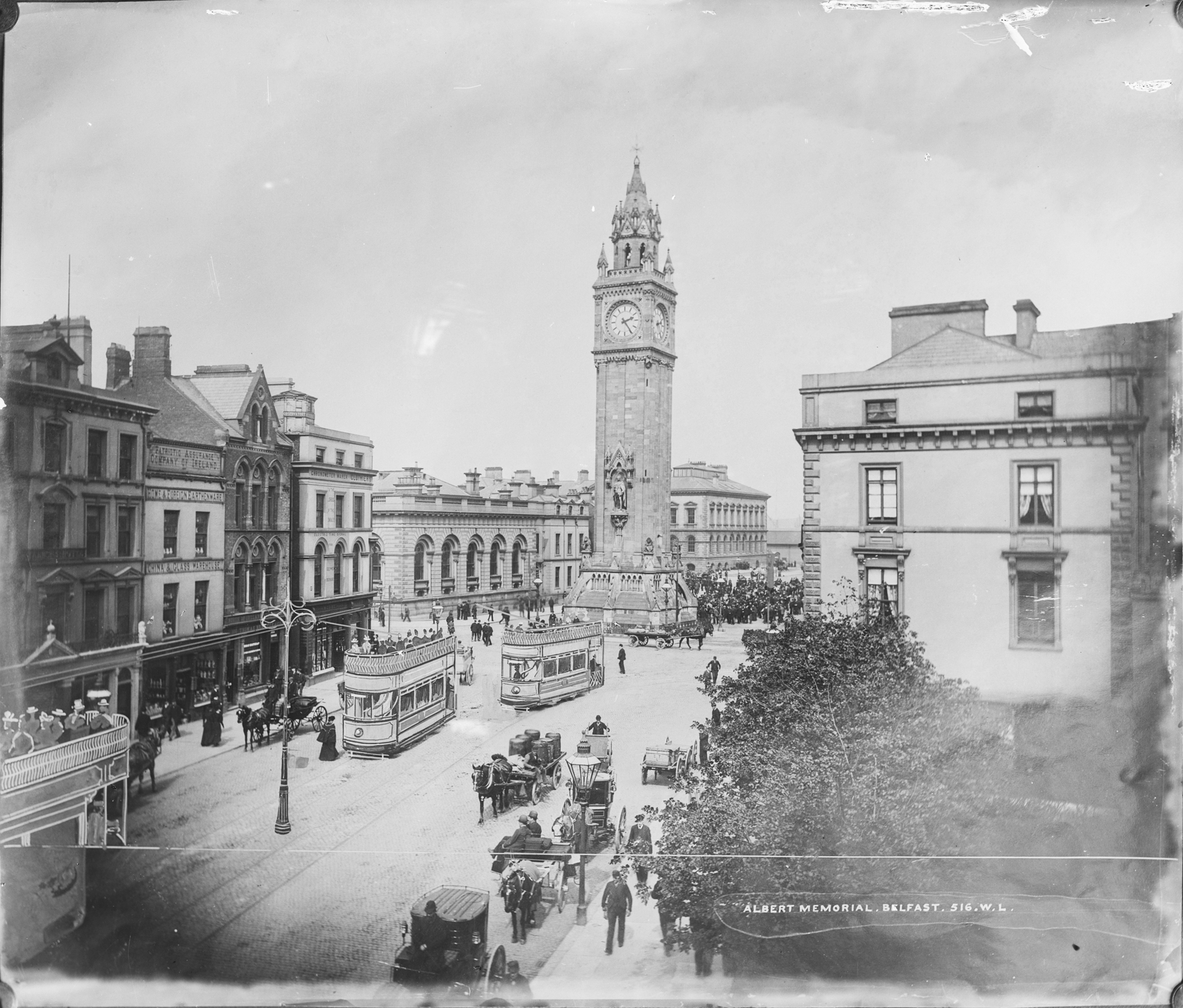
The Albert Clock with electric trams edited onto the previous picture with horse trams.

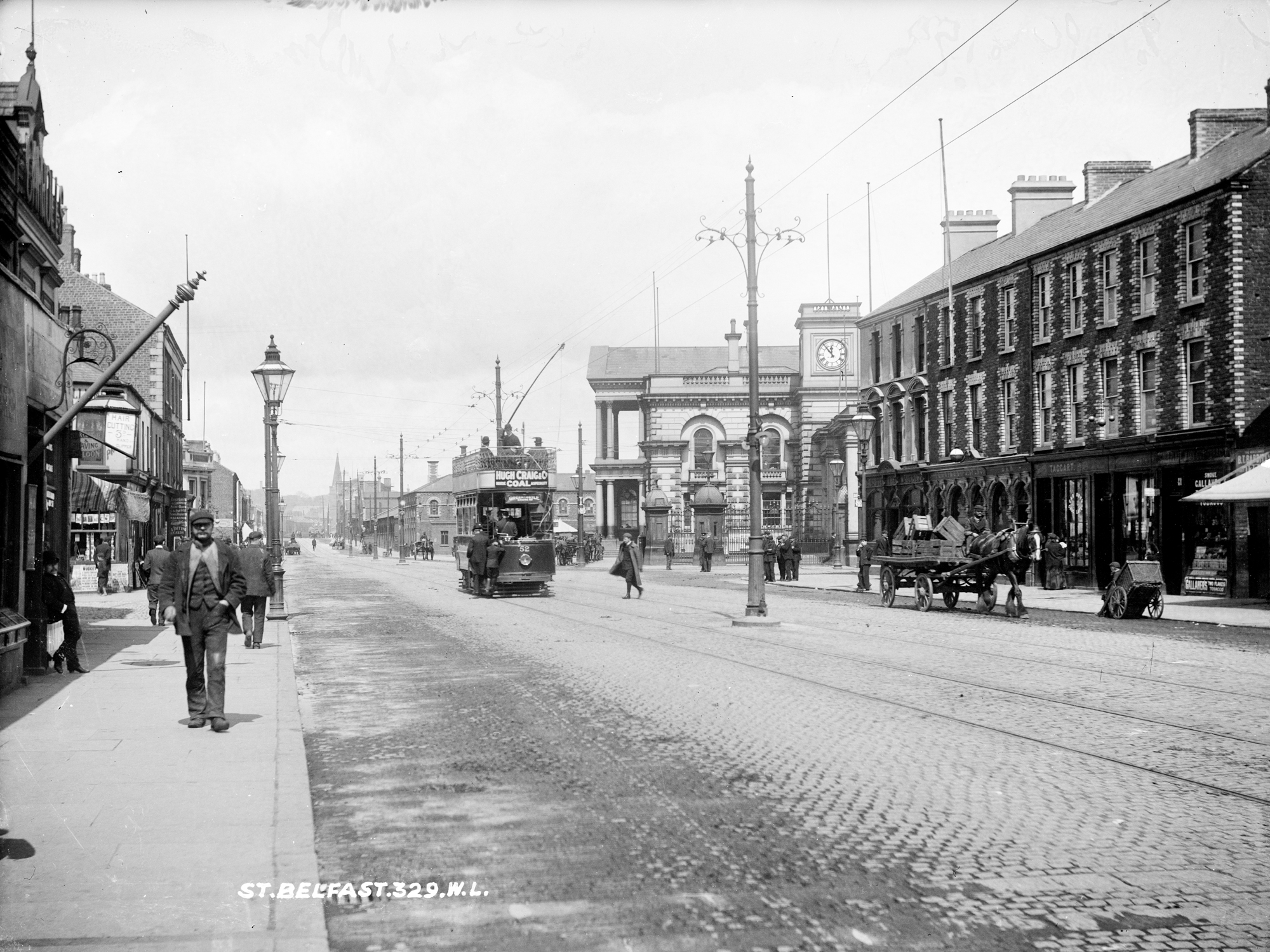
Circa 1907 with an electric tram near the Northern Counties Committee station at York Road railway station.

== See also ==
- Transport in Belfast
- Transport in Ireland
- National Tramway Museum
- Ulster Folk and Transport Museum

== Bibliography ==
- Joyce, J; et al. (1986). British Trolleybus Systems. Ian Allan. ISBN 978-0-7110-1647-7.
- Klapper, Charles (1974). The Golden Age of Tramways (2nd ed.). David & Charles. ISBN 978-0-7153-6458-1.
