= Albert Memorial Clock, Belfast =

Clock tower in Belfast

Coordinates: 54°36′03″N 5°55′28″W

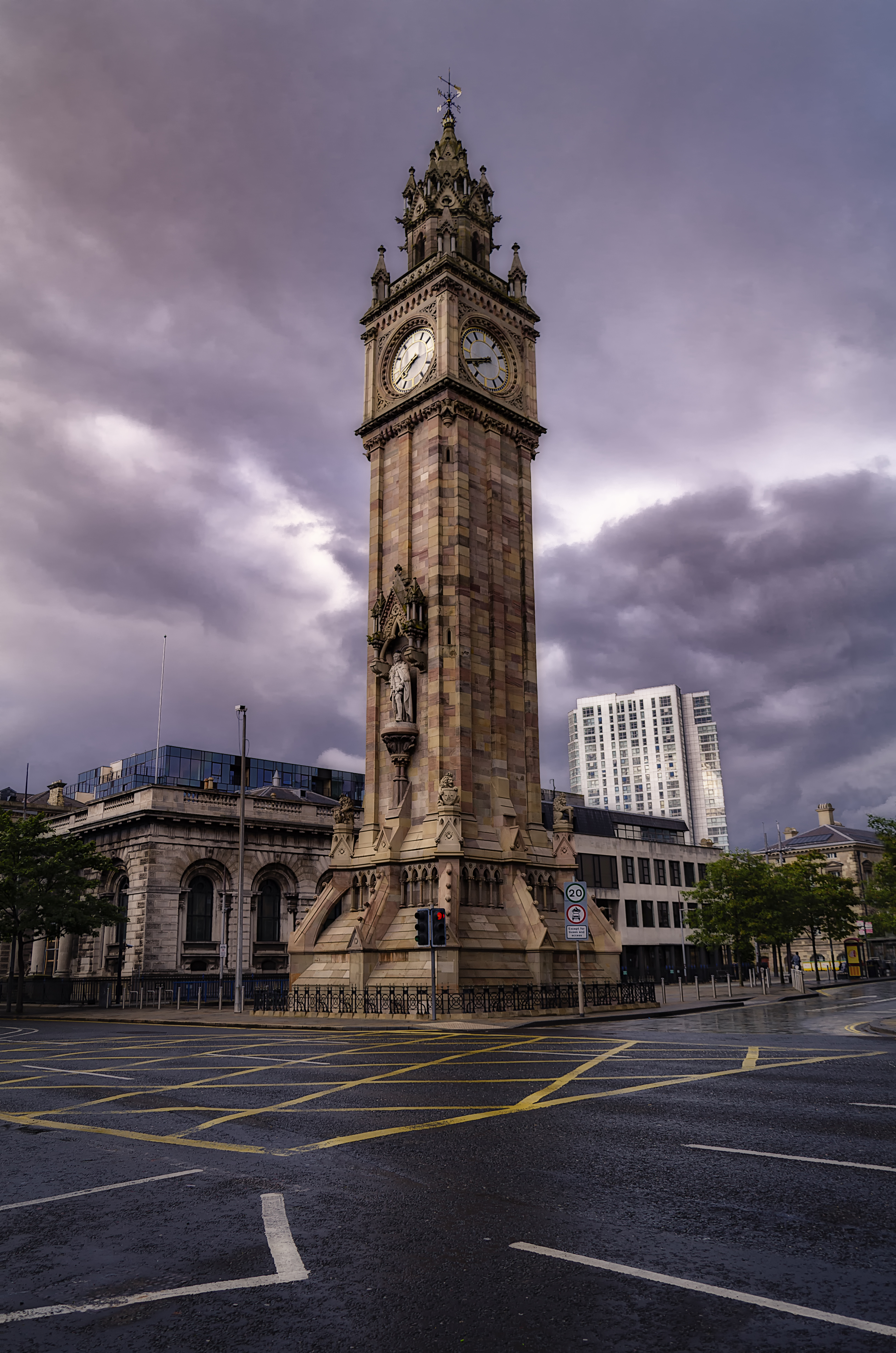
Albert Clock, 2016

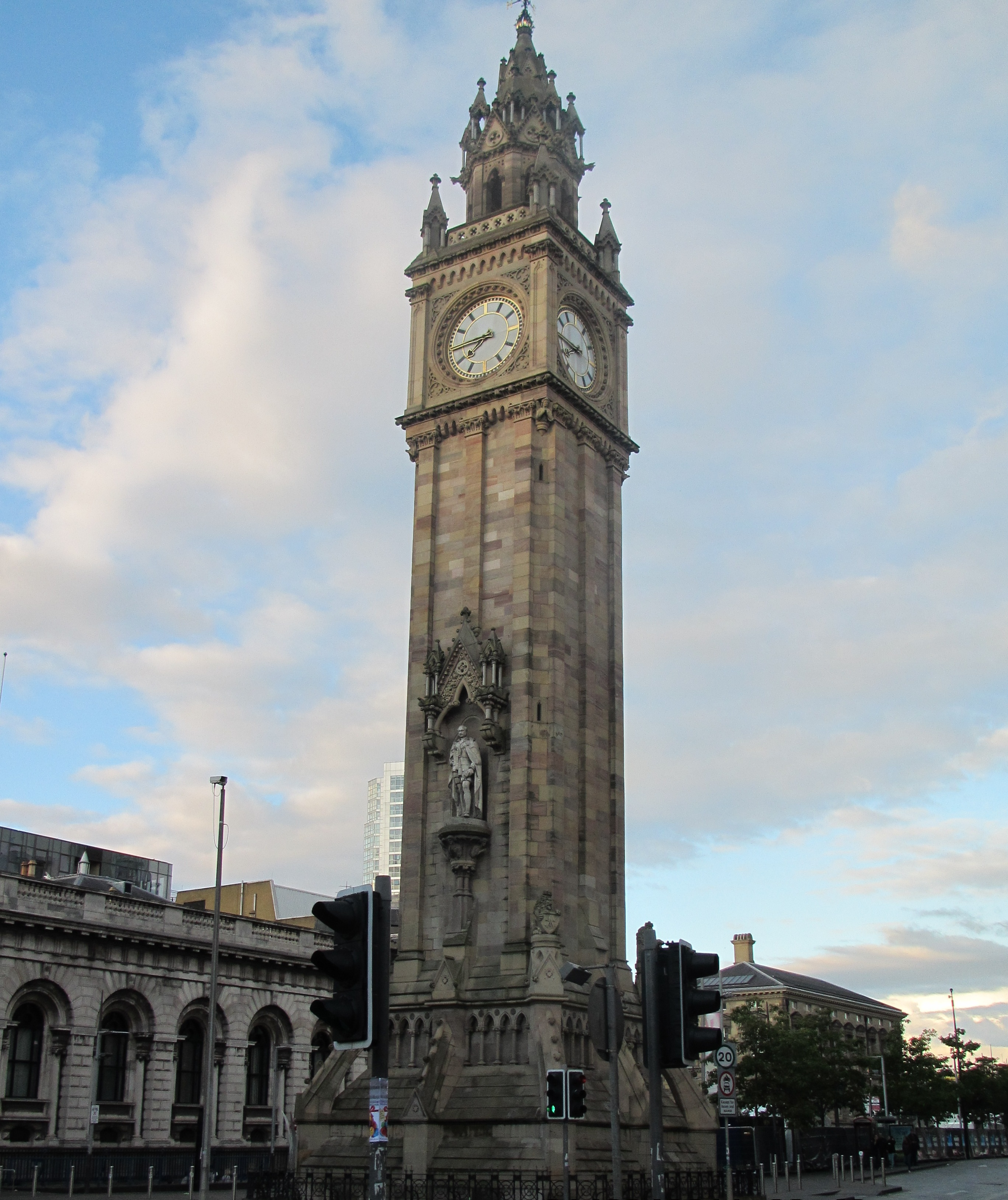
Albert Memorial Clock, Queens Square, Belfast, 2011

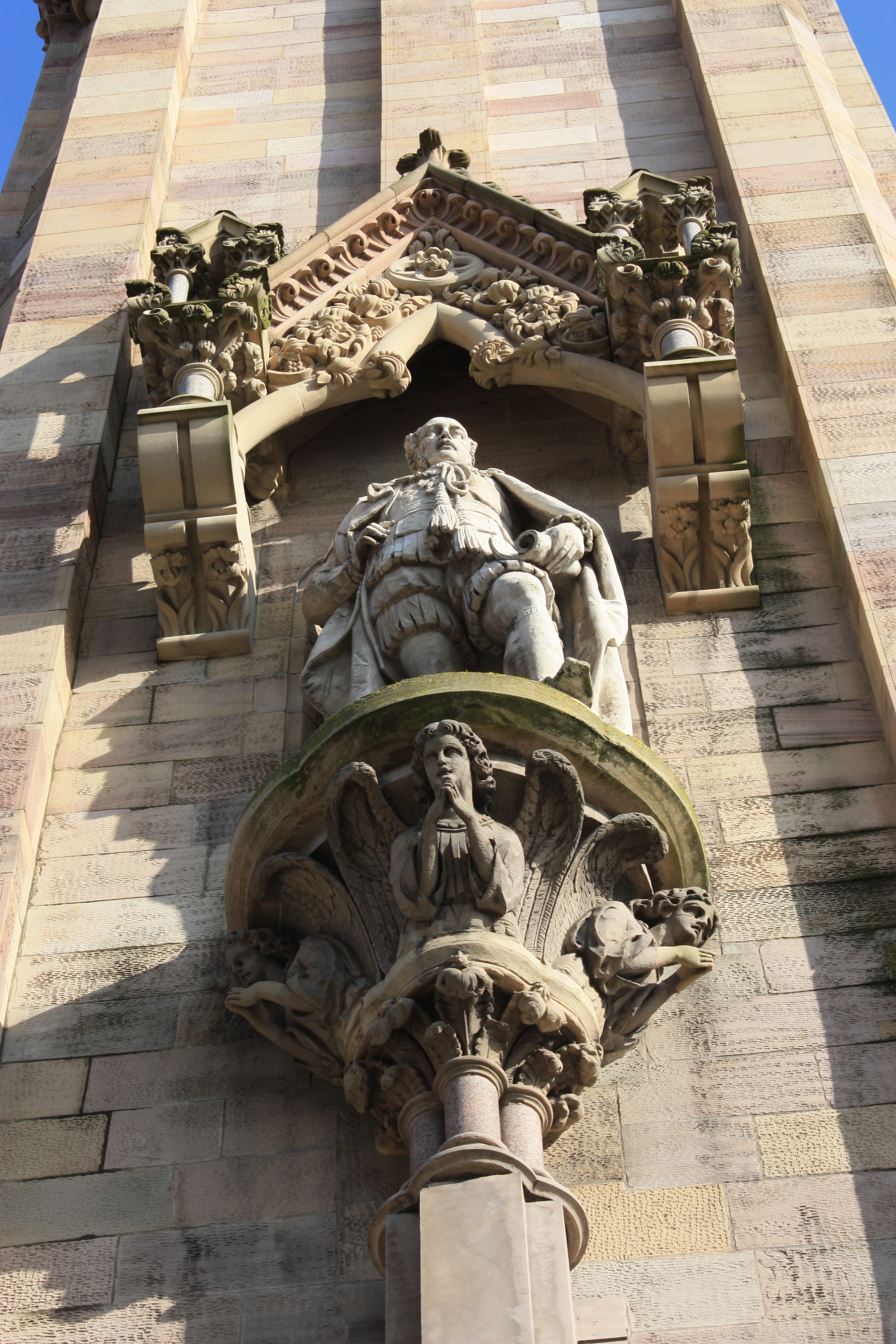
Prince Albert statue, Albert Memorial Clock, Queens Square, Belfast, October 2009

The Albert Memorial Clock (more commonly referred to as the Albert Clock) is a clock tower situated at Queen's Square in Belfast, Northern Ireland. It was completed in 1869 and is one of the best known landmarks of Belfast.

== History ==
In 1865 a competition for the design of a memorial to Queen Victoria's late Prince consort, Prince Albert, was won by W. J. Barre, who had earlier designed Belfast's Ulster Hall. Initially Barre was not awarded his prize and the contract was secretly given to Lanyon, Lynn, and Lanyon, who had come second. Following public outcry the contract was eventually awarded to Barre. The construction cost of £2,500 (2011: £184,000) was raised by public subscription.

The sandstone memorial was constructed between 1865 and 1869 by Fitzpatrick Brothers builders and stands 113 feet tall in a mix of French and Italian Gothic styles. The base of the tower features flying buttresses with heraldic lions. A statue of the Prince in the robes of a Knight of the Garter stands on the western side of the tower and is sculpted by SF Lynn. A two tonne bell is housed in the tower and the clock was made by Francis Moore of High Street, Belfast.

As a result of being built on wooden piles on marshy, reclaimed land around the River Farset, the top of the tower leans four feet off the perpendicular. Due to this movement, some ornamental work on the belfry was removed in 1924 along with a stone canopy over the statue of the Prince. This gave rise to the expression that the tower “has the time and the inclination.”

Being situated close to the docks, the tower was once infamous for being frequented by prostitutes plying their trade with visiting sailors. However, in recent years regeneration has turned the surrounding Queen's Square and Custom's House Square into attractive, modern public spaces with trees, fountains and sculptures.

The clock was damaged in a Provisional Irish Republican Army bomb explosion outside nearby River House in High Street on 6 January 1992.

== Restoration ==
To halt the worsening lean and repair damage caused by the elements and heavy passing traffic, a multimillion-pound restoration project was completed in 2002. During the project the wooden foundations were strengthened, the majority of the decaying carvings were replaced and the entire tower was cleaned.

== In media ==
In 1947, the film Odd Man Out was filmed partly in Belfast, with the Albert Clock as a central location, although neither the town nor the clock is explicitly identified.

This clock appears in Danger Man S3E4 You are not in any Trouble, Are you?, filmed in 1965.

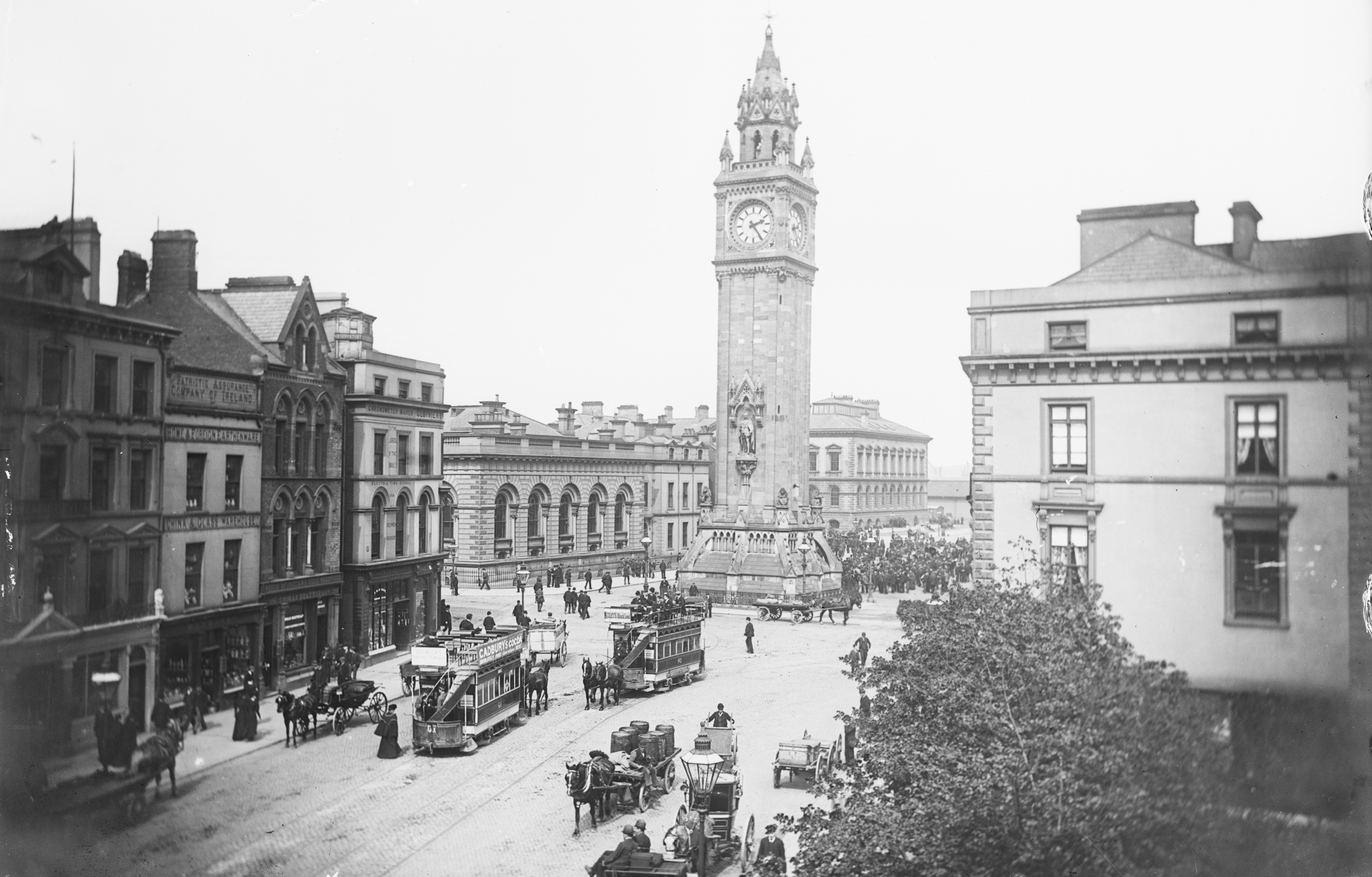
Albert Memorial with Belfast Street Tramways in 1901.

== See also ==
- List of leaning towers
- List of public art in Belfast
