= AEC 664T =

British three-axle double deck trolleybus chassis

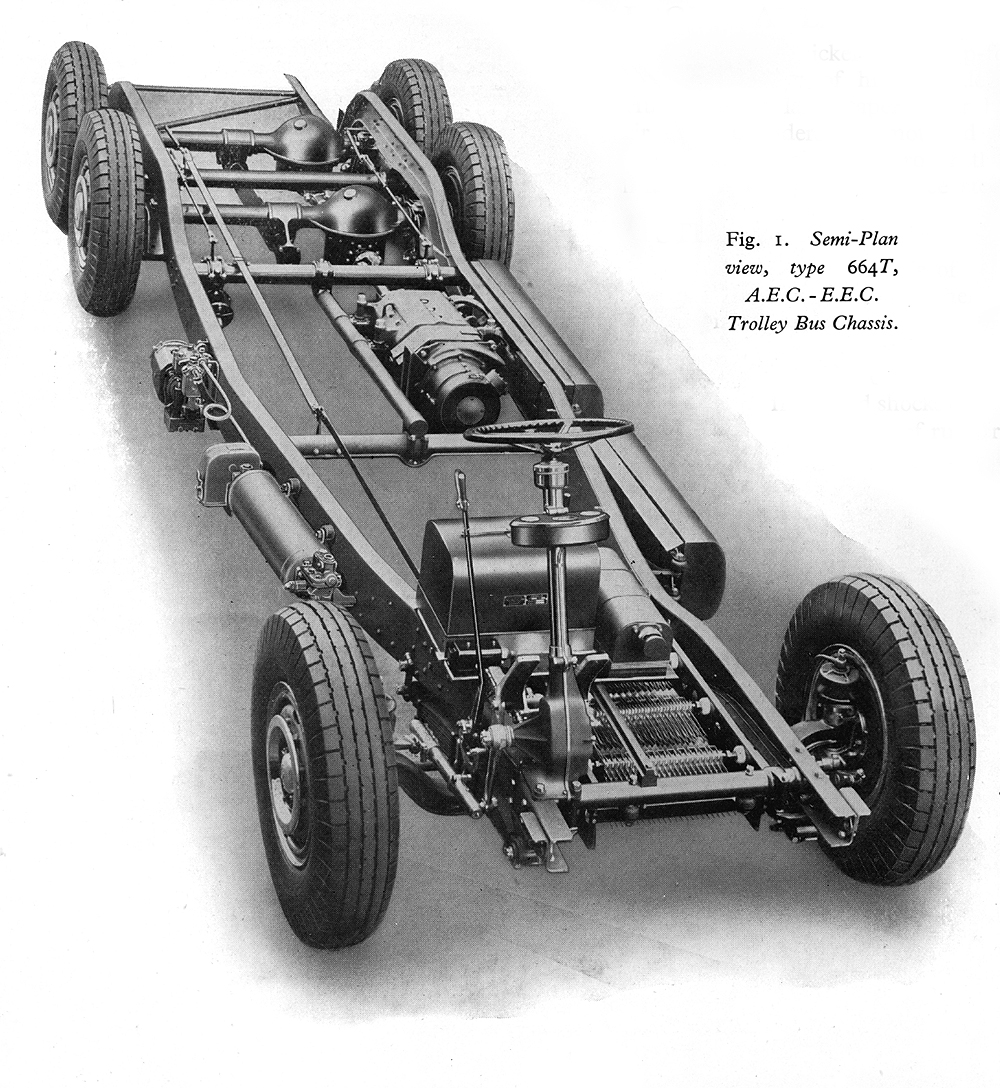

Overview
- Manufacturer: AEC
- Production: 1933 - 1942

Body and chassis
- Doors: 1
- Related: AEC Renown

The AEC 664T was a 18 ft. 7 5/16 in. wheelbase three-axle double deck trolleybus chassis manufactured by AEC between 1933 and 1942 and designated for installation of up to 74 passengers' rear- or central-entrance 30 ft. (length) x 7 ft. 6 in. (width) body. Based on the AEC Renown bus chassis, 796 were built for British operators including 660 for the London Passenger Transport Board for whom it was primarily developed.

An ″Overseas″ significantly revised variation of this chassis with left-hand steering was also developed to accommodate a single-deck 32 ft. (length) x 8 ft. 3 in. (width) body for seating up to 40 passengers with front entrance and central exit. The chassis had a special wide track and a dropped frame member to permit a ″pay-as-you-enter″ entrance platform in front of the front wheel. A new feature was that all the contactor gear and resistances were mounted at the rear of the chassis. Several chassis of this 664T Overseas type were supplied for service in Montreal, becoming the first trolleybuses put into operation in Canada.

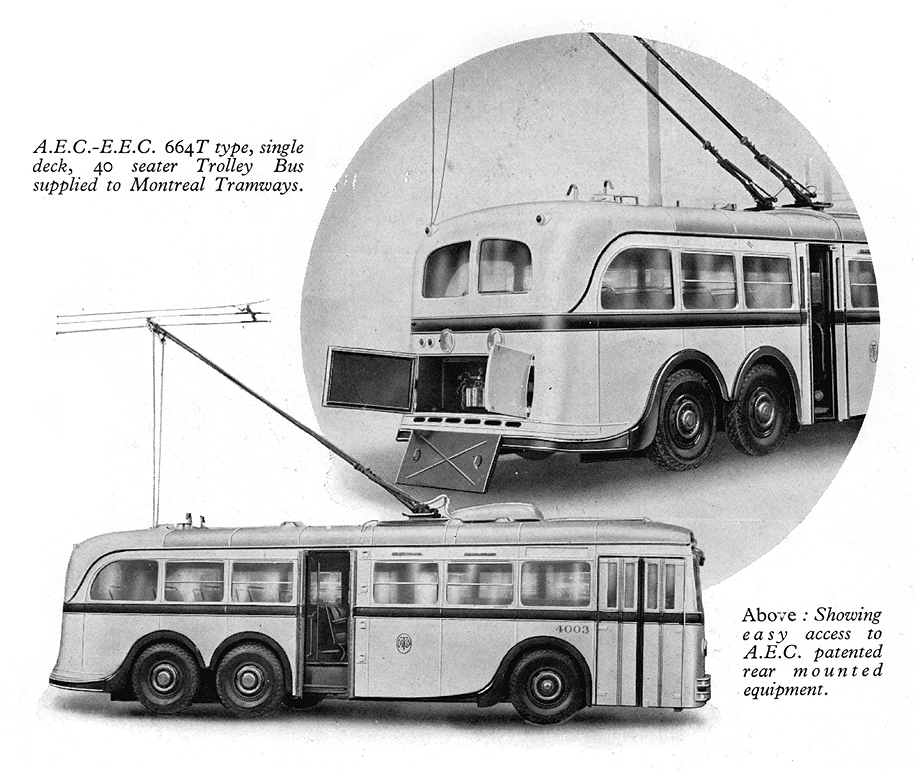
A.E.C.-E.E.C. 664T type, single deck, 40 seater Trolley Bus supplied to Montreal Tramways.
