= Trolleybuses in Belfast =

Belfast trolleybus system
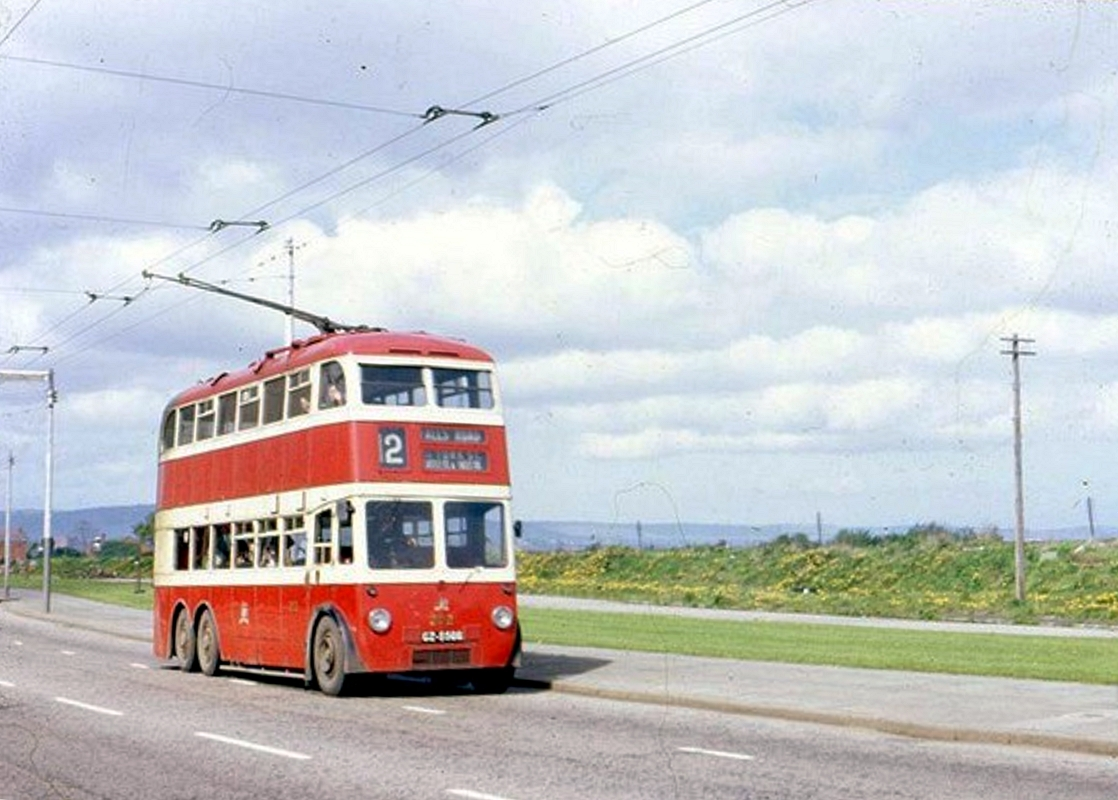
- Harkness-bodied British United Traction (BUT) number 202 in Shore Road in May 1968

Operation
- Locale: Belfast, Northern Ireland
- Open: 28 March 1938
- Close: 12 May 1968
- Status: Closed
- Routes: 17
- Operator: Belfast Corporation Tramways

Infrastructure
- Electrification: (?) V DC parallel overhead lines
- Depot: 3
- Stock: 246 (maximum)

Statistics
- Route length: 37.5 miles (60.4 km)

The Belfast trolleybus system served the city of Belfast, Northern Ireland. It was the only trolleybus system built in Ireland. Opened on 28 March 1938, it gradually replaced the city’s tramway network.

The Belfast system was the second largest trolleybus system in the United Kingdom, after the London system. It had a total of 17 routes, and a maximum fleet of 245 trolleybuses. It closed on 12 May 1968.

== History ==
In 1936, Belfast Corporation's tramway committee recommended that an experimental trolleybus service be inaugurated after inspecting the Birmingham, Bournemouth, London, Nottingham, Portsmouth and Wolverhampton systems. Seven pairs of chassis from AEC, Crossley, Daimler, Guy, Karrier, Leyland and Sunbeam were acquired. These were fitted with six types of electric motor with coachwork by five different builders, and were supplied on the proviso that should the trial be a success, Belfast Corporation would purchase them, and should it fail they would be returned.

On 28 March 1938, operations commenced out of Falls Park depot along Falls Road. This was chosen as being a virtually stand-alone route.

Judged a success, Belfast Corporation decided to replace the entire tramway network. An order was placed with AEC for 114 trolleybuses; however, wartime constraints resulted in only 88 being delivered.

On 13 February 1941 operations began in East Belfast when the Cregagh route commenced from the new Haymarket depot. The network gradually expanded, with the last of the tram network closing in 1954. Further sections were added until 1959 to a total of 37.5 miles. In order to speed up the conversion, eleven second-hand trolleybuses were purchased from Wolverhampton in 1952. In 1958 a prototype Sunbeam was acquired with a view to replacing the earlier vehicles; however, shortly afterwards the first section of the network closed, with the final section closing on 12 May 1968.

== Fleet ==
Fleet numbers	Quantity	Chassis	Body	In service	Notes
1-2	2	AEC 664T	Harkness	1938-1958	
3	1	Crossley TDD6	Crossley	1938-1958	
4	1	Crossley TDD6	Harkness	1938-1958	
5-6	2	Daimler CTM6	Harkness	1938-1958	
7	1	Guy BTX	Park Royal	1938-1958	
8	1	Guy BTX	Harkness	1938-1958	
9-10	2	Karrier E6A	Harkness	1938-1958	
11-12	2	Leyland TTB4	Leyland	1938-1958	
13-14	2	Sunbeam MS2	Cowieson	1938-1958	
15-102	88	AEC 664T	Harkness	1940-1963	
103-128	26	Guy BTX	Harkness	1948-1963	
129-130	2	Sunbeam W4	Park Royal	1941-1958	
131-142	12	Sunbeam W4	Harkness	1946-1960	
143-186	44	Guy BTX	Harkness	1948-1965	
187-234	48	BUT 9641T	Harkness	1950-1968	
235-240	6	Sunbeam MF2	Park Royal	1952-1956	ex Wolverhampton
241-245	5	Sunbeam MF2	Charles H Roe	1952-1956	ex Wolverhampton
246	1	Sunbeam F4A	Harkness	1958-1968	

Trolleybuses were initially painted in a blue and white livery. After World War II this was changed to red and white with silver wheels.

=== In preservation ===
Five former Belfast trolleybuses have been preserved:

- AEC 664T 98 and Guy BTX 112 at the Ulster Folk & Transport Museum, Cultra
- Guy BTX 168 at the Keighley Bus Museum
- Guy BTX 183 at the National Transport Museum of Ireland, Dublin
- Sunbeam F4A 246 at the East Anglia Transport Museum, Carlton Colville

== Depots ==
Trolleybuses operated from three depots:

- Falls Park
- Haymarket
- Short Strand

== See also ==
- History of Belfast
- Transport in Belfast
- List of trolleybus systems in the United Kingdom
