= Belfast Street Tramways =

Defunct horse-drawn tramway in Belfast, Ireland

- One of the company's tramcars on York Street

Operation
- Locale: Belfast
- Open: 28 August 1872
- Close: 1 January 1905
- Status: Closed

Infrastructure
- Track gauge: 1,435 mm (4 ft 8 1/2 in) and 5 ft 3 in (1,600 mm)
- Propulsion system: Horse

Statistics
- Route length: 24.95 miles (40.15 km)

The Belfast Street Tramways operated horse-drawn tramway services in Belfast from 1872 to 1905. Its lines later formed a major part of the Belfast Corporation Tramways.

== History ==
The initial tramway services were constructed by the Belfast Tramways Company.

On 10 August 1872 they were taken over by the Belfast Street Tramways Company. The initial track gauge was 5 ft 3 in (1,600 mm). The depots were on Sandy Row, Lisburn Road, Mount Pottinger, Knock, Antrim Road and Falls Road.

== Steam tram experiment ==
On 30 June 1877 a Henry Hughes and Company steam tram engine "The Pioneer" was tried on the Belfast system. Despite the trial proving successful with no smoke or noise emitted and no horses being frightened, official permission to operate steam services was not forthcoming.

On 29 November 1877 the company promoted the bill to revise the track gauge to 1,435 mm (4 ft 8 1/2 in). The bill was passed in 1878 but the clauses to allow steam working were removed because of objections from John Freeman-Mitford, 1st Earl of Redesdale.

== Sydenham District, Belfast Tramway ==
This independent company built a line from Old Holywood Road, Belmont to connect with Belfast Street Tramways on the Newtownards Road. The company leased tramcars and staff from the Belfast Street Tramways Company.

In 1902 the company was purchased by the Belfast Street Tramways Company.

== Belfast and Ligoniel Tramway ==
This independent company built a line from Ligoniel to connect with the Belfast Street Tramways at the Brookfield Street, Crumlin Road intersection. Services started on 24 April 1893.

In 1902 the company was purchased by the Belfast Street Tramways Company.

== Belfast and County Down Railway tramway ==
The Belfast and County Down Railway constructed this 111 yards (101 m) line to connect Belfast Queen's Quay railway station to the Belfast Street Tramways line near Queen's Bridge. The tramcars on this line were operated by the Belfast Street Tramways Company.

This line was purchased by Belfast Corporation in 1902.

== Closure ==
The company was purchased by Belfast Corporation on 1 January 1905, comprising 171 tramcars, 2 horse buses, and 4 water trams.

The corporation undertook a programme of modernisation and electrification, and services continued as Belfast Corporation Tramways.

Tramcar 118 survived and has been restored and is now on view at the Ulster Folk and Transport Museum, Cultra.

== Gallery ==
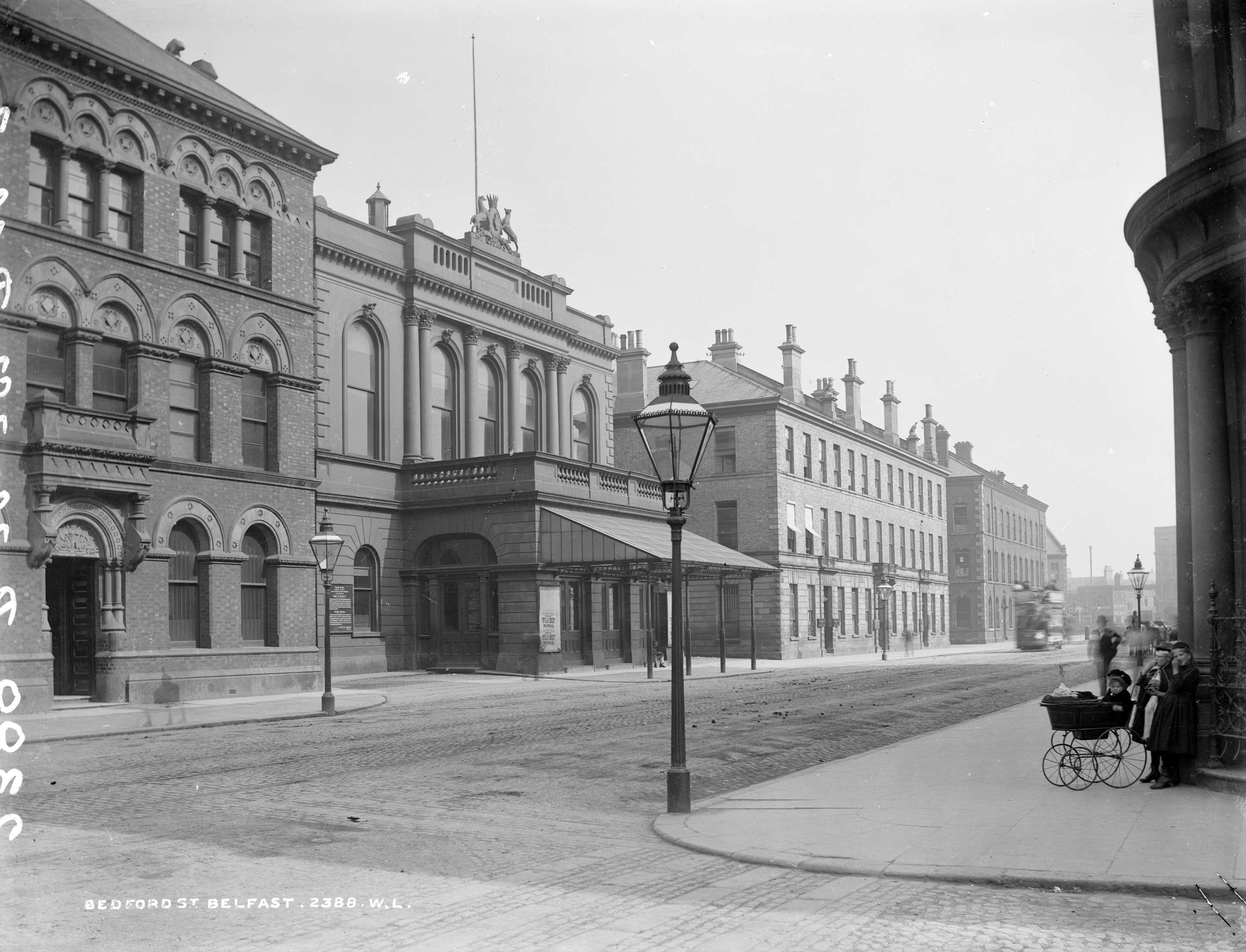
A tram in Bedford Street near the Ulster Hall circa 1890.

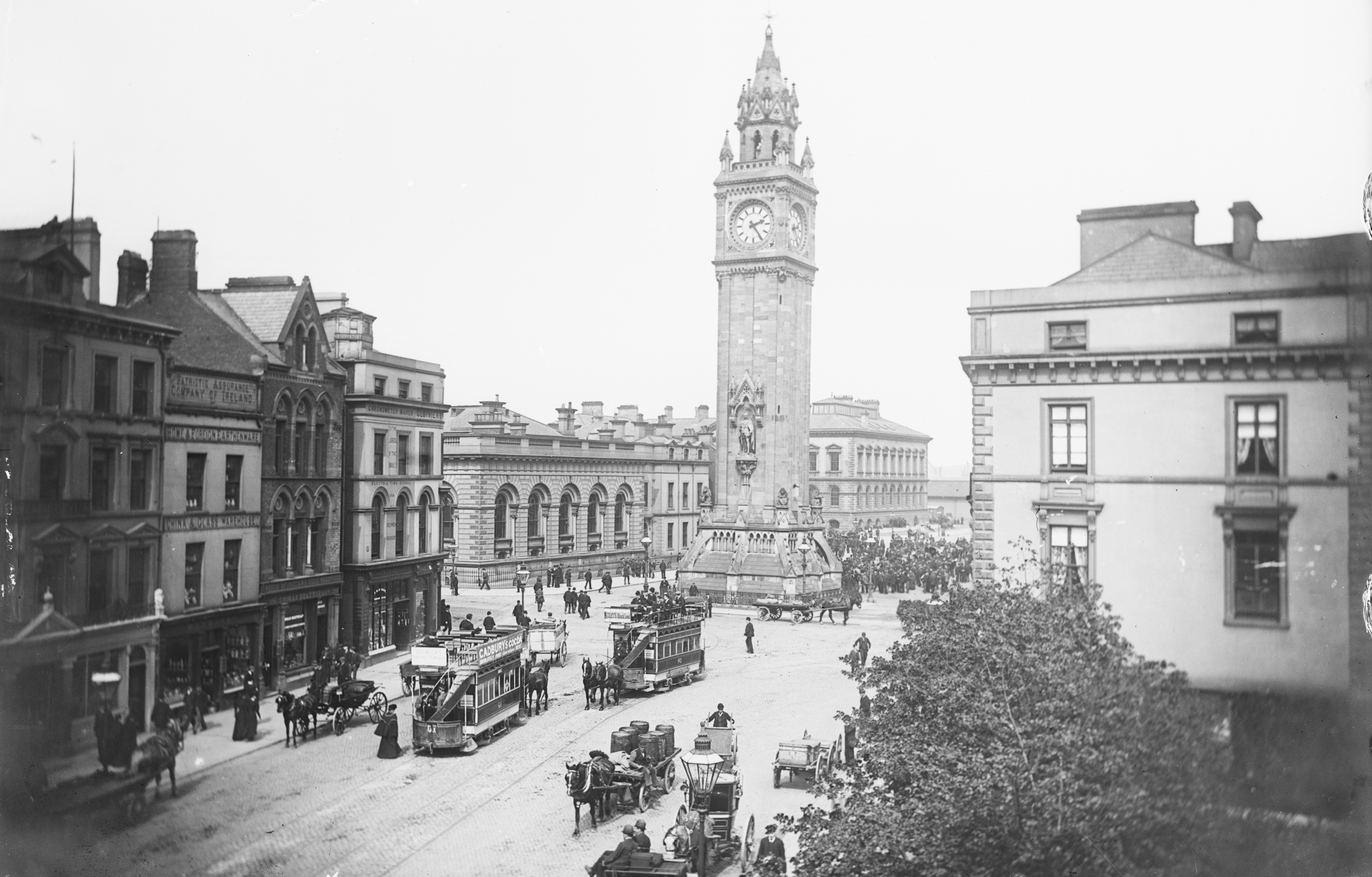
The Albert Clock in 1901 with horse trams.

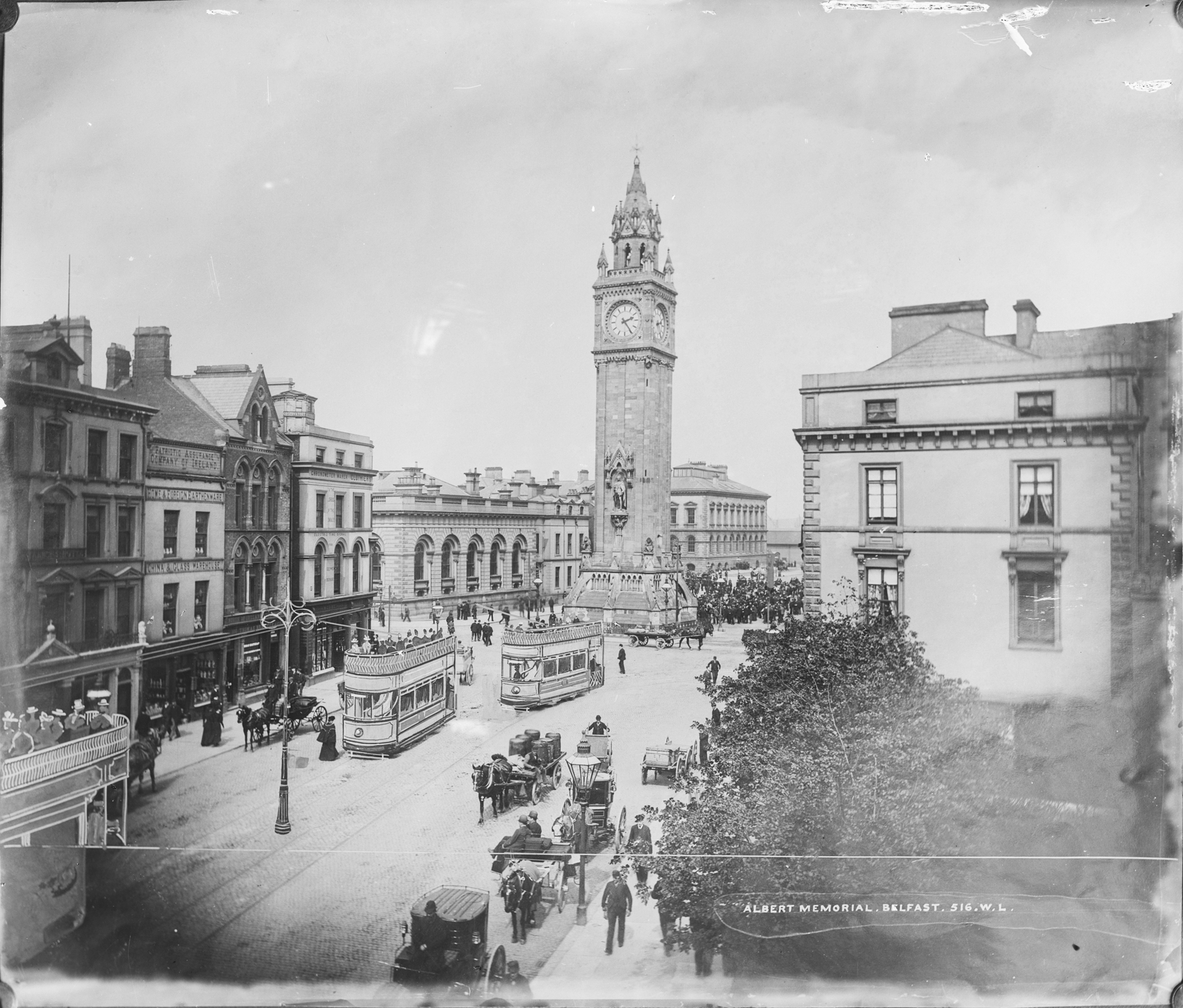
The Albert Clock with electric trams edited onto the previous picture with horse trams.

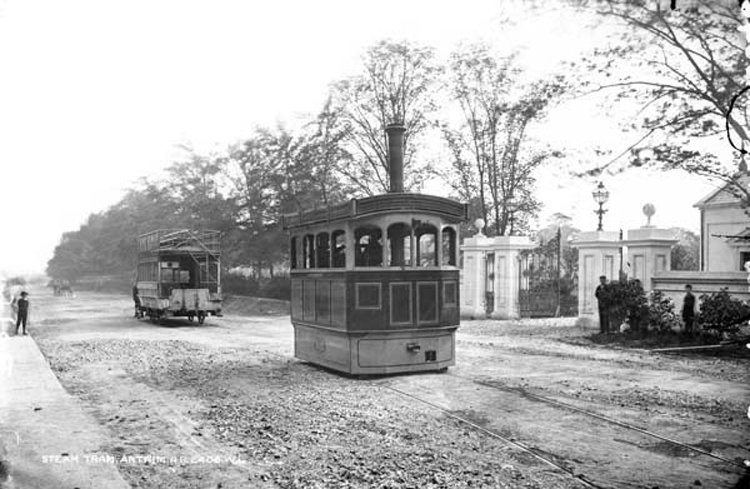
A steam tram on the Antrim Road.
