= British United Traction =

British railway equipment and trolleybus manufacturer

- Industry: Bus manufacturing
- Founded: 1946
- Defunct: 1964
- Owner: AEC; Leyland

British United Traction (BUT) was a manufacturer of railway equipment and trolleybuses. It was established in 1946 as a joint venture between AEC and Leyland.

== History ==
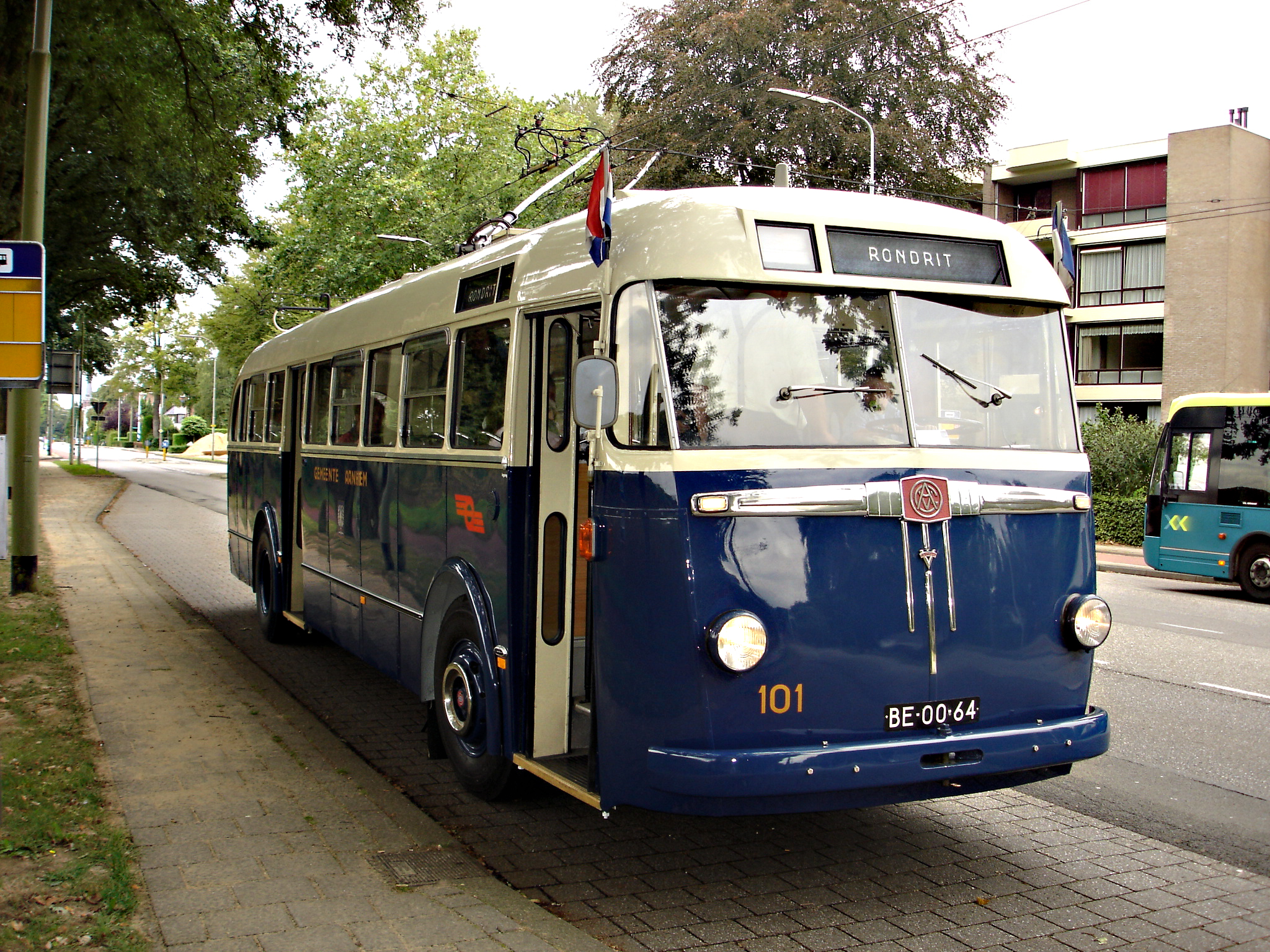
Historical BUT trolleybus #101 in Arnhem

British United Traction was established in 1946 when AEC and Leyland amalgamated their trolleybus interests. Neither had produced trolleybuses since the early years of World War II. With both forecasting that demand would return to pre-war levels as networks began to close, a joint venture was formed. The new company was organised so that AEC would design and produce vehicles for the UK market while Leyland looked after export markets, although there were some exceptions to this. The only noticeable difference between the manufacturers' output was the wheels.

Initially vehicles were produced at Leyland's Ham, London factory, with the first vehicles completed in 1947 for Johannesburg. After the factory closed in 1948, production moved to AEC's Southall and Leyland's Leyland, Lancashire factories. Following AEC's acquisition of Crossley Motors, AEC transferred its production to the latter's Stockport factory. Trolleybus production wound down in the late 1950s, however a final batch for Wellington was built at Scammell's, Watford factory in 1964.

== Trolleybuses ==
- 9611T
- 9612T
- 9613T
- 9641T
- RETB1 / LETB1

== Diesel engines for railways ==
British United Traction was a major supplier of diesel engines for British Rail's first-generation diesel multiple units. These engines were built in 125 hp (93 kW) or 150 hp (110 kW) versions and were branded BUT, although manufactured by BUT's parent companies, AEC and Leyland. There was also a 230 hp (170 kW) BUT engine, manufactured by Albion, a Leyland subsidiary.

A 275 hp (205 kW) version was supplied to the Ulster Transport Authority for its UTA MPD class railcar.

== BUT / ACV railcars ==
BUT / ACV railcars
- In service: 1952–1960
- Manufacturers: British United Traction; Associated Commercial Vehicles (AEC, Park Royal Vehicles)
- Order nos.: List: 30128 (DMT+TT+DMBT, 79740-79742); 30174 (DMBT, 79743-79744); 30175 (DMT, 79745); 30176 (TT, 79746-79747); 30214 (DMS, 79748); 30215 (TS, 79749); 30216 (DMBS, 79750)
- Family name: First generation
- Replaced: Steam locomotives and carriages
- Constructed: 1952, 1955–1957
- Scrapped: 1963
- Number built: 3 DMT/DMS, 4 DMBT/DMBS, 4 TT/TS (Note: Third Class (T) was renamed Second Class (S) in 1956.)
- Number scrapped: All
- Formation: 1-, 2-, or 3-car sets
- Capacity: DMT/DMS: 41 (prototype car), 34 (production cars); DMBT/DMBS: 28; TT/TS: 48
- Operator: British Rail
- Depot: Watford

Specifications
- Car length: 37 ft 6 in (11.43 m)
- Width: 9 ft 0 in (2.74 m)
- Height: 11 ft 4 in (3.45 m)
- Wheelbase: 22 ft 0 in (6.71 m)
- Maximum speed: 45 mph (72 km/h)
- Weight: 15 long tons (15 t) (motor cars), 10.5 long tons (10.7 t) (trailers)
- Prime movers: AEC 6-cylinder diesel, one per motor car
- Power output: 125 bhp (93 kW) each engine
- Transmission: Mechanical: 4-speed epicyclic gearbox
- Coupling system: Screw-link couplings
- Track gauge: 4 ft 8 1/2 in (1,435 mm)

In 1952, British United Traction introduced a prototype diesel-mechanical multiple unit as a demonstrator. This was followed by orders for production units built from 1955 to 1957. The units were designed by BUT and constructed by Associated Commercial Vehicles group companies, with underframes and engines by AEC and bodies by Park Royal Vehicles. Instead of bogies, each vehicle had a two-axle four-wheel arrangement. The demonstrator unit was introduced as a 3-car set with two motor cars and a centre trailer car. In addition to operating as either a 3 or 2-car set, each motor car was equipped with driving controls at both ends and could operate as single-car units, with a similar configuration to the later British Rail railbuses.

=== Operations ===
The demonstrator unit underwent a series of trials across all regions of British Railways, often on low revenue routes. The first trials were operated between Didcot and Newbury, followed by trials on High Wycombe-Princes Risborough, Epping-Ongar, Watford-St Albans, Chalfont & Latimer-Chesham, Bangor-Amlwch, Ayr-Dalmellington, Hull-South Howden, Birmingham-Solihull, Gravesend-Allhallows-on-Sea, Wellingborough-Higham Ferrers and Harrow-Belmont services.

BR acquired the set in 1955, together with a second 3-car set and a spare motor car and trailer. Under BR ownership, these units worked on regular Watford-St Albans services. A third 3-car set was delivered in 1957 and operations were expanded to include regular Harrow-Belmont services.

=== Withdrawal ===
The units were unreliable in regular service, and were noted for their poor ride quality. By 1961, all vehicles had been moved to Derby Friargate for storage. No other use could be found for them, and all units were subsequently withdrawn and scrapped at Derby C&W Works by 1963.

=== Fleet details ===
Table of orders and numbers
Lot No.	Type	Diagram (Note: Diagram numbers apply to 3-car sets, not individual cars.)	Qty	Fleet numbers	Notes
30128	Driving Motor Third (DMT)	500	1	79740	41 seats
30128	Trailer Third (TT)	500	1	79741	48 seats
30128	Driving Motor Brake Third (DMBT)	500	1	79742	28 seats
30174	Driving Motor Brake Third (DMBT)	506	2	79743-79744	28 seats
30175	Driving Motor Third (DMT)	506	1	79745	34 seats
30176	Trailer Third (TT)	506	2	79746-79747	48 seats
30214	Driving Motor Second (DMS)	506	1	79748	34 seats
30215	Trailer Second (TS)	506	1	79749	48 seats
30216	Driving Motor Brake Second (DMBS)	506	1	79750	28 seats
