= BUT 9641T =

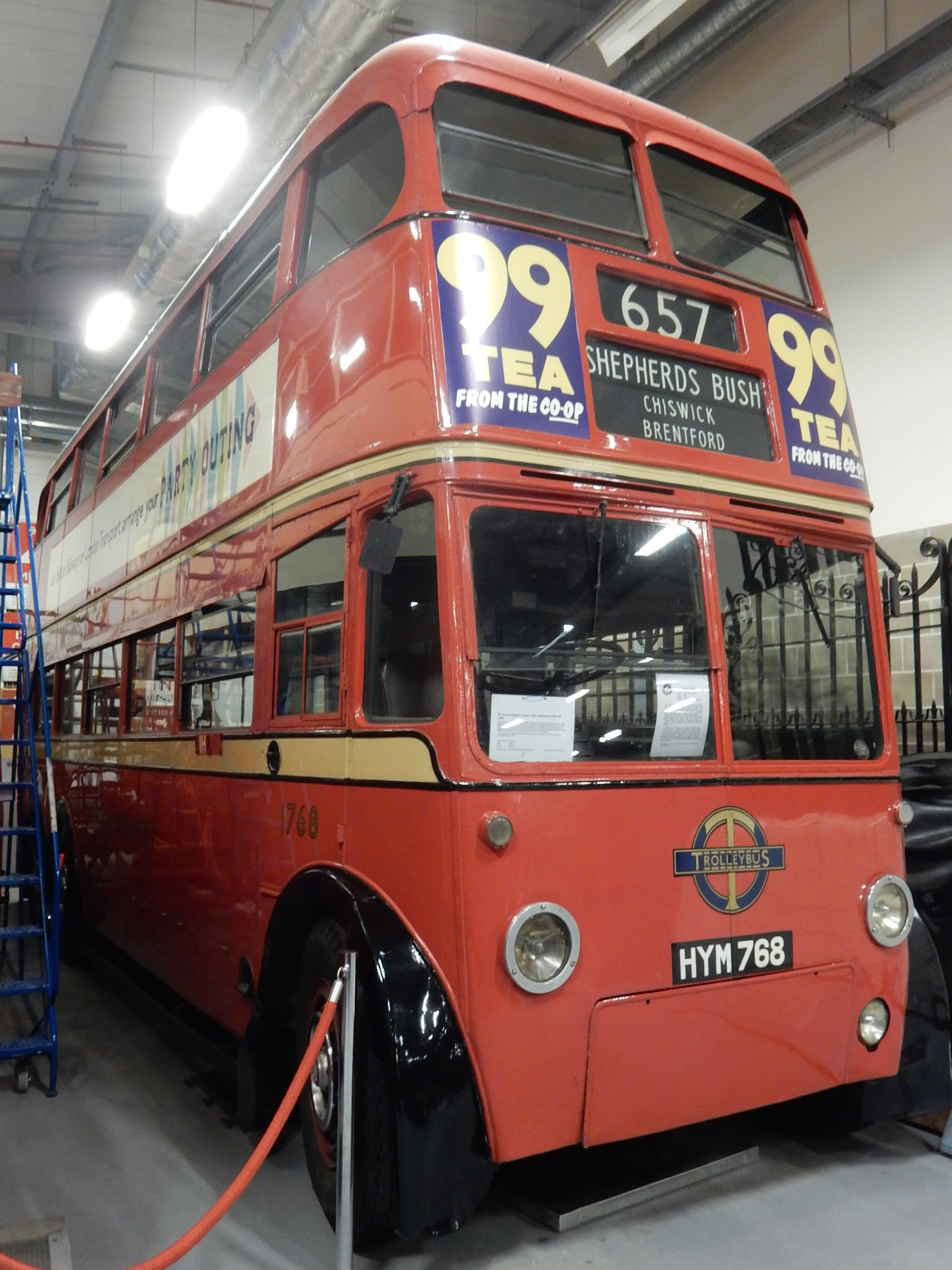
- Preserved BUT 9641T trolleybus at the London Transport Museum Acton depot

Overview
- Manufacturer: British United Traction
- Production: 1947 - 1956
- Assembly: Ham; Southall; Stockport

Body and chassis
- Doors: 1

Dimensions
- Length: 30 ft (9.1 m)

The BUT 9641T was a three-axle double deck trolleybus chassis manufactured by British United Traction between 1947 and 1956. A total of 498 were manufactured for eight operators in England at Leyland's Ham, AEC's Southall and Crossley Motors' Stockport factories. 127 were supplied to London Transport, forming their Q1 class, and Nottingham purchased 102.

As of 2024, around eleven 9641T trolleybuses are preserved in the UK, including examples at the East Anglia Transport Museum in Suffolk and the Trolleybus Museum at Sandtoft in Yorkshire.
