= Trolleybuses in London =

Trolleybuses serving the London Passenger Transport Area

London trolleybus system
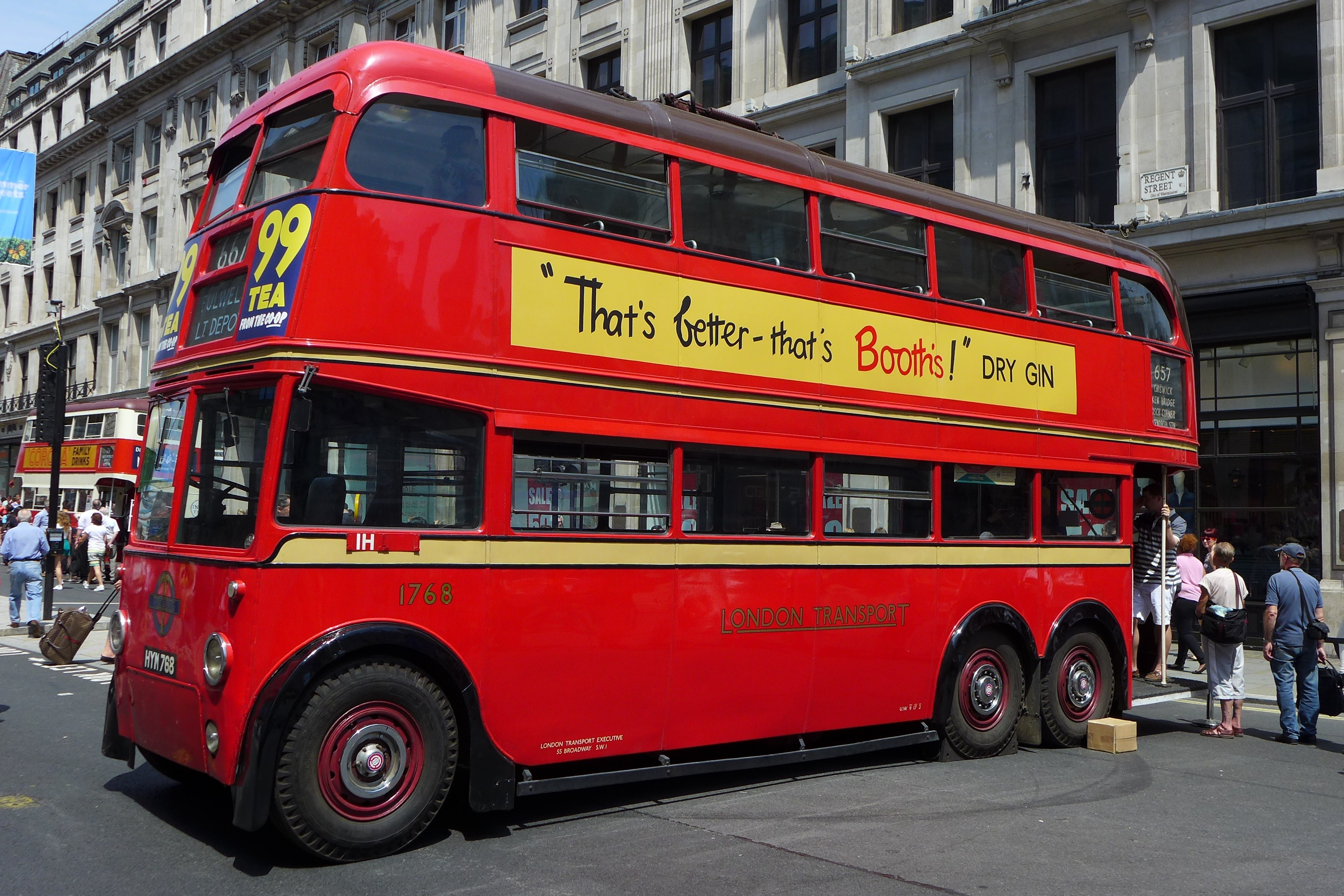
- Preserved British United Traction trolleybus on Regent Street in June 2014

Operation
- Locale: London, England
- Open: 16 May 1931
- Close: 8 May 1962
- Status: Closed
- Routes: 68
- Operators: London United Tramways (1931–1933); London Passenger Transport Board (1933–1947); London Transport Executive (1947–1962)

Infrastructure
- Electrification: 550 V DC parallel overhead lines
- Stock: 1,811 (maximum)

Trolleybuses served the London Passenger Transport Area from 1931 until 1962. For much of its existence, the London system was the largest in the world. It peaked at 68 routes, with a maximum fleet of 1,811 trolleybuses.

== History ==
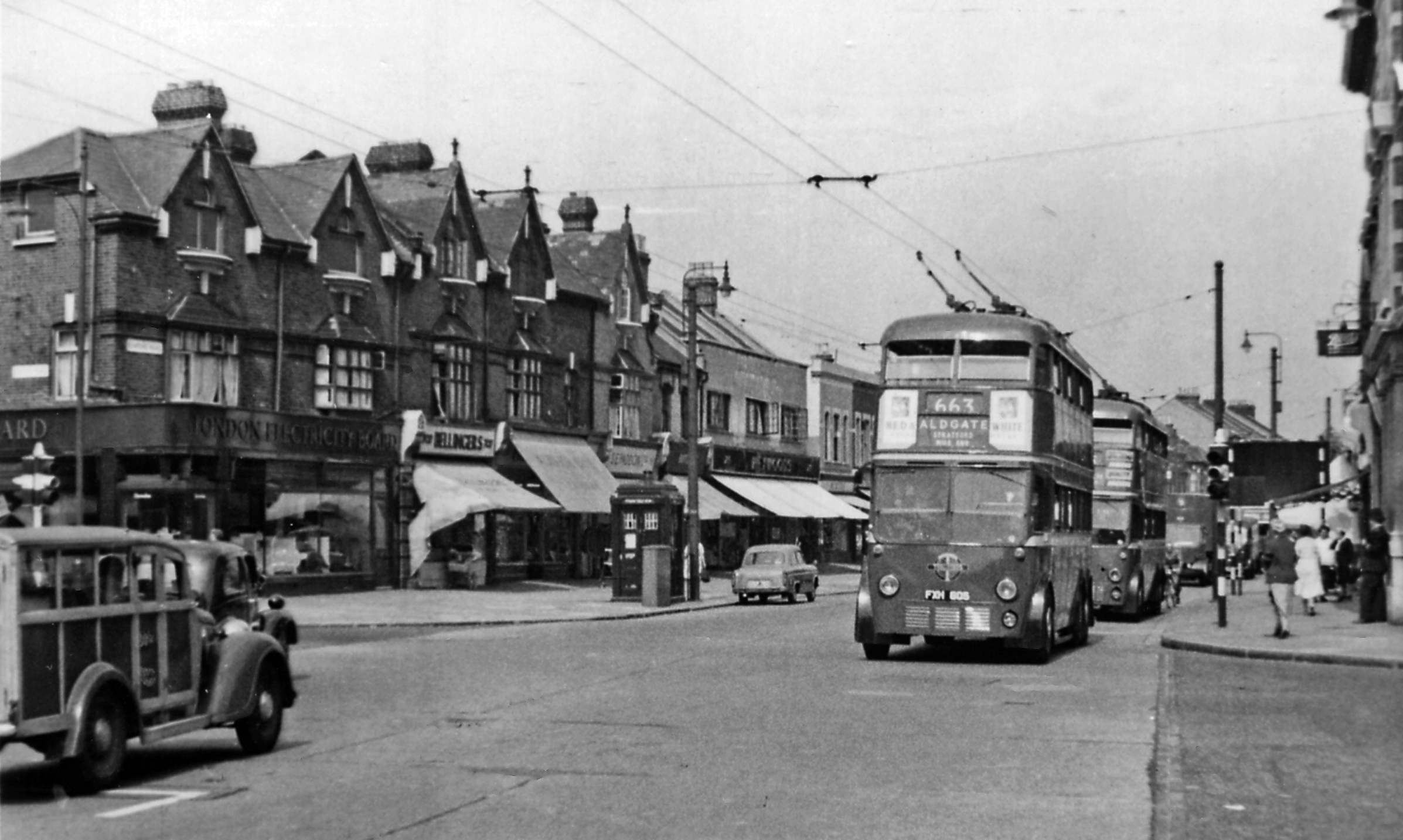
Two west-bound trolleybuses on Romford Road, Ilford, in July 1955

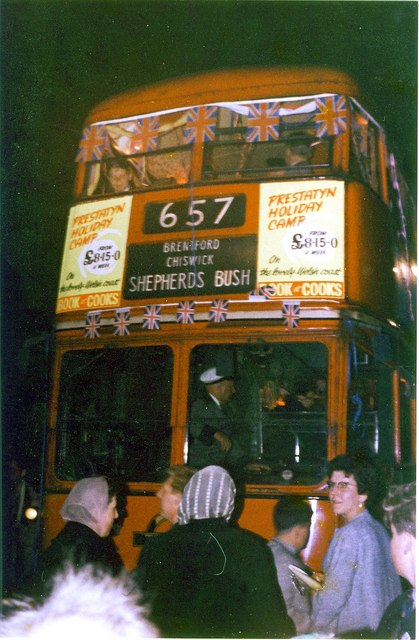
The last trolleybus on 8 May 1962

London's first 60 trolleybuses were introduced by London United Tramways (LUT), operating from Fulwell bus garage in South-West London. They were nicknamed "Diddlers" and commenced running on 16 May 1931.

In 1933, LUT was absorbed into the London Passenger Transport Board (LPTB) along with other tram operators, the largest being London County Council (LCC). The LPTB decided to replace all trams with trolleybuses. This started in October 1935, with two more former LUT routes, and continued in stages until June 1940, when World War II caused the suspension of the programme. By then, nearly all the trams North of the River Thames had been replaced, but there were still some 1,100 trams servicing South London. In 1946, a change in policy meant that all remaining tramlines would be replaced by diesel buses. As trolleybuses were bigger than diesel buses (70 seats compared to 56), this meant that more diesel buses were required. It was hoped, however, that this would result in fewer uncollected fares on the smaller vehicles.

In 1948, a new batch of 77 trolleybuses replaced the Diddlers, and those which had been destroyed by enemy action. A further 50 new trolleybuses were delivered in 1952 to replace the oldest vehicles, which were then 16 years old.

In 1954, it was announced that all trolleybuses were to be replaced by diesel buses, with the exception of the post-war vehicles, which would be retained until about 1970 and run over the original LUT routes. Conversion began in 1959, using AEC Regent III RT buses for the first three stages, and new AEC Routemasters for the remainder.

A consortium of Spanish operators bought the post-war vehicles, some of which were converted to motor buses. The former LUT routes were the last to be converted to diesel buses, on 8 May 1962.

== Fleet ==
The trolleybuses were designed and built specifically as replacements for trams. Like the trams, they were large high-capacity double deckers, with rapid acceleration. All but one had three axles (necessary as they were 30 feet long: at the time, two-axle vehicles could not exceed 26 feet), and were much quieter in operation than contemporary trams or diesel buses. Trolleybuses were built on AEC, Leyland and British United Traction (BUT) chassis.

Apart from the Diddlers and a few experimental vehicles, most London trolleybuses were near-identical. In 1941 and 1943 London Transport acquired 43 trolleybuses that had been ordered for South Africa but could not be shipped there because of the war. These vehicles were allocated to Ilford depot. They formed three different classes and needed special dispensation because they were eight feet wide, six inches more than the law then allowed.

Some later pre-war vehicles made use of modern monocoque construction techniques to produce chassisless bodies, where the mechanical and electrical parts, including the traction motors, are affixed to the bodywork and not to a separate chassis.

One experimental vehicle was proposed to be the forerunner of a small fleet that would use the Kingsway Tramway Subway, but proved in tests to be impractical. They were all six-wheel vehicles, of which one differed only in having 4-wheel steering and one ex-LUT 4-wheeler.

A handful of vehicles were destroyed during World War II, whilst a couple of dozen others were rebuilt after suffering damage from enemy action—at least one trolleybus was damaged and rebuilt twice.

The Q1 class were the only trolleybuses built for London after the War. A handful of pre-war vehicles were sold for further use in Penang (Malaysia), while most of the post-war ones were exported to Spain where they worked for various operators—some into the 1970s. A few were converted into motor buses.

Some London trolleybuses are now preserved in the United Kingdom by the East Anglia Transport Museum, the London Transport Museum, and The Trolleybus Museum at Sandtoft. One of the 1948 vehicles has also been repatriated from Spain.

List of trolleybus classes
Class	Fleet No.	Chassis	Bodywork	Comments
A1	1–35	AEC 663T	UCC	"Diddlers"; No.1 preserved (London Transport Museum)
A2	36–60	AEC 663T	UCC	"Diddlers"
X1	61	AEC 691T	LGOC	Experimental Pay As You Board, centre door only
X2	62	AEC 663T	Metro-Cammell	Lengthened wheelbase
X3	63	AEC 661T	English Electric	London's only 4-wheel trolleybus
B1	64–93	Leyland TTB2	BRCW	
B2	94–131	Leyland TTB2	Brush	
C1	132–141	AEC 664T	Weymann	
C1	142–183	AEC 664T	Metro-Cammell	
C2	184–283	AEC 664T	Metro-Cammell	No.260 preserved (East Anglia Transport Museum)
C3	284–383	AEC 664T	BRCW	
D1	384	Leyland LPTB70	Leyland	
D2	385–483	Leyland LPTB70	Metro-Cammell	
B3	484–488	Leyland TTB2	BRCW	
B1	489–493	Leyland TTB2	BRCW	
D3	494–553	Leyland LPTB70	BRCW	
E1	554–603	AEC 664T	Brush	
E2	604–628	AEC 664T	Weymann	
E3	629–653	AEC 664T	Park Royal	
F1	654–753	Leyland LPTB70	Leyland	
X4	754	(Note: Chassisless vehicles with AEC 664T running units)	LPTB	Experimental Pay As You Enter (rear door) front exit, both fitted with folding doors
H1	755–904	Leyland LPTB70	Metro-Cammell	No.796 preserved (East Anglia Transport Museum)
J1	905–951	AEC 664T	Weymann	
J1	952	AEC 664T	Metro-Cammell	
M1	953	(Note: Unitary construction vehicles with AEC 664T running units)	Weymann	
L2	954		Metro-Cammell	
J2	955–1029	AEC 664T	BRCW	
J3	1030–1054	AEC 664T	BRCW	
K1	1055–1154	Leyland LPTB70	Leyland	
K2	1155–1254	Leyland LPTB70	Leyland	No.1201 preserved (East Anglia Transport Museum)
K1	1255–1304	Leyland LPTB70	Leyland	No.1253 preserved (London Transport Museum)
K2	1305–1354	Leyland LPTB70	Leyland	No.1348 preserved (Trolleybus Museum at Sandtoft)
L1	1355–1369		Metro-Cammell	
L2	1370–1378		Metro-Cammell	
X5	1379		Metro-Cammell	Experimental (modified class L2) with off-side doors to test the suitability of operating trolleybuses through the Kingsway tramway subway
L3	1380–1529		Metro-Cammell	No.1521 preserved (East Anglia Transport Museum)
M1	1530–1554		Weymann	
N1	1555–1644	AEC 664T	BRCW	
N2	1645–1669	AEC 664T	Park Royal	
X6	1670		English Electric	
X7	1671	(Note: Chassisless vehicle with Leyland running units)	Leyland	Tandem steering, single rear axle (dual wheels) drive; built as a Leyland demonstrator, February 1939, acquired September 1939
K3	1672–1696	Leyland LPTB70	Leyland	
P1	1697–1721	Leyland LPTB70	Metro-Cammell	
SA1	1722–1733	Leyland TTB5	Metro-Cammell	8'0" wide bodies
SA2	1734–1746	Leyland TTB5	Metro-Cammell	8'0" wide bodies
SA3	1747–1764	AEC 664T	Metro-Cammell	8'0" wide bodies
Q1	1765–1891	BUT 9641T	Metro-Cammell	8'0" wide bodies; No.1768 preserved (London Transport Museum); No.1812 preserved (Trolleybus Museum at Sandtoft)

== List of routes ==
At its peak, the network was the largest in the world, running 68 routes. The following is a list of the routes that were withdrawn in the replacement programme which ran from 1959 to 1962.

- 513: Hampstead Heath - Parliament Hill Fields
- 517: North Finchley - Holborn
- 521: Holborn - North Finchley
- 543: Holborn - Wood Green
- 555: Bloomsbury - Leyton
- 557: Chingford Mount - Liverpool Street
- 567: Barking - Smithfield
- 569: Aldgate - North Woolwich
- 581: Bloomsbury - Woodford
- 601: Twickenham - Tolworth
- 602: Dittons - Kingston loop
- 603: Tolworth - Kingston loop
- 604: Hampton Court Palace - Wimbledon
- 605: Teddington - Wimbledon
- 607: Uxbridge - Shepherd's Bush
- 609: Barnet - Highgate
- 609: Moorgate - Barnet
- 611: Highgate Village - Moorgate
- 613: Parliament Hill Fields - Holborn
- 615: Parliament Hill Fields - Moorgate
- 617: North Finchley - Holborn
- 621: Holborn - North Finchley
- 623: Woodford - Manor House
- 625: Woodford - Winchmore Hill
- 626: Acton - Clapham Junction
- 627: Waltham Cross - Tottenham Court Road
- 628: Craven Park - Clapham Junction
- 629: Enfield - Tottenham Court Road
- 630: Harlesden - West Croydon
- 639: Hampstead - Moorgate
- 641: Moorgate - Winchmore Hill
- 643: Holborn - Wood Green
- 645: Canons Park - Barnet
- 647: Stamford Hill - London Docks
- 649: Waltham Cross - Liverpool Street station
- 649A: Wood Green - Liverpool Street station
- 653: Aldgate - Tottenham Court Road
- 654: Sutton - Crystal Palace
- 655: Acton Vale - Clapham Junction
- 657: Hounslow - Shepherd's Bush
- 659: Waltham Cross - Holborn
- 660: North Finchley - Hammersmith
- 661: Aldgate - Leyton
- 662: Sudbury - Paddington Green
- 663: Aldgate - Chadwell Heath
- 665: Barking - Bloomsbury
- 666: Edgware - Hammersmith
- 667: Hammersmith - Hampton Court
- 669: North Woolwich - Stratford
- 677: Smithfield - West India Docks
- 679: Waltham Cross - Smithfield
- 685: North Woolwich - Walthamstow
- 687: Walthamstow - Royal Victoria and Albert docks
- 689: Stratford - East Ham circular via Plashet Grove & Green Street
- 690: Stratford - East Ham circular via Green Street & Plashet Grove
- 691: Barking - Barkingside
- 693: Barking - Chadwell Heath
- 696: Woolwich - Dartford
- 697: Chingford Mount - Docks
- 698: Woolwich - Bexleyheath
- 699: Chingford Mount - Docks

In July 1990, London Regional Transport introduced an express version of bus route 207 as route 607 between Uxbridge and Shepherd's Bush, mirroring the former trolleybus that carried the same number.

== Proposed revival ==
In 2012, it was proposed that a trolleybus based on the New Routemaster be introduced to address pollution concerns along Oxford Street.

== See also ==
- Buses in London
- Transport in London
- List of trolleybus systems in the United Kingdom
