= National Aircraft Factory No. 2 =

Coordinates: 53.4331°N 2.1884°W

National Aircraft Factory No. 2 (NAF No.2) was a First World War UK government owned aircraft factory located at Heaton Chapel, Stockport. It produced over 450 warplanes during 1918/19. The Heaton Chapel factory was then sold to Crossley Motors, who used it for building motor vehicles. In 1934, it was sold to the Fairey Aviation Company, with aircraft production there continuing until the late 1950s.

== Management ==
In 1917, the UK government decided to increase the country's aircraft production capacity by establishing 'National Aircraft Factories'. These were to be managed by large established industrial firms from outside the aircraft industry. NAF No.2 was created at Crossley Road, Heaton Chapel, next to the London & North Western Railway company's line between Manchester (London Road) station and Stockport (Edgeley) station. Crossley Motors had partially completed a factory to build aero-engines on the 15-acre (61,000 m^{2}) site and this was incorporated in a revised larger facility to be managed by the firm. The factory was completed in mid 1918.

== Aircraft production ==
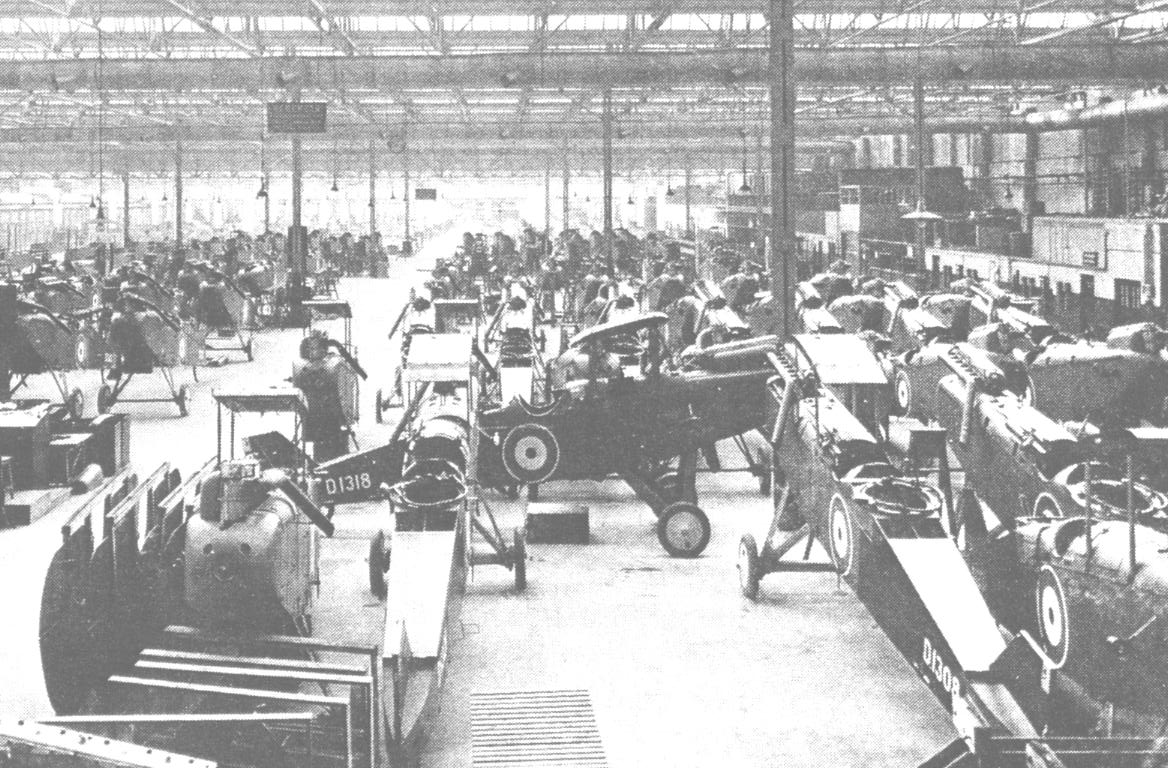
The erecting area of the National Aircraft Factory No.2 in late 1918 with de Havilland DH.9s under assembly

An initial production contract was received by NAF No.2 for 500 de Havilland DH.9 single-engined two-seat biplane day bombers for the Royal Air Force. The first DH.9 to be shipped from the Heaton Chapel factory was serial D1001 on 16 March 1918. A total of 444 DH.9s had been built when production ceased in spring 1919. Early production aircraft were despatched from NAF No.2 by rail, using the factory's adjacent LNWR sidings, to an Aircraft Acceptance Park at Coal Aston Aerodrome near Sheffield for final erection and testing. From May 1918 the DH.9s were transported in sections by rail or road to an Aircraft Acceptance Park at the newly opened Alexandra Park Aerodrome in Manchester where the aircraft were assembled and flight tested before delivery to the RAF. Some aircraft were also flown out of an airfield set up on the nearby Cringle Fields Park. The last 50 aircraft plus further NAF No.2 contracts for additional DH.9s were cancelled after the Armistice.

A further contract was received for the production of 200 de Havilland DH.10 Amiens twin-engined biplane day bombers. The first seven DH.10s (serials F351/357) were completed at NAF No.2, and test flown, from February 1919 onwards before the remaining machines on order were cancelled.

== Closure of NAF No.2 and subsequent use of factory buildings ==
After the cancellation of remaining orders for military aircraft, the factory was sold to Crossley Motors for the manufacture of cars and goods vehicles by Willys Overland Crossley, a joint venture between Crossley and the American Willys-Overland Motors. Motor vehicle production at Heaton Chapel ended in the early 1930s, and the Fairey Aviation Company of Hayes, Middlesex, needing more production capacity to fulfil large contracts for military aircraft, purchased the Heaton Chapel facilities in November 1934. In late 1935, the factory buildings were refurbished in preparation for aircraft production, and the first of a batch of thirteen Fairey Hendon bombers was completed in September 1936, being moved by road to Barton Aerodrome for flight testing. In 1937, production switched to the Fairey Battle bomber, and later that year flight test activities were moved to Ringway Airport (now Manchester Airport).

In 1940, a shadow factory was built next to Fairey's Heaton park factory. This new factory, known as Errwood Park, was also managed by Fairey. It built Bristol Beaufighter fighters and Handley Page Halifax bombers during the war. Aircraft production at the shadow factory was stopped shortly after the end of the war, and at the end of 1945, Errwood Park was leased by Crossley from the Board of Trade, being used to build buses.

Nearly 4,400 new aircraft were built at the two factories between 1936 and 1958.
