= Mancunian =

Mancunian is the associated adjective and demonym of Manchester, a city in North West England. It may refer to:

- Anything from or related to the city of Manchester or the county of Greater Manchester, in particular:
  - The people born in Manchester (see also List of people from Manchester)
  - The Manchester dialect of English
  - The Mancunion, a student newspaper published by University of Manchester Students' Union.
- Buses created primarily to the specifications of Manchester Corporation's transport department:
  - The Crossley Mancunian front-engine double-decker chassis of the 1930s
  - The rear-engine Mancunian double-decker bus bodywork on Leyland and Daimler chassis of the 1960s

== See also ==
- Manc (disambiguation)
- Mancunian Films
- Mancunian Way
- Mancunians RL, a rugby league and handball club
- Mancunian music
- 758 Mancunia, a minor planet
- Old Mancunian, a former pupil of Manchester Grammar School
