= East Anglia Transport Museum =

British open-air transport museum

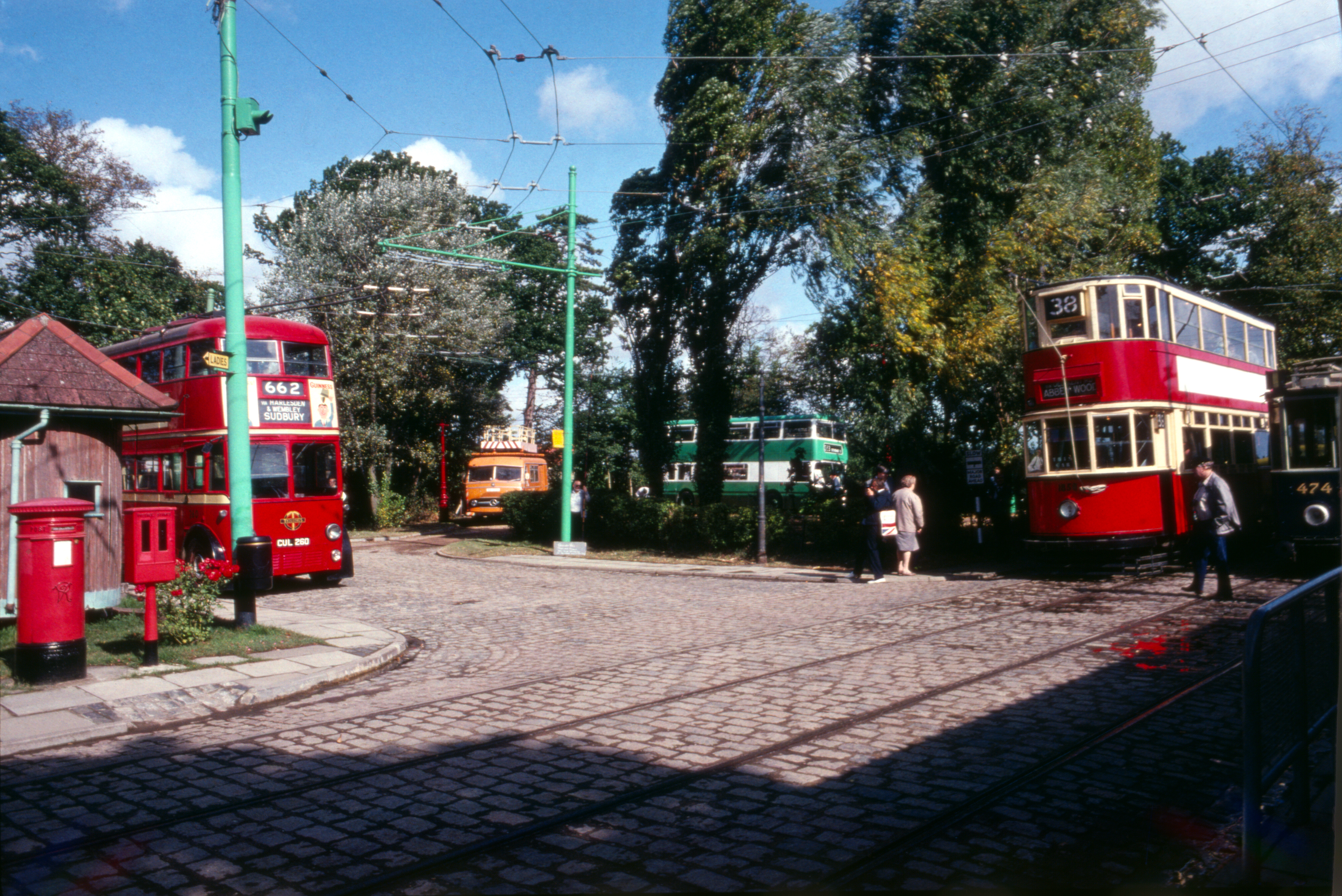
- Preserved former London (first generation) tram and trolleybus at the East Anglia Transport Museum

- Location within Suffolk
- Established: 1965
- Location: Carlton Colville, Lowestoft, Suffolk
- Coordinates: 52°27′09″N 1°41′10″E
- Type: Heritage centre
- Website: www.eatm.co.uk

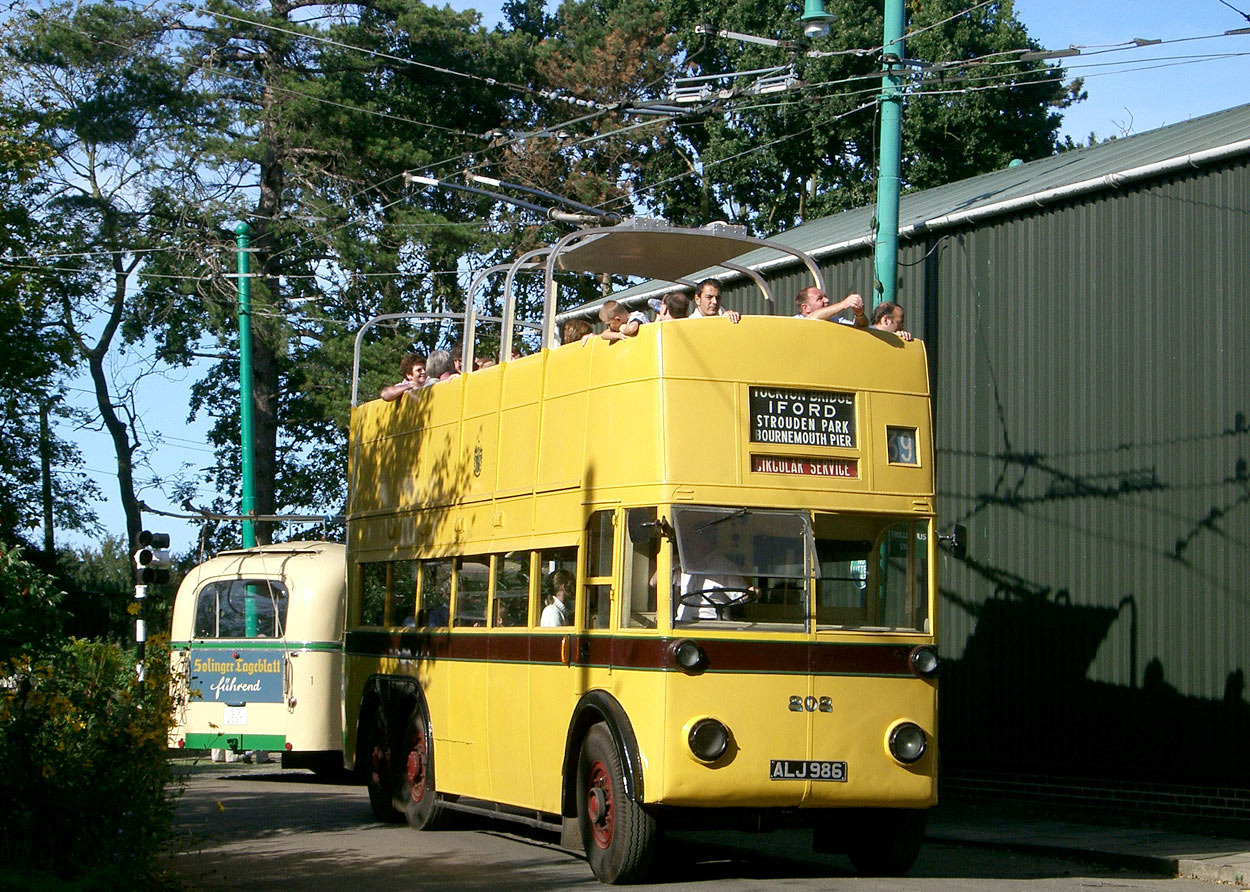
Former Bournemouth Corporation open-top trolleybus No. 202. Seen at the East Anglia Transport Museum, summer 2006. In the background is the rear of former Solingen, Germany trolleybus No. 1.

The East Anglia Transport Museum is an open-air transport museum, with numerous historic public transport vehicles (including many in full working order). It is located in Carlton Colville a suburb of Lowestoft, Suffolk. It is the only museum in the country where visitors can ride on buses, trams and trolleybuses, as well as a narrow-gauge railway.

== History ==
The museum was founded on its present site at Carlton Colville in 1965, following the rescue in 1962 by four enthusiasts of the body of an old Lowestoft tram (number 14), which had been used for a number of years as a summerhouse. The site was formerly a meadow, donated by the founder and first chairman of the Museum Society, Albert Bird. The first buildings on the site were constructed in 1966, and the museum opened to the public on 28 May 1972. Full tram and trolleybus operations began in 1981, following the construction of a suitable roadway.

The Museum's narrow-gauge railway, known as the East Suffolk Light Railway, opened in 1973. It was some 300 yards (270 m) long, running along the northern edge of the site, and the 2 ft (610 mm)-gauge track was constructed from materials obtained from a sand quarry at Leziate, from Canvey Island, and from the Southwold Railway. Signals were obtained from several locations in the vicinity. The museum also owns a van body which once ran on the Southwold Railway.

In 2016, the museum acquired some land adjacent to the main site. Waveney District Council granted planning permission for the museum to extend its site, as the museum was beneficial to the local economy. The plan was to lengthen the tramway, the trolleybus route and the narrow gauge railway, and to nearly double the site area, at an estimated cost of one million pounds. A new exhibition hall was to be built devoted to Eastern Coach Works, a major builder of bus and train bodywork in nearby Lowestoft until it closed in 1987. A new tram depot and trolleybus depot were to be built. Twenty vehicles in store at Ellough near Beccles were to be moved to the Carlton Colville site where they could be viewed.

The East Suffolk Light Railway, which originally terminated near the woodland tramway, was first extended, including construction of a flat crossing to allow the trains to pass over the tramway. In April 2023 the tram depot opened, with space for six tramcars, three in each lane. It accommodated the top deck of Glasgow 488, Brush cars 625 and 627, Double-deck Streamliner 726 and a stamping point for the museum's stamp trail.

== Exhibits ==
The museum has many exhibits ranging from a 1904 Lowestoft Corporation tram to a 1985 Sinclair C5. Tram rides are available on a route passing the museum's trolleybus depot and up to a terminus at Woodside. Originally, the trolleybus route extended as far as the trolleybus depot where passengers could change for a ride on the museum's 2 ft gauge railway to Chapel Road (the other end of the tram route), or they could stay on the trolleybus whilst it performed a 3-point turn and returned to the museum entrance via the same route.

A muddy field was sealed as the Back Road, and renamed as Herting Street, after the donor who supported these works. On 12 July 2008 a loop created along the Back Road, linking in with the existing overhead wiring near the museum's entrance, opened, Britain's first trolleybus extension for many decades.

Exhibits include No. 1521, the last trolleybus to operate under its own power in London, which had had the world's largest trolleybus network. It was one of a batch of 150 L3 class vehicles built on chassis made by Associated Equipment Company (AEC) and Metro Cammell Weymann in 1939–40, and made its last journey in the evening of 8 May 1962.

The following vehicles are displayed:

=== Trams ===
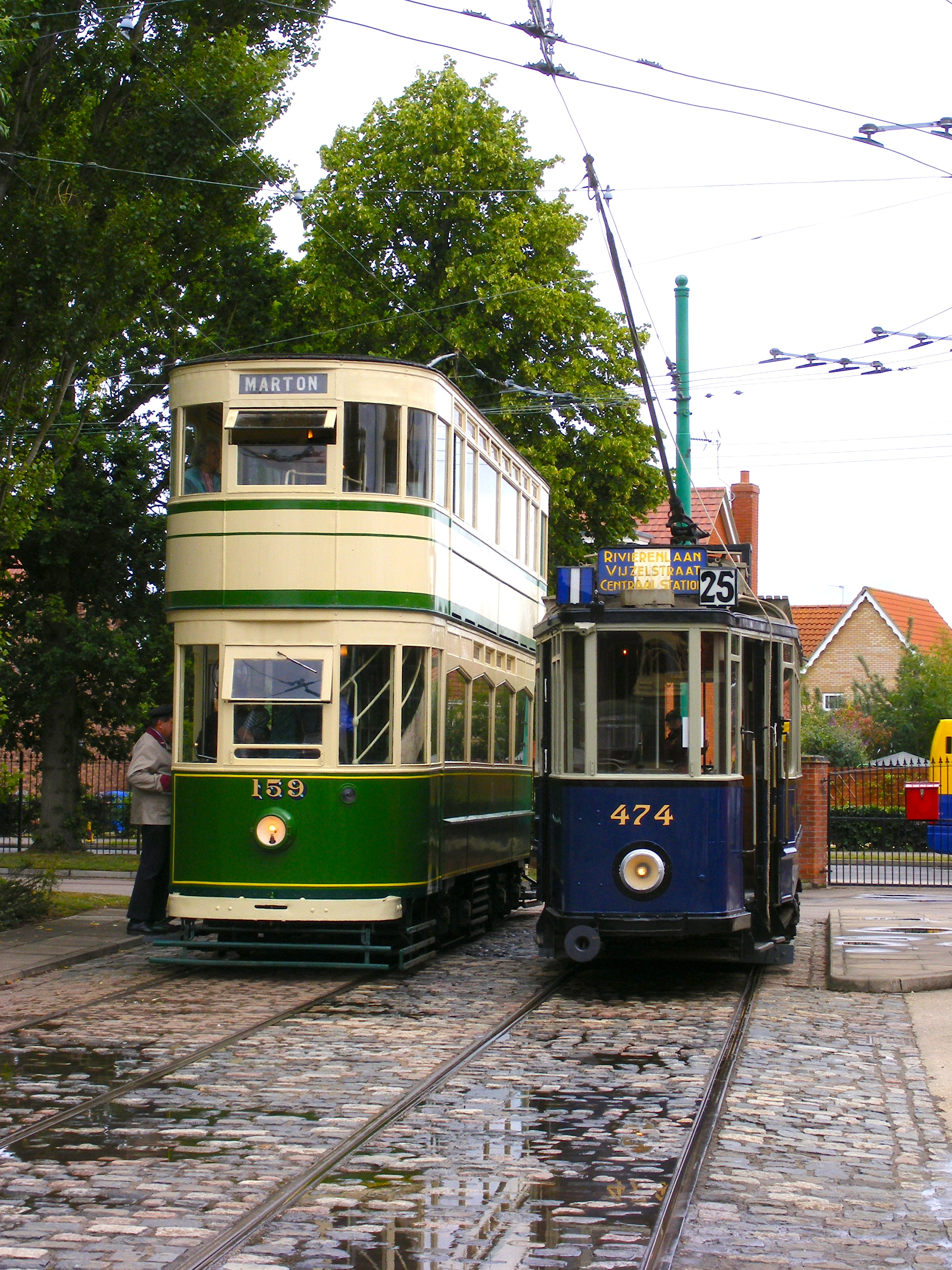
Blackpool Standard No. 159 and Amsterdam single decker No. 474 trams in service at the museum in 2009

- Blackpool Corporation VAMBAC enclosed single-decker No. 11 built in 1939. Operational.
- Lowestoft Corporation Tramways open topper No. 14 built in 1904. Undergoing restoration.
- Blackpool Corporation Standard Class enclosed double-decker No. 159 built in 1927. Operational.
- Amsterdam Tramways enclosed single decker No. 474 built in 1929. Operational.
- Glasgow Corporation Tramways enclosed double-decker No. 488 built in 1903. Undergoing restoration.
- Sheffield Corporation enclosed double-decker No. 513 built in 1950. Operational, on loan from Beamish Museum
- London Transport HR2 No. 1858 built in 1930. Operational.
- Blackpool Corporation Double Deck Streamliner “Balloon” No. 726 built in 1935. Awaiting restoration.
- Blackpool Corporation Brush Car No. 627 built in 1935.

Undergoing restoration.

- Blackpool Corporation Brush Car No. 625 built in 1935.

Not operational.

=== Trolleybuses ===
- 1 Henschel Solingen (privately owned)
- 5 Garrett 1926 Copenhagen
- 34 Sunbeam 1947 Hastings Corporation
- 52 BUT 9611T 1953 Maidstone Corporation Transport
- 87 BUT 9612T 1956 Ashton-Under-Lyne Corporation
- 202 Sunbeam 1935 Bournemouth Corporation
- 224 Sunbeam 1953 Derby Corporation (away from museum undergoing restoration)
- 237 Sunbeam 1960 Derby Corporation (Privately Owned)
- 246 Sunbeam 1958 Belfast Corporation
- 260 AEC 1936 London Transport
- 286 Sunbeam 1959 Bournemouth Corporation
- 313 BUT 1951 Portsmouth Corporation
- 628 BUT 1950 Newcastle Corporation
- 1201 Leyland 1938 London Transport
- 1521 Chassisless Construction by Metro-Cammell using AEC components 1940 London Transport
- 578 Nottingham City Transport built in 1951.
- 105 Ipswich Corporation built in 1948. (On loan from Ipswich Transport Museum)

=== Motorbuses ===
- 21 AEC Regent II 1947 Lowestoft Corporation
- LL408 Bristol 1948 Eastern Counties
- LFL57 Bristol Lodekka 1962 Eastern Counties
- 4 AEC Swift 1969 Lowestoft corporation
- 85 AEC Reliance 1964 Great Yarmouth
- VR385 Bristol VR 1972 Eastern Counties
- 13 Mercedes-Benz 608D 1987 Lincolnshire Road Car
- 66 Leyland PD2/1 1949 Great Yarmouth Corporation
- 62 Dennis Dart 1995 Great Yarmouth Transport
- 8 AEC Regent V 1963 Lowestoft Corporation
- RTL 1163 1946 London Transport
- RT 3125 1950 London Country

=== Locomotives ===
There are four locomotives which operate on the 2 ft (610 mm) gauge East Suffolk Light Railway (ESLR). All of them have four-wheel chassis, with diesel engines and mechanical transmission. One was made by Ruston and Hornsby of Lincoln and three were made by Motor Rail of Bedford. The frames of a fourth Motor Rail locomotive were used to form the chassis of a brakevan.

Number	Name	Type	Manufacturer	Makers No.	Built	History
2	Aldburgh	4wDM	Motor Rail	5912	1934	British Industrial Sands, King's Lynn
4	Leiston	4wDM	Ruston & Hornsby	177604	1936	Portland Cement, Lewes
No.5	Orfordness	4wDM	Motor Rail	22211	1964	Delivered to East Suffolk and Norfolk River Authority. Moved to the Department of the Environment in 1969. 1991-1997 loaned to the Imperial War Museum, Duxford. Permanently loaned to ESLR in 1997.
No.6	Thorpness	4wDM	Motor Rail	22209	1964	Delivered to East Suffolk and Norfolk River Authority. Moved to the Department of the Environment in 1969. 1991-1997 loaned to the Imperial War Museum, Duxford. Permanently loaned to ESLR in 1997.

== See also ==
- List of transport museums
- List of trolleybus systems in the United Kingdom
- The Trolleybus Museum at Sandtoft
- Black Country Living Museum - also with trolleybuses and trams

== Gallery ==
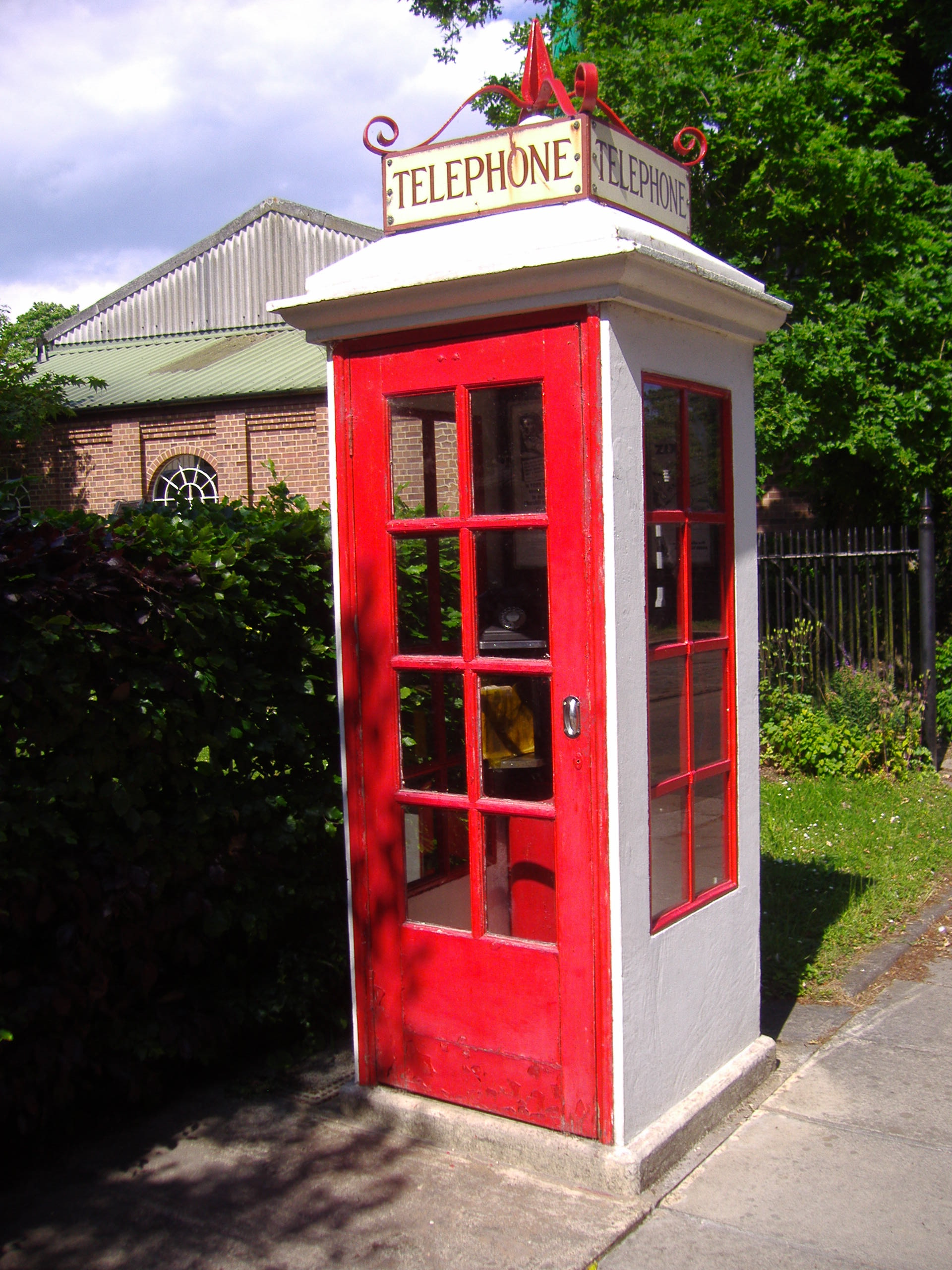
K1 Telephone Box, Lowestoft Transport Museum

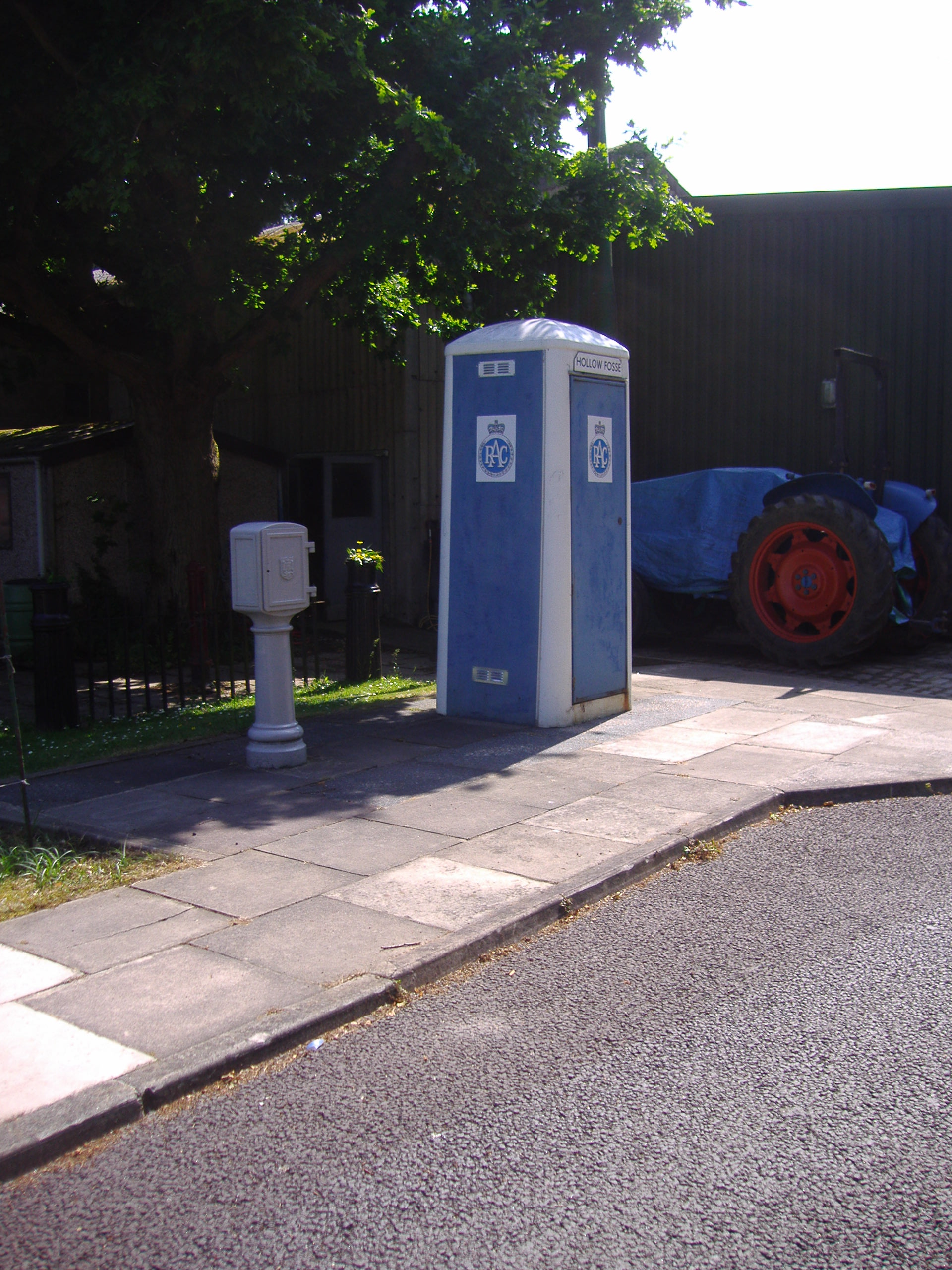
RAC roadside Telephonebox

== Bibliography ==
- Butcher, Alan C, ed. (2009). Railways Restored. Ian Allan Publishing. ISBN 978-0-7110-3370-2.
- Chapman, Thomas (13 June 2018). "Transport museum given go-ahead for million pound expansion". Lowestoft Journal. Archived from the original on 18 July 2018.
- Handbook (2012). Industrial Locomotives (16EL). Industrial Railway Society. ISBN 978-1-901556-78-0.
- Joyce, J; King, J S; Newman, A G (1986). British Trolleybus Systems. London: Ian Allan Publishing. ISBN 978-0-7110-1647-7.
- Lockwood, Stephen (2011). Trackless to Trolleybus: Trolleybuses in Britain. Adam Gordon. ISBN 978-1-874422-86-0.
- Major, Tim (12 June 2018). "Planning Application" (PDF). East Suffolk Council. Archived (PDF) from the original on 2 June 2020.
- Prior, Gareth (17 April 2019). "Work gets underway on expansion of East Anglia Transport Museum". British Trams Online. Archived from the original on 2 June 2020.
