= BUT 9613T =

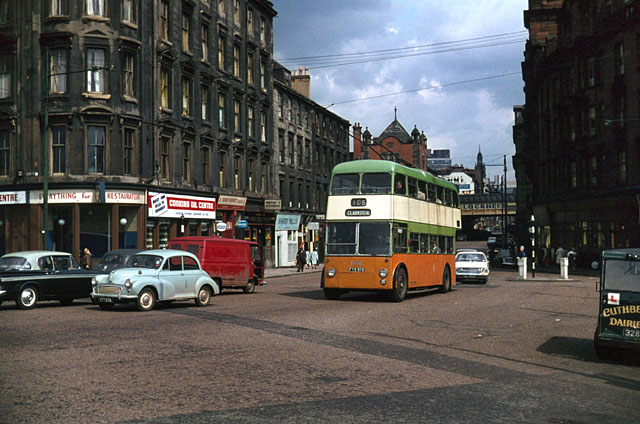
- BUT 9613T trolleybus in Glasgow in 1967

Overview
- Manufacturer: British United Traction
- Production: 1957/58
- Assembly: Stockport

Body and chassis
- Doors: 1

Dimensions
- Length: 30 ft (9.1 m)

Chronology
- Predecessor: BUT 9612T

The BUT 9613T was a two-axle double-deck trolleybus chassis manufactured by British United Traction in 1957/58. It was an extended wheelbase version of the BUT 9612T. A total of 90 were manufactured at the Crossley Motors' Stockport factory, all for Glasgow.

A single example is preserved in the UK at the Trolleybus Museum at Sandtoft in Yorkshire.
