= WOC =

WOC may refer to:

- Homogeneous water oxidation catalysis
- WAN Optimization Controller
- William Orcutt Cushing, American hymn writer
- Willys Overland Crossley, a British vehicle manufacturer active between 1919 and 1934
- Wolli Creek railway station, Sydney, Australia, by station code
- Women of color, a term used to collectively describe women who are not white; see Person of color
- Wonders of Chiropractic, former slogan of Palmer College of Chiropractic and the namesake for the WOC broadcasting stations in Davenport, Iowa, United States
  - WOC (AM), a radio station (1420 AM) licensed to Davenport, Iowa, United States
  - WLLR-FM, a radio station (103.7 FM) licensed to Davenport, Iowa, United States, which held the call sign WOC-FM from October 1948 to February 1972
  - KWQC-TV, a television station (channel 36 digital/6 virtual) licensed to Davenport, Iowa, United States, which held the call sign WOC-TV from October 1949 to December 1986
- The World of Cars Online
- World of Coca-Cola
- World of Color, a nighttime show at Disney California Adventure Park
- World Orienteering Championships
