= Manc =

Manc or MANC may refer to:

- Something pertaining to the city of Manchester, in North West England
  - The Manchester dialect, or Manc accent, spoken in Manchester and outlying areas
  - ManC (magazine), a magazine about Manchester City F.C.
- The MidAmerica Nazarene University, sometimes abbreviated to MANC
- The Cameroonian National Action Movement, known by its French acronym MANC

== See also ==
- Mancunian (disambiguation)
- Mank (disambiguation)
