= BUT 9611T =

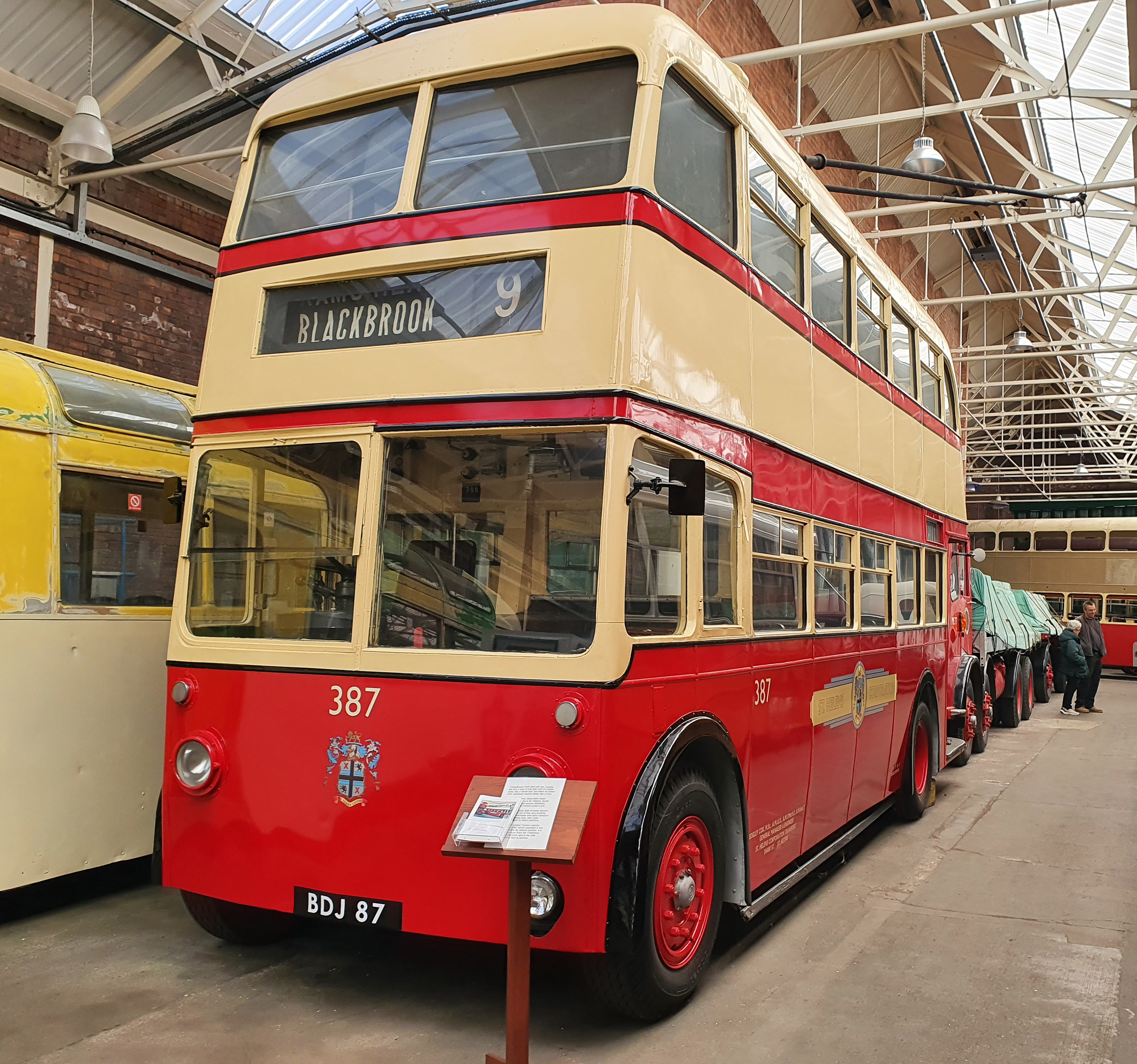
- BUT 9611T trolleybus at the North West Museum of Road Transport in October 2022

Overview
- Manufacturer: British United Traction
- Production: 1947 - 1951
- Assembly: Ham; Southall

Body and chassis
- Doors: 1
- Related: AEC Regent III

Dimensions
- Length: 26 ft (7.9 m)

Chronology
- Successor: BUT 9612T

The BUT 9611T was a two-axle double deck trolleybus chassis manufactured by British United Traction between 1947 and 1951. It was based on the AEC Regent III bus chassis, with a total of 138 manufactured at Leyland's Ham and AEC's Southall factories for 11 operators in England. The largest orders were for Newcastle (25), Bradford (20) and Reading (20).

As of 2024, around thirteen 9611T trolleybuses are preserved in the UK, including several at the Trolleybus Museum at Sandtoft in Yorkshire.
