= Mank (disambiguation) =

Mank may refer to:

== People ==
- Judith Mank (born 1976), American-British-Canadian zoologist
- Randolph Mank (born 1954), Canadian business executive and ambassador

== Others ==
- Mank (film), 2020 American biographical drama film
  - Mank (soundtrack), score album of this film
- Mank, Austria, town in the district of Melk in the state of Lower Austria

== See also ==
- Manx (disambiguation), including uses sometimes spelled "Manks"
- Manc (disambiguation)
