= BUT 9612T =

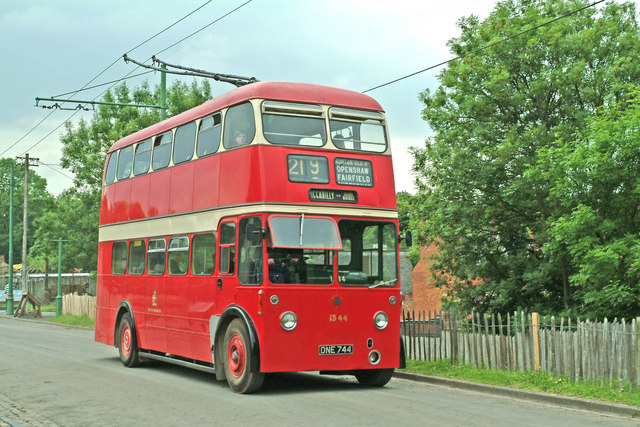
- Preserved BUT 9612T at the Black Country Living Museum in 2008

Overview
- Manufacturer: British United Traction
- Production: 1955/56
- Assembly: Stockport

Body and chassis
- Doors: 1

Dimensions
- Length: 27 ft (8.2 m)

Chronology
- Predecessor: BUT 9611T
- Successor: BUT 9613T

The BUT 9612T was a two-axle double deck trolleybus chassis manufactured by British United Traction in 1955/56. It was a longer wheelbase version of the BUT 9611T. A total of 70 were manufactured by Crossley Motors' Stockport factory; 62 for Manchester and eight for Ashton.

As of 2024, two 9612Ts are preserved, one from Manchester and the other from the Ashton fleet.
