= Crossley 20/25 HP =

British touring car (1912 to 1920)

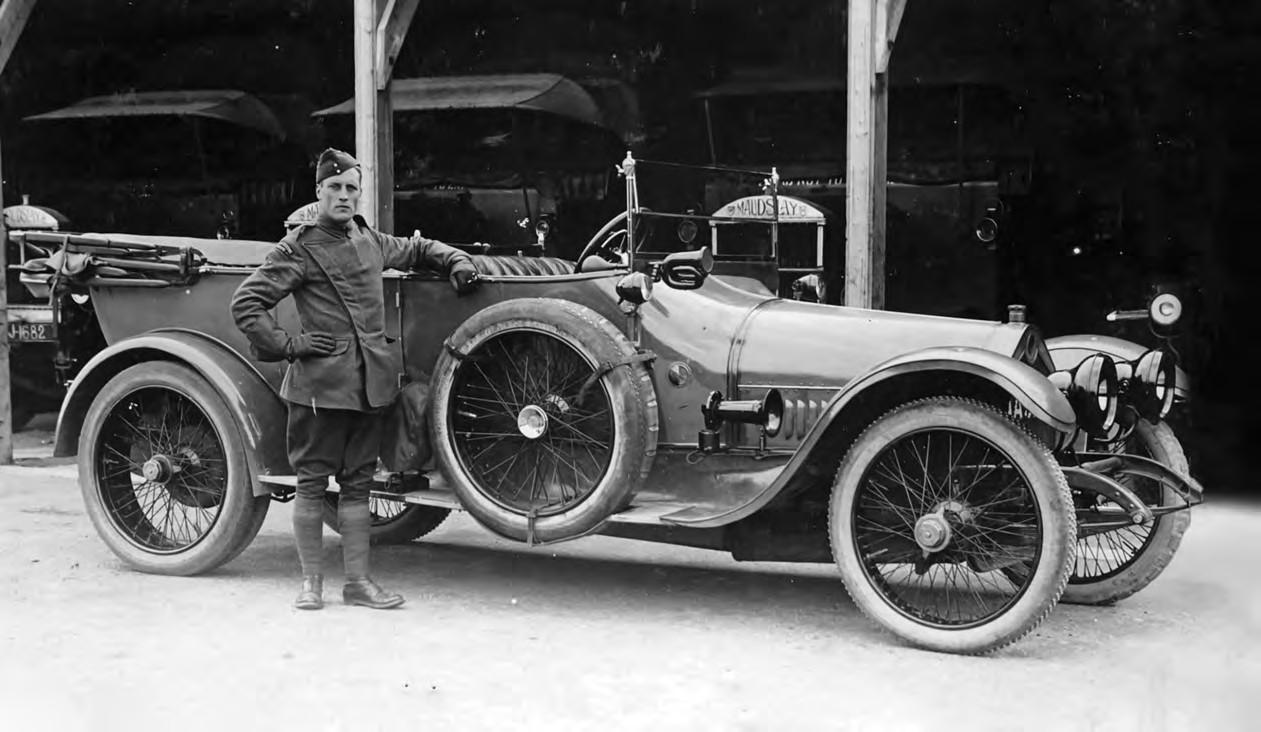
- Crossley 20/25 HP staff car of the Royal Flying Corps

Overview
- Manufacturer: Crossley Motors
- Also called: Crossley RFC Type
- Production: 1912–1920
- Designer: A. W. Reeves

Body and chassis
- Layout: Front-engine, rear-wheel-drive

Powertrain
- Engine: Crossley 4,487 cc (274 cu in) inline-4 side valve 44 or 50 bhp (33 or 37 kW)
- Transmission: 4-speed

Dimensions
- Wheelbase: 10 ft 6 in (3.20 m) / 11 ft 3 in (3.43 m)
- Length: 14 ft 9 3/4 in (4.51 m)

Chronology
- Predecessor: 20 HP
- Successor: 25/30 HP

The Crossley 20/25 HP was a British touring car produced by the Crossley Motors. Introduced in 1912, the 20/25 HP was a development of the company's earlier 20 HP and remained in production until 1920.

The 20/25 HP was used extensively by the Royal Flying Corps and the flying corps of the British Empire during the First World War. Over 6,000 were in military service at the time of the Armistice.

== Design ==
The Crossley 20/25 HP was a front-engine, rear-wheel-drive luxury touring car. Pre-war versions of the 20/25 HP were between 14 ft 3/4 in (4.29 m) and 14 ft 9 3/4 in (4.51 m) in length, with a 10 ft 6 in (3.20 m) wheelbase. Military versions had a 11 ft 3 in (3.43 m) wheelbase, and weighed between 36 and 41 long cwt (1.83 and 2.08 t).

The 20/25 HP was powered by a 4,487 cc (274 cu in) Crossley straight-four side valve petrol engine. The engine had a bore and stroke of 4 in × 6 in (102 mm × 140 mm), various sources claim it developed either 44 or 50 bhp (33 or 37 kW). The 20/25 HP was driven through a 4-forward, 1 reverse manual transmission and was fitted with a cone clutch, it could attain a top speed of 55 mph (89 km/h).

== History ==
At the end of 1908, Crossley introduced a new car model, the 20 HP, which was designed by A. W. Reeves. In 1912 Crossley introduced an upgraded model the 20/25 HP, which was effectively the 20 HP with a 4,487 cc (274 cu in) side valve engine. Both models proved popular, and Crossley had produced over 2,000 20 HPs and 20/25 HPs by the time Britain entered the First World War in August 1914.

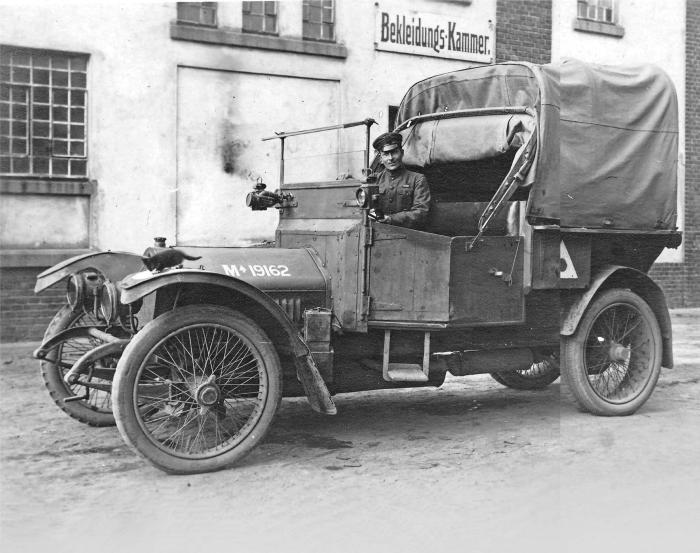
Crossley 20/25 HP light tender of the Royal Flying Corps.

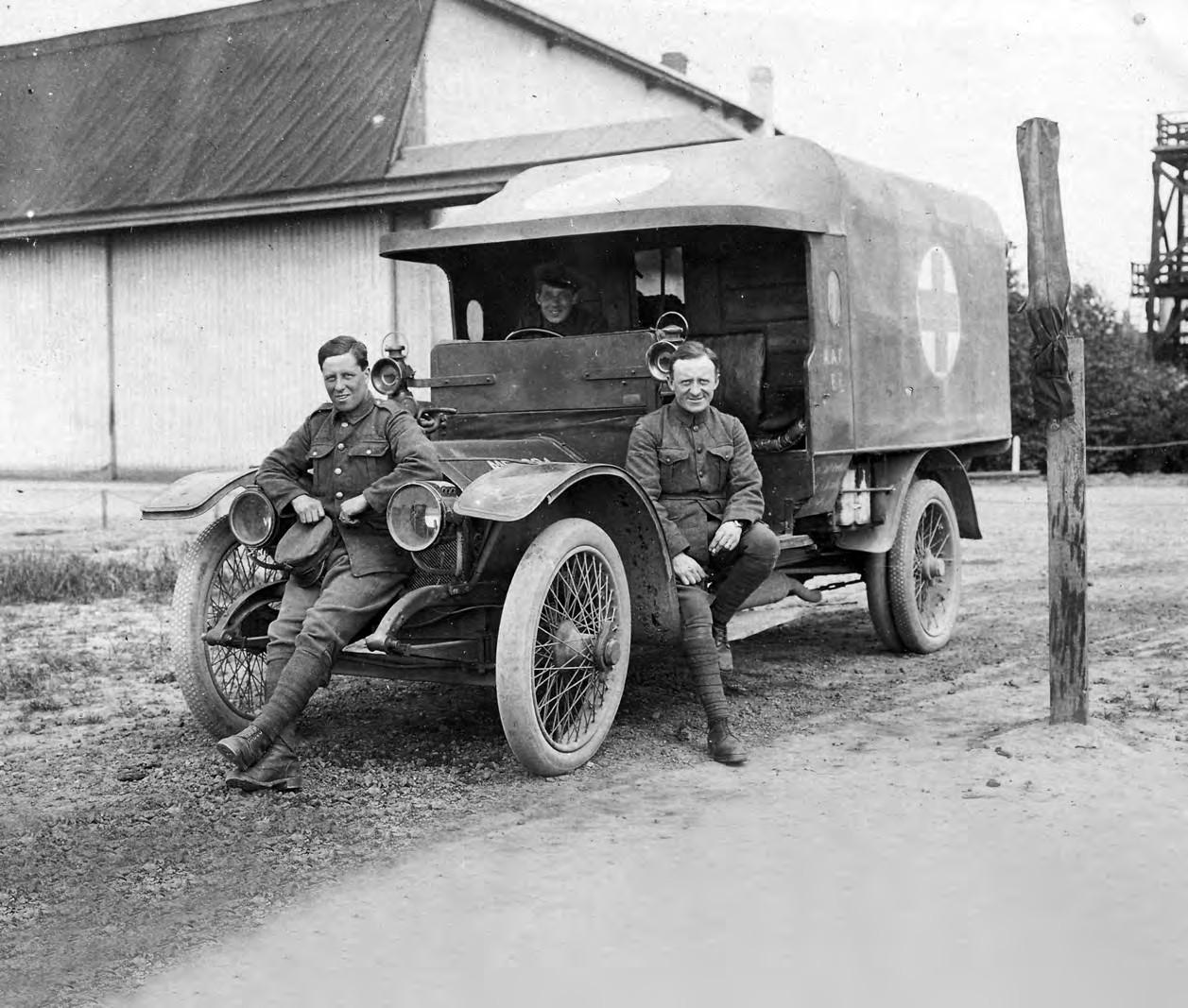
Crossley 20/25 HP ambulance of the Royal Flying Corps.

Early on, the British War Office showed interest in the 20/25 HP, placing an order for six tourers in early 1913 for service with the Royal Flying Corps. By January 1914 the number of 20/25s in British military service had grown to 89, at least one of which was equipped as an ambulance capable of carrying two patents. With the outbreak of the First World War, the Royal Flying Corps adopted the 20/25 HP as their official staff car. For military service, the 20/25 HP's chassis was slightly modified with strengthened springs and dual rear wheels. Assessing the effectiveness of operating a single chassis type, in addition to the staff car and ambulance the Royal Flying Corps had Crossley adapt the chassis to produce 15-cwt (3/4 long ton, 0.76 tonne) light trucks (called a light tender). During the war the light tender was by far the most numerous version, in lieu of stores it could carry eleven personnel including a driver, three on the front bench seat and eight on bench seats in the rear. The staff car was the second most numerous version and was equipped with four seats. The ambulance was never produced in great numbers.

The Crossley 20/25 HP was operated almost exclusively by the various Flying Corps of the British Empire during the war, although small numbers of light tenders were also operated by the Royal Naval Air Service. By 1916, standard issue was eleven light tenders, two staff cars and one ambulance per squadron. By the end of the war over 6,000 20/25 HPs had been purchased by the War Office.

After the war large numbers of 20/25s were sold off to the public, although some remained in Royal Air Force service until around 1930. The 20/25 HP remained in production until 1920, in 1919 it was also supplemented in the Crossley lineup by the 25/30 HP, which featured an updated "bullnose" V-shaped radiator and a 4,950 cc (302 cu in) engine. Post-war some ex-military 20/25 HPs were repurchased by Crossley and reconditioned for resale, others were purchased by third parties and reconditioned for sale. When fitted new bodies and the new bullnose radiator, a reconditioned 20/25 HP was barely distinguishable from a new built 25/30 HP, and could be purchased for up to £600 less than the newer model.

It is believed there are about ten remaining 20/25 HPs that served in the First World War, four light tenders, two staff cars, and four post-war conversions to other versions.
