= Watford Junction Motive Power Depot =

Former railway maintenance depot in Watford, Hertfordshire

- Interactive map of Watford Junction Motive Power Depot

Location
- Location: Watford, Hertfordshire
- Coordinates: 51.6655°N 0.3975°W
- OS grid: TQ109975

Characteristics
- Owner: British Rail
- Depot code: WJ (1973 -)
- Type: Diesel

History
- Opened: 1856
- Closed: 1965

Watford Junction Motive Power Depot was a traction maintenance depot located in Watford, Hertfordshire, England. The depot was situated on the Watford DC line and was near Watford Junction station.

The depot code was WJ.

== History ==
From 1960 to 1965, when the depot closed, Class 08 shunters, Class 11 and 24 locomotives could be seen at the depot.
