= Manchester City F.C. media =

Manchester City F.C media website

Manchester City F.C. media is website of Manchester City F.C that gives vital pieces of information about the club.

== Overview ==
The club's website, mcfc.co.uk, was relaunched in July 2009. Unlike the majority of other football club websites, the site does not feature adverts. The website was designed by Poke, and a number of awards since its relaunch.

On 17 July 2013, the club announced the release of ten new websites (effectively just domains of the main website), which would duplicate the content of the club's main website but in a variety of other languages, particularly Oriental in origin. Combined with the previous release of Arabic- and Mandarin-language websites, this makes mcfc.co.uk the website with the broadest global reach of all football websites, serving the official languages to 160 countries and therefore readable by approximately 80% of the world's population.

== Magazine ==
ManC
- Editor: David Clayton
- Categories: Sport - Football
- Frequency: Monthly
- Publisher: Cre8 Publishing
- First issue: In current format 4 August 2010
- Country: England, U.K.
- Based in: Manchester
- Language: English
- Website: Publisher
- ISSN: 1359-3749

ManC (previously known as City) is the official magazine of the English football club Manchester City.

=== City magazine ===
The magazine was known as City for a number of years. The magazine was retailed at £2.50 but format was phased out in favour of new, updated and larger magazine format in August 2010.

=== ManC ===
The new format was called ManC and was launched on the 4 August 2010. The new magazine is published by Cre8 publishing who also produce the Manchester City matchday programmes and the magazine pagination was increased by 33% from 66 pages to 100 and to make up for production the price was increased by one pound, to make the magazine £3.50.

Some of the current features in the new 2010 format include:

- Tricks of the trade: A Manchester City demonstrates how to perform a certain skill
- #SocialCity: Features City fans with views and contributions on official Twitter, Facebook and Flickr sites
- FAN V PLAYER: A chosen fan answers 10 general knowledge questions against a City player
- InsidetheInjury: Features club doctor Jamie Butler explaining a specific footballing injury
- LocationMCR: Feature about a specific place or area special to Manchester City fans such as The Kippax
- Q&A: An eight-page feature with a player each month answering questions sent in by fans
