= Trolleybuses in Newcastle upon Tyne =

Newcastle upon Tyne trolleybus system
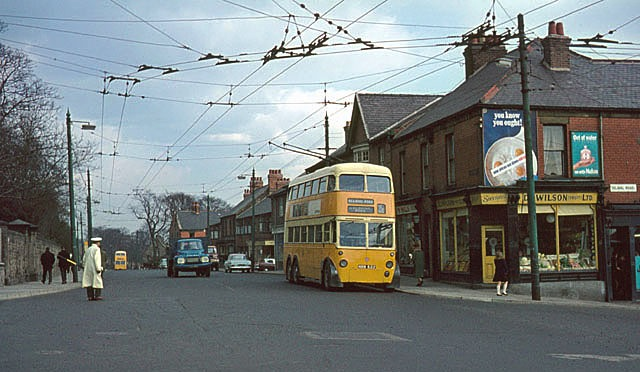
- Newcastle trolleybus at the Delaval Road terminus, Benwell, June 1966

Operation
- Locale: Newcastle upon Tyne, United Kingdom
- Open: 2 October 1935
- Close: 2 October 1966
- Status: Closed
- Routes: 15
- Owner: Newcastle Corporation Transport
- Operator: Newcastle Corporation Transport

Infrastructure
- Electrification: V DC parallel overhead lines
- Depots: Byker depot; Slatyford depot (from 1956)

The Newcastle upon Tyne trolleybus system once served Newcastle upon Tyne and surrounding areas in England. Opened in 1935, it gradually replaced the Newcastle tram network.

By the standards of the various now-defunct trolleybus systems in the United Kingdom, the Newcastle system was a large one, with a total of 28 routes, and a maximum fleet of 204 trolleybuses. It closed on 2 October 1966.

Two of the distinctive yellow-liveried former Newcastle trolleybuses are now preserved, one at the East Anglia Transport Museum at Carlton Colville, Suffolk, and the other LTN 501 at Beamish Open Air Museum sometimes on loan to The Trolleybus Museum at Sandtoft, Lincolnshire.

== See also ==
- Transport in Tyne and Wear
- List of trolleybus systems in the United Kingdom
