= Associated Commercial Vehicles =

British holding company

- Company type: Holding company
- Industry: Automotive
- Founded: 1 October 1948
- Subsidiaries: AEC; Charles H Roe; Crossley Motors; Maudslay Motor Company; Park Royal Vehicles; Thornycroft

Associated Commercial Vehicles (ACV) was a holding company formed on 1 October 1948 when Associated Equipment Company purchased Crossley Motors and Maudslay Motor Company. In 1949 ACV took control of coachbuilding firm Park Royal Vehicles, along with its subsidiary Charles H. Roe, followed in 1961 by Thornycroft. In 1962, ACV was purchased by Leyland Motors
