= Crossley Mancunian =

The Crossley Mancunian was a commercial vehicle chassis produced by Crossley Motors from 1934 until 1941. It was of the front-engine, rear-wheel-drive layout with forward control, sold as a bare chassis including engine, transmission and driving controls, and was intended to be fitted with double deck bodywork built either by Crossley or by an outside coachbuilder.

Crossley Motors had produced rolling chassis suitable for buses since 1928, and the principal models of the early 1930s were the Alpha and Condor, intended for single- and double-deck bodywork respectively. Crossley had also been manufacturing diesel engines (also known as oil engines) from 1930, which were available as an option on the Alpha and Condor models. Crossley's factories were in and around Manchester, and Manchester Corporation had a policy to support local industry – hence, Crossley's biggest customer for its bus chassis was Manchester Corporation Transport (MCT).

In the early 1930s, MCT produced a double-deck bus chassis specification, and to satisfy that, Crossley developed the Mancunian chassis. This used a new version of their oil engine, utilising a Ricardo Comet cylinder head, and having a displacement of 8.367 litres (510.6 cu in); other changes from the design of the Condor included the gearbox, which was fitted to the rear of the engine instead of part-way along the chassis. The Mancunian was launched in 1934, and having provided the specification the principal customer was therefore MCT, which took well over 400. Other customers bought far fewer, and included Ashton-under-Lyne Corporation (which took 18), Maidstone Corporation (12), Northampton Corporation (11), Warrington Corporation (11), Salford Corporation (9) and Oldham Corporation (6). Several other towns bought one or two each.

Production ended in 1941, by which time a little over 500 had been built – about seventy that were on order (mainly for MCT) at the outbreak of war were subsequently cancelled. In addition, 22 of the Crossley Alpha single-deck chassis (twenty for MCT in 1937 and two for Sunderland Corporation in 1939) were badged as Mancunians since they were equipped with the same engine and transmission.

== Sources ==
- "Crossley Mancunian". Bus Lists on the Web. 25 August 2024.
- Aldridge, John (1995). British Buses Before 1945. Ian Allan Transport Library. Shepperton: Ian Allan. pp. 62–63. ISBN 0-7110-2279-8.
- Wise, G.B. (1989). Bus & Coach Recognition: Veteran & Vintage. Shepperton: Ian Allan. pp. 84–85. ISBN 0-7110-1858-8.
