= Trolleybuses in Grimsby =

Grimsby trolleybus system
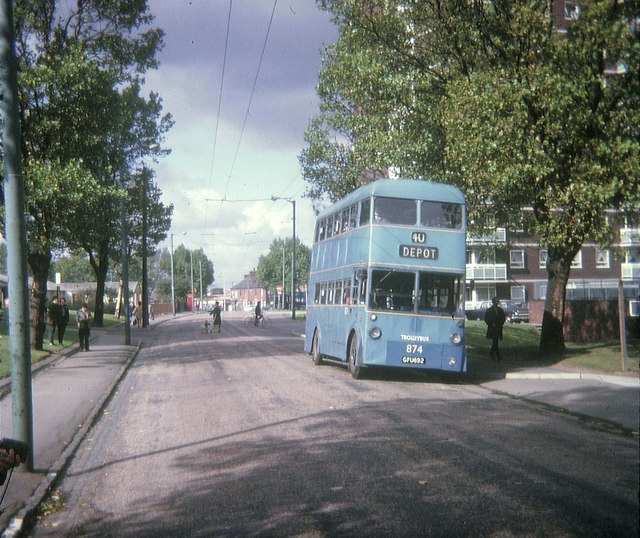
- Former Grimsby/Cleethorpes trolleybus 159 working in Walsall, October 1970

Operation
- Locale: Grimsby, Lincolnshire, England
- Open: 3 October 1926
- Close: 4 June 1960
- Status: Closed
- Routes: 2
- Operator: Grimsby Corporation Transport

Infrastructure
- Stock: 19 (maximum)

The Grimsby trolleybus system once served the seaport of Grimsby, in Lincolnshire, England. Opened on 3 October 1926, it gradually replaced part of the Great Grimsby Street Tramways, a tramway that had served both Grimsby and the neighbouring holiday resort of Cleethorpes. It was closed on 4 June 1960.

By the standards of the various now defunct trolleybus systems in the United Kingdom, the Grimsby system was a small one, with a total of only two routes, and a maximum fleet of just 19 trolleybuses.

== History ==
A horse tramway had been opened in Grimsby in 1881, and had been extended into neighbouring Cleethorpes in 1887. This had been converted to an electric tramway in 1901, at a time when legislation prevented Corporations from operating their own tramways. However, the provisions of the Tramways Act 1870 (33 & 34 Vict. c. 78) meant that the Corporation had the option to buy the system within its own boundaries after 21 years, and they exercised this right on 21 July 1922. Negotiations were protracted, and they finally paid £109,848 for the major part of the Great Grimsby Street Tramways network on 6 April 1925. The system was in a poor state of repair, and the route southwards from Riby Square to Freeman Street and Hainton Avenue was in urgent need of renewal.

Two months after taking over the tramway, a meeting was held on 5 June 1925, at which options were considered. Replacement of the tramway track was estimated to cost £20,000, while conversion of the overhead wiring for trolleybuses was costed at £12,375. They decided to proceed with the trolleybus option, and the route was extended at its southern end to Weelsby Road. In order to provide the service, they bought five trolleybuses from Richard Garrett & Sons of Leiston, Suffolk. These were single deck vehicles with a centre entrance, pneumatic tyres, and seating for just 22 passengers. The trams ran until 2 October 1926, and the trolleybuses took over from the following day, with no fares being charged on the first day. Demand for the service was sufficient that two more vehicles were acquired in early 1927. Because there was only a single overhead wire between Riby Square and the tram depot in Victoria Street, the trolleybuses were provided with a skate, that allowed them to use one trolley boom on the tram wire and the skate to complete the circuit through the tram tracks, in order to reach the depot.

Following the success of this first route, plans were made for several routes beyond the tramway, principally to the south west of Grimsby, connecting to the Weelsby Road terminus and the Old Market Place, as well as a loop around Grimsby, running along Cleethorpes Road, Victor Street, Wellington Street, South Durban Street and Eleanor Street. None of these came to fruition, as the Corporation began running motorbuses in 1927, and these required less investment in infrastructure.

After Grimsby Corporation had bought their part of the tramway, they had continued to work with Great Grimsby Street Tramways running the joint service between Grimsby and Cleethorpes. Meanwhile, Cleethorpes had applied for permission to run their part of the tramway and to then convert it to trolleybuses in the Cleethorpes Urban District Council Act 1928 (18 & 19 Geo. 5. c. lxxvi). In 1932 the two towns agreed that if Cleethorpes replaced its part of the tramway with trolleybuses, Grimsby would do the same, and by 1935, Grimsby were ready to proceed. They ordered ten new three-axle double deck trolleybuses with centre entrances from Associated Equipment Company (AEC) in 1936, and Cleethorpes paid £50,000 for the remainder of the Great Grimsby Street Tramways, taking over from 15 July 1936.

Grimsby's second trolleybus service began on 22 November 1936, running from Old Market Place to the borough boundary at Park Street. For nearly eight months, both trams and trolleybuses operated on the Riby Square to Park Street section, as the through tram service continued until Cleethorpes had installed their trolleybus wiring. The final trams ran on 17 July 1937, and the new joint trolleybus service between the towns began on the following day. At the Cleethorpes end, the new route ran for a short distance beyond the Kingsway tram terminus to a turning loop at Bathing Pool. Cleethorpes ran their part of the joint service with vehicles also made by AEC, but unlike the Grimsby examples, they had two axles and rear entrances.

=== Demise ===
The trolleybus fleet was expanded by the purchase of three Karrier vehicles in 1944 and another six in 1947. In 1955, trolleybuses on the original Riby Square to Weelsby Road route were temporarily replaced by motor buses. This was intended to be for an experimental period of three months, but the change was made permanent on1 October 1955, leaving just the Grimsby to Cleethorpes route. With both undertakings being so small, discussions about amalgamating them had taken place intermittently for years, until on 1 January 1957 Grimsby-Cleethorpes Transport was created, controlled by a committee with representatives from both corporations. Cleethorpes vehicles had 100 added to their fleet numbers and were transferred to the Grimsby Depot, enabling the Cleethorpes Depot at Pelham Road to be closed on 2 March 1957. Sunday services were discontinued from September 1958, and in October 1959 a report was produced advocating that the system be abandoned. This was ratified by both Corporations in November, and the final day of trolleybus operation was 4 June 1960.

Some of Grimsby's Karrier trolleybuses were sold to Bradford, but do not appear to have been used in public service there. the Walsall system bought several of the Cleethorpes vehicles, where they continued to operate until the closure of that system in 1970. Two of the former Grimsby/Cleethorpes trolleybuses are recorded as having survived.

== Fleet ==
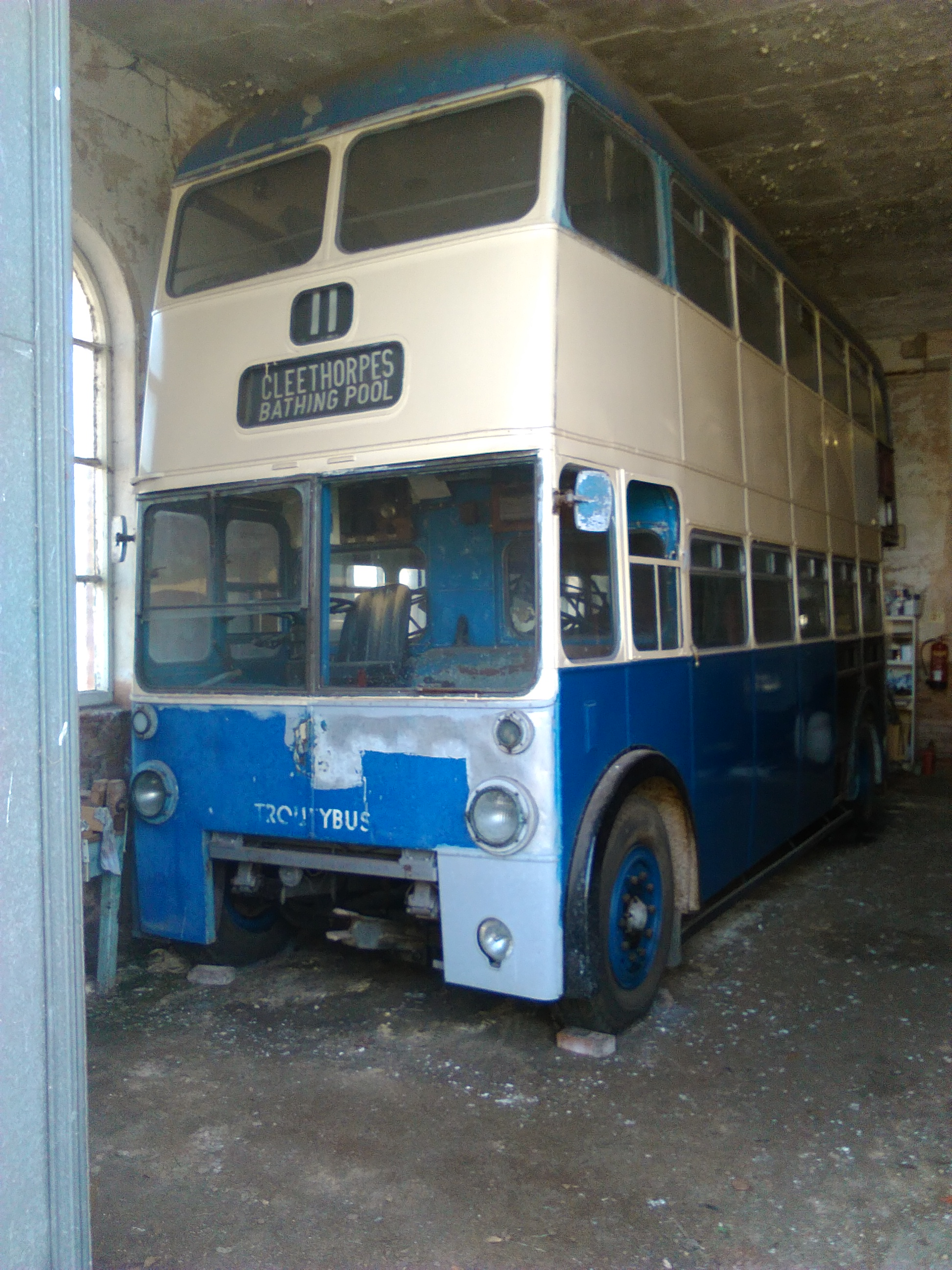
Grimsby-Cleethorpes No.159 undergoing restoration at Westgate Chapel, Belton in 2019

For the opening of the system, Grimsby bought five single-deck vehicles from Richard Garrett & Sons of Leiston, Suffolk in 1926, and supplemented them with two more the following year. When the opening of the Grimsby and Cleethorpes joint service was imminent, they bought ten rather larger vehicles from Associated Equipment Company (AEC). These had three axles and double deck bodywork, with seating for 58 passengers. During the Second World War, they obtained three Karrier vehicles, fitted with wartime utility bodywork, which had bodywork by Park Royal Vehicles of West London, the only ones not to have bodywork by Charles H Roe of Leeds. The final batch were six more Karriers, obtained in 1946–47.

The Cleethorpes vehicles are also mentioned here, because they only ever worked the joint service into Grimsby, and many of them passed to Grimsby-Cleethorpes Transport when that was created in 1957. Their first ten vehicles were two-axle AECs, obtained in 1937, and supplemented by three more in 1938. However, being a seaside town, traffic levels were reduced during the Second World War, and they sold Nos.59 and 60–62 to Nottingham in 1940, as they were experiencing increased traffic levels, but were unable to purchase new vehicles as most manufacturers were engaged in war work. Post-war, they obtained four vehicles from British United Traction (BUT) in 1950, and two from Crossley Motors in 1951.

When the Joint Transport Committee was created, they inherited all of the Karriers and four of the AECs from Grimsby. Cleethorpes vehicles that became part of the joint undertaking had 100 added to their fleet numbers. Three AECs were transferred, as were the four BUTs and two Crossleys. After closure, Karriers 19 to 22 and 24 were sold to Bradford, but never worked in public service, while BUTs 159–162 and Crossleys 163–164 were sold to Walsall.

List of Grimsby vehicles
Fleet numbers	Type	In service	Withdrawn	Chassis	Electrical equipment	Bodywork	Notes
1–5	2-axle	1926	1939–45	Garrett S	Bull	Roe B22C	
6–7	2-axle	1927	1945-45	Garrett S	Bull	Roe B22C	
8–12	3-axle	1936	1955–57	AEC 663T	English Electric	Roe H34/24C	
14–18	3-axle	1936	1955–57	AEC 663T	English Electric	Roe H34/24C	
1–3	2-axle	1944	1958	Karrier W	English Electric	Park Royal UH30/26R	
19–24	2-axle	1946–47	1959–60	Karrier W	MetroVick	Roe H31/25R	19–22,24 sold to Bradford

List of Cleethorpes vehicles
Fleet numbers	Type	In service	Withdrawn	Chassis	Electrical equipment	Bodywork	Notes
50–59	2-axle	1937	1954–60	AEC 661T	English Electric	Park Royal H30/26R	59 sold to Nottingham
60–62	2-axle	1938	1954–60	AEC 661T	English Electric	Park Royal H30/26R	sold to Nottingham
59–62	2-axle	1950	1960	BUT 9611T	MetroVick	NCB H28/26R	sold to Walsall
63–64	2-axle	1951	1960	Crossley Empire	MetroVick	Roe H29/25R	sold to Walsall

List of Grimsby-Cleethorpes Transport vehicles
Fleet numbers	Chassis	Withdrawn			
		1957	1958	1959	1960
1–3	Karrier W		1–3		
11,14,16–17	AEC 663T	11,14,16–17			
19–24	Karrier W			20,23	19,21,22,24
154–155,158	AEC 661T	158	154	155	
159–162	BUT 9611T				159–162
163–164	Crossley Empire				163–164

Bus bodywork designations: key
Prefixes

U	Wartime utility bodywork
B	Bus body single deck
C	Coach body single deck
D	Dual purpose single deck
H	Highbridge body, central upper gangway
L	Lowbridge body, offset sunken upper gangway

Numbers

n	Single deck or total seating
x / y	Upper deck followed by lower deck seating

Suffixes

C	Centre entrance
F	Front entrance
R	Rear entrance
D	Dual entrance

=== Preservation ===
Two of the Grimsby-Cleethorpes Transport vehicles have been preserved.

- No.154 was one of the original batch of AECs bought by Cleethorpes. When vehicles were sold to Nottingham in 1940, it was the newer ones that departed, and three of the batch were left in 1957. No.154 only lasted for a year, and was sold to a scrap merchant in 1958, but was rescued in 1968, and moved to The Trolleybus Museum at Sandtoft in 1971. The owner sold it in 1975, and the new owner is restoring it to its pre-1957 Cleethorpes condition.
- No.159 was also an ex-Cleethorpes vehicle, and was one of a batch of four BUTs bought in 1950, which were fitted with bodywork by Northern Coach Builders. All lasted until the system closed, and were then sold for further use in Walsall. Three of them were lengthened and given front entrances, but No.159 remained in its original condition. Ownership passed to the West Midlands Passenger Transport Executive in 1969, and it was sold for preservation in March 1970. It returned to the Walsall system for the last day of operations on 3 October 1970, and moved to Sandtoft later in October. It was sold to a new owner, and is not currently on public display, as it is stored at Westgate in nearby Belton. The owner intends to restore it as No.159 in its Grimsby-Cleethorpes colours.

== See also ==
- History of Grimsby
- Transport in Grimsby
- List of trolleybus systems in the United Kingdom
- Trolleybuses in Cleethorpes
