= Trolleybuses in Cleethorpes =

Discontinued public transport system in Lincolnshire, England

Cleethorpes trolleybus system
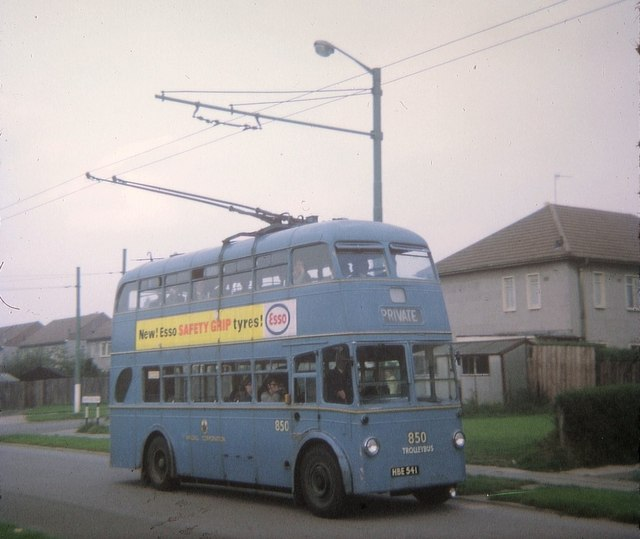
- Former Grimsby/Cleethorpes trolleybus 63 working on the Walsall system as No.850, September 1969

Operation
- Locale: Cleethorpes, Lincolnshire, England
- Open: 18 July 1937
- Close: 4 June 1960
- Status: Closed
- Routes: 1
- Operator: Cleethorpes Corporation Transport

Infrastructure
- Stock: 13 (maximum)

The Cleethorpes trolleybus system once served the holiday resort of Cleethorpes, in Lincolnshire, England. Opened on 18 July 1937, it replaced part of the Great Grimsby Street Tramways, a tramway that had served both Cleethorpes and the neighbouring seaport of Grimsby. It was closed on 4 June 1960.

By the standards of the various now-defunct trolleybus systems in the United Kingdom, the Cleethorpes system was a very small one, with only one route, and a maximum fleet of just 13 trolleybuses. It was operated jointly with the Grimsby trolleybus system.

== History ==
Cleethorpes had been served by a tramway since 1877 when the Great Grimsby Street Tramways, which had been operating in Grimsby since 1881, extended their main line over the boundary and along Grimsby Road to terminate at the junction with Poplar Road. Like so many similar tramways at the time, the horses were replaced by electric tramcars, with the new vehicles taking over from 7 December 1901. The tramway continued in private ownership until in 1922, Grimsby Corporation exercised their rights under the Tramways Act 1870 (33 & 34 Vict. c. 78) to buy the portion of it that was in the borough. Negotiations took nearly three years to complete, but on 6 April 1925 they paid the tramway company £109,848, and took over 70 percent of the system and 13 tramcars, leaving them just the 1.9 miles (3.1 km) in Cleethorpes, some tramcars and the main depot. Grimsby converted the Riby Square to Welholme Road branch to trolleybus operation on 3 October 1926, extending it to Weelsby Road, but the main Grimsby to Cleethorpes route remained a joint operation between Grimsby Corporation and the Tramway company.

In 1928, Cleethorpes obtained the Cleethorpes Urban District Council Act 1928 (18 & 19 Geo. 5. c. lxxvi), giving them powers to operate the tramway within their area, which would give them time to convert it to a trolleybus route should they decide to buy it. No action was taken immediately, but in 1932 the tramway company were looking seriously at the possibility of running trolleybuses in Cleethorpes instead of the trams, and reached an agreement with Grimsby that if they converted their part of the joint route between the towns, Grimsby would reciprocate, allowing a through service to continue to operate. Both sides were ready to proceed by 1935, but the Tramway company agreed to sell the remainder of the tramway to Cleethorpes in 1935, and once negotiations were completed, Cleethorpes paid £50,000 for the tramcars, the power station and the depot, taking over responsibility on 15 July 1936. Cleethorpes became a municipal borough on 23 September 1936, and the transport department became Cleethorpes Corporation Transport.

Grimsby had converted their part of the route by late 1936, and began running trolleybuses to the borough boundary at Park Street on 22 November. For the next eight months, the Grimsby part of the route was served by both trolleybuses and trams running over the same section. Cleethorpes meanwhile were converting their overhead wiring, and extending it for a short distance beyond the Kingsway tram terminus to a new turning circle at Bathing Pool on the seafront. Trolleybuses took over from trams on 18 July 1937, and through running between the two systems began. For the opening of the system, the fledgling Transport Department purchased ten two-axle rear-entrance trolleybuses from Associated Equipment Company (AEC), to be supplemented a year later by three more. They also installed a turning circle at Park Street, enabling them to run short workings within the borough.

Being a seaside town, Cleethorpes saw a reduction in traffic levels during the Second World War, whereas many towns saw increases in traffic, but were unable to purchase additional vehicles as most of the manufacturers were engaged in war work. Cleethorpes therefore sold four of their trolleybuses to Nottingham in 1940, where they continued in service until 1952. Traffic levels improved after hostilities ended, so they bought four trolleybuses from British United Traction in 1950, and two from Crossley Motors in 1951.

=== Amalgamation and demise ===
The idea of amalgamating the transport departments of Grimsby and Cleethorpes had first been mooted in 1938, but did not result in any action being taken. Serious discussions began again in 1953, and after many months of negotiations, an agreement was reached. The Grimsby-Cleethorpes Joint Transport Committee was created, and took over the operation of both trolleybus systems from 1 January 1957. Both corporations also contributed a number of motorbuses to the new undertaking. A new blue and cream livery was applied to the vehicles, replacing the maroon and cream of Grimsby and the blue and grey of Cleethorpes. All remaining vehicles were moved to the Victoria Road depot in Grimsby, enabling the depot on Pelham Road in Cleethorpes to be closed on 2 March 1957. The Cleethorpes vehicles had 100 added to their fleet numbers. The joint venture was short lived, as Sunday services were withdrawn in 1958, and in October 1959 a report was produced suggesting that the system should be closed down completely. Both corporations ratified the decision in November, and the final day of trolleybus operation was 4 June 1960.

All of Cleethorpes' post-war vehicles were sold on to Walsall, where they continued to operate until 1970, when that system closed. Two of the vehicles have been preserved, and are part of the collection at The Trolleybus Museum at Sandtoft, where they are in various stages of restoration.

== Fleet ==
For the opening of the Cleethorpes system, ten trolleybuses were obtained from Associated Equipment Company in 1937. They were fitted with electrical equipment by English Electric and 56-seat bodywork by Park Royal Vehicles of West London. Three more vehicles of the same design were obtained in 1938. When traffic levels dropped during the Second World War, they sold the four newest vehicles, Nos.59 to 62 to Nottingham in 1940. Post-war, the fleet was supplemented by six further vehicles, four from British United Traction, obtained in 1950, and two from Crossley Motors of Manchester, purchased in 1951. These last two were an unusual choice, as all of Crossley's post-war production had been built for Manchester or Ashton-under-Lyne, and were fitted with Crossley's all-metal bodywork, whereas Cleethorpes two chassis received bodywork by Charles H Roe of Leeds. They were the last two chassis supplied by Crossley, as they ran into financial difficulties soon afterwards, and stopped marketing vehicles. They were also the only Crossley trolleybuses ever to work for more than one operator, being owned successively by Cleethorpes Corporation Transport, Grimsby-Cleethorpes Transport, Walsall Corporation Transport and the West Midlands Passenger Transport Executive.

List of Cleethorpes vehicles
Fleet numbers	Type	In service	Withdrawn	Chassis	Electrical equipment	Bodywork	Notes
50–59	2-axle	1937	1954–60	AEC 661T	English Electric	Park Royal H30/26R	59 sold to Nottingham
60–62	2-axle	1938	1954–60	AEC 661T	English Electric	Park Royal H30/26R	sold to Nottingham
59–62	2-axle	1950	1960	BUT 9611T	MetroVick	NCB H28/26R	sold to Walsall
63–64	2-axle	1951	1960	Crossley Empire	MetroVick	Roe H29/25R	sold to Walsall

Bus bodywork designations: key
Prefixes

U	Wartime utility bodywork
B	Bus body single deck
C	Coach body single deck
D	Dual purpose single deck
H	Highbridge body, central upper gangway
L	Lowbridge body, offset sunken upper gangway

Numbers

n	Single deck or total seating
x / y	Upper deck followed by lower deck seating

Suffixes

C	Centre entrance
F	Front entrance
R	Rear entrance
D	Dual entrance

=== Preservation ===
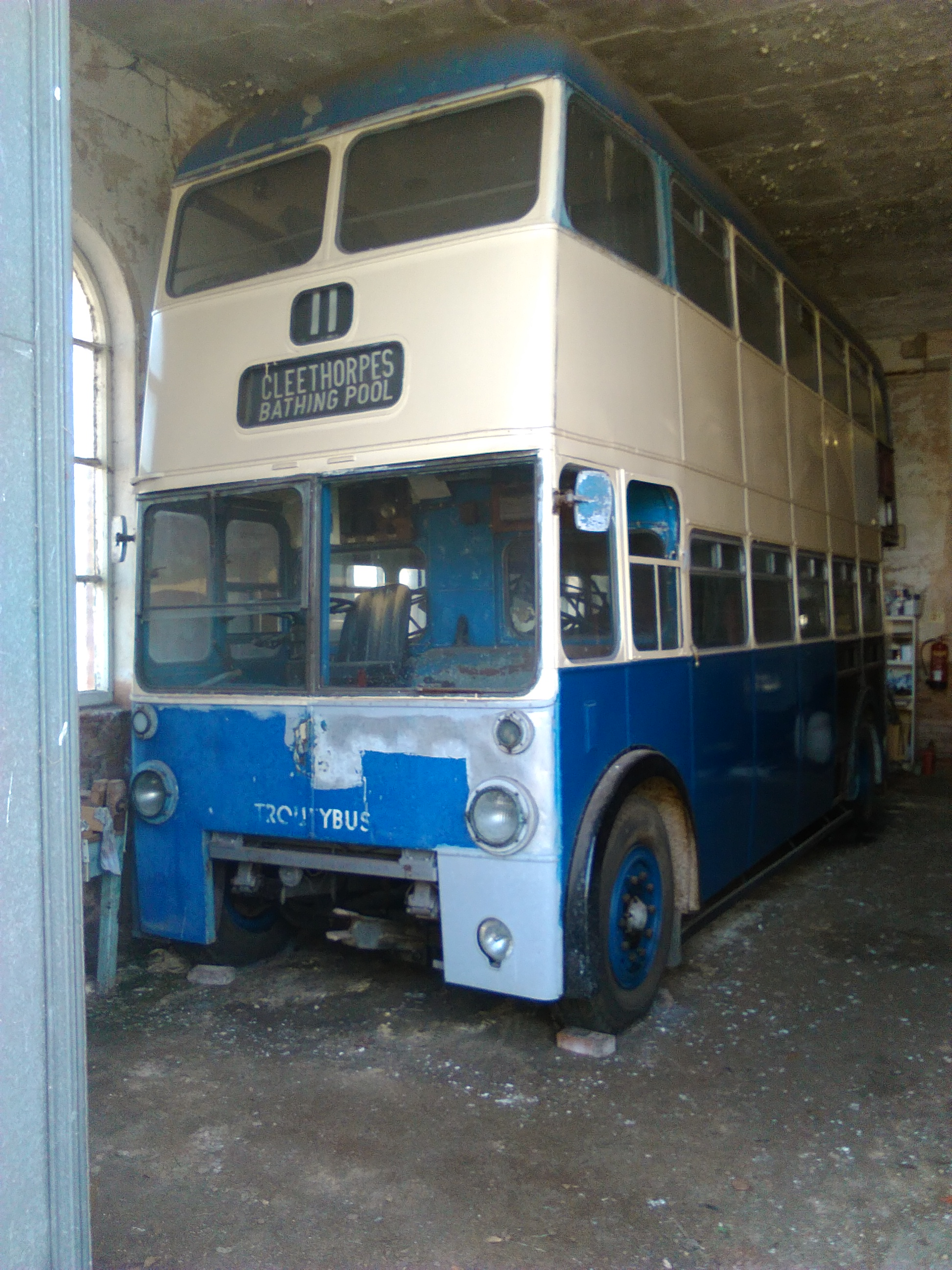
Grimsby-Cleethorpes No.159 undergoing restoration at Westgate Chapel, Belton in 2019

Two of the Grimsby-Cleethorpes Transport vehicles have been preserved.

- No.154 was one of the original batch of AECs bought by Cleethorpes. When vehicles were sold to Nottingham in 1940, it was the newer ones that departed, and although some were withdrawn from 1954 onwards, three of the batch were left in 1957 to become part of Grimsby-Cleethorpes Transport. No.154 only lasted for a year, and was sold to a scrap merchant in 1958, but was rescued in 1968, and moved to The Trolleybus Museum at Sandtoft in 1971. The owner sold it in 1975, and the new owner is restoring it to its pre-1957 Cleethorpes condition.
- No.159 was also an ex-Cleethorpes vehicle, and was one of a batch of four BUTs bought in 1950, which were fitted with bodywork by Northern Coach Builders. All lasted until the system closed, and were then sold for further use in Walsall. Three of them were lengthened and given front entrances, but No.159 remained in its original condition. Ownership passed to the West Midlands Passenger Transport Executive in 1969, and it was sold for preservation in March 1970. It returned to the Walsall system for the last day of operations on 3 October 1970, and was moved to Sandtoft later in October. It was sold to a new owner, and is not currently on public display, as it is stored at Westgate in nearby Belton. The owner intends to restore it as No.159 in its Grimsby-Cleethorpes colours.

== See also ==
- History of Cleethorpes
- Transport in Cleethorpes
- List of trolleybus systems in the United Kingdom
- Trolleybuses in Grimsby
