= Trolleybuses in Walsall =

Walsall trolleybus system
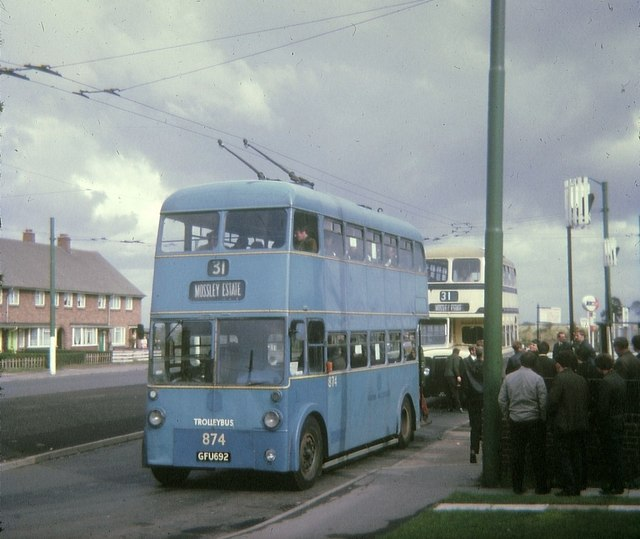
- A Walsall trolleybus at Mossley Estate, October 1970.

Operation
- Locale: Walsall, Staffordshire (now West Midlands), England
- Open: 22 July 1931
- Close: 3 October 1970
- Status: Closed
- Routes: 6
- Operator: Walsall Corporation Transport

Infrastructure
- Stock: 60 (maximum)

The Walsall trolleybus system once served the town of Walsall, then in Staffordshire, but now in West Midlands, England. Opened on 22 July 1931, it gradually replaced the Walsall Corporation Tramways network.

By the standards of the various now defunct trolleybus systems in the United Kingdom, the Walsall system was a medium-sized one, with a total of 6 routes, and a maximum fleet of 60 trolleybuses. It was also one of the last to be closed, on 3 October 1970.

In its final years, the Walsall system had a very diverse fleet of trolleybuses, many of which had been acquired secondhand from already closed trolleybus systems elsewhere in England.

Three of the former Walsall system trolleybuses are now preserved in their pale blue Walsall livery. Two of them are at the Trolleybus Museum at Sandtoft, Lincolnshire, and one is at the Black Country Living Museum in Dudley. One of the vehicles bought from Cleethorpes is also preserved at Sandtoft, where it will revert to its Grimsby-Cleethorpes livery.

== History ==
Walsall Corporation had run an electric tramway system since 1901, when it took over 1.37 miles (2.20 km) of electric tramway which had been constructed within its boundaries by the South Staffordshire Tramways Company. In 1911, when the first two trolleybus systems in Britain were opened, at Leeds and Bradford, they looked at the possibilities of using trolleybuses to feed traffic into the tramway network, and in 1914 obtained the powers necessary to do so, but no routes were constructed. The next significant move was enshrined in the Walsall Corporation Act 1925, which allowed them to run trolleybuses on any of the existing tramway routes, on some other roads within the borough, and to run services outside of their area to Willenhall, Shireoaks and Brownhills. Again, nothing was done immediately, but the tramway to Willenhall met the Wolverhampton tramway at that point until 1926, when Wolverhampton replaced their trams on the route with motorbuses. On 15 May 1927, they replaced the motorbus service with trolleybuses.

Walsall continued to run trams to Willenhall until 1928, when they were withdrawn and a joint motorbus service was introduced between the towns. However, they soon decided to extend the trolleybus wiring from Willenhall into the town centre, and on 22 July 1931 began operating their first trolleybuses, though only as far as Willenhall. To run the service they bought two three-axle double-deck vehicles from Associated Equipment Company (AEC) and two from Guy Motors. Wolverhampton had used single-deck vehicles on the route, because there was a low bridge at Horseley Fields, but this was reconstructed to allow a through service to run from 16 November 1932. Conversion of the tram route to Walsall Wood, to the north east of the town, had been considered in 1927, but because the roads were affected by mining subsidence, the trams were replaced by motorbuses when they ceased in 1928.

That left just the tramway northwards from the town to Bloxwich, which already had trolleybus wiring along half of its length, since the depot for both the trams and trolleybuses was at Birchills. The final trams ran on 30 September 1933, with the trolleybus service starting the following day. A batch of 15 three-axle double-deck vehicles were ordered from Sunbeam Commercial Vehicles for the start of the service, and were supplemented by another six similar vehicles between 1938 and 1940. The possibility of creating a circular route running through Wednesbury and Darlaston was considered, but because it would have involved a number of sharp turns and running along narrow streets, it was deemed to be unsuitable. During the Second World War, traffic levels rose, and to meet the demands, the Corporation managed to obtain 12 utility-bodied Sunbeams between 1943 and 1946. Bournemouth saw reduced traffic levels at this time, and loaned 30 of their vehicles to six other operators, two of which operated in Walsall between 1943 and 1945.

In 1947, the trolley booms on existing vehicles were modified, with the trolley wheels being replaced by carbon-insert trolley heads. Another ten Sunbeams were purchased in 1950, enabling some of the early pre-war vehicles to be withdrawn. The employment of a new general manager, R. Edgley Cox, in 1952 was the start of a new phase for the network, as he had his mind set on upgrading and extending the system. An experimental three-axle Sunbeam S7 was acquired in 1953, with a rear entrance, a central exit, electrically operated doors and a desk at which the conductor sat, collecting the fares as passengers boarded. This was not liked by the crews, and it was later altered, losing its central exit and the conductor's desk. The next batch of new vehicles were 15 Sunbeam F4As obtained in 1954-1955. These were 30 feet (9.1 m) long, and were the first vehicles of this length to be built with only two axles for use in Britain. When the first of these entered service, the legislation had not been changed to allow them to operate, and a special dispensation had to be obtained from the Ministry of Transport. New vehicle purchases came to an end when another seven Sunbeams were obtained in 1956.

In the early 1930s, the country had been hit by depression, resulting in large scale unemployment, which had been relieved by the Government assisting in the construction of new council housing estates. Walsall had benefitted in this way, and had provided new or extended bus services to the estates, but realised that a proper bus station was required. The Blue Coat School had recently constructed a new school building in Springhill Road, leaving their former site on St Paul's Road vacant, and this was chosen as the site for the central Bus Station. It included new offices for the Corporation Transport department, and although it was not officially opened until 23 September 1937, buses had been using it for over two years by that time. However, there was no access for trolleybuses, until in 1950 some housing on lower Stafford Street were demolished, allowing the trolleybuses to run along St Paul's Street, use a turning circle opposite St Paul's Church, and run into one of the bays in the bus station. Walsall was one of a very small number of towns where trolleybuses departed from a bus station.

=== Development ===
Faced with the construction of new housing to the north of the town, and the need to provide a public transport service for the residents, the Walsall Corporation Act 1954 was obtained, to authorise extensions to the system. The first route to be constructed using its powers was from the town centre to Blakenall, to the east of the route to Bloxwich, which opened on 6 June 1955. It replaced a motorbus service, which was overstretched, as in peak periods there were two buses every five minutes, and the larger capacity of the trolleybuses relieved the situation. Another service to the west of the Bloxwich route opened on 12 September 1955, terminating at the Gypsy Lane Estate, which was later known as Beechdale. Less than a month later, the Blakenall route was extended northwards to meet the Bloxwich route on 10 October, creating a circular service. The Bloxwich service was itself extended on 3 June 1957, to service the Mossley Estate, and this was extended again from Abbey Square to the Eagle Hotel on 20 September 1959.

A second circular route was created on 13 November 1961, when the Beechdale route was extended northwards to meet the Mossley Estate line, and the northern extensions were completed on 31 December 1962 when trolleybuses began to serve Lower Farm Estate. The next route to open was a short branch from the Beechdale route to Cavendish Road, which opened on 2 September 1963. It was planned to open this earlier, but the likely line of the new M6 motorway was not finalised in time, and plans to turn it into a circular route returning to the town centre via Bentley and the Wolverhampton Road were cancelled because the route was obstructed by construction of the motorway.

Edgley Cox's next plan was for a new generation of trolleybuses, for which he prepared the drawings. It would be 35 feet (11 m) long, have three doorways, two staircases, and would be a two-axle design. It was designed to carry 100 passengers, and would be suitable for one man operation, with users paying as the entered through the front entrance. It did not however go into production, and instead the Corporation bought a number of second-hand vehicles from systems which were closing down. They came from Pontypridd, Hastings, Grimsby and Cleethorpes, and Ipswich. The M6 motorway was also the cause of the first contraction of the system. Although Wolverhampton had already decided to abandon trolleybuses, an agreement was reached where the joint service between the towns would continue until at least 1967, but the motorway severed the route, and it closed on 31 October 1965.

=== Demise ===
In common with other operators, the corporation was facing rising costs for electricity, and difficulty in obtaining spare parts to maintain the trolleybuses. In 1967, a new one-way system was introduced in the town centre, but the trolleybuses continued to run against the flow of traffic. Optimism was still high within the corporation, and they planned to obtain another act of Parliament in 1969 to allow them to construct five short extensions to the system, mainly links to run between existing routes. There was also hope that a number of Sunbeams could be obtained from the Bournemouth system. To try out new ideas, No.866 was rebuilt with a forward entrance instead of a rear platform, so that one-man operation would be possible.

The plans came to nothing when the Walsall transport system became part of the newly-formed West Midlands Passenger Transport Executive in October 1969. It became the only trolleybus system ever to be run by a passenger transport executive, but the decision was taken to close it down as soon as possible. Parts of the system were closed in February 1970, using motorbuses dating from the early 1950s, which were moved to Walsall from Birmingham. The last day of public operation was 2 October 1970, but a special service ran on the following day between the bus station and Bloxwich. After a formal closing ceremony, Edgley Cox drove the final trolleybus into the depot.

== Fleet ==
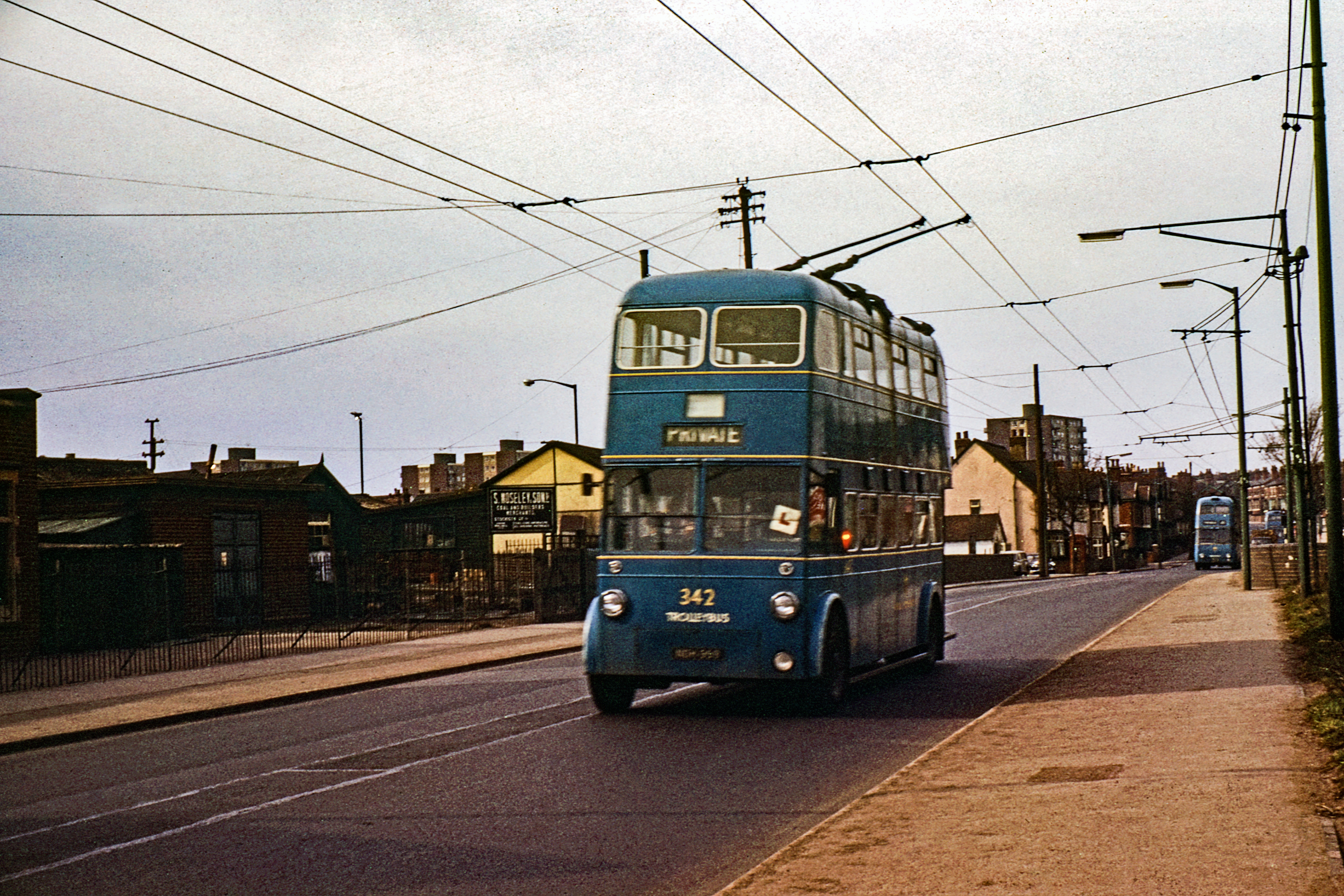
Walsall Corporation Trolleybus No. 342 (Sunbeam F4)

When Walsall started operating trolleybuses in 1931, they bought four vehicles, two from Associated Equipment Company (AEC) with English Electric electrical equipment and bodywork, and two from Guy Motors, with Ress-Stevens equipment and bodywork by Brush Traction. For the opening of the route to Bloxwich, they standardised on vehicles from Sunbeam Commercial Vehicles with electrical equipment from British Thomson-Houston, but the 15 vehicles had bodywork by three different manufacturers. Many of these early vehicles had artificial radiators at the front, making them look a little like motorbuses, but subsequent vehicles had a flat front. Further batches of Sunbeams were acquired in 1938 and 1940, with bodywork by a fourth manufacturer, Park Royal Vehicles of west London, although they seemed to have standardised on British Thomson-Houston electrical equipment by this time, and all of the early vehicles had three axles.

During the Second World War, options for buying more vehicles were severely limited, as most manufacturers were engaged in war work, and there was only one model available. This was the Karrier or Sunbeam W4, all of which were built at Wolverhampton in the Sunbeam factory. The model included the best features of the Karrier E4 and the Sunbeam MF2 two-axle designs, and was badged with a Sunbeam logo if the order was placed through Sunbeam's Wolverhampton office, and a Karrier logo if it was placed through Karrier's Luton office. All came with simple utility bodywork, but again, an eclectic mix of bodywork builders were used, with five batches of vehicles having bodywork from three manufacturers.

When replacement of the pre-war vehicles became necessary, Walsall stayed with their local manufacturer, buying a batch of ten Sunbeam F4 models in 1950-51, Nos.334 to 343, but the arrival of Edgley Cox as general manager in 1952 signalled the start of a period of innovation. The next vehicle ordered, initially No.850 but renumbered as No.350 in 1961, was a three-axle Sunbeam S7, designed to test the concept of pay-as-you-enter. The entrance was at the rear, where there was a desk for the conductor who collected the fares as passengers boarded. There was also a central exit, with a straight staircase opposite it, but the design was not well-received, resulting in the vehicle being rebuilt with just a rear entrance, after which it was renumbered. Innovation continued when a batch of 15 Sunbeam F4A models were obtained in 1954 and 1955. These were of a special lightweight construction, and had 70 seats for passengers. They were 30 feet (9.1 m) long with only two axles, and were built in advance of legislation allowing this length of two-axle vehicle, resulting in No.851 requiring a special dispensation from the Ministry of Transport when it entered service, until the legislation could be amended. One of this batch, No.866, was rebuilt with a forward entrance, in anticipation of the introduction of one-man operation.

Cox's next design for a 100-seat two-axle vehicle which was 35 feet (11 m) long reached the drawing board, but no vehicles were actually built. Instead, second-hand vehicles were acquired from other systems which were contracting or closing. Two came from Pontypridd, eight from Hastings, six from Cleethorpes, and eight from Ipswich. Most of these vehicles entered service as they were bought, but three of the Cleethorpes vehicles originally built by British United Traction in 1950 were rebuilt, with longer bodies and higher seating capacity before being put to use. All had been built with H28/26R rear-entrance bodywork, but they were redesigned with front entrances, Nos.60 and 61 having seating for 69, and No.62 having seating for 67.

In 1965, one of the ten Sunbeam F4 models acquired in 1951, No.342, was rebuilt. The chassis was extended using parts from a motorbus, and the bodywork was adapted accordingly. The extra length meant that the seating capacity could be increased from 56 to 65, although this was the only vehicle in the batch which was altered in this way. The Sunbeam F4A models were ordered in two batches, 15 in the first and a subsequent batch of seven vehicles. Most entered service between November 1954 and June 1955, but delivery of the final new vehicle that the Corporation bought was delayed, as No.872 was exhibited at the 1956 Commercial Motor Show, and did not arrive until 14 October 1956. The batch were fitted with automatic acceleration equipment, while the bodywork was designed to give a streamlined appearance, with the weight and cost reduced as much as possible. No.872 was decorated for the closure of the system, and became Walsall's official last trolleybus.

List of vehicles
Fleet numbers	Type	In service	Withdrawn	Chassis	Electrical equipment	Bodywork	Notes
151-152	3-axle	1931	1946	AEC 663T	English Electric	English Electric H33/27R	
153-154	3-axle	1931	1945	Guy BTX	Rees-Stevens	Brush H32/28R	
155-159	3-axle	1933	1951	Sunbeam MS2	BTH	Beadle H22/28R	
160-164	3-axle	1933	1951	Sunbeam MS2	BTH	Short H32/28R	
165-169	3-axle	1933	1955-56	Sunbeam MS2	BTH	Weymann H32/28R	
187-188	3-axle	1938	1956	Sunbeam MS2	BTH	Park Royal H32/28R	
216-219	3-axle	1940	1956	Sunbeam MS2	BTH	Park Royal H32/28R	
225-226	2-axle	1943	1959-61	Sunbeam W	BTH	Park Royal UH30/26R	
228-230	2-axle	1945	1959	Sunbeam W	BTH	Brush UH30/26R	
231-232	2-axle	1945	1965	Sunbeam W	BTH	Park Royal UH30/26R	
233	2-axle	1945	1965	Sunbeam W	BTH	Brush UH30/26R	
234-237	2-axle	1946	1965	Sunbeam W	BTH	Roe UH30/26R	
334-343	2-axle	1950-51	1964-70	Sunbeam F4	BTH	Brush H30/26R	
850	3-axle	1953	1967	Sunbeam S7	BTH	Willowbrook H38/24D	rebuilt H37/27R
851-872	2-axle	1954-56	1970	Sunbeam F4A	BTH	Willowbrook H36/34R	
301-302	2-axle	1956	1962-63	Karrier W	BTH	Roe UH30/26R	ex Pontypridd
303-310	2-axle	1959	1970	Sunbeam W	BTH	Weymann H30/26R	ex Hastings
850, 873	2-axle	1961	1967-70	Crossley TDD42/3	MetroVick	Roe H29/25R	ex Cleethorpes
874	2-axle	1962	1970	BUT 9611T	MetroVick	NCB H26/26R	ex Cleethorpes
875-876	2-axle	1962-63	1970	BUT 9611T	MetroVick	NCB H39/30F	ex Cleethorpes
877	2-axle	1962	1970	BUT 9611T	MetroVick	NCB H37/30F	ex Cleethorpes
344-7, 351-4	2-axle	1962	1966-70	Sunbeam F4	MetroVick	Park Royal H30/26R	ex Ipswich

Bus bodywork designations: key
Prefixes

U	Wartime utility bodywork
B	Bus body single deck
C	Coach body single deck
D	Dual purpose single deck
H	Highbridge body, central upper gangway
L	Lowbridge body, offset sunken upper gangway

Numbers

n	Single deck or total seating
x / y	Upper deck followed by lower deck seating

Suffixes

C	Centre entrance
F	Front entrance
R	Rear entrance
D	Dual entrance

=== Preservation ===
In 2019 there were four former Walsall trolleybuses which had been preserved.

- No.342 is kept at The Trolleybus Museum at Sandtoft. It was one of the batch of Sunbeam F4s bought in 1951, and was extended in 1965. It ran until the last day of operation, and was then acquired by the Reading Trolleybus Society, who moved it to Sandtoft. In the early days of the museum it was regularly used to provide rides on open days, but by 2006 it was in need of mechanical work and some repairs to its bodywork. In 2006 it was moved away from the museum to some undercover storage until funds could be raised to carry out the repairs.
- No.872 was the Sunbeam F4A that was exhibited at the Commercial Motor Show in 1956, and became the last trolleybus to operate on the Walsall system. It was bought for preservation, together with Nos.862 and 864 from the same batch, and operated at Sandtoft for a number of years, until mechanical problems meant that it could no longer be used. In 1993 it was moved to the Aston Manor Road Transport Museum in Birmingham, where it was put on static display. While there, restoration work on the interior was carried out, and it returned to Sandtoft on 22 May 2011. After the British Trolleybus Society 50th anniversary celebrations, it was taken to Swindon for a full mechanical overhaul in December 2011, and returned to Sandtoft in August 2013. Its return to service was delayed by brake problems, but it has been used regularly since late 2014.
- No.862 was moved to the Black Country Living Museum and is used to give public rides. The museum have a second trolleybus that carries the Walsall livery, but was actually No.735 from the Bradford system.
- No.874 was one of a batch of four BUT vehicles bought from the Grimsby-Cleethorpes system in 1960 when that closed. They were renumbered, becoming 874 to 877 in the Walsall fleet, and three of them were extended and fitted with front entrances, while No.874 remained its original length and retained its rear entrance. After takeover by the WMPTE, it was sold for preservation in March 1970, but returned for the final day of operation. It moved to Sandtoft later in OCtober 1970, and was subsequently sold to a new owner. It is not normally on public view, as it is being restored at Westgate Chapel in nearby Belton, where it is being returned to its Grimsby-Cleethorpes livery.
- No.864 was stored at Sandtoft for many years, but gradually became derelict, and was scrapped in 2016.

== See also ==
- History of Walsall
- Transport in Walsall
- List of trolleybus systems in the United Kingdom
