= AEC 662T =

British two-axle single deck trolleybus chassis

Overview
- Manufacturer: AEC
- Production: 1931 - 1935

Body and chassis
- Doors: 1
- Related: AEC 661T

The AEC 662T was a two-axle single deck trolleybus chassis manufactured by AEC between 1931 and 1935. A single deck version of the AEC 661T, it was based on the ‘Regal’ motorbus. 21 were built for English operators in Darlington (11) and Nottinghamshire and Derbyshire (10), but most were intended for export.
