= List of trolleybus systems in the United Kingdom =

This is a list of trolleybus systems in the United Kingdom by Home Nation and by regions of England. It includes:

- Past trolleybus systems in the UK.
- Museums in the UK capable of running trolleybuses (i.e. possessing overhead wires and trolleybuses in working order).

There are currently no operational trolleybus systems in the UK.

In the United Kingdom the first trolleybus systems were inaugurated on 20 June 1911 in Bradford and Leeds, although public service in Bradford did not commence until 24 June. Coincidentally, the UK's last trolleybus service also operated in Bradford, on 26 March 1972.

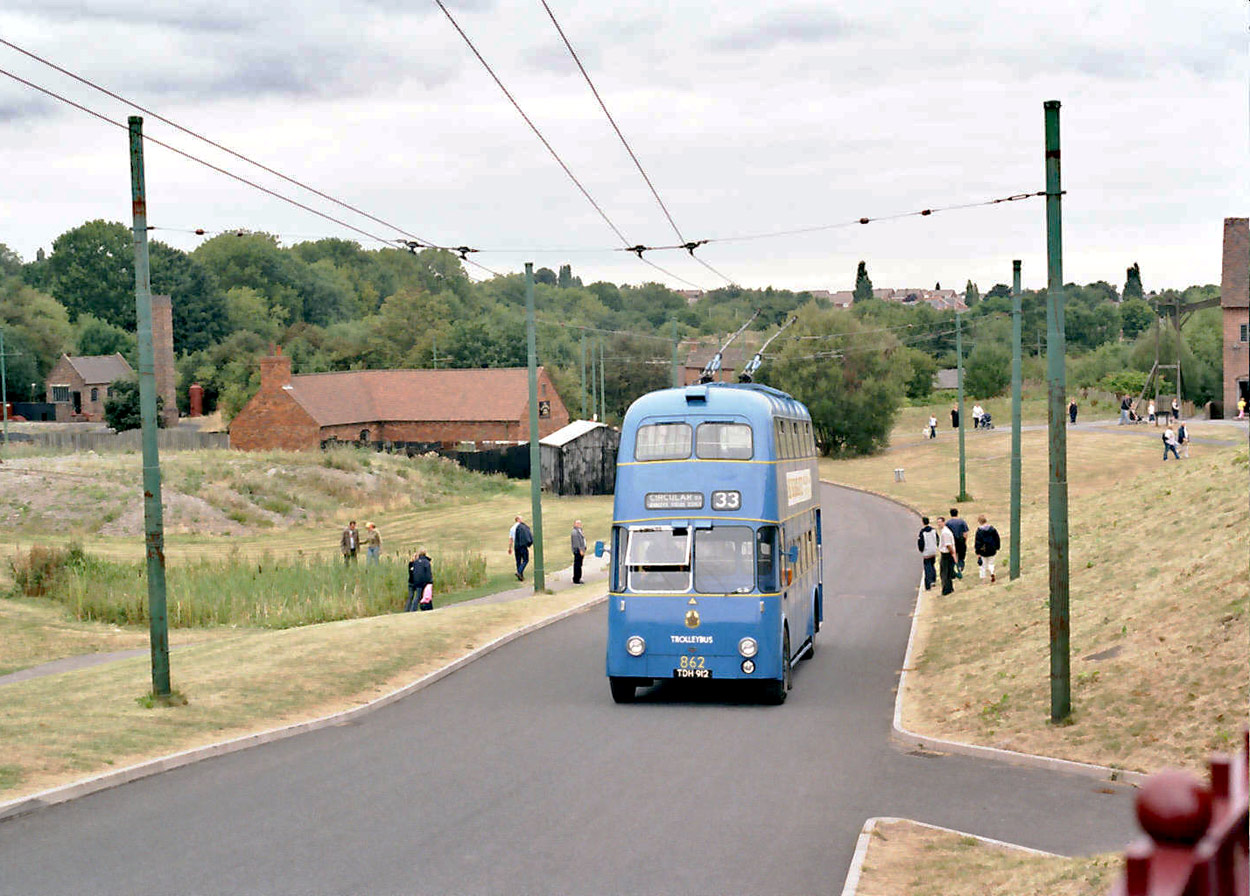
A Walsall trolleybus at the Black Country Living Museum

== England (by region) ==
=== East Midlands ===
Name of system	Location	Date (from)	Date (to)	Notes
	Chesterfield	23 May 1927	24 March 1938	See also Trolleybuses in Chesterfield.
	Derby	9 January 1932	9 September 1967	See also Trolleybuses in Derby.
	Nottingham	10 April 1927	30 June 1966	See also Trolleybuses in Nottingham.
Notts & Derby Traction Company	Nottingham	7 January 1932	25 April 1953	See also Trolleybuses in Nottinghamshire and Derbyshire.

=== East of England ===
Name of system	Location	Date (from)	Date (to)	Notes
	Ipswich	2 September 1923	23 August 1963	See also Trolleybuses in Ipswich.
	Southend-on-Sea	16 October 1925	28 October 1954	See also Trolleybuses in Southend-on-Sea.

=== Greater London ===
Name of system	Location	Date (from)	Date (to)	Notes
	London	1912	-	Demonstration
	London	16 May 1931	8 May 1962	See also Trolleybuses in London.

=== North East England ===
Name of system	Location	Date (from)	Date (to)	Notes
	Darlington	17 January 1926	31 July 1957	See also Trolleybuses in Darlington.
	Hartlepool	28 February 1924	2 April 1953	See also Trolleybuses in Hartlepool.
Tees-side Railless Traction Board	Middlesbrough	8 November 1919	4 April 1971	See also Trolleybuses in Teesside.
	Newcastle upon Tyne	1 October 1935	1 October 1966	See also Trolleybuses in Newcastle upon Tyne.
	South Shields	12 October 1936	29 April 1964	See also Trolleybuses in South Shields.

=== North West England ===
Name of system	Location	Date (from)	Date (to)	Notes
South Lancashire Transport Company	Atherton	3 August 1930	31 August 1958	See also Trolleybuses in South Lancashire.
	St Helens	11 July 1927	1 July 1958	See also Trolleybuses in St Helens.
	Blackpool	1983		Demonstration.
Manchester Corporation Transport	Manchester	1 March 1938	30 December 1966	See also Trolleybuses in Manchester.
	Ashton-under-Lyne	26 August 1925	30 December 1966	See also Trolleybuses in Ashton-under-Lyne.
	Oldham	26 August 1925	5 September 1926	
	Ramsbottom	14 August 1913	31 March 1931	System closed officially in 1928. Occasional operation thereafter to 31 March 1931. See also Trolleybuses in Ramsbottom.
	Stockport	10 March 1913	11 September 1920	See also Trolleybuses in Stockport.
	Wigan	7 May 1925	30 September 1931	See also Trolleybuses in Wigan.

=== South East England ===
Name of system	Location	Date (from)	Date (to)	Notes
Brighton Corporation Transport (BCT)	Brighton	23 December 1913 1 May 1939	16 September 1914 30 June 1961	See also Trolleybuses in Brighton.
Brighton, Hove & District Omnibus Company (BHC)	Brighton	3 March 1946	24 March 1959	All Brighton trolleybuses were lettered "Brighton, Hove & District Transport". See also Trolleybuses in Brighton.
Hastings Tramways Co.	Hastings	1 April 1928	31 May 1959	A wholly owned subsidiary of Maidstone & District Motor Services from 1935. See also Trolleybuses in Hastings.
Maidstone Corporation Transport	Maidstone	1 May 1928	15 April 1967	See also Trolleybuses in Maidstone.
Portsmouth Corporation Transport	Portsmouth	4 August 1934	27 July 1963	See also Trolleybuses in Portsmouth.
Reading Corporation Tramways	Reading	18 July 1936	3 November 1968	See also Trolleybuses in Reading.

=== South West England ===
Name of system	Location	Date (from)	Date (to)	Notes
Bournemouth Corporation Transport (BCT)	Bournemouth & Christchurch	13 May 1933	20 April 1969	See also Trolleybuses in Bournemouth.

=== West Midlands ===
Name of system	Location	Date (from)	Date (to)	Notes
	Birmingham	27 November 1922	30 June 1951	See also Trolleybuses in Birmingham.
	Wolverhampton	29 October 1923	5 March 1967	See also Trolleybuses in Wolverhampton.
	Walsall	22 July 1931	3 October 1970	See also Trolleybuses in Walsall.

=== Yorkshire and the Humber ===
Name of system	Location	Date (from)	Date (to)	Notes
	Bradford	20 June 1911	26 March 1972	The last trolleybus system (apart from museum lines) in the UK. See also Trolleybuses in Bradford.
	Doncaster	22 August 1928	14 December 1963	See also Trolleybuses in Doncaster.
	Doncaster	1985	1986	Demonstration
	Grimsby	3 October 1926	4 June 1960	See also Trolleybuses in Grimsby.
	Cleethorpes	18 July 1937	4 June 1960	See also Trolleybuses in Cleethorpes.
	Halifax	20 July 1921	24 October 1926	See also Trolleybuses in Halifax.
Huddersfield Corporation Transport Trolleybuses	Huddersfield	4 December 1933	13 July 1968	See also Trolleybuses in Huddersfield.
	Keighley	3 May 1913	31 August 1932	See also Trolleybuses in Keighley.
	Kingston upon Hull	23 July 1937	31 October 1964	See also Trolleybuses in Kingston upon Hull.
	Leeds	20 June 1911	26 July 1928	See also Trolleybuses in Leeds.
	Rotherham	3 October 1912	2 October 1965	See also Trolleybuses in Rotherham.
Mexborough and Swinton Traction Company	Mexborough	31 August 1915	26 March 1961	
York Corporation Tramways	York	22 December 1920	5 January 1935	

== Scotland ==
Name of System	Location	Date (From)	Date (To)	Notes
	Dundee	5 September 1912	13 May 1914	First UK system to close. See also Trolleybuses in Dundee
Glasgow Corporation Transport	Glasgow	3 April 1949	27 May 1967	See also Trolleybuses in Glasgow.

== Wales ==
Name of System	Location	Date (From)	Date (To)	Notes
	Aberdare	14 January 1914	1 July 1925	See also Trolleybuses in Aberdare.
	Cardiff	1 March 1942	11 January 1970	See also Trolleybuses in Cardiff.
	Llanelli	26 December 1932	8 November 1952	See also Trolleybuses in Llanelli.
	Pontypridd	18 September 1930	31 January 1957	See also Trolleybuses in Pontypridd.
	Rhondda	22 December 1914	1 March 1915	See also Trolleybuses in Rhondda.

== Northern Ireland ==
Name of System	Location	Date (From)	Date (To)	Notes
	Belfast	28 March 1938	12 May 1968	See also Trolleybuses in Belfast.

== Museums with working trolleybuses ==
- Black Country Living Museum
- East Anglia Transport Museum
- The Trolleybus Museum at Sandtoft
- Beamish Museum

== See also ==
- List of trolleybus systems, for all other countries
- List of town tramway systems in the United Kingdom
- List of light-rail transit systems
- List of rapid transit systems
- Trolleybus usage by country
