= Trolleybuses in Ipswich =

Trolleybus system in Ipswich, England

Ipswich trolleybus system
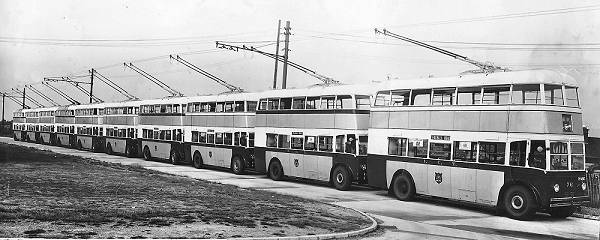
- A delivery photo of 10 Ipswich trolleybuses, 1937.

Operation
- Locale: Ipswich, Suffolk, England
- Open: 2 September 1923
- Close: 23 August 1963
- Status: Closed
- Routes: 14
- Operator: Ipswich Corporation Transport

Infrastructure
- Stock: 85 (maximum)

Statistics
- Route length: 25 mi (40 km)

The Ipswich trolleybus system once served Ipswich, the county town of Suffolk, England. Opened on 2 September 1923, it gradually replaced the Ipswich tramway network.

By the standards of the various now-defunct trolleybus systems in the United Kingdom, the Ipswich system was a medium-sized one, with a total of 14 routes, and a maximum fleet of 85 trolleybuses.

The system was closed on 23 August 1963. In 1962, eight of its newest trolleybuses were sold to Walsall for further service; most of these survived until 1970.

Seven of the former Ipswich system trolleybuses are now preserved. Six are owned by the Ipswich Transport Museum, which is housed in the old Priory Heath trolleybus depot in Cobham Road. The seventh is located at the Long Shop Museum in Leiston, site of the former Garrett Engineering Works.

The Ipswich system remains unique in having a 100%-trolleybus fleet following tram abandonment as well as the unusual combination of green paint and unpainted aluminium side panelling.

== History ==
Ipswich Corporation had been running a 3 ft 6 in (1,067 mm)-gauge electric tramway system since 1900, when an act of Parliament enabled them to take over and extend an existing horse tramway. However, there was some concern about the state of the roads and tram tracks in the town centre by the summer of 1922. Rather than replace the tram tracks, the corporation decided to experiment with trolleybuses, and hired three Railless single deck vehicles to allow this to happen. The route between Ipswich railway station and Cornhill was chosen for the trials, as it was relatively short at 0.75 miles (1.21 km) and the overhead wiring had been altered by May 1923. Railless was a joint venture between Charles H Roe and Short Brothers of Rochester and Bedford, and around this time Charles Roe was experiencing financial difficulties, resulting in Short Brothers buying out Roe's share of the business and restructuring the company. Delivery of the new vehicles was consequently delayed, but trials finally began on 2 September 1923. The vehicles had solid tyres, an entrance at the front to allow for one-man operation, and an open smoking compartment at the rear. As the corporation were pleased with the results of the trials, in 1924 they bought the three vehicles they had hired, and ordered another experimental vehicle from local company Ransomes, Sims & Jefferies.

Next, the corporation decided to run trolleybuses on the route southwards from the town centre to Bourne Bridge. They still considered themselves to be in an experimental phase, and purchased three more vehicles, one each from Richard Garrett & Sons of Leiston, Suffolk, Ransomes of Ipswich, and Tilling-Stevens of Maidstone, Kent. Once reliability had been assessed, 15 vehicles were ordered from Ransomes and another 15 from Garretts. Operation on the Bourne Bridge route began on 17 July 1925, and the corporation laid plans to replace all of the trams with trolleybuses, resulting in the last tram operating on 26 July 1926. The Ipswich Corporation Act 1925 (15 & 16 Geo. 5. c. ciii) was obtained, and routes opened in quick succession. Trolleybuses ran along four new routes in 1926, one more in 1927, and in 1928 the first of several loops were introduced. As the service expanded more vehicles were bought, with six from Ransomes in 1928/29, three more Ransomes in 1930, and a lone Garrett in 1931. All were single deck vehicles, with an entrance at the front to allow for one-man operation, but this was not particularly successful, and all services were worked by a two-man crew from 1932. Subsequently, the corporation switched to double deck designs, buying 4 in 1933, ten in 1934, and eight in 1935, all from Ransomes.

Expansion of the system continued, with eight more routes opening between 1931 and 1940. The main depot was at Constantine Road, from where wires ran northwards to Barrack Corner and southwards to Princes Street, near the station, but there were no public services along these two stretches. In 1937 a new depot, complete with workshops, was completed at Priory Heath, near the eastern edge of the system. Ransomes produced a leaflet in 1939 stating that all of the trolleybuses operating in Ipswich had been made by them, but this was untrue, as ten of the original Garretts were still in operation, as well as 61 vehicles from Ransomes. They supplied one more vehicle in 1940, the last one they sold to a British system, although they continued to make trolleybuses for overseas operators. During the Second World War, four Karrier vehicles with utility bodywork were delivered in 1944, and another twelve in 1945. Some of the Garretts were not withdrawn until after they had arrived, and so Ransomes claims were never true. The network was extended for the final time in 1947, when overhead wiring was erected to Sidegate Lane in April and from Priory Heath to the Airport in August.

The network was quite comprehensive, and enabled a number of circular routes to be operated. In particular, the '0' service ran from the town centre to Broke Hall, continued around the eastern and north-eastern edge of the town to Colchester Road, also the terminus for an unnumbered service, from where it returned to the town centre. Twenty-four new trolleybuses were purchased from Karrier and Sunbeam between 1948 and 1950, and some of the single deck vehicles from the 1920s were still operating on the Adair Road route, where a low bridge prevented double deck vehicles from replacing them. A number of extensions to the system, to serve areas where new housing was being built, or to form links between existing routes, were proposed and authorised by Acts of Parliament obtained in 1946 and 1948, but in 1948 electricity generation was nationalised, and two departments which had worked together for 48 years were split apart. This caused the corporation to consider the long-term future of the trolleybus network, and in 1950 they purchased their first motor buses. Three years later, the first trolleybus service was withdrawn, when the elderly vehicles on the Adair Street route were scrapped and replaced by the new form of transport.

Thus began the gradual replacement of the trolleybuses, but the dates of final operation on many routes are uncertain, as in some cases they were withdrawn and then reinstated for a while, or motor bus services were supplemented by trolleybuses during peak periods, but by 29 April 1962, when operation on the Rushmere Heath and Norwich Road routes ceased, just four routes remained. These succumbed to the motor bus on 23 August 1963, when the final journey carried a large notice stating "This is DEFINITELY the last trolleybus." However, eight of the final batch of Sunbeam F4 vehicles saw further service in the Midlands, when they were sold on for use on the Walsall system.

=== Fleet ===
For the opening of the Ipswich system, the corporation hired three single deck vehicles from Railless, for what they saw as an experimental phase. When they then applied to Parliament for legal powers to convert the whole of the tramway system to trolleybus operation, it prompted two local companies into action. Ransomes, Sims & Jefferies of Ipswich had been agricultural engineers since the late 18th century, but had built battery-electric commercial road vehicles during the First World War. Ransomes looked at the Railless design and simplified it, to produce an "improved electric trolleybus". The chassis was straight and mounted high enough to clear the axles. A single 35 hp (26 kW) motor drove the rear axle through a worm drive. They made the motor and tramway-type hand controller themselves, and also built the 30-seat front entrance bodywork. After testing, this vehicle became the fourth vehicle in Ipswich's fleet.

Richard Garrett & Sons of Leiston were also sure they could convince Ipswich to buy locally, and produced a similar vehicle with a high straight chassis. Garretts were also known as agricultural engineers, but were part of a group of companies that included Bull Motors, who supplied the electric motors for all Garrett trolleybuses. Again the rear axle was powered by a worm and wheel arrangement. The experimental vehicle was fitted with a 50 hp (37 kW) motor, with a controller made by Garretts and operated by a foot pedal. Charles H. Roe of Leeds built the 32-seat centre entrance bodywork, and while it was in the north, the vehicle was tested on the Leeds, Keighley and Bradford systems. It arrived at Ipswich on 16 July 1925, and testing lasted until March 1926. Tilling-Stevens were from further afield, and had produced petrol-electric motorbuses for some years, but were relatively new to the trolleybus market. They supplied a model TS6 for evaluation by Ipswich, where it carried the fleet number 5.

Ransomes built a second prototype, the type C, after they had evaluated the first one. This had a lower floor, so that there were only two steps for passengers to negotiate, rather than three, and the floor height of 2 feet 2 inches (0.66 m) was achieved by placing the 40 hp (30 kW) motor over the front axle. The controller became pedal-operated, leaving the driver's hands free to steer the vehicle, sound the horn, and apply the hand brake. This was loaned to Ipswich in December 1925 and carried the fleet number 6, but the loan was only for five months, and it was subsequently sold to Poznan in Poland, after it had been fitted with pneumatic tyres and the entrance had been moved to the other side. Garrett's prototype seems to have also been on loan, since it did not receive a fleet number. Garrett built a second prototype, again with a lower floor, and although it never ran on the Ipswich system, it proved the concept, resulting in the production batch of 15 vehicles for Ipswich having lower floors. In a surprisingly modern twist, the front axle was set back, so that the entrance could be placed in front of the wheel to facilitate one-man operation.

Ipswich then stuck with Ransomes for their fleet until the Second World War, apart from one more Garrett which arrived in 1931. Garretts decided to stop producing trolleybuses in 1930, but they had a continental demonstrator. This was converted to right hand drive and bought by Ipswich on 24 November 31, after which the company went into receivership. The final vehicle supplied by Ransomes was also a demonstrator, which had been built in 1939 for a tour of South Africa, but the onset of the Second World War meant that the tour did not go ahead. Ipswich bought it in 1940, and it was the last trolleybus that Ransomes supplied to the British market.

During the latter part of the war, vehicles were purchased from Karrier and Sunbeam, but they were essentially the same. The Karrier model W was built at the Wolverhampton factory of Sunbeam, and badged with a Sunbeam logo if the order was placed through Sunbeam's Wolverhampton office, or a Karrier logo if it was placed through Karrier's Luton office. Karrier stopped producing their trolleybuses in 1946, when the Rootes group sold the manufacturing rights to Brockhouse, but retained the Karrier marque for use on lorries for local authorities.

List of vehicles
Fleet numbers	Type	In service	Withdrawn	Chassis	Electrical equipment	Bodywork
1-3	2-axle	1923	1933-35	Railless	English Electric	Short B30F
4	2-axle	1924	1933-35	Ransomes	Ransomes/English Electric	RS&J B30F
5	2-axle	1925	1933-35	Tilling-Stevens		Ransomes B30F
6	2-axle	1925	1926	Ransomes	Ransomes/English Electric	Ransomes B31D
21-35	2-axle	1926	1937-51	Garrett O	Bull/Garrett	Garrett B31D
6-20	2-axle	1926	1937-54	Ransomes	Ransomes/English Electric	Ransomes B31D
36-44	2-axle	1928-30	1937-54	Ransomes	Ransomes/English Electric	Ransomes B31D
45	2-axle	1931	1937-54	Garrett O	Bull/Garrett	Garrett B31C
46-67	2-axle	1933-36	1945-58	Ransomes	Ransomes/English Electric	Ransomes H24/24R
68-85	2-axle	1937-40	1945-58	Ransomes	Ransomes/English Electric	Massey H24/24R
86	2-axle	1937-40	1960-61	Ransomes	Ransomes/English Electric	Massey H24/24R
87-90	2-axle	1944	1960-61	Karrier W	Metrovick	Weymann UH30/26R
91-102	2-axle	1945	1960-61	Karrier W	Metrovick	Park Royal UH30/26R
103-108	2-axle	1948-49	1961-63	Karrier W	Metrovick	Park Royal H30/26R
109-114	2-axle	1948-49	1961-63	Karrier F4	Metrovick	Park Royal H30/26R
115-126	2-axle	1948-49	1961-63	Sunbeam F4	Metrovick	Park Royal H30/26R

Bus bodywork designations: key
Prefixes

U	Wartime utility bodywork
B	Bus body single deck
C	Coach body single deck
D	Dual purpose single deck
H	Highbridge body, central upper gangway
L	Lowbridge body, offset sunken upper gangway

Numbers

n	Single deck or total seating
x / y	Upper deck followed by lower deck seating

Suffixes

C	Centre entrance
F	Front entrance
R	Rear entrance
D	Dual entrance

== Preservation ==
Seven vehicles from the Ipswich fleet have found new life in preservation, and the chassis of an eighth is also preserved.

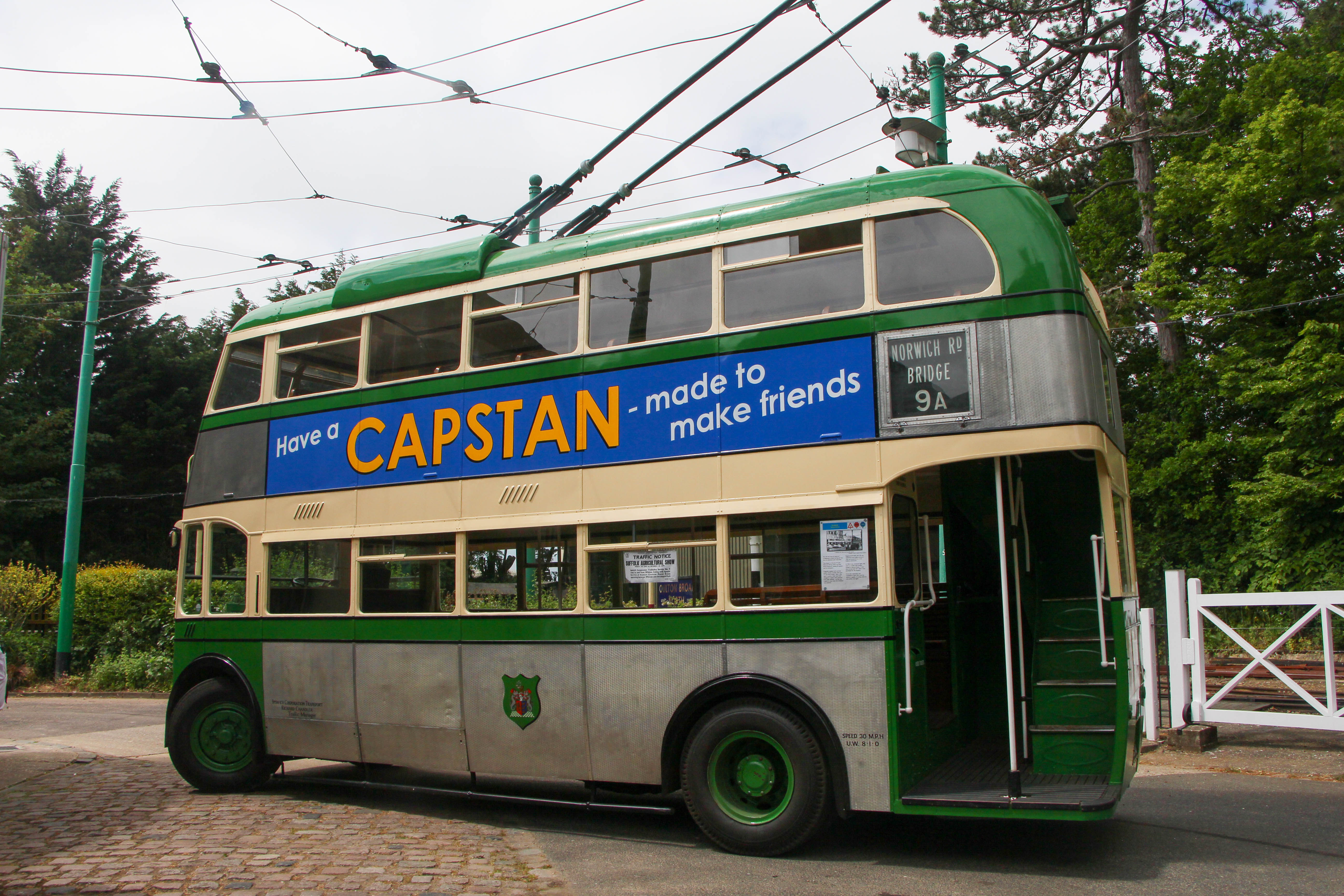
Karrier W 105, now at the East Anglia Transport Museum

- Railless trolleybus No.2, built in 1923 with English Electric equipment and a 30-seat Short single deck body, carried the registration number DX 3988. It was withdrawn in 1934 and moved to Flatford, where it was used as a caravan. The Ipswich Transport Museum obtained it in 1977 and it was cosmetically restored by 1981. Around 2007 it was fitted with an Estler trolleybase, where the two trolleypoles are mounted one above the other on a central pivot.
- Ransomes, Sims & Jefferies type D trolleybus No.9, built in 1926 with English Electric/RS&J equipment and a 31-seat single deck body, carried the registration number DX 5610. It originally has a front entrance and rear exit with 30 seats, but was rebuilt in the 1930s with rear access only. Withdrawn in October 1949, it then served as part of a house at Theberton until it was acquired by Ipswich Transport Museum in July 1972. In 2007 it was exhibited in "as found" condition.
- Ransomes, Sims & Jefferies type D trolleybus No.16, was built in 1926 and was part of the same batch as No. 9, carried the registration number DX 5617. It was upgraded with pneumatic tyres in the 1930s, and withdrawn from service in June 1950. Only the chassis survives.
- Richard Garrett & Sons type O trolleybus No.26, built in 1926 with a Strachans & Brown 31-seat single deck body, carried the registration number DX 5629. It was used as a summerhouse at Pin Mill following withdrawal in 1945, and was obtained for preservation by the Long Shop Museum at Leiston, but was loaned to the Ipswich Transport Museum in 1995 and subsequently donated to them in 2004. No.26 re-donated to the Long Shop Museum, Leiston in July 2021 and is currently being restored by the Museum volunteers in the former motor workshop. edited Oct 2022
- Ransomes, Sims & Jefferies trolleybus No.44, built in 1930 with a B31D dual entrance, carried the registration number DX 8871. It was owned by the Science Museum, London. Ownership transferred to the Ipswich Transport Museum in April 2022, arriving there on 22nd of that month.
- Ransomes, Sims & Jefferies trolleybus No.46, built in 1933 with English Electric equipment and an H24/24R double deck body, carried the registration number PV 817. It was shown at the Commercial Vehicle Show in 1933, and was one of the first batch of four double deck vehicles obtained by the corporation. After withdrawal from service in August 1951, it was used as a caravan at Needham Market before being acquired for preservation by the Ipswich Transport Museum in 1971. All of the electrical equipment needed to restore the vehicle had been amassed by 2007, but there were no immediate plans to start restoration.
- Karrier type W trolleybus No. 105, built in 1948 with Metrovick equipment and a Park Royal Vehicles H30/26R double deck body. carried the registration number PV 8270. After withdrawal, it was used as a mobile Civil Defence showroom and then as a canteen, until it was obtained by the Ipswich Transport Museum in 1971. An 11-year restoration project started in 2003, and the vehicle was returned to operational status in 2014, at a cost of some £25,000.
- Sunbeam type F4 trolleybus No. 126, built in 1950 with Metrovick equipment and a Park Royal H30/25R double deck body, carried the registration number ADX 196. It was sold to the Walsall system in 1962 for further use, and was obtained by the Ipswich Transport Museum in 1970 when that system closed. It was stored at the Sandtoft Trolleybus Museum for a time, where it ran occasionally, but subsequently moved to the East Anglia Transport Museum at Carlton Colville. It is now on static display at the Ipswich Transport Museum.

== See also ==
- History of Ipswich
- Transport in Ipswich
- List of trolleybus systems in the United Kingdom
