= Great Grimsby Street Tramways =

Former tramway in Lincolnshire, England

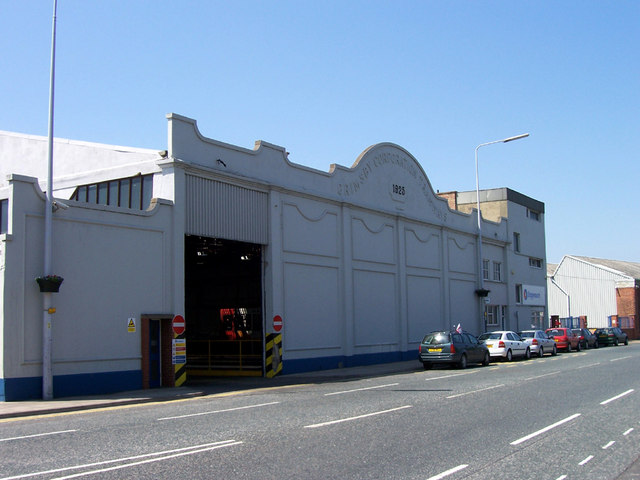
- The tram depot at Grimsby is now used by buses, but there are still tram rails in the floor.

Operation
- Locale: Grimsby and Cleethorpes
- Open: 4 June 1881
- Close: 17 July 1937
- Status: Closed

Infrastructure
- Track gauge: 1,435 mm (4 ft 8 1/2 in)
- Propulsion system(s): Horse, Electric

Statistics
- Route length: 6.3 miles (10.1 km)
Great Grimsby Street Tramways era: 1881–1936
Track gauge	1,435 mm (4 ft 8 1/2 in) standard gauge
Depot(s)	Carr Lane, then Pelham Road
Route length	6.3 miles (10.1 km)
Grimsby Corporation Tramways era: 1925–1937
Track gauge	1,435 mm (4 ft 8 1/2 in) standard gauge
Depot(s)	Victoria Street
Route length	4.39 miles (7.07 km)
Cleethorpes era: 1936–1937
Track gauge	1,435 mm (4 ft 8 1/2 in) standard gauge
Depot(s)	Pelham Road
Route length	1.91 miles (3.07 km)

The Great Grimsby Street Tramways Company was a tramway serving Grimsby and Cleethorpes in Lincolnshire, England. It was a subsidiary of the Provincial Tramways Company. They opened a horse tramway in 1881, running from the Wheatsheaf Inn in Bargate to the border with Cleethorpes, with a branch along Freeman Street, and extended the line into Cleethorpes in 1887. It followed the trend of many British systems, and was converted to an electric tramway in December 1901. Small extensions were made to the system at both ends, but the basic plan of the system remained the same throughout its life.

The company ran a mix of tramcars, some bought from new, four bought from the first public tramway to be built in London, and some built by the corporation, using trucks obtained from the Malleable Steel Castings Company. One unusual vehicle was an open-top single-deck toastrack car which was known as the Tram Coach. It only ran for four years, before it was sold to another system. After 1925, Grimsby Corporation bought second-hand vehicles from Sunderland, and Great Grimsby Street Tramways bought some from the Gosport and Fareham system.

Grimsby Corporation exercised their rights under the Tramways Act 1870 (33 & 34 Vict. c. 78) to buy the tramway within their boundaries after 21 years, and so the system was split in two in 1925, after negotiations were completed. They built a new depot from an aircraft hangar, but began replacing the tramway by trolleybuses and motorbuses soon after acquisition. The company were left with a small part of their original system, which they sold to Cleethorpes Urban District Council in 1936, along with their motorbuses. Cleethorpes converted the system to a trolleybus route just one year later, and trams finally stopped running on 17 July 1937.

== History ==
=== Great Grimsby Street Tramways Company (1881) ===
Great Grimsby Street Tramways Act 1879
- Act of Parliament
- Parliament of the United Kingdom
- Long title: An Act to incorporate the Great Grimsby Street Tramways Company; to authorise them to construct Tramways in the parishes of Great Grimsby and Clee, in the county of Lincoln; and for other purposes.
- Citation: 42 & 43 Vict. c. cxxvii

Dates
- Royal assent: 21 July 1879

Other legislation
- Repealed by: Humberside Act 1982

Status: Repealed

Text of statute as originally enacted

The Great Grimsby Street Tramways Company was a subsidiary of the Provincial Tramways Company, which had been set up in 1872 and owned a number of tramway systems, principally in the Portsmouth area, but also in London, Plymouth and Grimsby. They obtained the Great Grimsby Street Tramways Act 1879 (42 & 43 Vict. c. cxxvii), which authorised the construction of 3 miles (4.8 km) of horse tramway.

The tramway opened in 1881 using horse-drawn trams on standard gauge single track line with passing loops, stretching from Park Street, on the Grimsby/Cleethorpes boundary, to the Wheatsheaf Inn in Bargate, Grimsby. From the eastern terminus, it ran along Cleethorpes Road, passed the Alexandra Dock and reached the Wheatsheaf Inn by following Victoria Street and Deansgate. There was a short spur from Park Street to the depot, which was located on Carr Lane, and a branch that ran for about 1 mile (1.6 km) southwards from Riby Square, at the Grimsby end of Cleethorpes Road, following Freeman Street and Hainton Street. Plans for a link from this terminus to the Wheatsheaf Inn, thus creating a circular route, did not materialise. In order to provide the service, seven small open top double deck trams were purchased, with another two added to the fleet in 1882. The manufacturer of these vehicles is unknown, but it is possible that they were made by another one of the systems owned by Provincial.

Having been given authorisation by the Great Grimsby Street Tramways (Cleethorpes Extension) Order 1886, on 21 May 1887 the route was extended to Kingsway in Cleethorpes, the single track running along Grimsby Road to its junction with Poplar Road. The system was further extended on 4 September 1898, following further authorisation in the Great Grimsby Street Tramways Extension Order 1897, when double tracks were brought into operation, that ran down Isaacs Hill, along High Street and Alexandra Road to terminate on Cleethorpes seafront near Albert Road. The company built three open-top single deck toastrack cars, one in 1886 and two more in 1888, which were used on the extensions during the summer months. Although details are not known, they built or bought more cars as traffic levels grew, for they owned 14 in 1892, 16 in 1893, and around 20 by the time the system was replaced by an electric tramway.

Great Grimsby Street Tramways Act 1900
- Act of Parliament
- Parliament of the United Kingdom
- Long title: An Act to confer further powers upon the Great Grimsby Street Tramways Company with respect to the construction and working of tramways in the Borough of Grimsby and for other purposes.
- Citation: 63 & 64 Vict. c. cxxxvi

Dates
- Royal assent: 30 July 1900

Other legislation
- Repealed by: Humberside Act 1982

Status: Repealed

Text of statute as originally enacted

Around 1900, many horse tramways in Britain were being converted to electric traction, and Provincial were aware of this. They obtained the Great Grimsby Street Tramways Act 1900 (63 & 64 Vict. c. cxxxvi), which allowed them to carry out the work. Dick, Kerr & Co. of Preston were employed to reconstruct the system, which involved building a new depot and a generating station on Pelham Road, just off Grimsby Road, and doubling the track between Cleethorpes and Old Market Place in Grimsby, where a one-way detour was introduced. Horse trams continued to run throughout this period, and were withdrawn on 6 December 1901, with electric trams running the following day. At the Grimsby end, the section from Old Market to the Wheatsheaf Inn remained single track, and so was closed for a while, but when it re-opened on 15 February 1902, it included a 500-yard (460 m) extension eastwards to the gates of the People's Park on Welholme Road. A short extension in Cleethorpes opened on 12 July 1906, running along Alexandra Road and High Cliff. The Freeman Street branch continued to be single track.

Dick, Kerr carried out the conversion work, and for the opening, 22 open top double deck tramcars were obtained from Electric Railway and Tramway Carriage Works (ERTCW), which was a subsidiary company of Dick, Kerr. Another two identical vehicles were obtained in 1902. The next four vehicles came from the Alexandra Park Electric Railway, the first electric tramway to be built in London. They were built by Waggonfabrik Falkenreid of Hamburg for Elektrizitats-gesellschaft Wandruska, who built and ran the tramway, but when they became bankrupt in late 1899, a creditor seized its assets, and the four single-deck vehicles were acquired by Provincial. They were rebuilt at Grimsby with double-deck bodywork, Nos.25, 26 and 28 having open tops and No.27 having an enclosed upper deck. Two more open top trams were obtained from the original manufacturer in 1903, who also supplied a 1904-built covered tramcar in 1906, and a 1900-built single deck car in 1915, which had formerly worked on the Oldham system.

Some of the open-top trams were retained as such for use in the summer months, but many were later fitted with top covers. The company also owned six trailer cars, four of which had been built by ERTCW in 1899, but were designed so that they could be converted to electric trailer cars in due course, and two of which were original horse cars that had been adapted. They were towed by the motorised cars, and continued in use until 1918, when the two horse cars were sold to Lincoln Corporation Tramways, while the other four were converted to motorised cars by Dick, Kerr in 1920. The company also built an open-topped charabanc-style vehicle in 1922, which became known as the Tram Coach. The trailer cars were mainly used to provide extra capacity on football match days.

Under the provisions of the Tramways Act 1870 (33 & 34 Vict. c. 78), local authorities could buy tramways that operated within their boundaries after 21 years, and Grimsby Corporation decided to use these powers on 21 July 1922. However, things were not straightforward, and it was not until 6 April 1925 that they paid the company £109,848, gaining responsibility for the section within Grimsby. The company retained the depot and power station, the tram coach, and 13 of the tramcars, while Grimsby Corporation took the rest. The company built a new tram in 1925 and two more in 1926, but the final additions to the fleet were twelve open top cars dating from 1905, which they bought from the Gosport and Fareham system in 1930. That system was built to the slightly narrower gauge of 4 ft 7 3/4 in (1,416 mm), and the trucks had to be regauged before the vehicles could operate on the Grimsby system.

With the larger part of their system now operated by Grimsby Corporation, the company decided to sell the rest of it to Cleethorpes Urban District Council in 1935. They had been operating motor buses since 1909, and their motorbus fleet, together with the tramway, the power station, and the depot were included in the price of £50,000. The takeover was completed on 15 June 1936.

=== Grimsby Corporation Tramways (1925) ===
Under the terms of the Grimsby Corporation Act 1921 (11 & 12 Geo. 5. c. lxxvi), the corporation obtained control of the tramway within its boundaries from 6 April 1925. The purchase price included 22 trams, Nos.4 to 21 and 31 to 34, for which a new depot was completed in 1927 on Victoria Street. The front of the building was made of brick, but the storage area consisted of seaplane hangars, which had been moved from RNAS Killingholme after that facility closed in 1919. As the rolling stock was showing signs of age, the Corporation purchased sixteen Brush balcony tramcars from Sunderland District Electric Tramways. Much of the track was also in need of replacement, and the Corporation decided to run trolleybuses on the Freeman Street branch, as the conversion of the overhead wiring was cheaper than relaying the trackwork. The last trams ran on this route on 1 October 1926, with trolleybuses taking over the following day.

From 27 November 1927, the corporation also began running motorbus services, and these replaced the tramway between Old Market and the People's Park on 3 June 1928. Trams were replaced by trolleybuses on the Old Market to Riby Square section on 21 November 1936, leaving just five trams to work the through service to Cleethorpes. These lasted for another four months, and the final tram ran on 31 March 1937. The tram depot was subsequently used as a bus depot, and was still in use by Stagecoach Grimsby-Cleethorpes in 2017.

=== Cleethorpes Corporation Tramways (1936) ===
Cleethorpes had set its sights on replacing the tramway system when they obtained the Cleethorpes Urban District Council Act 1928 (18 & 19 Geo. 5. c. lxxvi), which gave them powers to operate the tramway and to replace it with trolleybuses. However, no further action was taken at the time, until Great Grimsby Street Tramways offered to sell them the remaining 1.91 miles (3.07 km) of the tramway which lay within their boundaries. They took over this section on 15 July 1936, and the sale price included the depot and 25 trams. They decided to apply a new livery of dark blue and primrose to the cars, and the ex-Oldham car No.38 carried it, but it is unclear whether it was applied to any other vehicles. Cleethorpes became a borough on 23 September 1936, and paper labels declaring that they were part of Cleethorpes Corporation Tramways were applied. They lasted under their new ownership for just a year, as the last tram ran on 17 July 1937, with trolleybuses taking over on the following day.

The trolleybus line was extended from the Kingsway tram terminus to Bathing Pool. Operation was transferred to the Grimsby Cleethorpes Transport Joint Committee in 1957, and trolleybuses were replaced by motor buses in 1960.

== Fleet ==
The first batch of trams were fitted with trucks made by J. G. Brill Company of Philadelphia and bodywork by Electric Railway and Tramway Carriage Works, with 34 seats on the upper deck and 22 on the lower deck. Car No.3 had its Brill truck replaced with an Angier Empire equaliser truck in 1902, but it reverted to a Brill truck subsequently. Top covers were fitted to 13 of this batch between 1908 and 1910, when seating on the upper deck was increased to 39. The vehicles affected were Nos.5 to 12 and 18 to 22. Nos.5, 6, 10 and 19 were fitted with new trucks and motors in 1908, and the original trucks and motors were used to replace the Falkenreid ones on the four vehicles obtained from the Alexandra Park Electric Railway. Nos.4 to 21 were transferred to Grimsby Corporation in 1925, while Nos 2, 3, and 22 had been withdrawn by 1929. No.1 was renumbered 11 in 1929, and had been withdrawn by the time the rest of the system was sold to Cleethorpes. Nos.23 and 24 were identical to the first batch, but had been fitted with fully-enclosed upper decks by 1904, though they were later converted to balcony tops. They were renumbered in 1929 and were among those sold to Cleethorpes.

The single-deck Falkenreid vehicles obtained in 1903 were rebuilt at Grimsby as open-top double deck trams, with the exception of No.27, which had a fully enclosed upper deck. It was rebuilt for a second time around 1910, when balcony ends were fitted to the upper deck. All had been withdrawn by 1925. Nos.29 and 30, obtained in 1903, initially had fully enclosed upper decks, but again were fitted with balcony ends. No.29 was sold to Cleethorpes, while No.30 had been withdrawn by 1929. No.37 had been built as an exhibition vehicle in 1904, and came to Grimsby in 1906, to be sold to Cleethorpes 30 years later, while No.38, which also went to Cleethorpes, had been built in 1902 and acquired from Oldham Corporation in 1915. In 1920, four horse trailer cars dating from 1899 were converted to electric operation, and passed to Grimsby Corporation in 1925.

Between 1922 and 1928, the company built one single-deck and eight double-deck trams using trucks supplied by the Malleable Steel Castings Company of Pendleton, Lancashire. No.40 was an open-top single-deck vehicle, known as the Tram Coach, which was built in 1922 and withdrawn in 1925, when it was sold for further use on the Portsdown and Horndean Light Railway, another system owned by Provincial. Of the rest, No.39 was fitted with a top cover in 1926, and all were sold to Cleethorpes. The final batch were bought second-hand from Gosport and Fareham Tramways in 1929, when that system closed. It was another network owned by Provincial, and the vehicles dated from 1905 to 1906. Nos.2, 3, 27, and 30 had been fitted with top covers by 1933, and all were sold to Cleethorpes.

Electric trams

Car numbers	Type	In Service	Withdrawn	Trucks	Bodywork	Notes
1–22	4-wheel DD open top	1901		Brill 21E	ERTCW 34/22	
23-24	4-wheel DD open top	1902		Brill 21E	ERTCW 34/22	
25,26,28	4-wheel DD open top	1903		Falkenried	Grimsby 34/22	
27	4-wheel DD enclosed	1903		Falkenried	Grimsby 35/28	
29-30	4-wheel DD open top	1902		Brill 21E	ERTCW 34/22	
37	4-wheel DD open top	1906		Brill 21E	ERTCW 34/22?	
38	4-wheel SD saloon	1915		Brill 21E	ERTCW 26	ex-Oldham
31-34	4-wheel DD open top	1920		Brill 21E	ERTCW 33/20	ex-Trailer cars
40	4-wheel SD open top	1922	1925	MSCC 21E	Grimsby 40	the "Tram Coach"
39	4-wheel DD open top	1925		MSCC 21E	Grimsby	
35-36	4-wheel DD open top	1926		MSCC 21E	Grimsby	
57-59	4-wheel DD open top	1927		MSCC 21E	Grimsby	
40,60	4-wheel DD open top	1928		MSCC 21E	Grimsby	
1-3,22-30	4-wheel DD open top	1929		Brill 21E	Brush 33/22	ex-Gosport & Fareham
Grimsby Corporation Tramways
41-56	4-wheel DD balcony	1925	1926-1937	Brush	Brush	ex-Sunderland

== See also ==
- Great Grimsby and Sheffield Junction Railway (Grimsby-New Holland)
- Grimsby and Immingham Electric Railway (Grimsby-Immingham)
- Barton and Immingham Light Railway (Immingham-Barton upon Humber)
- Trolleybuses in Cleethorpes
- Trolleybuses in Grimsby
