= Trolleybuses in Manchester =

Public transport system in Manchester, England

Manchester trolleybus system
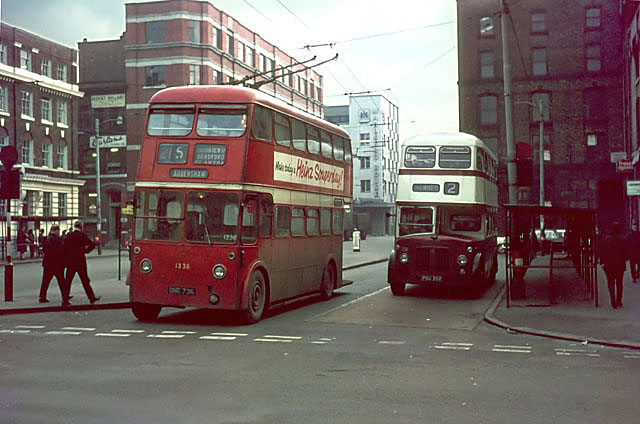
- A Manchester trolleybus departing from the Stevenson Square terminus, 30 December 1966, the day before the final service.

Operation
- Locale: Manchester, England
- Open: 1 March 1938
- Close: 31 December 1966
- Status: Closed
- Routes: 9
- Operator: Manchester Corporation Transport

Infrastructure
- Stock: 189 (maximum)

The trolleybus system in Manchester, England, opened on 1 March 1938, and gradually replaced certain routes of the Manchester tramway network. Manchester was a belated convert to trolleybuses having already started a programme of tram to diesel bus conversion in the mid-1930s and this, overall, continued to be the preferred option for tram conversion that was completed in 1949.

By the standards of the various now defunct trolleybus systems in the United Kingdom, the Manchester system was a large one, with a total of 9 routes, and a maximum fleet of 189 trolleybuses. It closed on 31 December 1966.

Manchester's trolleybuses were also on certain routes jointly operated with the Ashton-under-Lyne trolleybus system, between 1925 and 1966.

Two former Manchester trolleybuses are preserved, one at the Greater Manchester Transport Museum, Cheetham Hill, and another at the Trolleybus Museum in Sandtoft, Lincolnshire.

== See also ==
- History of Manchester
- Transport in Manchester
- List of trolleybus systems in the United Kingdom
