= AEC 663T =

British three-axle double deck trolleybus chassis

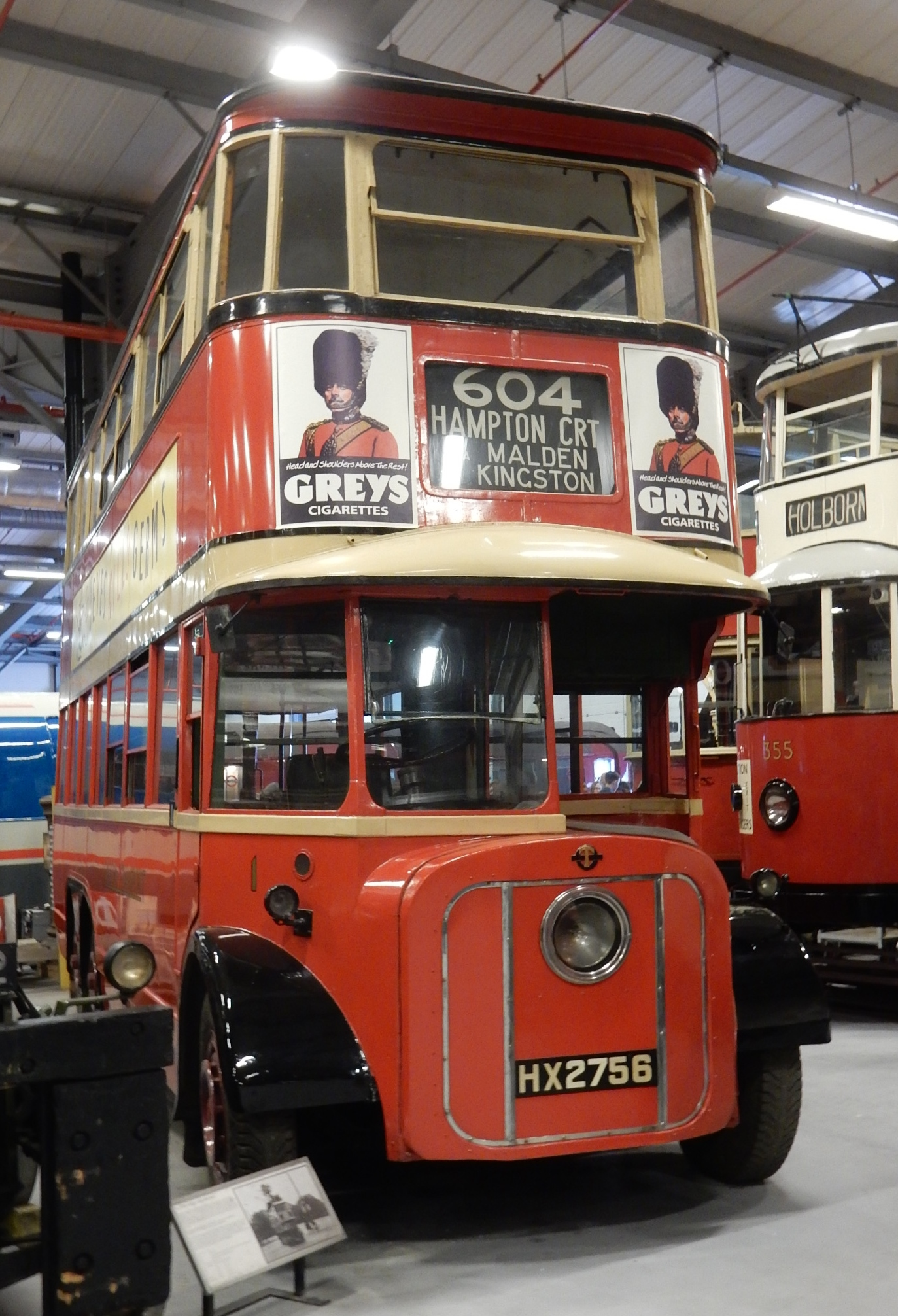
- Preserved AEC 663T at the London Transport Museum Depot

Overview
- Manufacturer: AEC
- Production: 1931 - 1937

Body and chassis
- Doors: 1
- Related: AEC Renown

The AEC 663T was a three-axle double deck trolleybus chassis manufactured by AEC between 1931 and 1937. Based on the AEC Renown three axle bus chassis, three demonstrators were bodied by English Electric in 1930. Eighty-three were built for English operators including 60 for London United Tramways. Other users included the municipal trolleybus systems in Walsall, Birmingham, Huddersfield, Portsmouth and Grimsby.

London United Tramways fleet number 1 is preserved by the London Transport Museum.
