= Trolleybuses in Nottingham =

Nottingham trolleybus system
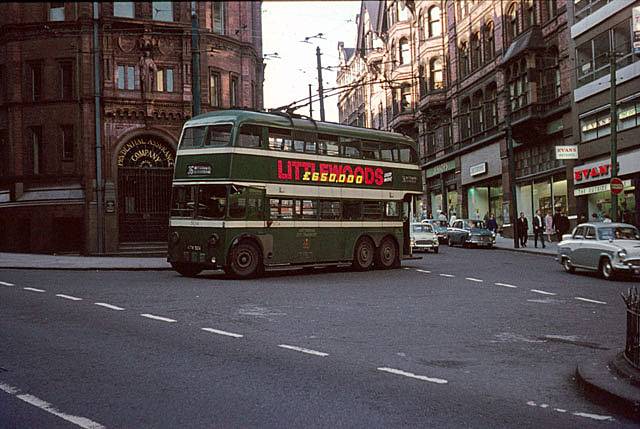
- Nottingham trolleybus at the King Street terminus, April 1966

Operation
- Locale: Nottingham, Nottinghamshire, England
- Open: 10 April 1927
- Close: 30 June 1966
- Status: Closed
- Routes: 8
- Operators: Nottingham Corporation Tramways (1927–1936); Nottingham City Transport (1936–1966)

Infrastructure
- Stock: 157 (maximum)

The Nottingham trolleybus system once served the city of Nottingham, in the county of Nottinghamshire, England. It opened on 10 April 1927, and gradually replaced the Nottingham tramway network.

By the standards of the various now-defunct trolleybus systems in the United Kingdom, the Nottingham system was a medium-sized one, with a total of 8 routes, and a maximum fleet of 157 trolleybuses. It was closed on 30 June 1966.

Nottingham was also served by another system, the Nottinghamshire and Derbyshire trolleybus system, which was in operation between 1932 and 1953.

Six of the former Nottingham system trolleybuses and parts of a seventh are preserved. Two of them are in a private collection in Boughton, Nottinghamshire, while another four and a fifth chassis are at the Trolleybus Museum at Sandtoft, Lincolnshire, England.

== History ==
Nottingham Corporation had operated an electric tramway system since 1897, when they took over the network of horse-drawn routes run by Nottingham & District Tramways. In 1913, they obtained an act of Parliament to authorise additions to that system. Although trolleybuses were in their infancy, the bill included powers to operate trolleybuses between Market Place and Trent Bridge, and onwards to West Bridgford. The second half of the route was contested by West Bridgford Unrban District Council. It was not included in the act, although it did include powers to run trolleybuses along any of the tram routes in due course. The powers were not exercised at the time.

While much of the tramway had double tracks, there were some parts where there was only a single track, and it was these sections that were the first to be converted to trolleybus operation. Officials visited Birmingham in 1924 and were sufficiently impressed that they obtained powers to operate trackless vehicles on Nottingham Road. An order was placed with Railless for ten double-deck vehicles, with bodywork by Short Bros (Rochester and Bedford) Ltd. The new service commenced on 10 April 1927, running along Nottingham Road from the city centre to New Basford. The new venture was heralded by a new livery, the predominantly maroon paintwork of the existing trams and motor buses being replaced by green. The ten trolleybuses included the last nine built by Railless before they ceased producing them in favour of more lucrative work, so when the Corporation needed eight extra vehicles, they bought them from Ransomes, Sims & Jefferies of Ipswich.

The next extension to the network was a cross-town route, running from Wilford Road in the south to Wells Road in the north. The overhead wiring was extended beyond the original tram terminus along Wells Road to Kildare Road. Twelve more vehicles were purchased, six from English Electric and another six from Ransomes. The public service began on 23 February 1930. In order to assess the suitability of vehicles for further extensions to the system, the Corporation hired four trolleybuses in 1931, one each from Associated Equipment Company (AEC), Guy Motors, Karrier and Thornycroft. As a result of the trials, the first of several orders was placed with Karrier, although Ransomes also supplied additional vehicles.

By the time they submitted a bill to Parliament in 1930, the corporation had grand visions of what the system might become and sought powers to convert all of the remaining tram routes, and to extend the trolleybus routes, in several cases to well beyond the city limits. However, there was opposition from Nottinghamshire County Council and Trent Motor Traction, and only those routes within the city limits were authorised. The first of the new routes to open was to Wollaton Park, including the replacement of motor buses on Ilkeston Road, with services starting on 29 November 1931. Next came the route to Carlton on 29 November 1932, and the section from Nottingham Road to Cinderhill on 25 July 1933.

In addition to corporation trams in the city, the trams of the Nottinghamshire and Derbyshire Tramways Company also ran between the city centre and Ripley, along the route from Nottingham Road to Cinderhill. They too had been replacing their trams with trolleybuses, and the wiring on the final section between Heanor and Cinderhill was completed to allow through running to begin on 5 October 1933. Although the corporation ran a limited service to Cinderhill, the main service on that section was provided by Notts & Derby, whose trolleybuses reached the city centre via Nottingham Road and Mansfield Road, rather than the more southerly route along Radford Road and Alfreton Road which the trams had used. Trolleybus operation began on the Bulwell and Bulwell Hall Estate route on 13 May 1934, followed by the route to Colwick Road and that along London Road to Trent Bridge on 2 June 1935.

There was then a period of uncertainty, after a new general manager was appointed in 1934, who was less favourably disposed towards electric traction. The tram routes to Mapperley and Arnold were replaced by motorbuses, with the final trams on the Arnold route running on 16 September 1936, just a little short of the 39th anniversary of the opening of the tram system. Two years later there was serious discussion about abandoning the trolleybus system, but another change of management occurred, and the idea was shelved. The vehicles that were in service in 1939 were renumbered, by adding 300 to the original fleet numbers. Traffic levels increased during the Second World War, and to meet the need at a time when most factories were engaged in war work, four AECs were borrowed from Cleethorpes, two English Electrics from Southend-on-Sea, six Guys from Hastings, and a Daimler demonstrator from Kingston upon Hull. In 1942, five trolleybuses with utility bodywork were obtained from Sunbeam Commercial Vehicles, and subsequent utility vehicles came from Karrier.

The value of electric traction was appreciated in 1943, when wartime conditions made it difficult to obtain sufficient fuel for motorbuses. Plans were developed for an extension to the route to Carlton, to form a loop running along Main Street, Burton Road, Conroy Road, and Station Road, to Post Office Square. Plans for an extension to Wollaton were shelved because of the difficulties of running a joint service with private companies. The Notts & Derby Company withdrew its plans for a route to Wollaton after the Corporation objected, and revived plans for a Wollaton route by both Notts & Derby and the Corporation in 1947 failed when each objected to the other's scheme.

=== Post-war development ===
A new cross-city service was introduced in 1946, running between Nottingham Road and Trent Bridge, but it was withdrawn after only five years, when the Notts & Derby Company ceased to run services into Nottingham in April 1953. Plans to re-equip the system began in 1946, when 14 Karrier and three British United Traction (BUT) 2-axle trolleybuses were purchased. BUT supplied the remainder of the trolleybuses bought for the system, when 102 three-axle vehicles bought between 1949 and 1952 enabled the entire pre-war fleet to be replaced. These were the largest vehicles that ran on the system, with seating for 70 passengers, and the fleet grew to its maximum size at this time, with 155 vehicles in service.

Following the withdrawal of the Notts & Derby service between Ripley and the city centre on 25 April 1953, the Corporation reorganised some of its routes, to maintain a service to Cinderhill. A decision was taken to abandon trolleybuses in favour of motorbuses in 1961, and although this was expected to take until 1968, events hastened the demise of the system a little. The Trent Bridge to Wollaton Park was the first to be replaced, when trolleybus operation ended on 3 November 1962. The closure programme was accelerated when it was decided to replan the town centre, and most services were replaced during 1965. Motorbuses took over the Trent Bridge to Bulwell Market service on 1 April, and the Cinderhill to Trent Bridge route on 1 May. The Bulwell Hall Estate to Colwick Road route was the next to go, with motorbuses running from 1 June, while the Wollaton Park to Carlton route was replaced on 1 October. The rest of the trolleybuses were withdrawn on 9 October, with the exception of those running along the original route to Nottingham Road, opened in 1927. Public service on that route lasted until 30 June 1966, and a ceremonial last run took place the following morning, to mark the demise of the system after 39 years.

== Fleet ==
List of vehicles
Fleet numbers	Type	In service	Withdrawn	Chassis	Electrical equipment	Bodywork	Notes
1-10	2-axle	1927	1934-35	Railless	English Electric	Short H26/26R	
11-12	2-axle	1928	1936	Ransomes D	Ransomes/BTH	Ransomes H26/26R	
13-18	3-axle	1930	1946	Ransomes D6	Ransomes/BTH	Ransomes H32/28R	
19-24	2-axle	1930	1946	AEC/English Electric	English Electric	English Electric H30/26R	
25–36	3-axle	1932	By 1950	Karrier-Clough E6	BTH	Park Royal H30/30R	
37-49	3-axle	1932	By 1950	Ransomes D6	Ransomes/BTH	Brush H32/28R	
50	2-axle	1930	By 1952	Karrier-Clough	BTH	Park Royal H30/26R	
1	3-axle	1933	By 1952	Karrier E6A	BTH	Brush H30/26R	
51-60	3-axle	1934	By 1952	Karrier E6	English Electric	Metro-Cammell H34/30R	
61-85	3-axle	1934	By 1952	Karrier E6	English Electric	Brush H34/30R	
86-106	3-axle	1934	By 1952	Ransomes D6	Ransomes/BTH	Brush H34/30R	
107-136	3-axle	1935	By 1952	Leyland TTB4	GEC	MCW H34/30R	
437-440	2-axle	1940	1952	AEC 661T	English Electric	Park Royal H30/26R	ex Cleethorpes
302-303	3-axle	1940	By 1952	English Electric	English Electric	English Electric H30/26R	ex Southend-on-Sea
441	2-axle	1941	1952	Daimler CTM4	Metrovick	Weymann H28/26R	ex demonstrator
304-309	3-axle	1941	1946	Guy BTX	Rees-Stevens	Ransomes B32C	ex Hastings
442-445	2-axle	1943-44	1960-62	Karrier W	English Electric	Weymann UH30/26R	
447-451	2-axle	1942	1957-58	Sunbeam MF2	BTH	Weymann UH30/26R	
452-454	2-axle	1944	1957-62	Karrier W	English Electric	Park Royal UH30/26R	
455-458	2-axle	1944	1960	Karrier W	English Electric	Weymann UH30/26R	
459-465	2-axle	1945	1962-65	Karrier W	English Electric	Roe UH30/26R	
466-468	2-axle	1945	1962-65	Karrier W	English Electric	Brush UH30/26R	
469-478	2-axle	1946	1962-65	Karrier W	BTH	Park Royal H30/26R	
479-482	2-axle	1948	1965	Karrier W	BTH	Roe H30/26R	
483-495	2-axle	1948	1963-65	BUT 9611T	English Electric	Roe H30/26R	
500-524	3-axle	1949-50	1965-66	BUT 9641T	English Electric	Brush H38/32R	
525-601	3-axle	1951-52	1965-66	BUT 9641T	various	Brush H38/32R	

Bus bodywork designations: key
Prefixes

U	Wartime utility bodywork
B	Bus body single deck
C	Coach body single deck
D	Dual purpose single deck
H	Highbridge body, central upper gangway
L	Lowbridge body, offset sunken upper gangway

Numbers

n	Single deck or total seating
x / y	Upper deck followed by lower deck seating

Suffixes

C	Centre entrance
F	Front entrance
R	Rear entrance
D	Dual entrance

=== Preservation ===
Six Nottingham Corporation trolleybuses and parts of a seventh have been preserved. Karrier E6 No.67, later No. 367, entered service in 1934, and was withdrawn in 1950. It was sold to a farm in Lincolnshire, but was rescued in 1974, and moved to The Trolleybus Museum at Sandtoft. After many years of waiting, restoration was progressing well in 2014. Another Karrier, No. 466, entered service in 1945. It had wartime utility bodywork but remained in service until 1962. It was then obtained by the Nottingham Trolleybus Group, and after a period in store at Plumtree, moved to Sandtoft in July 1973, by which time it was in a poor state. Much of the bodywork was rebuilt, in part using components from a West Bridgford motor bus, which had a similar body. After a period when no more work was carried out, ownership was transferred to the museum, and restoration was nearly complete in 2014.

Trolleybus No.493 was manufactured by British United Traction and appeared at the Commercial Motor Show in London in 1948. It was the only one of a batch of 13 that was fitted with fluorescent lighting and BTH automatic acceleration. After withdrawal from service in 1965, it was acquired by Nottingham Trolleybus Group and stored in the Nottingham area. It was then moved to Sandtoft and is used occasionally to give rides to the public. The final complete vehicle at Sandtoft is No. 506, the trolleybus used to commemorate the demise of the system on 1 July 1966. It was purchased for the Huddersfield Trolleybus Preservation Society and the Bradford Model Railway Centre, but was subsequently bought by a private owner, and moved to the museum in 1974. It is now owned by the museum and is regularly used on open days. Two more of the final batch of 102 BUT vehicles are privately owned and stored at Boughton in Nottinghamshire.

The Sandtoft museum also owns the chassis of No. 46, a Ransomes, Sims & Jefferies three-axle vehicle dating from 1932. It was withdrawn in 1950, and sold for use as a store at Faldingworth, Lincolnshire. Its remains were auctioned in 1999, and the museum paid £24 for the chassis, minus its front axle, and a collection of body parts from the collapsed body, which it was hoped might be useful for the restoration of No. 367. It is stored in the open, where it can be seen by the visiting public.

== See also ==
- Nottingham City Transport
- History of Nottingham
- Transport in Nottingham
- List of trolleybus systems in the United Kingdom
