= Trolleybuses in Nottinghamshire and Derbyshire =

Nottinghamshire and Derbyshire trolleybus system

Nottinghamshire and Derbyshire trolleybus system

Operation
- Locale: Nottingham, Nottinghamshire and Ripley, Derbyshire, England
- Open: 7 January 1932
- Close: 25 April 1953
- Status: Closed
- Routes: 3
- Operator: Nottinghamshire and Derbyshire Tramways Company

Infrastructure
- Stock: 32 (maximum)

The Nottinghamshire and Derbyshire trolleybus system once linked the city of Nottingham, in the county of Nottinghamshire, England, with Ripley, in the neighbouring county of Derbyshire. Opened on 7 January 1932, it replaced the Nottinghamshire and Derbyshire tramway, between the same termini.

By the standards of the various now-defunct trolleybus systems in the United Kingdom, the system was a small and short-lived one, with a total of three routes, and a maximum fleet of 32 trolleybuses. It was closed relatively early, on 25 April 1953.

Three of the former Notts & Derby system trolleybuses are now preserved, one of them at the Trolleybus Museum at Sandtoft (although not currently on display), and the other two in a private collection in Boughton, Nottinghamshire.

The city of Nottingham was also served by the Nottingham trolleybus system, in operation between 1927 and 1966. A Derby trolley bus network also existed from 1932 to 1967, having also taken over from tramcars. It finished when extensive roadworks made alterations to the overhead wiring uneconomic.

== See also ==
- History of Nottingham
- Transport in Nottingham
- List of trolleybus systems in the United Kingdom
