= Trolleybuses in Derby =

Derby trolleybus system
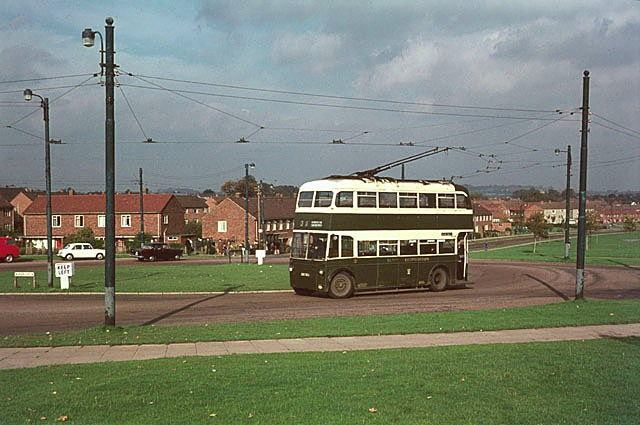
- A Derby trolleybus at the Morden Green terminus in the Mackworth Estate, October 1966.

Operation
- Locale: Derby, Derbyshire, England
- Open: 10 January 1932
- Close: 9 September 1967
- Status: Closed
- Routes: 11
- Operator: Derby Corporation Transport

Infrastructure
- Stock: 73 (maximum)

The Derby trolleybus system once served Derby, the former county town of Derbyshire in central England. The trolleybus service started in 1932 and ran until 1967.

== History ==
The Derby trolleybus system opened on 10 January 1932, and it gradually replaced the Derby tramway network. The trolleybus system was opened just a year after London United Tramways, although nearby Nottingham had started using trolleybuses five years before. The trolleybuses operated by Derby Corporation led to the last Derby tram being eventually withdrawn from regular routes at the end of June with a special last journey on 2 July 1934.

By the standards of the various, now defunct, trolleybus systems in the United Kingdom, the Derby system was a medium-sized one, with a total of 11 routes, and a maximum fleet of 73 trolleybuses. The system was much cheaper to run than motorbuses but the end was signalled when proposed extensions to the network were blocked by protest to the additional poles and cabling that would be required. The system was closed on 9 September 1967.

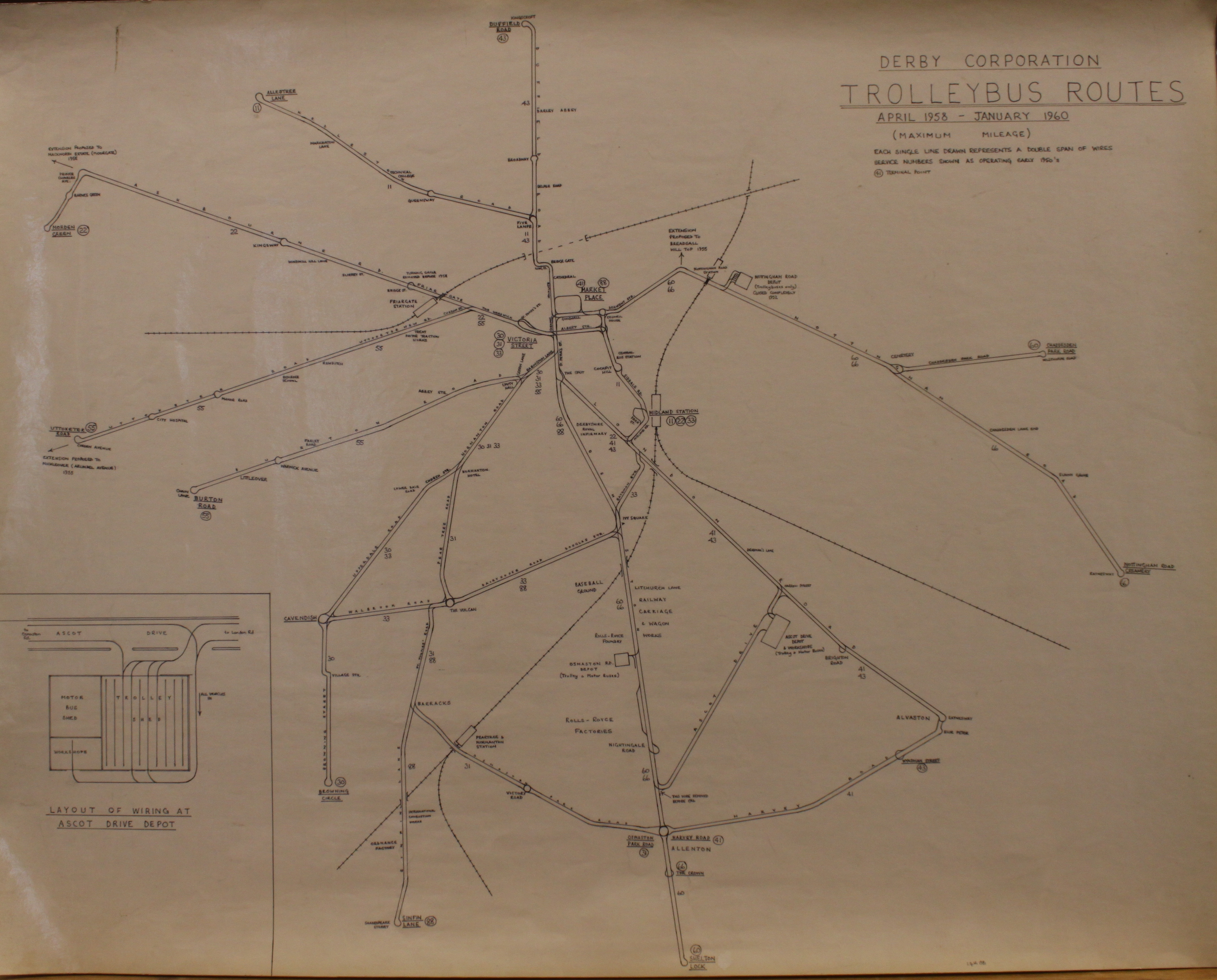
map of trolleybus routes from late 1950s

There were over the years 165 Derby trolleybuses although this figure includes six that were second-hand. Five of the former Derby system trolleybuses are now preserved. One of them is at the Trolleybus Museum at Sandtoft in Lincolnshire, a second one is kept at the Westgate Transport Museum, Belton, near Sandtoft, and a third is based (but privately owned) at the East Anglia Transport Museum, Carlton Colville, Suffolk. The other two are privately owned and stored at unknown locations in the UK.

== Services ==
Route 22 extended to the outer ring road until 1952, when it was extended to the Mackworth Estate. This route continued until the trolleybus operation closed in 1967. The picture shows a trolleybus at the end of this route.

== Culture ==
A Derby Corporation Roe trolleybus was die cast in 1:76 scale by the Corgi Toy company. The limited-edition model advertised the Wardwick Restaurant and electricity. The indicator display was for route 22 to Prince Charles Avenue. As the model bus had Roe coachwork then it would have been a trolleybus made after 1960.

== See also ==
- History of Derby
- Transport in Derby
- List of trolleybus systems in the United Kingdom
