= Trolleybuses in Bradford =

Bradford trolleybus system

Bradford trolleybus system
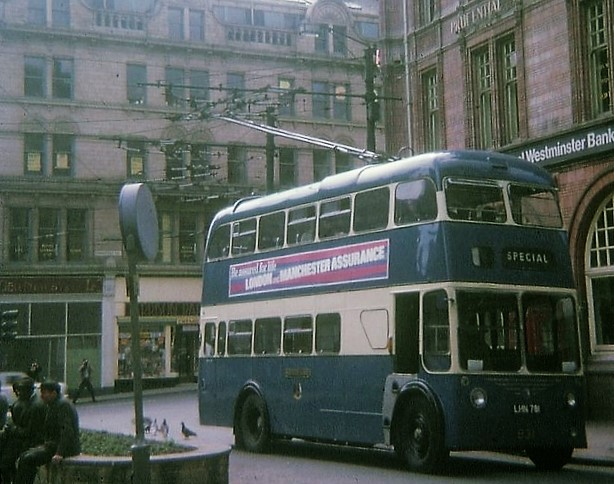
- A trolleybus in Bradford's city centre

Operation
- Locale: Bradford, Yorkshire, England
- Open: 1911
- Close: 1972
- Status: Closed
- Routes: 17

Infrastructure
- Electrification: (?) V DC parallel overhead lines
- Stock: 187 (maximum)

Bradford Corporation Trolley Vehicles Order Confirmation Act 1912
- Act of Parliament
- Parliament of the United Kingdom
- Long title: An Act to confirm a Provisional Order made by the Board of Trade under the Bradford Corporation Act 1910 relating to Bradford Corporation Trolley Vehicles.
- Citation: 2 & 3 Geo. 5. c. cxviii

Dates
- Royal assent: 7 August 1912

Other legislation
- Repealed by: West Yorkshire Act 1980
- Relates to: Bradford Corporation Act 1910

Status: Repealed

Text of statute as originally enacted

Bradford Corporation (Trolley Vehicles) Order Confirmation Act 1925
- Act of Parliament
- Parliament of the United Kingdom
- Long title: An Act to confirm a Provisional Order made by the Minister of Transport under the Bradford Corporation Act 1910 relating to Bradford Corporation trolley vehicles.
- Citation: 15 & 16 Geo. 5. c. xi

Dates
- Royal assent: 27 March 1925

Other legislation
- Repealed by: West Yorkshire Act 1980
- Relates to: Bradford Corporation Act 1910

Status: Repealed

Text of statute as originally enacted

Bradford Corporation (Trolley Vehicles) Order Confirmation Act 1928
- Act of Parliament
- Parliament of the United Kingdom
- Long title: An Act to confirm a Provisional Order made by the Minister of Transport under the Bradford Corporation Act 1910 relating to Bradford Corporation trolley vehicles.
- Citation: 18 & 19 Geo. 5. c. lxvi

Dates
- Royal assent: 3 August 1928

Other legislation
- Repealed by: West Yorkshire Act 1980
- Relates to: Bradford Corporation Act 1910

Status: Repealed

Bradford Corporation (Trolley Vehicles) Order Confirmation Act 1930
- Act of Parliament
- Parliament of the United Kingdom
- Long title: An Act to confirm a Provisional Order made by the Minister of Transport under the Bradford Corporation Act 1910 relating to Bradford Corporation Trolley Vehicles.
- Citation: 20 & 21 Geo. 5. c. cxxxix

Dates
- Royal assent: 1 August 1930

Other legislation
- Repealed by: West Yorkshire Act 1980
- Relates to: Bradford Corporation Act 1910

Status: Repealed

Text of statute as originally enacted

Bradford Corporation (Trolley Vehicles) Order Confirmation Act 1953
- Act of Parliament
- Parliament of the United Kingdom
- Long title: An Act to confirm a Provisional Order made by the Minister of Transport under the Bradford Corporation Act 1910 relating to Bradford Corporation trolley vehicles.
- Citation: 1 & 2 Eliz. 2. c. xxi

Dates
- Royal assent: 14 July 1953

Other legislation
- Repealed by: West Yorkshire Act 1980
- Relates to: Bradford Corporation Act 1910

Status: Repealed

Text of statute as originally enacted

Bradford Corporation (Trolley Vehicles) Order Confirmation Act 1954
- Act of Parliament
- Parliament of the United Kingdom
- Long title: An Act to confirm a Provisional Order made by the Minister of Transport and Civil Aviation under the Bradford Corporation Act, 1910, relating to Bradford Corporation trolley vehicles.
- Citation: 2 & 3 Eliz. 2. c. xxxvii

Dates
- Royal assent: 30 July 1954

Other legislation
- Repealed by: West Yorkshire Act 1980
- Relates to: Bradford Corporation Act 1910

Status: Repealed

Bradford Corporation (Trolley Vehicles) Order Confirmation Act 1958
- Act of Parliament
- Parliament of the United Kingdom
- Long title: An Act to confirm a Provisional Order made by the Minister of Corporation Transport and Civil Aviation under the Bradford Corporation Act 1910 relating to Bradford Corporation trolley vehicles.
- Citation: 6 & 7 Eliz. 2. c. xxix

Dates
- Royal assent: 23 July 1958

Other legislation
- Relates to: Bradford Corporation Act 1910

The Bradford trolleybus system served the city of Bradford, Yorkshire, England for much of the 20th century. It was one of the first two trolleybus systems to be opened in the United Kingdom, along with the Leeds system.

Both systems commenced operations on 20 June 1911. However, the public service on the Bradford system did not start until four days later.

In the early years, Bradford designed its own trolleybuses, based on chassis from David Brown & Sons of Huddersfield, with bodies built in the company's own workshops.Twenty four single deckers were constructed between 1913 and 1921, of which 6 were supplied to Leeds. Two single deckers were also built on chassis from Kirkstall Forge, these comprising a two axle vehicle in 1920 and a three axle (twin steer) vehicle in 1922. Six further single deckers with Kirkstall Forge / AEC chassis were constructed in 1923, after which Bradford purchased trolleybuses from other commercial suppliers.

The Bradford system lasted the longest of all the UK's urban trolleybus systems. Having been one of the first two such systems to open, it was also the last one to close, on 26 March 1972. Just before its closure, it was also the longest-lived surviving trolleybus system in the world, but with the Bradford closure that distinction passed to the Shanghai, China, trolleybus system, opened in 1914.

Many of the former Bradford trolleybuses are now preserved at various locations around the UK, including eleven of them at the Trolleybus Museum at Sandtoft, Lincolnshire.

== See also ==
- Transport in Bradford
- List of trolleybus systems in the United Kingdom
