= AEC 661T =

British two-axle double deck trolleybus chassis

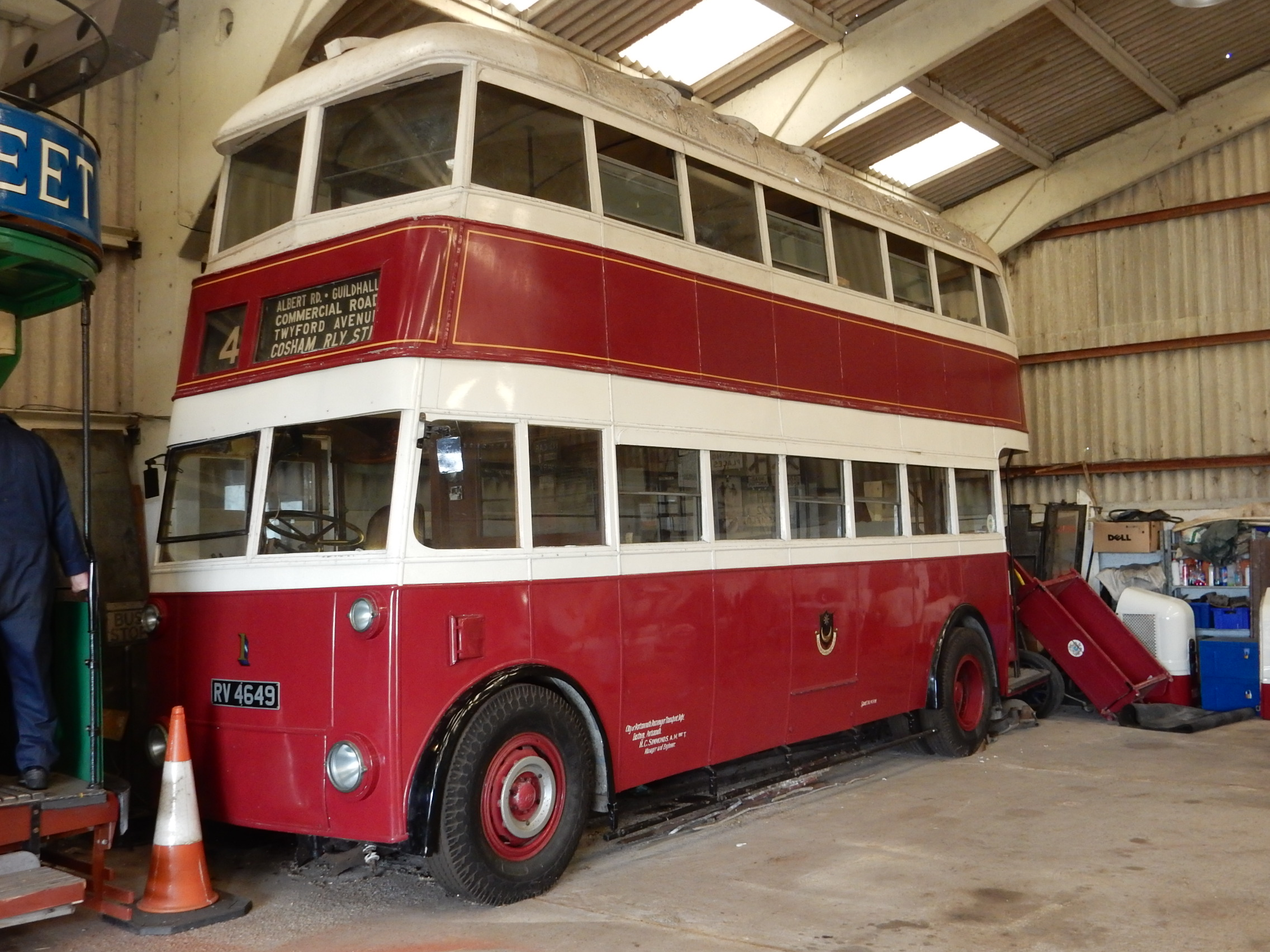
- Preserved AEC661T trolleybus

Overview
- Manufacturer: AEC
- Production: 1931 - 1942

Body and chassis
- Doors: 1
- Related: AEC Regent; AEC 662T

The AEC 661T was a two-axle double deck trolleybus chassis manufactured by AEC between 1931 and 1942. Based on the AEC Regent bus chassis, over 380 were built for United Kingdom and overseas operators. Bodywork on early models was similar to that on the AEC Regent motor bus, with a half cab front and dummy radiator, but a full-fronted version was used from 1934.

The first four vehicles were supplied to Southend Corporation., with orders following to many other municipal trolleybus operators.

Several AEC 661Ts were later preserved, including examples formerly used in Portsmouth Cleethorpes, and Reading, with the latter two being located at the Trolleybus Museum at Sandtoft.
