= Trolleybuses in Ashton-under-Lyne =

Ashton-under-Lyne trolleybus system
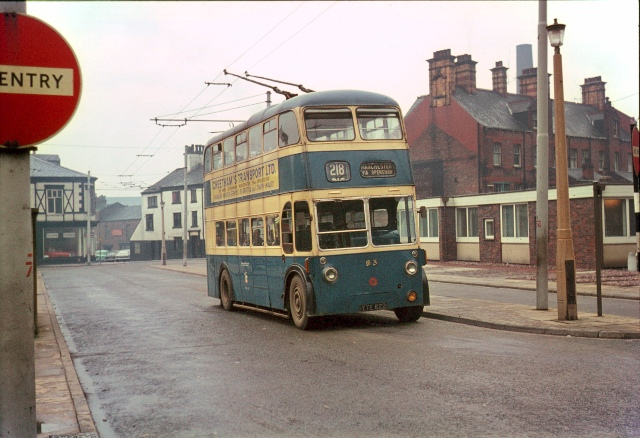
- An Ashton-under-Lyne trolleybus at Stalybridge Bus Station, 30 December 1966

Operation
- Locale: Ashton-under-Lyne, Tameside, England
- Open: 26 February 1925
- Close: 31 December 1966
- Status: Closed
- Routes: 5
- Operator: Ashton Corporation Transport

Infrastructure
- Stock: 19 (maximum)

The Ashton-under-Lyne trolleybus system once served the market town of Ashton-under-Lyne, now in the Metropolitan Borough of Tameside, Greater Manchester, north west England.

Opened on 26 February 1925, the Ashton system gradually replaced the Ashton-under-Lyne tramway network. By the standards of the various now-defunct trolleybus systems in the United Kingdom, it was a small one, with a total of only five routes, and a maximum fleet of 19 trolleybuses. It was closed on 31 December 1966.

The Ashton trolleybus system also served the city of Manchester.

Two of the former Ashton system trolleybuses are now preserved. One of them is at the Greater Manchester Transport Museum in Cheetham, Manchester, and the other one is based at the East Anglia Transport Museum, Carlton Colville, Suffolk.

== See also ==
- History of Manchester
- Transport in Manchester
- List of trolleybus systems in the United Kingdom
