= Trolleybuses in Perth =

Former bus transport in Perth, Western Australia

Perth trolleybus system
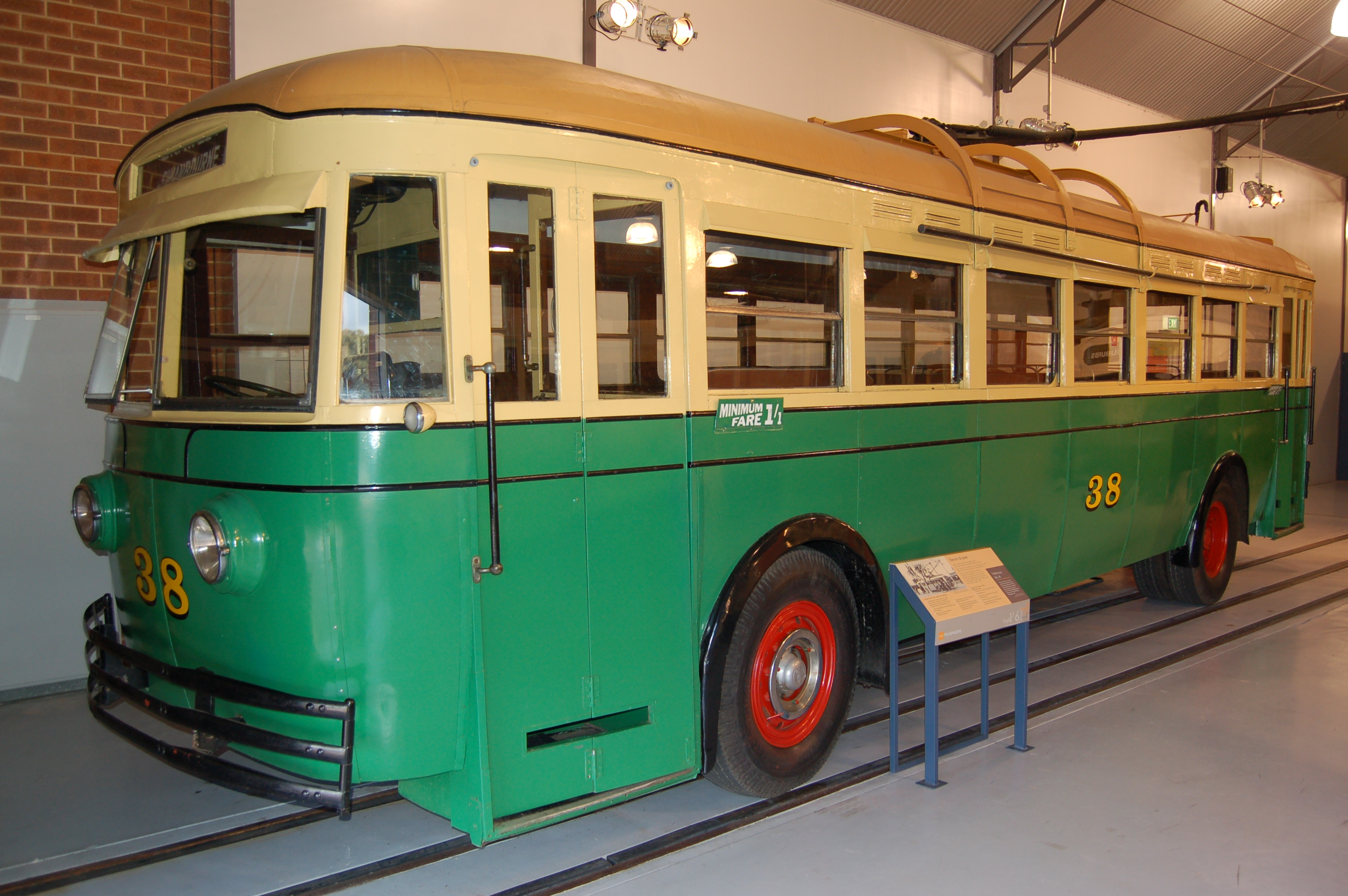
- Preserved Midland Railway Workshops bodied Leyland TB5 no 38 at Whiteman Park in 2011

Operation
- Locale: Perth, Western Australia

Statistics
Trolleybus era: 1933–1969
- Status: Closed
- Owner: Government of Western Australia
- Operators: Western Australian Government Railways (1933-1949); Western Australian Government Tramways & Ferries (1949-1960); Metropolitan Transport Trust (1960-1969)
- Electrification: (?) V DC parallel overhead lines
- Stock: 90

The Perth trolleybus system in Western Australia linked the capital Perth's central business district with its inner suburbs on the northern side of the Swan River. It was the first permanent trolleybus network to open in Australia, in 1933, and also the last to close, in 1969.

== History ==
The first trolleybus route commenced operating on 1 October 1933 between East Perth and West Leederville station via Wellington Street. It was the first permanent trolleybus network in Australia, Adelaide having commenced a trial service in May 1932. In 1938 it was extended along Cambridge Street to a balloon loop at Keane Street, Wembley while in the same year, a new route to Claremont via Mounts Bay Road and Stirling Highway was established replacing a tram route. A branch from the Wembley route to the intersection of Grantham and Reserve Streets via Gregory Street was a new route not previously served by trams.

In the late 1940s, it was proposed that trolleybuses replace tram routes to Victoria Park, Welshpool, South Perth and Como. However, overhead wires were considered an unsightly blight on the new Causeway Bridge so motor buses were introduced instead.

On 8 August 1951, trams were replaced on the Mount Hawthorn line from William Street in the city, The Claremont route was extended along Stirling Highway to the Swanbourne fire station and Wembley routes along Louth Road and Dumfries Road to Floreat Park. In 1959, trolleybuses replaced trams on the routes to Mount Lawley, extending beyond tram territory to Dianella via Grand Promenade and to Bedford Park. In the same year, the Swanbourne route was replaced by motor buses in connection with road works associated with the interchange at the city end of Narrows Bridge.

The Mount Hawthorn route closed on 17 March 1963, the Beaufort Street routes at the end of 1968 when Barrack Street was made one-way northbound, and the remaining routes to Floreat Park on 29 August 1969.

== Fleet ==
To commence operations, three Leyland TTBs were landed at Fremantle on 10 June 1933. One had been bodied by Park Royal, with the other two bodied locally by the Midland Railway Workshops. When the network was extended in the late 1930s, a further 12 Leyland TTBs (later extended to 19) were ordered, again with the first bodied by Park Royal and the balance by Midland Railway Workshops. A further 18 Leyland TB5s originally destined for Canton, China were bodied by Midland Railways Workshops.

In 1950/51, 50 Sunbeam F4s entered service; 10 bodied by Commonwealth Engineering in Sydney with the balance under sub-contract by Boltons in Perth.

The Perth trolleybus fleet was as follows:

Image	Fleet nos.	Quantity	Chassis	Body	Configuration	In service
	1	1	Leyland TTB	Park Royal	Three axle, front and rear entrance	1933–c 1960
	2–3	2	Leyland TTB	Midland Railway Workshops	Three axle, front and rear entrance	1933–c 1960
	4	1	Leyland TTB	Park Royal	Three axle, dual entrance	1938–c 1960
	5–22	18	Leyland TTB	Midland Railway Workshops	Three axle, front and rear entrance	1938–c 1960
	23–40	18	Leyland TB5	Midland Railway Workshops	Two axle, dual entrance	1942/45–1962/64
	41–50	10	Sunbeam F4	Commonwealth Engineering	Two axle, centre entrance	1950/53–1967/69
	51–90	40	Sunbeam F4	Boltons	Two axle, centre entrance	1950/53–1967/69

Some former Perth trolleybuses are now preserved by the Perth Electric Tramway Society at its heritage tramway in Whiteman Park.

== See also ==
- Buses in Perth

== Sources ==
- Campbell, Bob (1999). Getting There by Tram in Western Australia. Mount Lawley: Perth Electric Tramway Society. ISBN 0646-38447-3.
- Culpeffer-Cooke, Tony; Gunzburg, Adrian; Pleydell, Ian (2010). Tracks by the Swan: The Electric Tram and Trolleybus Era of Perth, Western Australia. Mount Lawley: Perth Electric Tramway Society. ISBN 978-0-9807577-0-5.
- Francis, Ric (August 1999). "The Trolleybus System of Perth, Western Australia (1933-1969): Australia's First Trolleybus System" (PDF). Trolley Wire (278): 16–21.
- Francis, Ric (November 1999). "The Trolleybuses of Perth" (PDF). Trolley Wire (279): 22–24.
- Francis, Ric (2008). Destination West Leederville: A history & pictorial review of the Perth trolley bus system. Mount Lawley: Perth Electric Tramway Society. ISBN 978-0-9805116-3-5.
- Jones, David (2000). Australian Trolley Buses: the trolley buses that once served Australian cities. Tawa, NZ: City Tramway Publications. ISBN 0-473-07118-5.
