= Trolleybuses in Coimbra =

Coimbra trolleybus system
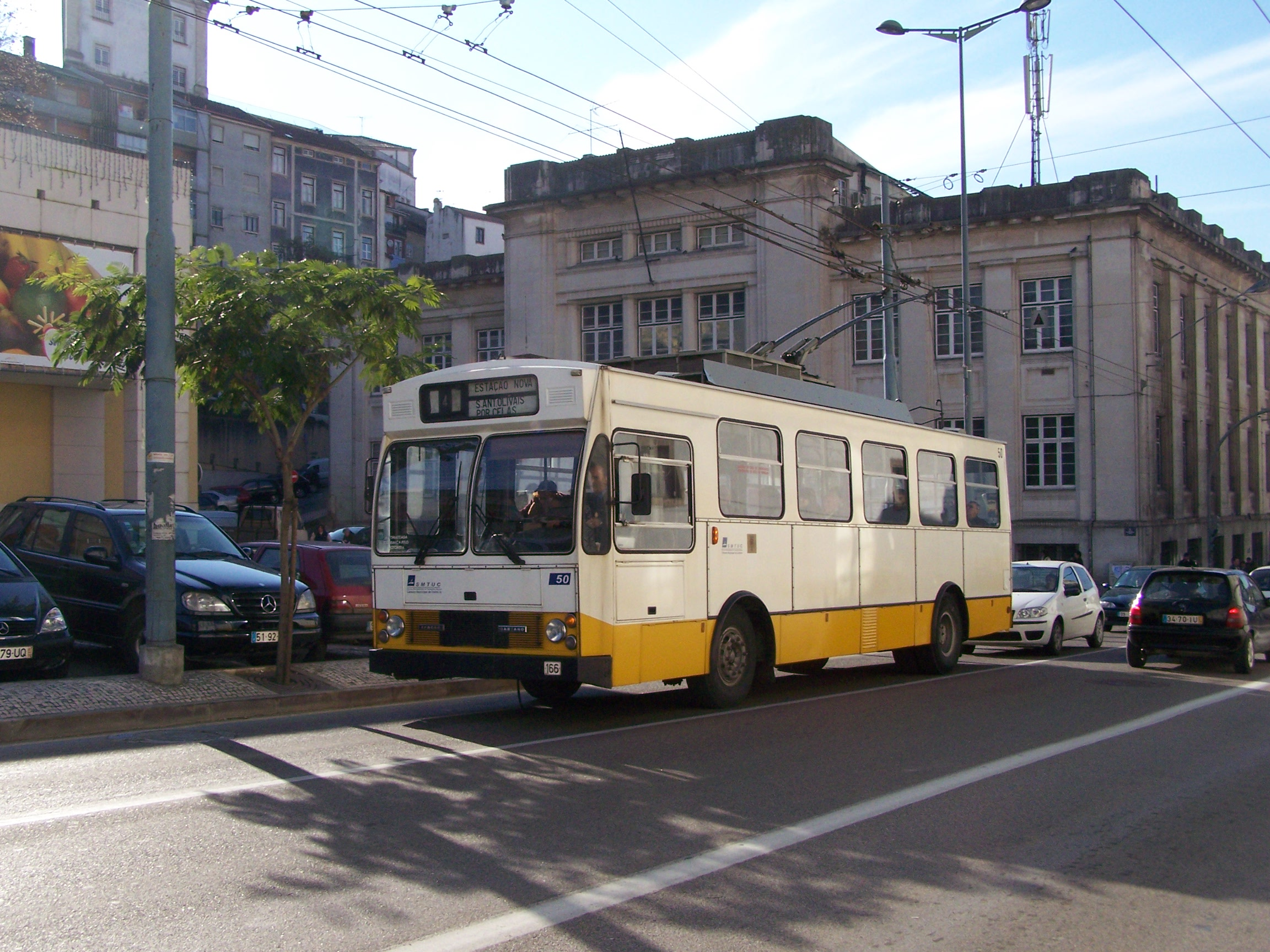
- A Caetano/EFACEC trolleybus in Coimbra, 2006

Operation
- Locale: Coimbra, Portugal
- Open: 16 August 1947
- Status: Closed (temporarily suspended March 2021; made permanent July 2024)
- Routes: 2
- Operator: SMTUC

Infrastructure
- Electrification: 600 V DC

Statistics
- Website: http://www.smtuc.pt SMTUC (in Portuguese)

The Coimbra trolleybus system (Portuguese: Rede de Tróleis de Coimbra) formed part of the public transport network in the city of Coimbra, Portugal. Opened in 1947, it supplemented, and then eventually replaced, the Coimbra tramway network. Service was suspended in March 2021 because of road construction, and officials stated that the suspension was temporary, but in late 2022 the mayor indicated that any resumption of trolleybus service would not occur until after completion of construction of a new Bus Rapid Transit line (to be called Metro Mondego), around late 2024. However, in July 2024, the city council voted not to resume service – to make the suspension a permanent closure – albeit with a proposal floated for a future tourist trolleybus operation along the banks of the Mondego River, without further detail given.

== History ==
Trolleybus service was inaugurated in Coimbra on 16 August 1947 with two Saurer 3TP trolleybuses. The original operator was Serviços Municipalizados de Coimbra (SMC), a municipal authority that had operated the city's tram system since 1920 and also managed the provision of water and gas.

Initially, the trolleybus system only partially replaced Coimbra's tramway network, but after several decades of concurrent operations the latter was closed, in January 1980.

Until 1959, the Coimbra trolleybus system was the only one in Portugal. After the closure of the Porto system in 1997, that was again the case.

With effect from 1 January 1985, SMC's responsibility for water and sanitation services was moved to a new, separate authority, and the now transport-only authority was renamed Serviços Municipalizados de Transportes Urbanos de Coimbra (SMTUC). Six trolleybus routes were in operation in 1988 (1, 3–6, and 8).

In March 2021, all trolleybus service was suspended, initially because of road works and later because of disruptions caused by construction of a Bus Rapid Transit line (named Metro Mondego). The suspension was originally intended to be temporary, but in July 2024 the city council voted to make it permanent.

== Lines ==
In its last years, the system had two lines, 4 and 103. Although suspended (operated by motorbuses) since 2021, their overhead wiring was being kept intact except for short sections affected by the BRT construction, as both routes were expected to resume after the latter is completed. However, the temporary suspension was made permanent in July 2024.

== Fleet ==
=== Past fleet ===
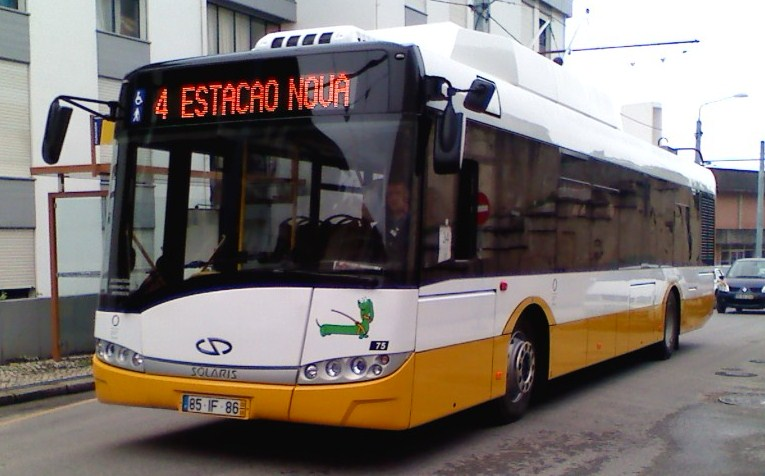
The system's solitary Solaris Trollino, in 2009

The initial two-member Saurer fleet was augmented in 1949, with the acquisition of six new buses from Sunbeam Commercial Vehicles. The vehicles supplied were based on Sunbeam's MF2B model, with two axles and a wheelbase of 16.25 feet (4.95 m). They were fitted with single-deck bodywork by Park Royal Vehicles, with 40 seats and room for 35 standing passengers. In order to enable them to be operated by just the driver, they included an overhang of 8.25 feet (2.51 m) beyond the front axle, allowing the entrance door to be mounted just behind the windscreen, so that payment could be made to the driver when entering the vehicle. To cope with the steep gradients of the Coimbra system, they were fitted with 125 horsepower (93 kW) 600-volt motors, and each trolleybus carried two compressors, normally designed to work together, but each capable of maintaining the air supply for braking and door operation if one should fail. Three more Sunbeam Park Royals joined the fleet in 1956.

Subsequent procurements included 10 BUT RETB/1s (four in 1958 and six in 1961), and six further Sunbeams in 1965.

=== Fleet in last years ===
The Coimbra trolleybus fleet during the last years of service was as follows:

- 10 (of originally 20) conventional (two-axle) Caetano/EFACEC vehicles, built between 1984 and 1986.
- 1 secondhand conventional Caetano/EFACEC trolleybus (with auxiliary diesel engine), borrowed from the closed Porto system (No. 71). This vehicle was returned to Porto in 2012. An articulated trolleybus built by the same manufacturer at around the same time was also borrowed from the operator of the former Porto system, from 2001 to 2009 (No. 70).
- 1 conventional Solaris Trollino, the system's first and only low-floor trolleybus, delivered in 2009 (No. 75).

== See also ==
- List of trolleybus systems
- Metro Mondego
