= List of town tramway systems in Portugal =

This is a list of town tramway systems in Portugal. It includes all tram systems in Portugal, past and present; cities with currently operating systems, and those systems themselves, are indicated in bold and blue background colored rows. The use of the diamond (♦) symbol indicates where there were (or are) two or more independent tram systems operating concurrently within a single metropolitan area. Those tram systems that operated on other than standard gauge track (where known) are indicated in the 'Notes' column.

| Location | Relevant Wikipedia Article | Traction Type | Date (From) | Date (To) | Notes |
|---|---|---|---|---|---|
| Braga | | Mule | 20 May 1877 | 1914 | |
| Braga | | Steam | 25 Mar 1882 | 1914 | |
| Braga | | Electric | 19 Oct 1914 | 20 May 1963 | |
| Coimbra | | Mule | 17 Sep 1874; 1 Jan 1904 | 1883; 1910 | Gauge: 1,000 mm (3 ft 3 3/8 in) |
| Coimbra | | Electric | 1 Jan 1911 | 9 Feb 1980 | Gauge: 1,000 mm (3 ft 3 3/8 in); Reintroduction planned (LRT) |
| Figueira da Foz | | Mule | Aug 1876 | 1930 | (goods from Dec 1875) |
| Figueira da Foz | | Steam | 1883 | 1926 | |
**↘ Lisbon**
| ♦ Lisbon | Trams in Lisbon | Mule | 17 Nov 1873 | 10 Aug 1902 | |
| ♦ Lisbon | Trams in Lisbon | Steam | 1889 | 1892 | |
| ♦ Lisbon | Trams in Lisbon | Cable | 14 Aug 1890 | 3 Jul 1913 | Gauge: 900 mm (2 ft 11 7/16 in) |
| ♦ Lisbon | Trams in Lisbon | Electric | 31 Aug 1901 | | Gauge: 900 mm (2 ft 11 7/16 in) |
| ♦ Almada – Seixal | Metro Transportes do Sul | Electric | 30 Apr 2007 | | Light rail. |
| ♦ Sintra | Trams in Sintra | Electric | 31 Mar 1904 | | Gauge: 1,000 mm (3 ft 3 3/8 in). Operation suspended 15 Sep 1974 – 15 May 1980; now mainly a tourist service, operates five days a week and with a reduced winter timetable. King and Price (1995), page 63, state that the reasons for the 1974–1980 suspension are not clear, but mention financial difficulties, management changes, labor unrest, and the political turmoil which followed the Carnation Revolution of 25 Apr 1974. |
**↘ Porto**
| ♦ Porto | Trams in Porto | Mule | 19 Mar 1872 | 1903 | |
| ♦ Porto | Trams in Porto | Steam | 1878 | 9 Nov 1914 | |
| ♦ Porto | Trams in Porto | Electric | 12 Sep 1895 | | First electric tramway on Iberian Peninsula. Tram system reached its maximum in 1949, but the tramway continually shrank through the 1990s; remaining system operated as a heritage tramway. |
| ♦ Metro do Porto | Porto Metro | Electric | 7 Dec 2002 | | Light rail. |
| Povoa de Varzim – Vila do Conde | | Mule/Steam | 15 Oct 1874 | Oct 1934 | Steam powered during later years. |

== See also ==
- Trams in Portugal
- List of town tramway systems in Europe
- List of tram and light rail transit systems
- List of metro systems
