= Trams in Lisbon =

Public transportation system

Lisbon tramway network
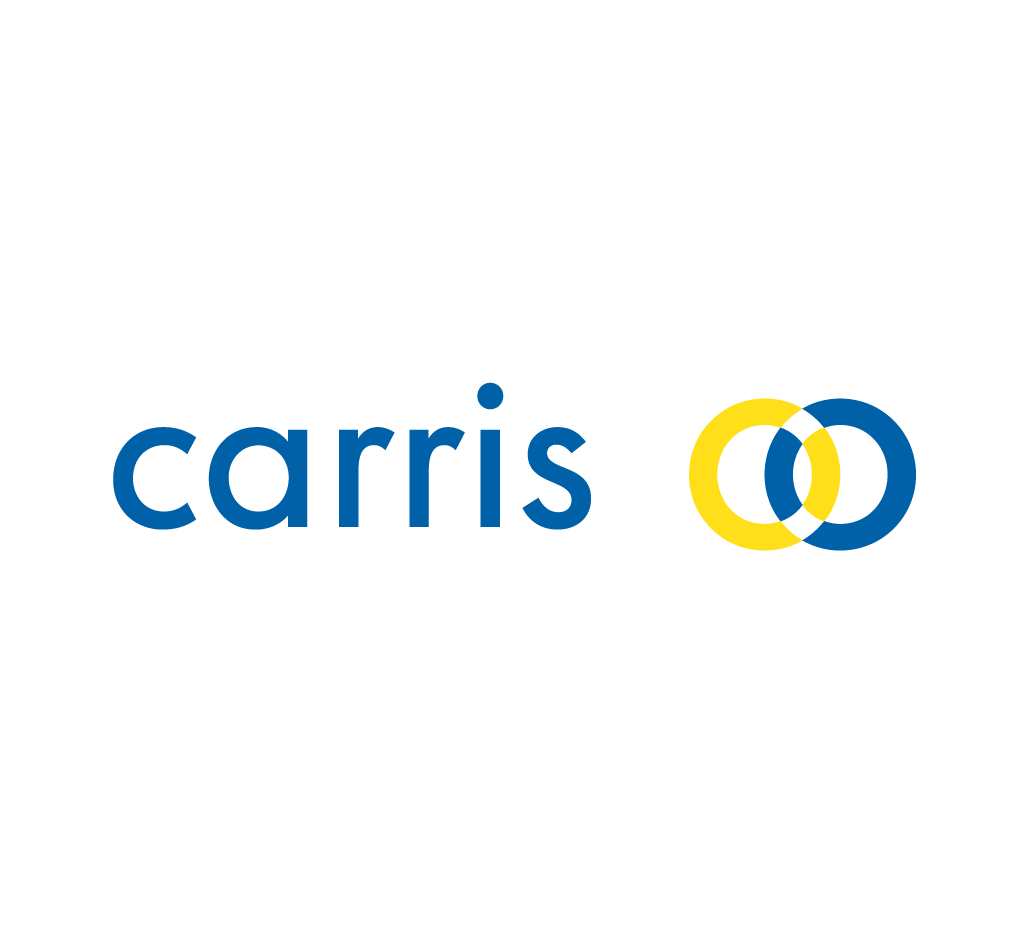

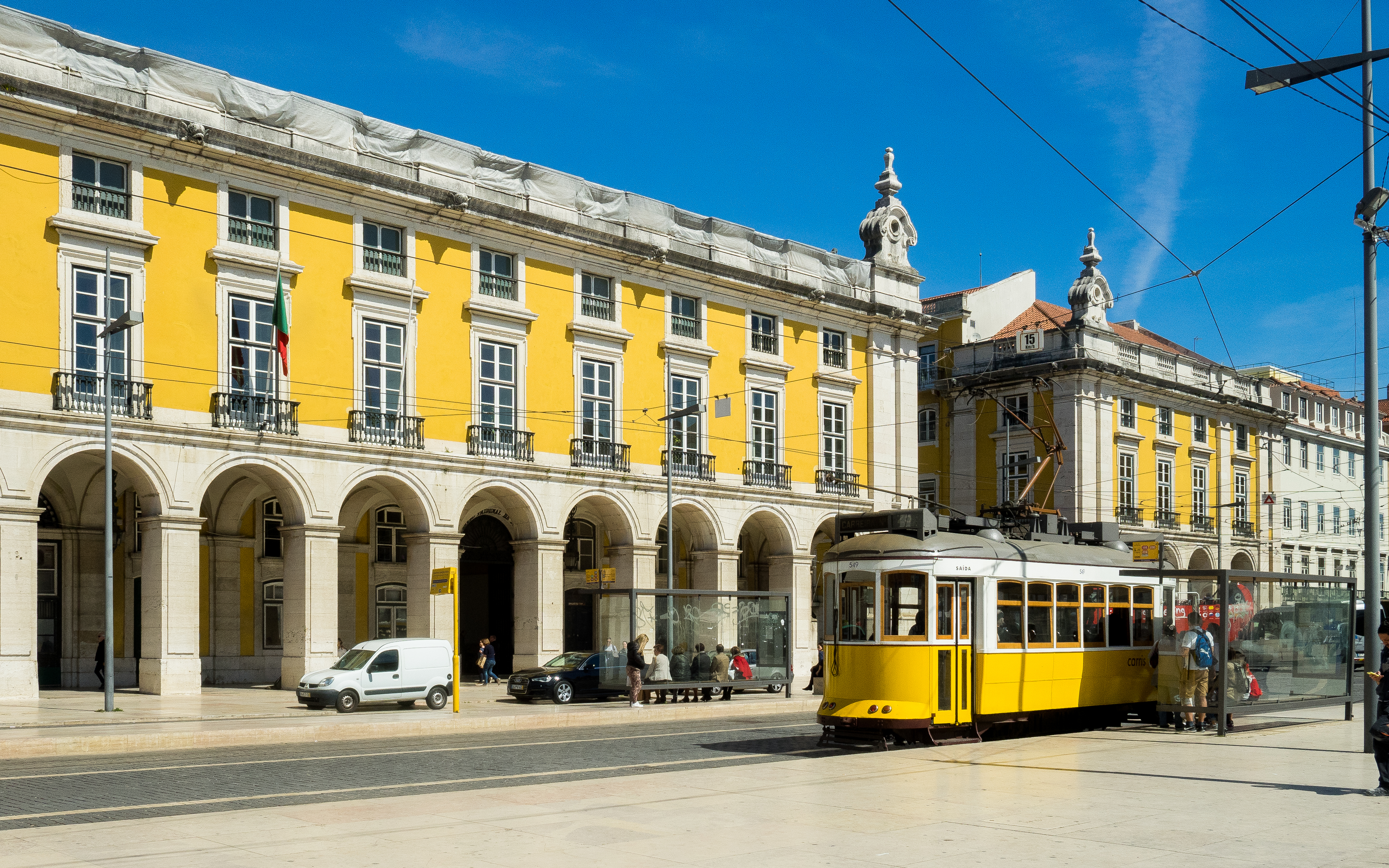
- A Lisbon Tram stopped at Praça do Comércio

Operation
- Locale: Lisbon, Portugal

Statistics
Horsecar era: 1873–1902
- Track gauge: 1,435 mm (4 ft 8 1/2 in) standard gauge (to 1888); 900 mm (2 ft 11 7/16 in) (from 1888)
- Propulsion systems: Horses; Experimental steam
Electric tram era: since 1901
- Status: Open
- Routes: 27 (maximum); 6 (present)
- Operator: Carris
- Track gauge: 900 mm (2 ft 11 7/16 in)
- Electrification: 600 V DC overhead lines
- Depots: Santo Amaro; Amoreiras (to 1981); Arco de Cego (1902-1996)
- Route length: 76 km (47 mi) (maximum)); 31 km (19 mi) (present)
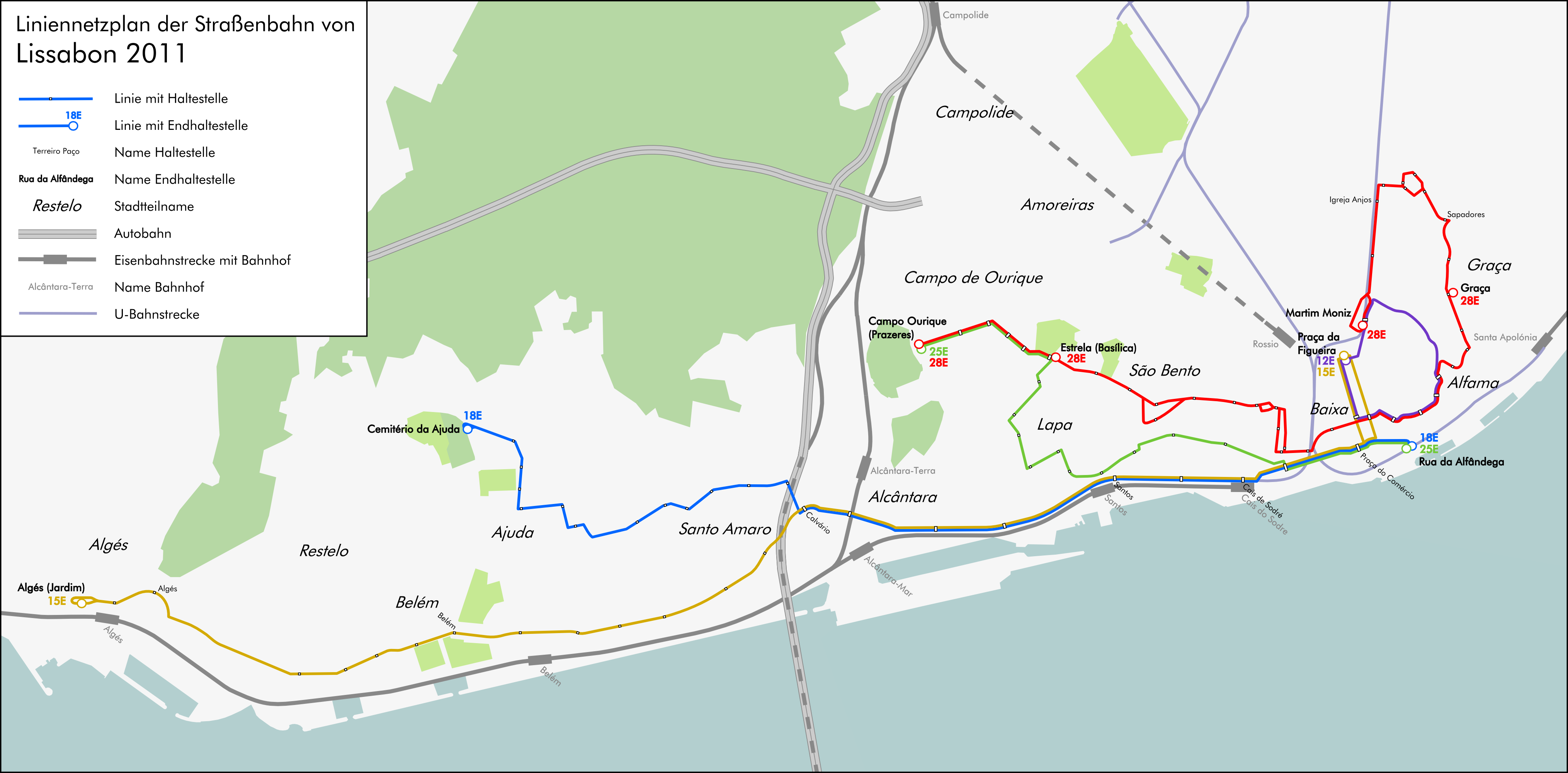
- Website: http://www.carris.pt/ Carris (in Portuguese and English)

The Lisbon tramway network (Portuguese: Rede de elétricos de Lisboa) is a system of trams that serves Lisbon, the capital city of Portugal. In operation since 1873, it presently comprises six lines. The system has a length of 31 km, and 63 trams in operation (45 historic "Remodelados", 8 historic "Ligeiros" and 10 modern articulated trams). The depot is located in Santo Amaro, in Alcântara.

== History ==
=== Steam guided-rail ===
In January 1870 the Duke of Saldanha, a Portuguese statesman, opened a guided-rail street tramline between Lisbon and Lumiar, using the Larmanjat system. He built this at his own expense to encourage investment in his Lisbon Steam Tramways Company venture. He raised enough capital to extend the lines as far as Sintra and Torres Vedras, but the company failed and the lines closed in April 1875.

=== Origin of municipal system ===
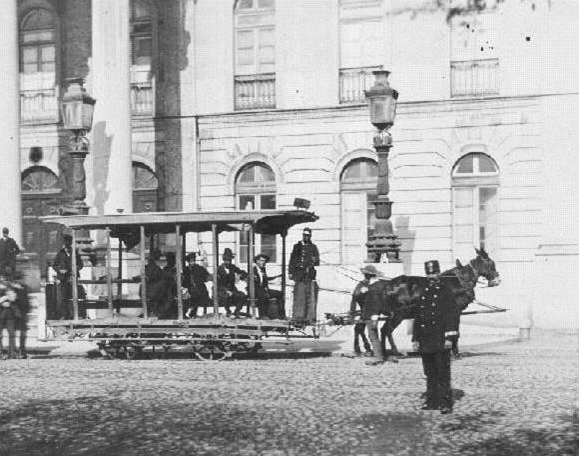
Horsecar (americano) at Rossio

Lisbon's municipal government wished to develop urban transit and granted concessions to build and operate various systems that included funiculars and tramways. The first tramway in Lisbon entered service on 17 November 1873 as a horsecar line. The vehicles, called americanos after their point of origin, were initially deployed in the flat parts of the city where animals were capable of hauling their passenger loads.

=== Cable trams ===
To surmount the steep slopes where draft animal conveyance was impossible, funiculars were envisioned in proposals made to the municipal government in 1882. The first of them started operating in 1884. This inaugurated the era of cable-driven transport, but the technology of electrical generation, transmission and power was developing concurrently and would eventually supersede it.

Cable tram services (or cable cars) afforded an alternative to funiculars for the longer and curved routes required to follow Lisbon's streets. Individual vehicles grasp a steel cable that runs continuously in a channel below the roadway surface. The transport company that ran the funiculars applied for and received the concessions to operate cable trams and from 1890 initially proposed two routes based on plans by the Portuguese engineer Raoul Mesnier du Ponsard, who had already designed Lisbon's funiculars. In all, three lines operated in the city. Each had a 900 mm (2 ft 11 7/16 in) gauge, corresponding to that of the extant americanos. The rolling stock on the Estrela and Graça lines were built by Maschinenfabrik Esslingen; the São Sebastião cars apparently were designed by Maschinenfabrik Esslingen but built in Portugal.

==== Elevador da Estrela ====
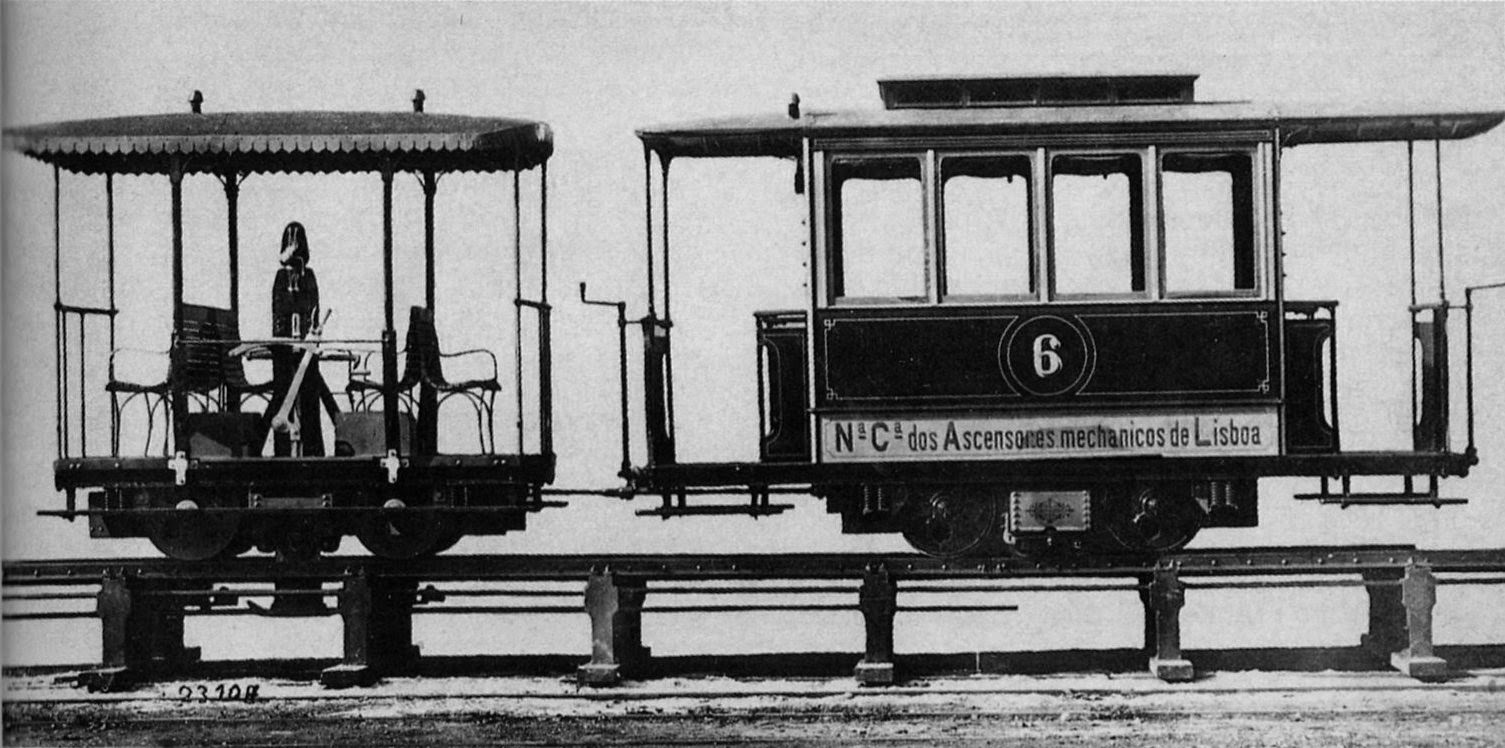
Equipment used on the Estrela line

The first line, put into operation on 15 August 1890, was 1.7 kilometres (1.1 mi) long and ran from Praça Camões to Largo da Estrela. At the Estrela terminal, the company set up a small depot where the steam-operated powerhouse was also located. Rolling stock consisted of a tug and trailer. Since single-ended vehicles were used on the Estrela route, there was a turntable there and a turning loop (raquette) at Praça Camões. The service ran until 1913 when it was rendered economically unviable by competing electric trams. Its former route is now part of 28E's.

==== Elevador da Graça ====
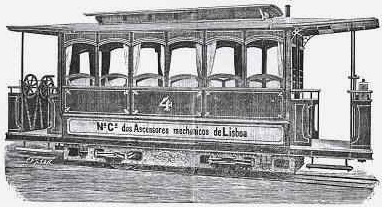
Equipment used on the Graça line

The second line ran from Rua da Palma on a 730 metres (2,400 ft) long route to Largo da Graça, climbing 75 metres (246 ft) in altitude. It was opened on 26 March 1893. The depot and powerhouse were at the Graça terminal. The Graça route was served by bidirectional vehicles. Service ended in 1913 but part of the route was revived in 1915 and continues to operate as an electric tram line (12E).

==== Elevador de São Sebastião ====
On 15 January 1899 a third cable tram line started operating under a different concession from the other two. It was the longest of the lines, extending for 2.7 km (1.7 mi) between São Sebastião and Rossio. The depot and powerhouse were in Palhavá (São Sebastião). It also ran for the shortest time of any of the lines, suffering bankruptcy in 1901.

=== Electrification and modern era ===
Map of Tram tracks in Lisbon (network of 2019 in red)

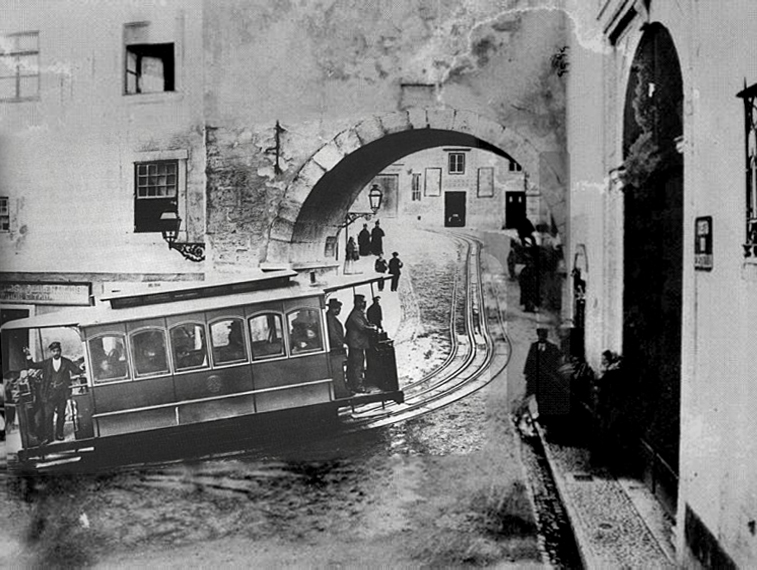
Graça line cable tram running through Arco de Santo André at end of the cable traction era

On 31 August 1901, Lisbon's first electric tramway commenced operations. Within a year, all of the city's americano routes had been converted to electric traction, and by 1913 the cable trams were retired.

Until 1959, the network of lines continued to be developed, and in that year it reached its greatest extent, comprising 27 lines. (Note: Six of the 27 lines operated as circle lines. As the circle lines operated in both clockwise and anticlockwise directions, each with its own route number, it is more correct to speak of a total of 24 tram routes.) The subsequent slow decline of the network began with the expansion of the bus system and the construction of the Lisbon Metro.

All of the lines run on 900 mm (2 ft 11 7/16 in) narrow gauge tram lines.

== Current network ==
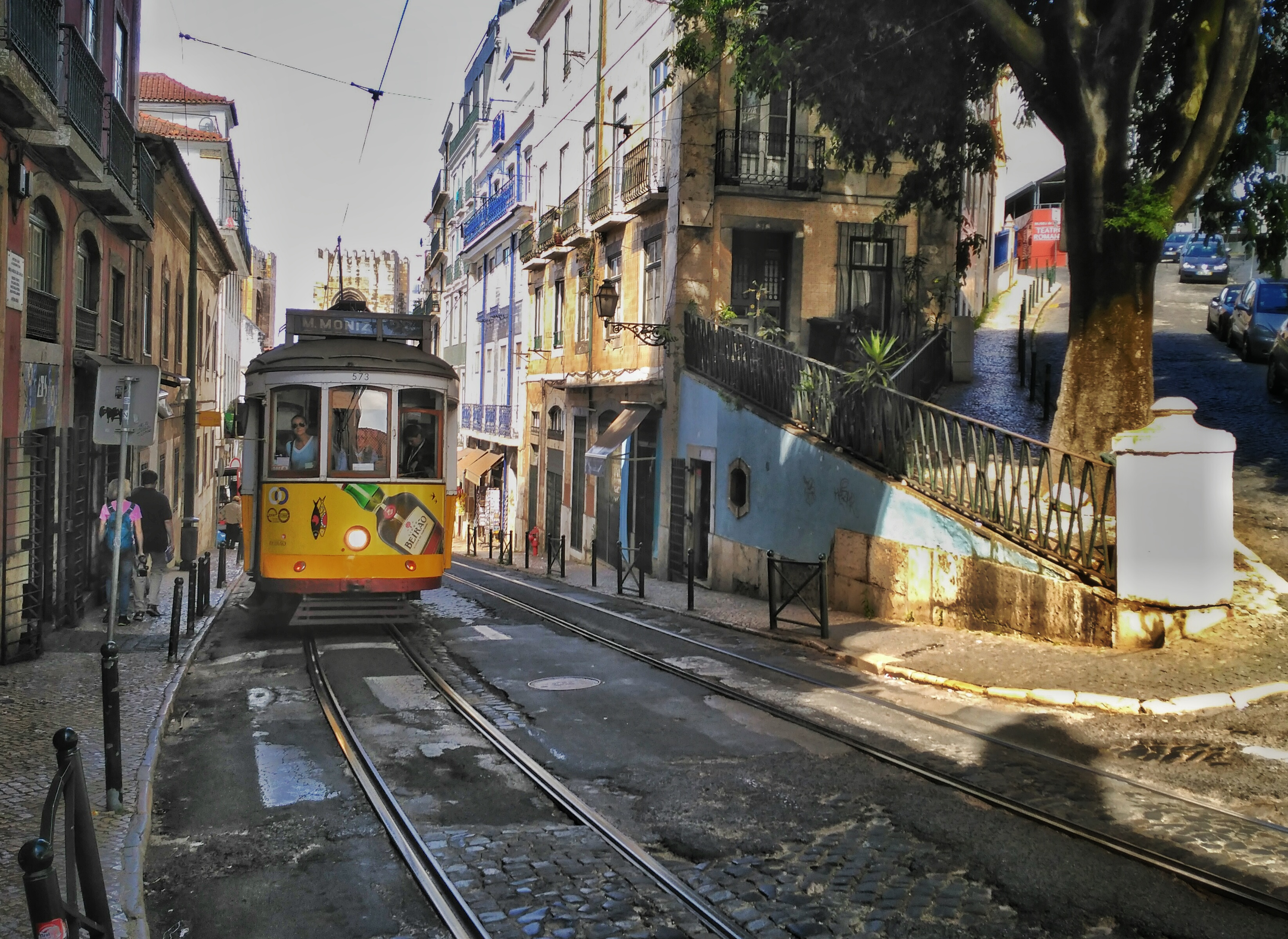
Tram line 28 climbing a hill.

The current lines are:

- 12 - Praça da Figueira → Miradouro de Santa Luzia → Praça da Figueira circular route (clockwise only)
- 15 - Praça da Figueira ↔ Belém ↔ Algés
- 18 - Cais do Sodré railway station ↔ Cemitério da Ajuda
- 24 - Praça Luís de Camões ↔ Campolide
- 25 - Praça da Figueira ↔ Campo de Ourique (Prazeres)
- 28 - Praça Martim Moniz ↔ Graça ↔ Estrela ↔ Campo de Ourique (Prazeres)

The six remaining lines operate in the southern city centre and west of the city only. Aside from the obvious tourist attraction, those lines are still important because sections of the city's topography can only be crossed by small trams. Tram 15 also connects the entire western riverfront of the city to the centre and allows a better link for passengers with the bus system towards an area that still is not served by the metro.

Although reports prepared by both the École Polytechnique Fédérale de Lausanne and the Verkehrsbetriebe Zürich concluded that the network should be retained and even extended, the process of decline continued until 1997, with the closing of the Alto de São João branch and the Arco Cego depot. By that time, many trams were destroyed or sold to other companies. In the following twenty years, there was only one change to the system, the shortening of Line 18 to Cais do Sodré.

== Expansion ==
In an apparent reversal of policy, the mayor (president of the city council) of Lisbon, Fernando Medina, announced in December 2016 that tram 24 would be restored to service in 2017 between Cais do Sodré and Campolide, saying that it was a mistake to reduce the city's network of electric trams and that work would be undertaken to reconstruct it.

Carris originally said this was not a priority, but its 2018 Activity and Budget Plan provides for the purchase in 2020-2021 of:

- 10 more remodelados to augment the current historical fleet and reopen line 24 between Cais do Sodré and Campolide, at a cost of €8 million;
- 20 more articulated trams to extend line 15 eastwards to Santa Apolónia station and the Parque das Nações, at a cost of €50 million.

On 24 April 2018, Line 24 was reopened, albeit initially between Camões and Campolide only. Track connections to the rebuilt loop at Cais do Sodré and some other track issues between Camões and Cais do Sodré will need to be attended to before operation to Cais do Sodré is possible.

In July 2021 agreement was reached for two further extensions:

- a 12.1 km U-shaped surface metro connecting the terminus of the yellow line at Odivelas to the Hospital Beatriz Ângelo in one direction and Loures in the other;
- an additional 24 km of line on route 15, extending it to Linda-a-Velha in the west and to Sacavém in the north-east.

In Spring 2025 Carris announced a timeline for building a new line 16E between Praça do Comércio to Parque Tejo. The line will add 12 km to the city's tram routes and 18 new stops. It will run in a 100-percent dedicated right-of-way. The estimated cost of the extension is €160 million. Completion of phase 1 of line 16E, between Praça do Comércio and Santa Apolónia Station, is expected in 2029, and to Parque Tejo in 2031.

== Rolling stock ==
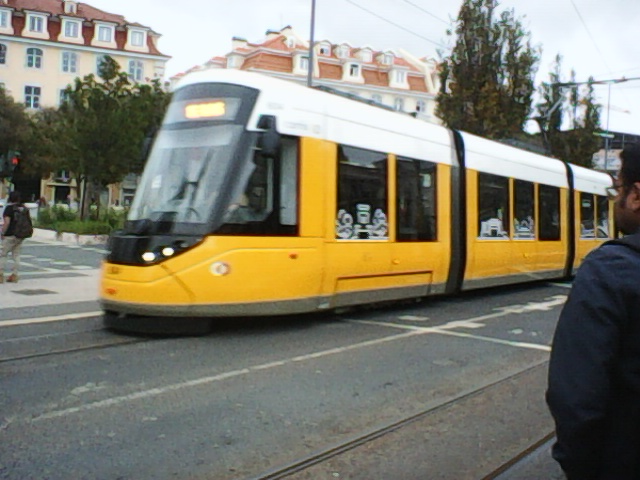
One of the 15 articulated CAF Urbos cars.

The tram fleet has fallen in size from 57 in 2012 to 48 in 2016. Vehicles used are:

- 'Articulado' trams made by Siemens (Siemens/CAF nos 501-506 and Siemens/Sorefame nos 507–510). These articulated vehicles were introduced in 1995 and run only on route 15.
- Carris ordered 15 new CAF Urbos trams in 2021. It is expected that the delivery of the vehicles to Carris – starting in April 2023 – will be completed during 2024.
- 'Remodelado' trams (nos 541–585) used on all routes.
- Tourist trams used on some routes.

== See also ==
- Ascensor da Bica
- Ascensor da Glória
- Ascensor do Lavra
- Carris
- List of town tramway systems in Portugal
