= Sunbeam Commercial Vehicles =

Former British business

1934 Sunbeam Commercial Vehicles 1946 Sunbeam Trolleybus Company 1979 Pressed Steel Fisher 00294186
- Company type: Private Limited Company
- Industry: Automotive industry
- Predecessor: division of Sunbeam Motor Car Company
- Founded: 17 November 1934
- Fate: dissolved 19 March 1996
- Headquarters: Wolverhampton, England
- Key people: Sydney Guy
- Products: Buses, light commercial vehicles and (electric) trolleybuses and milk floats
- Parent: 1934—S T D Motors; 1935—Rootes Group; 1946—John Brockhouse & Co; 1948—Guy Motors; 1961 —Jaguar Cars; 1966 —British Motor Holdings; 1968 —British Leyland

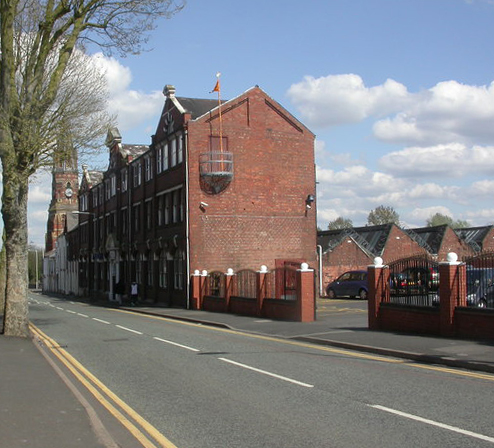
Portion of Moorfield Works 2009 Offices, showroom and workshops for Sunbeam Motor Car Company Upper Villiers St, Wolverhampton.

Sunbeam Commercial Vehicles was a commercial vehicle manufacturing offshoot of the Wolverhampton based Sunbeam Motor Car Company when it was a subsidiary of S T D Motors Limited. Sunbeam had always made ambulances on modified Sunbeam car chassis. S T D Motors chose to enter the large commercial vehicle market in the late 1920s, and once established they made petrol and diesel buses and electrically powered trolleybuses and milk floats. Commercial Vehicles became a separate department of Sunbeam in 1931.

Ownership switched from S T D Motors to Rootes Securities in mid-1935, and later that year their Karrier trolleybus designs were added to Sunbeam production lines. In 1946 J. Brockhouse and Co of West Bromwich bought Sunbeam but in September 1948 sold the trolleybus part of the business to Guy Motors. In the early 1950s the amalgamated Sunbeam, Karrier and Guy trolleybus operation was the largest in Britain and possibly the world. In 1954 Sunbeam Commercial Vehicles moved within Wolverhampton from the Moorfield Works in Blakenhall to new extensions at Guy Motors Fallings Park.

Guy Motors was bought by Jaguar Cars in 1961 and was closed by Jaguar's parent company, British Leyland, in 1982.

== Owners ==
=== Sunbeam Motor Car Company ===
The Sunbeam Cycles brand appeared in 1887 when John Marston made his first bicycles and branded them Sunbeam. He added cars to his products and in 1905 formed the Sunbeam Motor Car Company after building, a mile or so south of his cycle works, his new Moorfield Works for his car workshops in Upper Villiers Street, Blakenhall, Wolverhampton. He had established Villiers Engineering there some years earlier.

At its height in the 1920s, Sunbeam Motor Car Company's Moorfield works employed 3,500 staff on their 50-acre (20 ha) site. The buildings covered a full 15 acres (6.1 ha). Sunbeam made a 3-axle bus chassis in December 1928 in an attempt to diversify. Known as the Sunbeam Sikh it had a Sunbeam 6-cylinder 7.98-litre engine developing 142 brake horse power in a chassis designed for a double-deck body carrying 60 to 70 passengers. A smaller 2-axle model Pathan appeared in August 1929 fitted with a 6.6-litre engine developing 110 bhp capable of carrying a 26-seater single deck or luxury coach body. Sales were disappointing despite Sunbeam's good build quality. Sydney S Guy had been Sunbeam Works Manager until May 1914 when he left to start his own business. His Guy Motors had produced the world's first 3-axle trolleybuses in 1926, and Wolverhampton Corporation had bought a number of them. In 1931 Sunbeam decided to follow suit and split off a commercial vehicles division. They took their 3-axle motor bus chassis and modified it to carry the electric motors and control gear of a trolleybus. The design was a success, and large numbers were sold. By the summer of 1933 Sunbeam trolleybuses were running on the Wolverhampton, Walsall and other British networks.

=== Rootes ===
In mid 1934 near the height of the Great Depression it became known that the Sunbeam Motor Car Company was unable to repay large sums borrowed for Sunbeam by parent company S T D Motors ten years earlier. In October 1934 a committee of the unhappy lenders asked the court to appoint a Receiver and Manager and though it was briefly avoided and a new company named Sunbeam Commercial Vehicles was hastily incorporated on 17 November 1934 it proved impossible to avoid the receivership. The receivership held up the sale of the business. Rootes Securities Limited announced in early July 1935 that sanctioned by an Order of the Court a subsidiary, Motor Industries, had entered into possession of the share capital of Sunbeam Commercial Vehicles Limited along with the other undertaking, assets and goodwill of Sunbeam Motor Car Company. Motor Industries would change its name to include Sunbeam and would continue the manufacture of Sunbeam's cars and trolley buses. Rootes soon transferred manufacture of their recently acquired Karrier trolleybuses to Moorfield.

AEC tried a joint venture with Sunbeam in 1935 and made a bus built on an AEC chassis with a Gardner engine and Sunbeam bodywork. It was not successful and sales were poor. Sunbeam also produced milk floats and other battery electric road vehicles in the late 1930s. AEC withdrew from the venture in 1944 and was bought by Leyland Motors in 1946.

=== Guy Motors ===
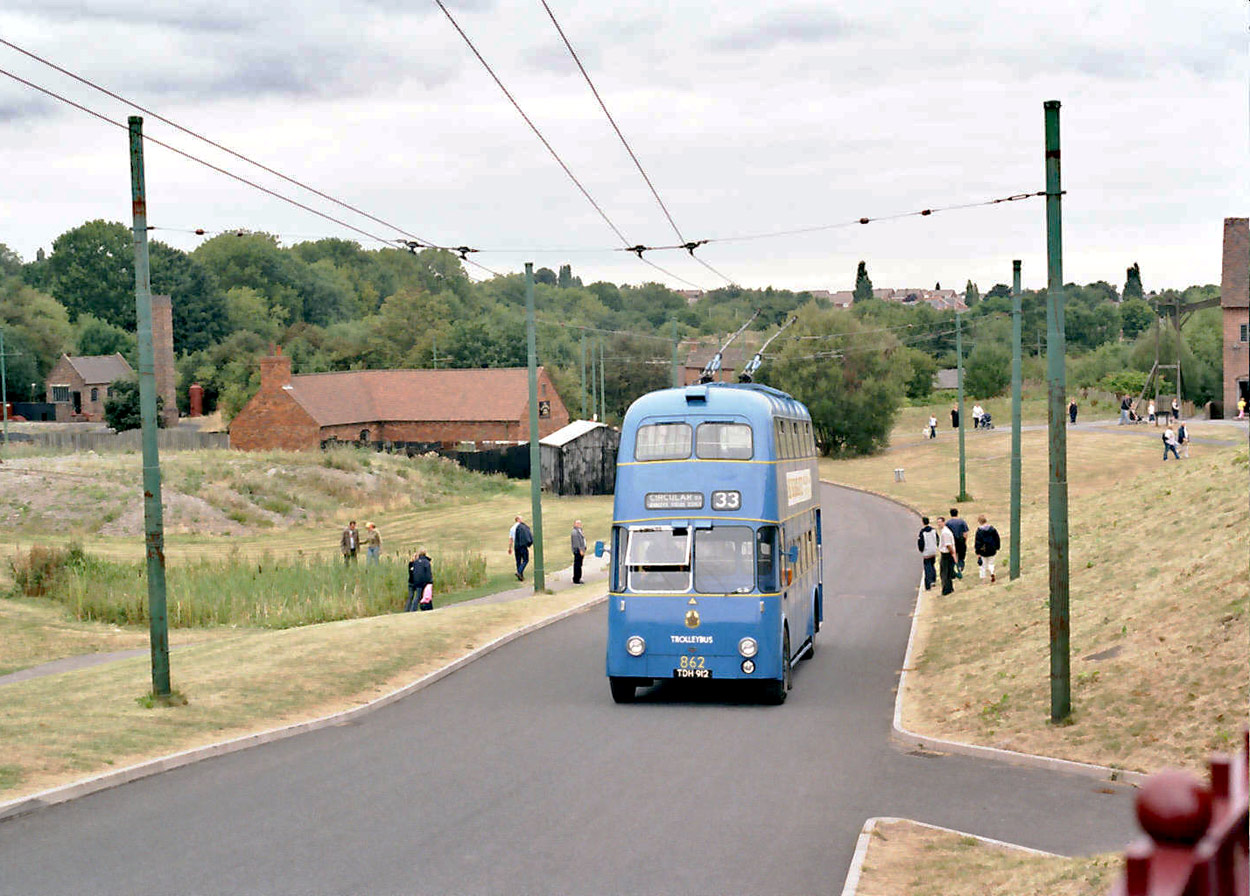
Former Walsall trolleybus No 862 at the Black Country Living Museum. It is a Sunbeam F4A model, with British Thompson Houston electrical equipment and bodywork by Willowbrook, built in 1955.

Sunbeam Commercial Vehicles was sold to the Brockhouse Group in August 1946. In September 1948 the Sunbeam Trolley Bus Company was sold on to Guy Motors but Brockhouse kept Sunbeam's machine-tool section. Guy adopted the Sunbeam marque for most of their subsequent trolleybus sales. The bringing together of Sunbeam Karrier and Guy trolleybus factories created Britain's largest trolleybus manufacturer. At the beginning of 1949 contracts were in hand to provide trolleybuses for the systems at Newcastle, Teesside, Wolverhampton, Maidstone, South Shields, Glasgow, Reading, and Ipswich in Britain, Durban, Johannesburg, and Pretoria in South Africa, Coimbra in Portugal, and Adelaide, Brisbane and Perth in Australia.

Production moved from Moorfield to new-built extensions at the Guy works during 1954. The first Sunbeam trolleybuses to be built at Guy's Fallings Park site were a batch for Penang, followed by a batch for Hull but by the end of 1956 it was clear that local and international demand for trolleybuses was declining.

Guy Motors faced severe difficulties in the late 1950s exacerbated by an ill-advised decision to manage South African retail sales in-house and the failure of the Wulfrunian, a front-entrance, front-engined motor bus developed for the West Riding Automobile Company. Guy Motors last ordinary dividend had been paid in 1957.

=== Jaguar ===
Lloyds Bank appointed a receiver in September 1961. The next month Jaguar Cars bought Guy Motors from the receiver hoping it might be feasible to coordinate and rationalise output with their recently acquired Daimler Company's buses. Jaguar bought only the assets and business of Guy Motors Limited and Guy Motors Limited was wound up.

London's trolleybuses were phased out in 1962 after a reign of 30 years. At the end of the 1930s they had run 1,700 trolleybuses over about one-fifth of their total bus routes. The same year saw the last deliveries in the United Kingdom, to Bournemouth.

Further takeovers followed. In September 1966, Jaguar was bought by the British Motor Corporation (BMC), which became British Motor Holdings (BMH) in December 1966. By 1967 BMH Jaguar's Sunbeam, Britain's only manufacturer of trolleybuses, offered three models: a 2-axle design for single deck vehicles, another for double-deck vehicles and a 3-axle double-deck chassis. Each chassis was available with a number of different wheelbases to enable vehicles of different lengths to be built: the single deck vehicles with four variants, the 2-axle double-deck chassis with three, and the 3-axle chassis with two but there were no further sales. The last delivery was to Portugal in 1966.

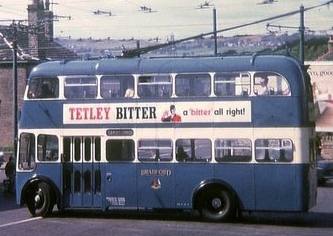
A trolleybus in Bradford in 1970. The Bradford Trolleybus system was the last one to operate in the United Kingdom; closing in 1972

=== British Leyland ===
Sunbeam Trolley Bus, Guy Motors and Daimler Transport Vehicles went into the truck and bus division of British Leyland when BMH was taken into British Leyland

Britain's last electric trolleybuses were run by Bradford. The decision to replace them with diesel buses was announced in March 1972. The next year thirty-one nations adopted "plans to save Europe's Heritage by removing overhead trolleybus cables, electricity and telephone wires and big unsympathetic shop windows."

The dormant Sunbeam Trolleybus Company legal entity was renamed Pressed Steel Fisher in 1978 and given by Michael Edwardes British Leyland's freshly separated car body business. British Leyland's truck division closed in 1982.

== Products ==
=== Trolleybuses ===
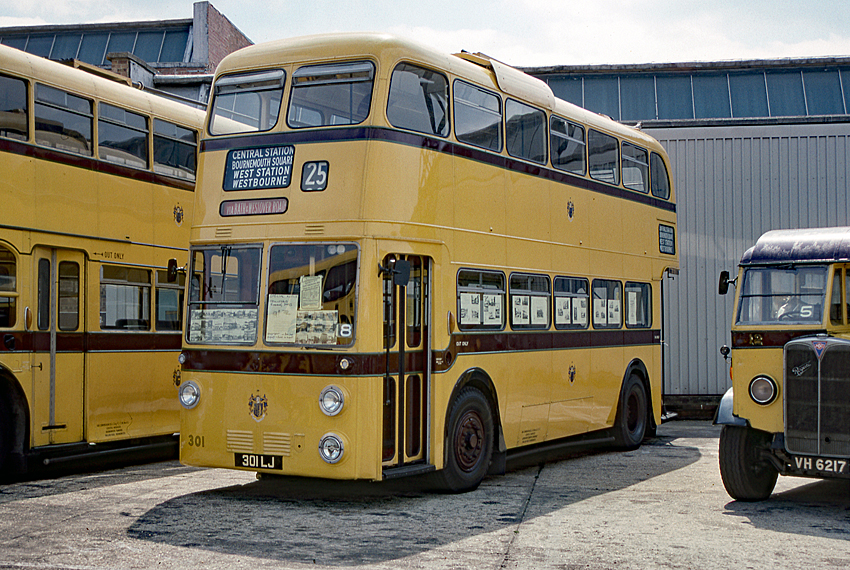
Bournemouth Sunbeam MF2B trolleybus 301 at Mallard Road depot

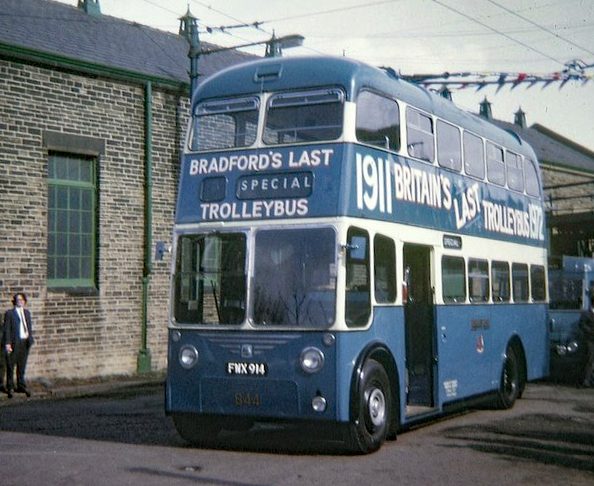
Bradford Sunbeam F4

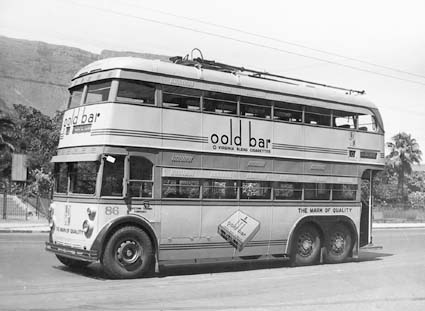
Cape Town Tramways Sunbeam

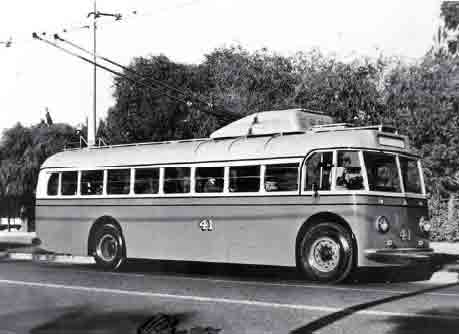
Perth Sunbeam F4

The first trolleybus built by Sunbeam entered service on the Wolverhampton system in 1931. It was a model MS2 with bodywork by Weymann, and carried the fleet number 95. It had three axles and could carry 61 passengers. The 1930s saw a fairly rapid expansion in the number of trolleybuses which were operating in Britain. There were 400 such vehicles on the roads in early 1931, but the following years saw many tramway systems replaced by trolleybuses. Bournemouth Corporation Tramways began that process in 1933, when they placed an order for 103 double-deck vehicles with Sunbeam, which were fitted with electrical equipment manufactured by British Thompson Houston (BTH) of Rugby.

Sunbeam exported their trolleybuses to a number of countries. In South Africa, Cape Town Tramways operated a fleet, where all of the 3-axle buses were bought from Sunbeam. An initial order for 60 was placed in November 1937, and the vehicles were fitted with BTH electrical equipment while the regenerative rheostatic braking system was produced by Ransomes. Bodywork was of all metal construction, and was made by Metro Cammell Weymann. 11 more vehicles were ordered in 1939. The Cape Town network ran into the foothills of Table Mountain, requiring them to negotiate long gradients, but they performed well. One of the worst routes in this respect rose 352 feet (107 m) in 1 mile (1.6 km), with a maximum gradient of 1 in 8 (12.5 per cent).

Following trials with two Swiss-built trolleybuses, Coimbra in Portugal ordered six Sunbeams in 1950, with a view to replacing the tram system if they proved successful. The vehicles supplied were based on Sunbeam's MF2B model, with two axles and a wheelbase of 16.25 feet (4.95 m). They were fitted with single deck bodywork by Park Royal Vehicles, with 40 seats and room for 35 standing passengers. In order to enable them to be operated by just the driver, they included an overhang of 8.25 feet (2.51 m) beyond the front axle, allowing the entrance door to be mounted just behind the windscreen, so that payment could be made to the driver when entering the vehicle. To cope with the steep gradients of the Coimbra system, they were fitted with 125 horsepower (93 kW) 600-volt motors, and each trolleybus carried two compressors, normally designed to work together, but each capable of maintaining the air supply for braking and door operation if one should fail.

The expanding trolleybus network in Perth, Western Australia, placed an order for 50 F4 vehicles in 1950/51. These were shipped to Australia as chassis, with bodywork provided on arrival. Ten of the trolleybuses carried bodies by Commonwealth Engineering of Sydney, while the remaining 40 were bodied more locally, by the bus manufacturer Boltons of West Perth. Boltons and Commonwealth Engineering formed a close working relationship during this period, with Boltons effectively working as a sub-contractor. All of the vehicles had 2-axles, with an entrance in the centre of the vehicle.

A variety of configurations was available and Hull Corporation trialled a Roe bodied Sunbeam in February 1953, which had a separate entrance and exit, and twin staircases. This reduced the seating capacity to 54, but the design, which was specified by the Transport Manager Mr G H Pulfrey, was well-received, and an order for a further 15 such vehicles was placed in April 1953. Electrical equipment was by Metropolitan-Vickers.

Many early British trolleybuses were of 3-axle design, partly because of legislation which restricted the length of 2-axle designs and partly because of the difficulty of designing a back axle which could cope with the torque supplied by an electric motor. It took until 1954 for official attitudes to change, when Walsall gained permission to run 30-foot (9.1 m) long 2-axle trolleybuses, and it was the Sunbeam Trolleybus Company, by then owned by Guy, which built them. They were officially model F4A, and 15 of them were ordered. Bodywork was built by Willowbrook, later acquired by Duple Coachbuilders, and the vehicles could seat 70 passengers. They were of a lightweight design, weighing just 7.25 tons, and No. 851, the first to enter service, did so before the legislation had been changed to allow a bus of this length with only two axles. It therefore required special dispensation from the Ministry of Transport.

Sunbeam manufactured a total of 1,152 trolleybusses for the United Kingdom market, with the last delivered in 1962 to Bournemouth. The last Sunbeam trolleybuses were built for use in Portugal in 1966.

=== Milk floats ===
Sunbeam Commercial Vehicles showcased two battery electric road vehicles at the Commercial Vehicle Show in November 1937. They were both 12–15 cwt models, with a British Thompson-Houston (BTH) motor, which was controlled by magnetic contactors, similar to those used on Sunbeam-BTH trolleybuses. One was fitted with an open deck milk float body, suitable for dairy work, while the other had a van body, manufactured by Glover, Webb & Liversidge, and was one of a batch of vehicles supplied to Selfridges, the London department store. The motor was mounted in the middle of the vehicle, and drove the rear axle through a Hardy-Spicer propeller shaft and double reduction gearing. The chassis carried three batteries, one on either side between the wheels, and one at the rear. When the vehicle was tested by Commercial Motor in 1940, it was available with five sizes of battery, rated at 128, 160, 192, 224 or 240 amp-hours, the larger sizes giving a longer range between charges.

Control of the 12–15 cwt model was by a bar-type accelerator pedal, which controlled the operation of several electro-magnetic contactors. Series resistances were used to limit the current on the first two stages of the controller. The front hubs were mounted on taper roller bearings, while the back axle included double-reduction gearing and a removable differential, to assist maintenance. The transmission between the motor and the rear axle was by a shaft fitted with two Hardy Spicer universal joints. The brakes were manufactured by the Bendix Corporation, and both the foot and hand brakes operated on all four wheels. Although all models seemed to be classified as 12–15 cwt, the standard design had a load platform which was 8 feet (2.4 m) long, while short chassis and long chassis variants were also produced, with platforms of 7.25 feet (2.21 m) and 9 feet (2.7 m).

Manufacture of battery-electric road vehicles seems to have ceased at around the time that the Sunbeam Trolleybus Company was sold to Guy Motors, for the goodwill of the Sunbeam battery-electric operation was bought by Hindle Smart of Manchester, makers of Helecs milk floats, in early 1949. An advert in Commercial Motor magazine from 1 July 1949 mentions that there was a Jen-Helecs drivers club, for drivers of Jen-Helecs, Sunbeam and Wilson Electric vehicles. Membership entitled the user to a free badge.

== Bibliography ==
- Dunn, John (2006). Comeng: A history of Commonwealth Engineering: Volume 1: 1921–1955. Dural: Rosenberg Publishing. ISBN 978-1-877058-42-4.
- Hills, S M (1943). Battery Electric Vehicles. George Newnes.
- Joyce, J; King, J S; Newman, A G (1986). British Trolleybus Systems. Ian Allan. ISBN 978-0-7110-1647-7.
- Klapper, Charles (1974). The Golden Age of Tramways. David & Charles. ISBN 978-0-7153-6458-1.
