= Trams in Portugal =

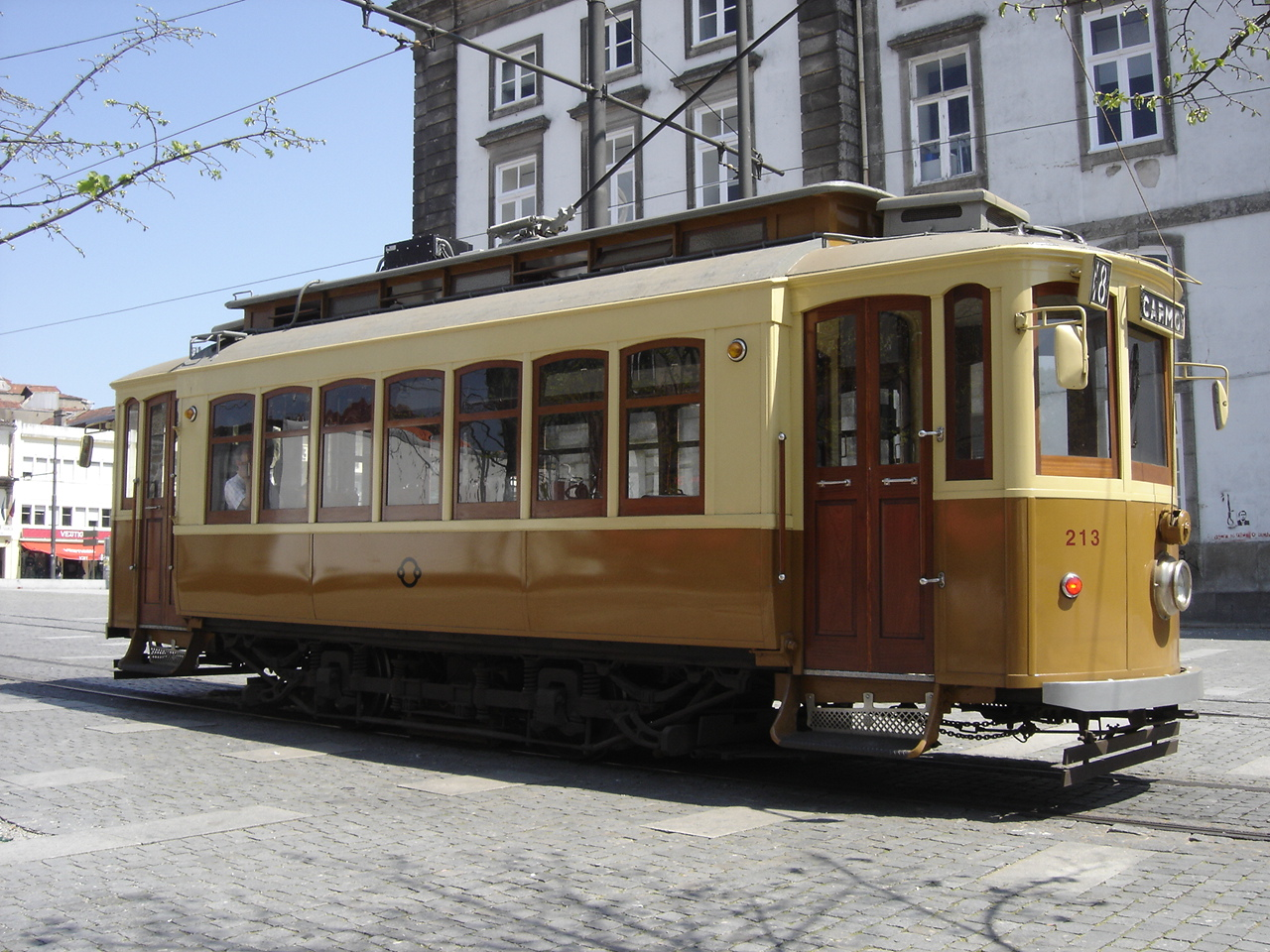
Porto tram - line 18

Trams in Portugal have generally been traditional electric cars in large cities such as Lisbon, Porto and Sintra. Portuguese tram routes are typically, but not necessarily, tourist attractions.

Tramways are usually embedded in the older parts of Portuguese cities. They are intended primarily for carrying passengers, and as a means of rapid transportation, since the trams usually have priority over the remaining traffic.

Trams came to Portugal in the following sequence: Porto (1895), Lisbon (1901), Sintra (1904), Coimbra (1911) and Braga (1914). The first three of these networks are still in operation; the remaining two have been closed.

== Lisbon ==
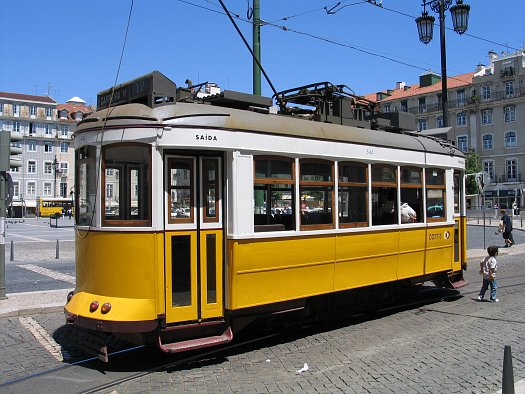
Lisbon tram.

The "amarelos da Carris" (English:Yellows of the Rails) are a symbol of Lisbon, plying the narrow streets, steep and winding.

The Lisbon tramway network is operated by Carris. It presently comprises 5 lines, and has a total length of 48 km (30 mi) in 900 mm (2 ft 11 7/16 in) gauge, of which 13 km (8.1 mi) is on reserved tracks.

Carris employs 165 brakemen (conductors of trams), funiculars and an elevator (the Santa Justa lift) and a runs a fleet of 57 tram vehicles (39 historical, 10 articulated trams and 8 light rail cars), based at a single depot - Santo Amaro.

== Porto ==
A tram at the Mandim stop of the Metro do Porto in 2012

The tramway network in the city of Porto is operated by Sociedade de Transportes Colectivos do Porto (STCP).

There are three different Porto tram routes:

- Line 1: Passeio Alegre//Infante
- Line 18: Massarelos// Carmo
- Line 22: Circular Carmo//Batalha

The STCP tram fleet is housed at the Massarelos depot next to the STCP Tram Museum.

== Sintra ==
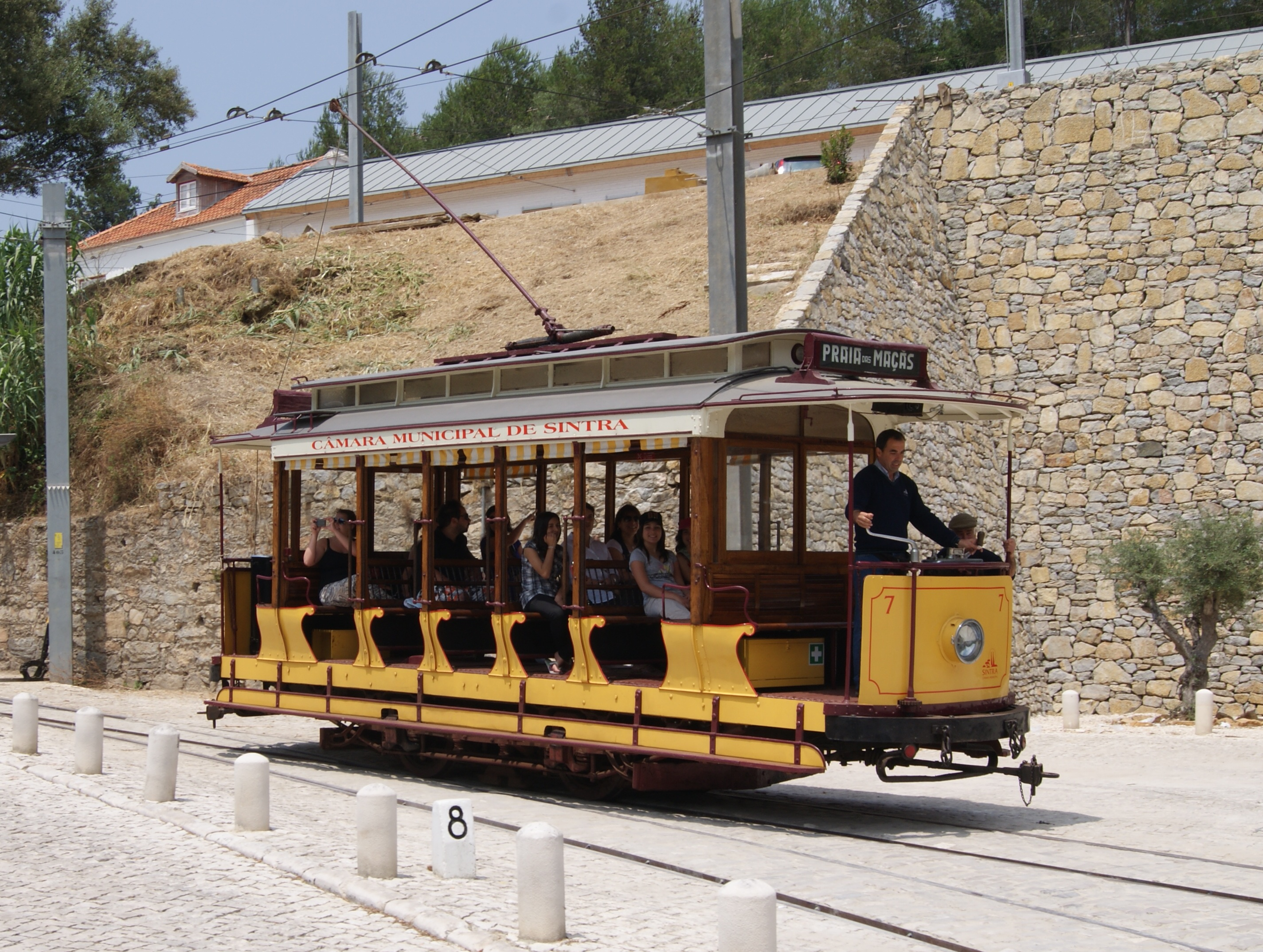
Sintra open tram 7

The Sintra tramway is a seasonal narrow gauge interurban tram line. It links the town of Sintra, some 30 kilometres (19 mi) north-west of Lisbon, with the Atlantic coast at Praia das Maçãs, a distance of some 11.5 kilometres (7.1 mi). As of 2014, the line runs Friday to Sunday in summer months.

The line opened in 1904 and originally linked Sintra railway station and Praia das Maçãs. Winter service ended in 1953, and the line continued to run as a summer only service until 1974, when it closed. Service resumed over a short stretch near the coast in 1980, and service has been extended back to Sintra in several sections over the intervening years.

== Coimbra ==
Coimbra saw its first tram circulating in the streets on 10 November 1911. For decades, with more or fewer lines, the tram was an efficient way to move citizens around Coimbra.

Although in this period there was not environmental awareness in its present form, trams were a means of non-polluting transport that allowed Coimbra have an air quality unmatched today.

Nevertheless, in the late 1970s the trams were considered to be old fashioned, noisy and uncomfortable. Politicians and others were then promoting their rapid decline with the closing of the different lines. The last tram ran in Coimbra on 9 January 1980.

== Braga ==
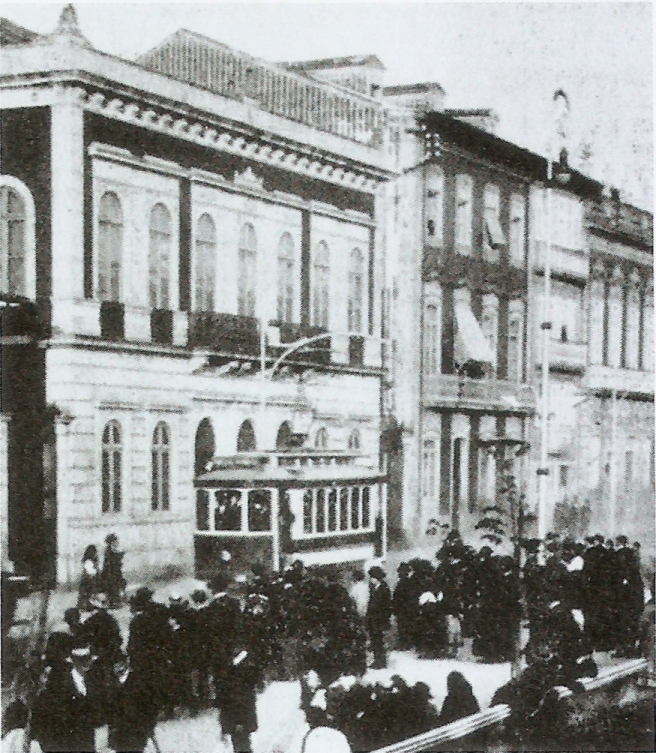
First day of service in 1914

The Braga tramway network opened on 5 October 1914, replacing the old Braga horsecar network. It consisted of two routes:

- Line 1: Estação caminho de ferro (English: Railway station) to Elevador do Bom Jesus;
- Line 2: Largo do Monte de Arcos to Parque da Ponte.

The network was finally closed in 1963, and replaced by the Braga trolleybus system. The tracks remained in place until the 1980s.

== Gallery ==

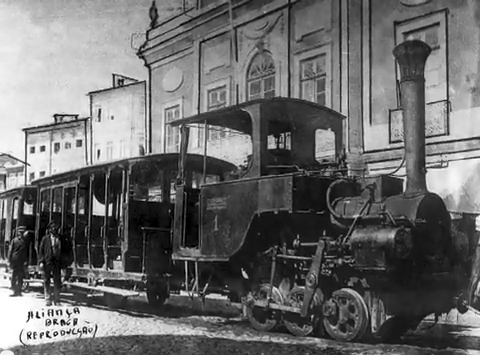

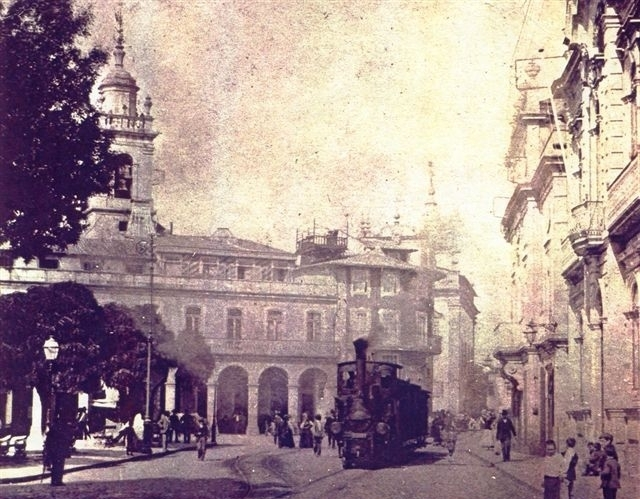

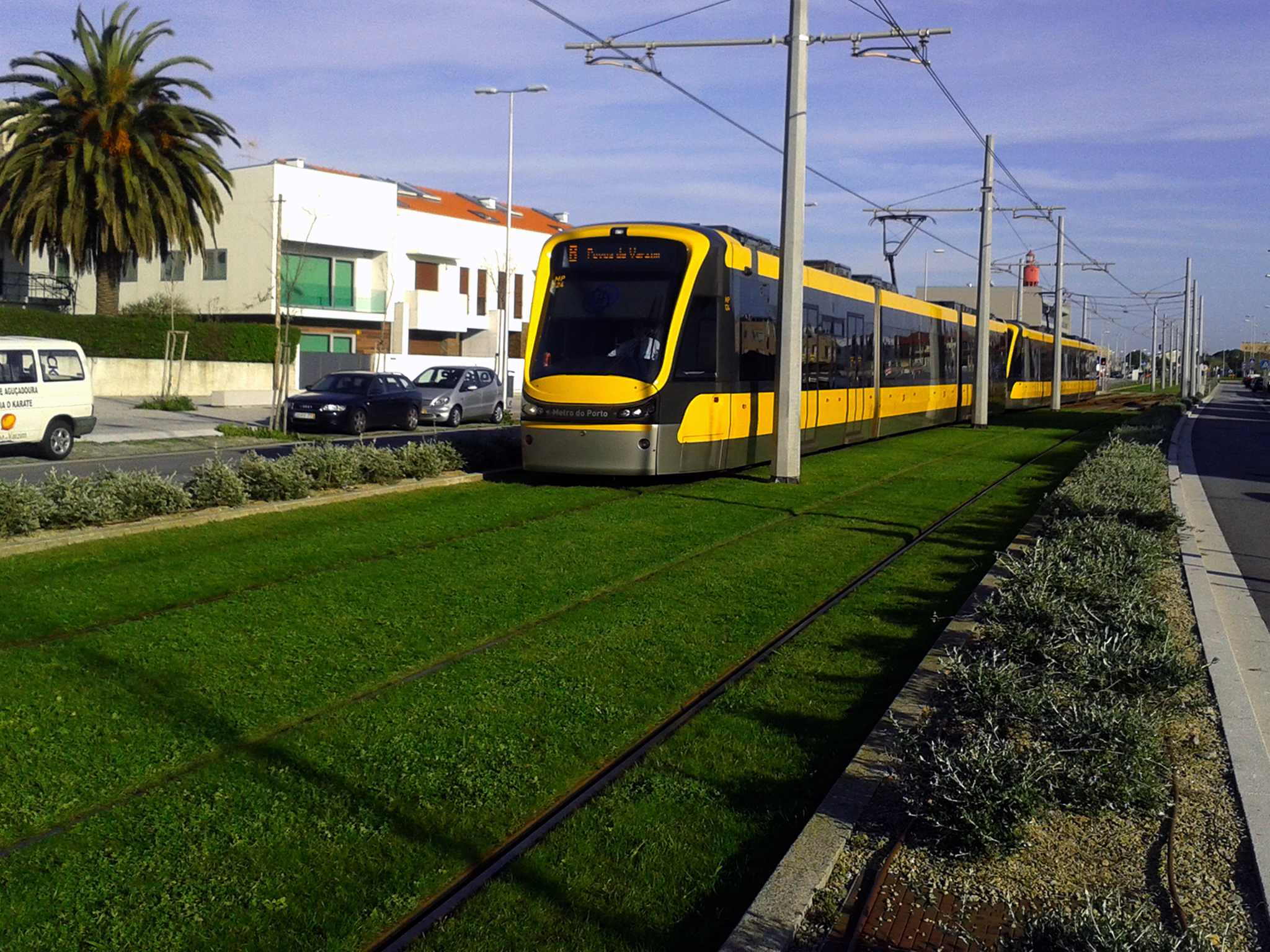

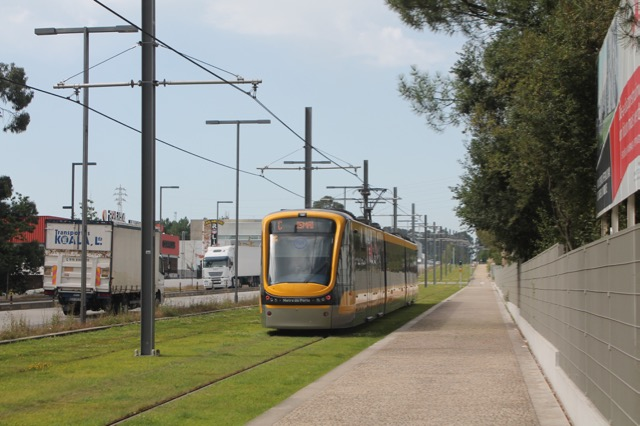

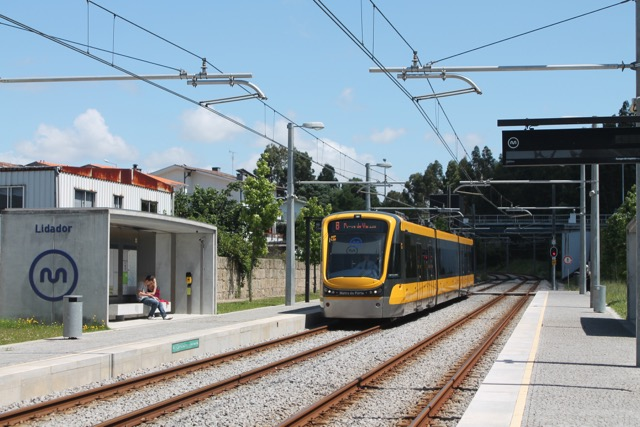

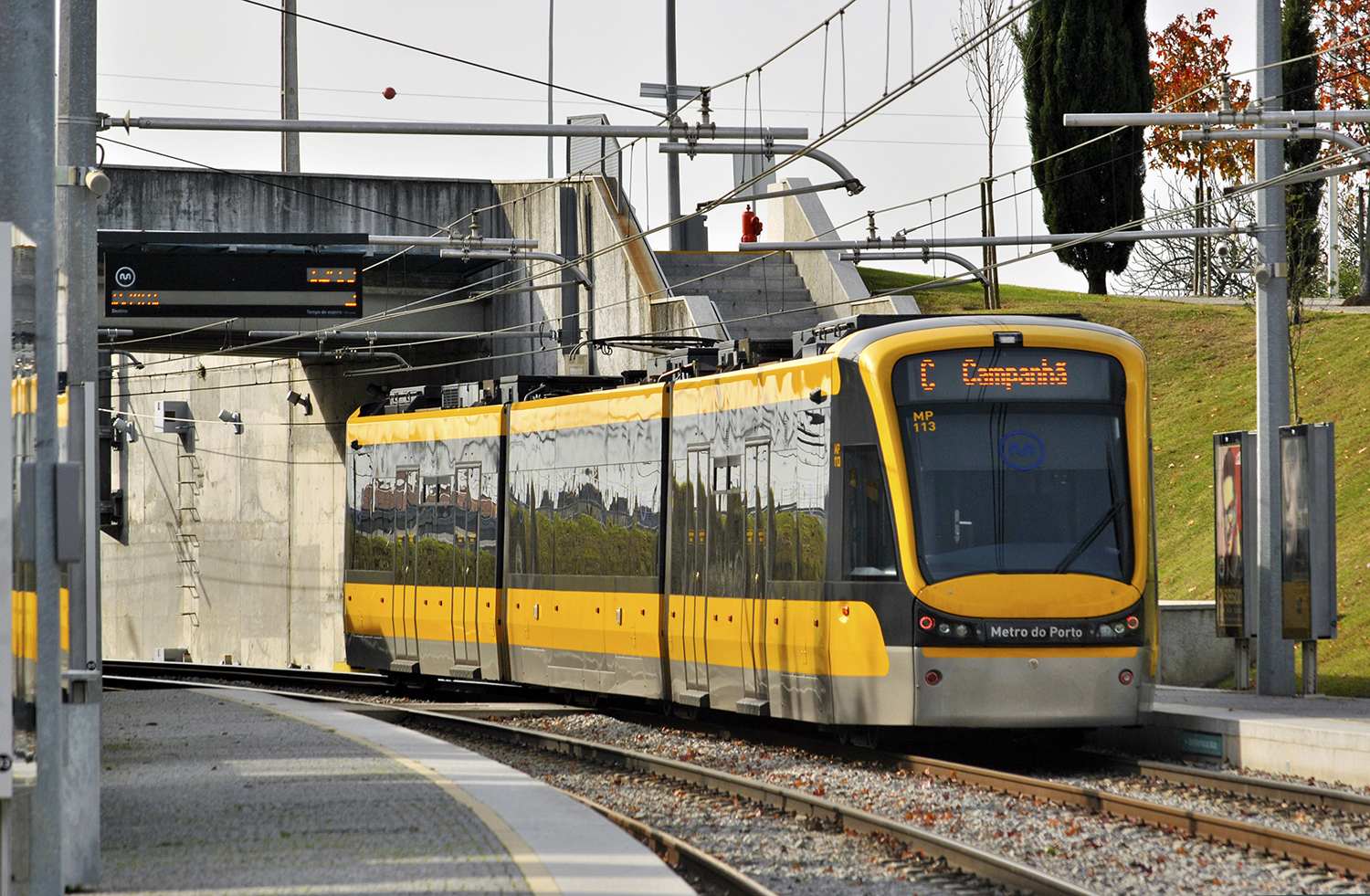

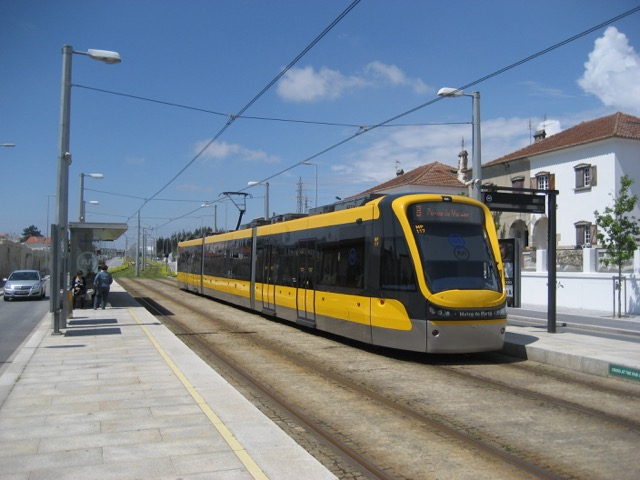

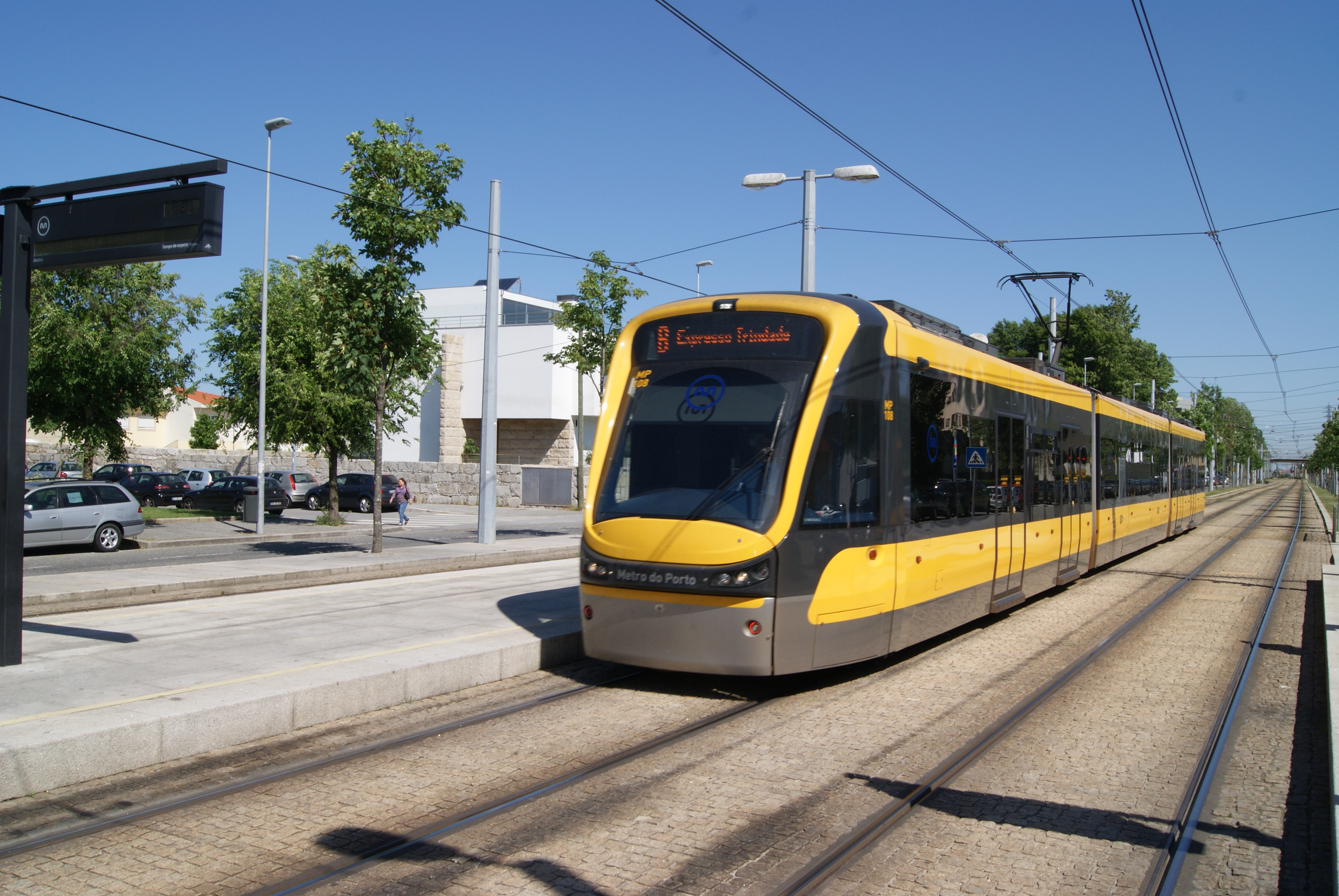

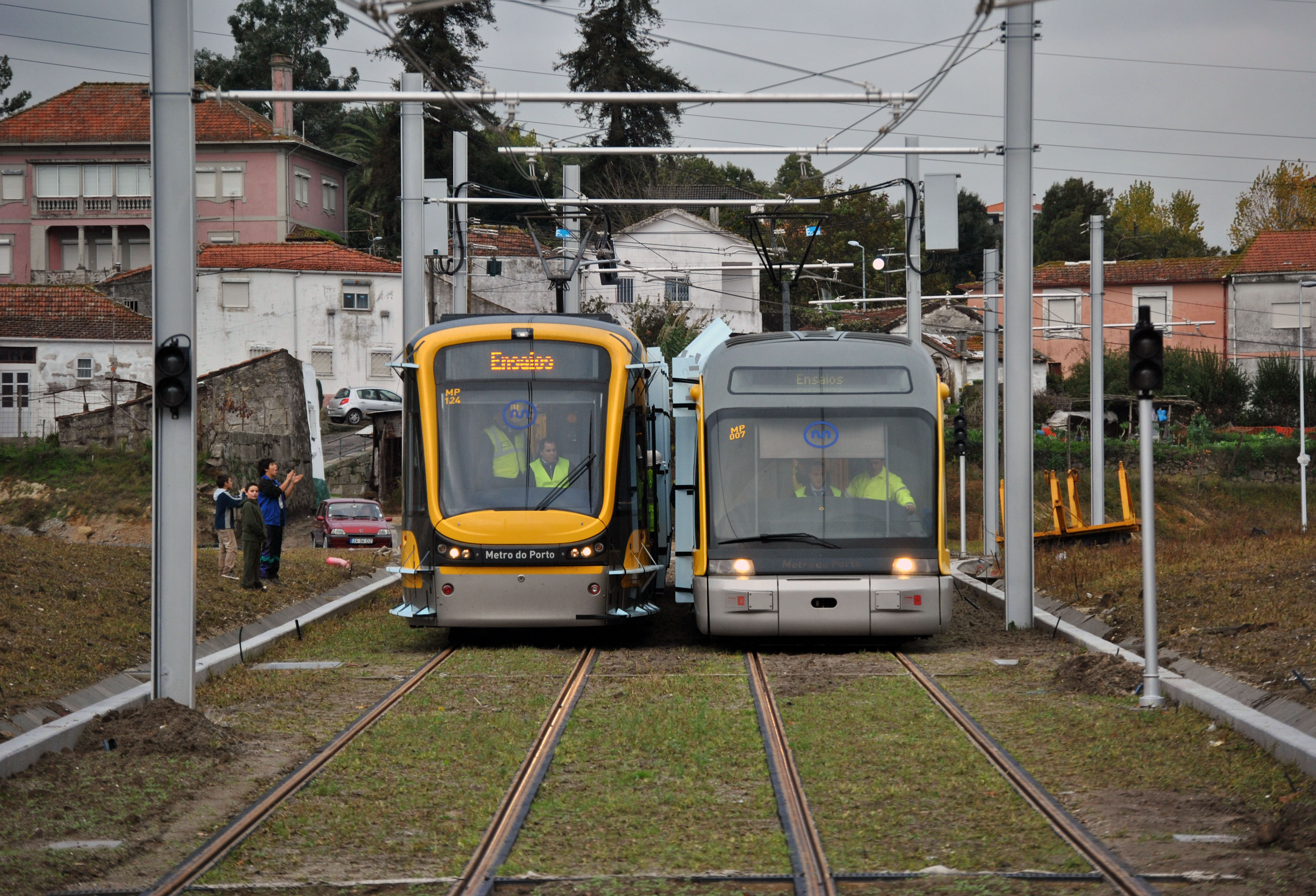

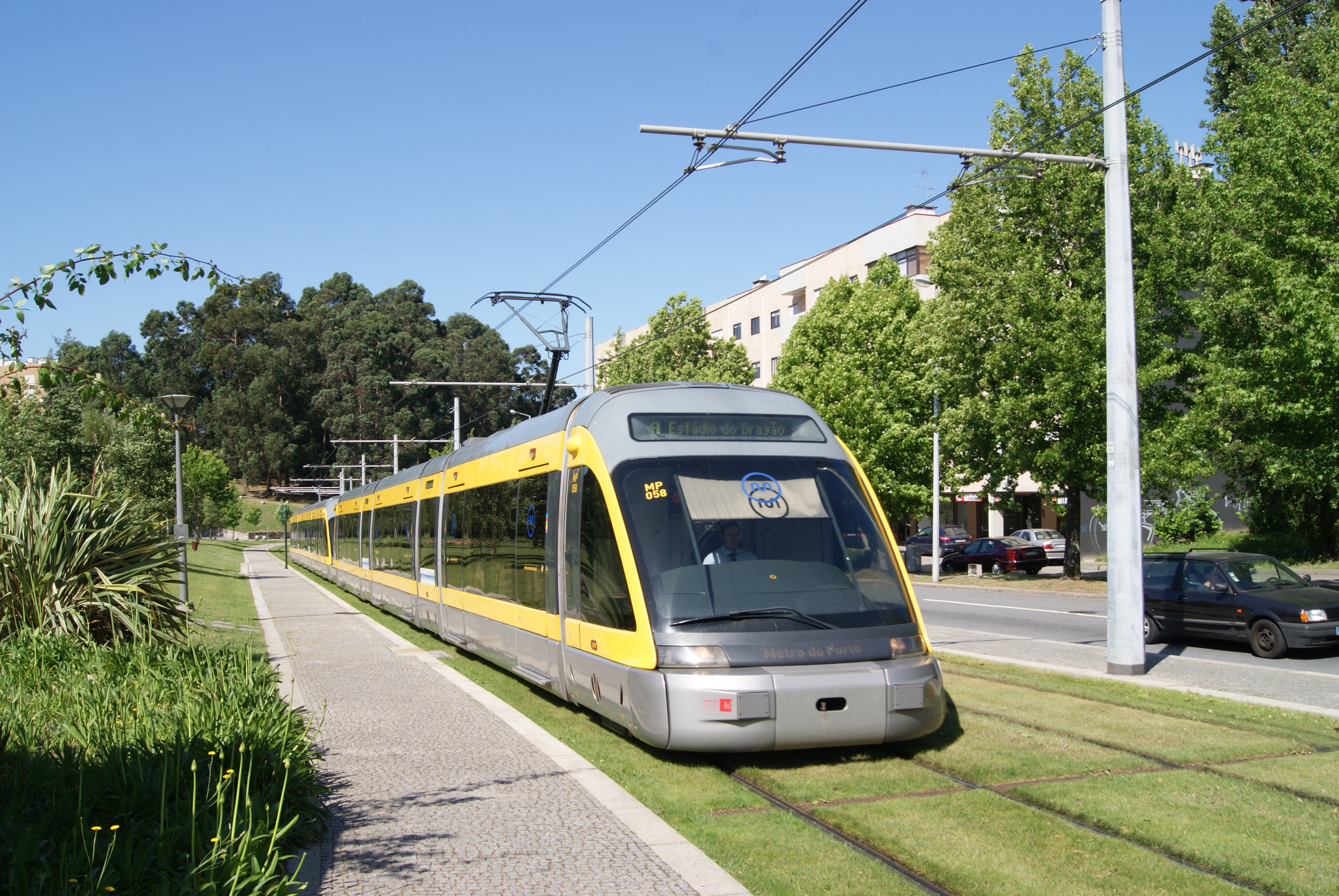

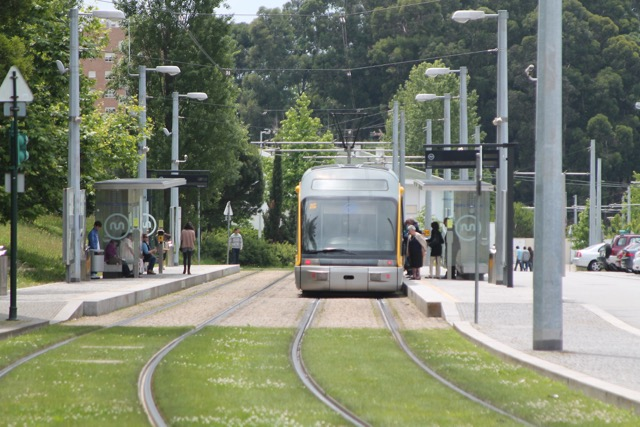

=== Tram interiors ===

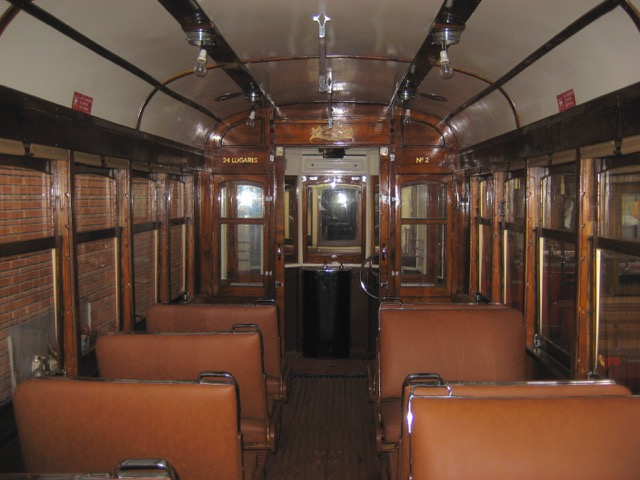

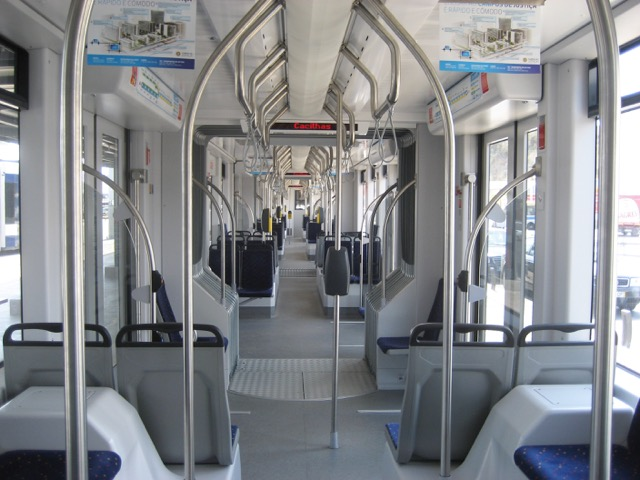

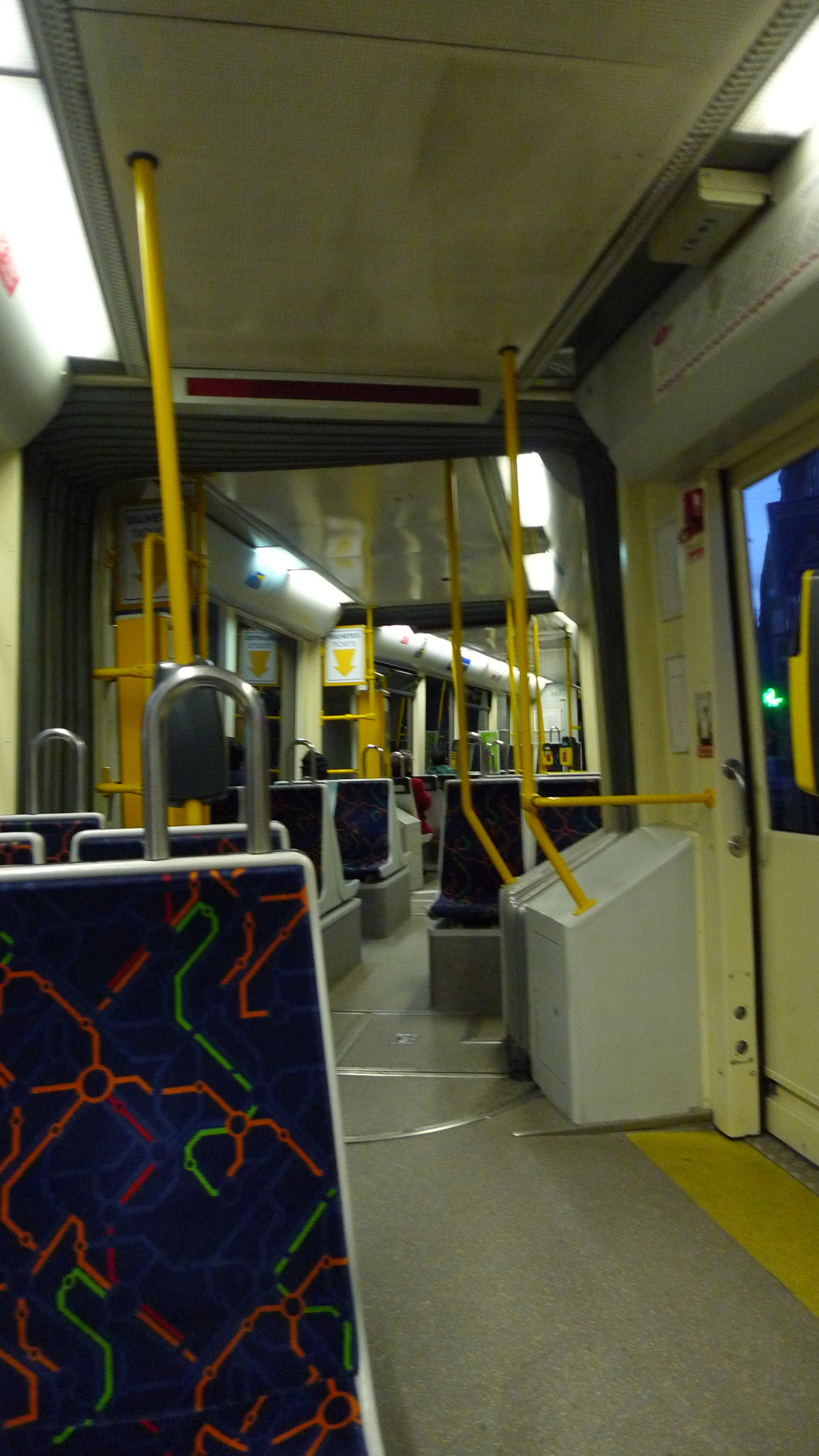

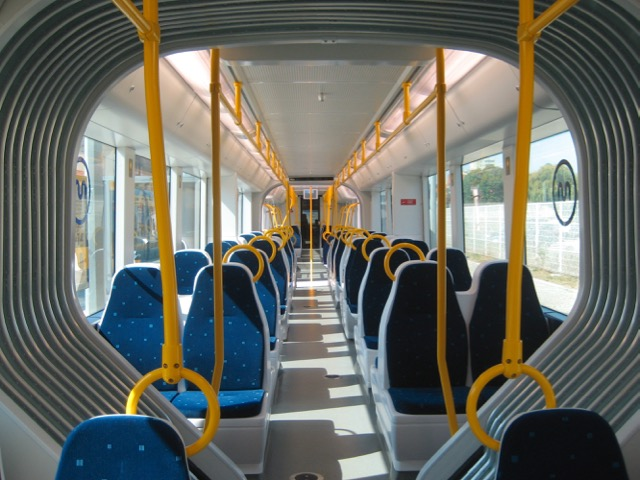

== See also ==
- List of town tramway systems in Portugal
- History of rail transport in Portugal
- List of town tramway systems in Europe
- Rail transport in Portugal
