= Boltons (bus manufacturer) =

Australian bus manufacturer

- Industry: Bus manufacturing
- Founded: 1888
- Founder: Isaac Bolton
- Defunct: 1972
- Headquarters: West Perth

Boltons was an Australian bus bodybuilder in West Perth.

== History ==
In 1888, Isaac Bolton founded a coach building business as Bolton & Sons in Fremantle. Isaac retired in 1912, with sons Alfred and Leonard taking over the business.

In 1926, the business of Daniel White & Co was purchased. In June 1936, a new factory on land purchased from Holden in West Perth was opened by the Minister for Industry, Albert Hawke. In 1948, the company passed to Leonard's two sons.

In the early 1950s, Boltons bodied 40 Sunbeam trolleybuses. During this period, Boltons established a relationship with Commonwealth Engineering.

Boltons bodied over 400 buses and coaches for the Metropolitan Transport Trust on AEC, Albion, Daimler, Guy and Leyland chassis. It also bodied coaches for the Western Australian Government Railways and private operators.
