= Trolleybuses in Adelaide =

Adelaide trolleybus system
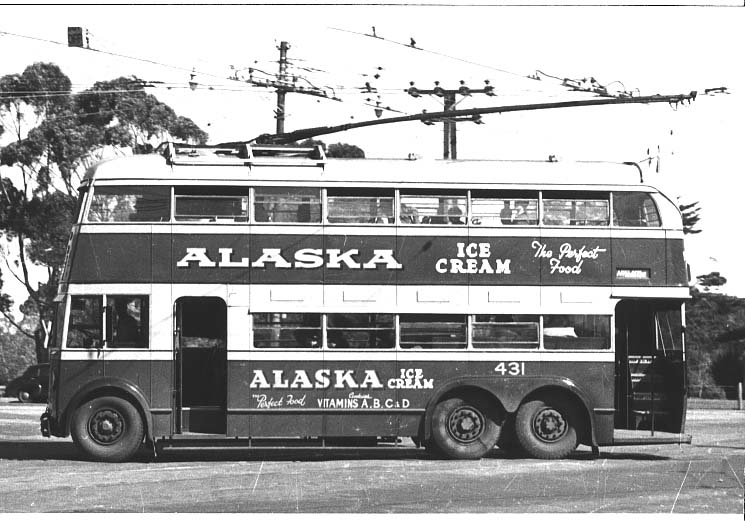
- Leyland trolleybus no. 431 in Adelaide in 1953

Operation
- Locale: Adelaide, South Australia

Statistics
Experimental system era: 1932–1934
- Status: Closed
- Operator: Municipal Tramways Trust
- Electrification: 600 V DC parallel overhead lines
- Stock: 1
Permanent system era: 1937–1963
- Status: Closed
- Operator: Municipal Tramways Trust
- Electrification: 600 V DC parallel overhead lines
- Depots: Hackney (1937–1955); Port Adelaide (1938–1963); Hackney South (1955–1963)

The Adelaide trolleybus system formed part of the public transport network in Adelaide, South Australia from 1932 until 1963.

== History ==
During the Great Depression, Adelaide's Municipal Tramways Trust (MTT) needed to expand services, but finances prevented laying new tracks. A decision was made to trial trolleybuses, and a converted petrol bus began running experimentally on the Payneham to Paradise tram line during the daily off-peak period on 18 May 1932. The trial concluded on 11 August 1934, with trams resuming operation.

The trial was judged a success and the MTT planned its first permanent trolley bus line. In September 1937, the new service commenced from Light Square in the Adelaide city centre to Tusmore. In 1938, services commenced from Light Square to Port Adelaide, Semaphore and Largs Bay.

In October 1952, the Linden Park tram line was converted followed by the Erindale line in May 1953. The trolleybus network closed on 13 July 1963 to be replaced by motor buses.

== Fleet ==
=== Green Goddess ===
Petrol bus 216 was bodied by the Islington Railway Workshops as an open top bus on a Garford chassis in 1925. It was converted to a single deck trolleybus with rear platform and stairs removed and ran from May 1932 until August 1934. It was the first trolleybus in Australia and with a distinctive cream and green livery was known as "The Green Goddess". It seated twenty-three with room for twenty standing passengers. It was later used as a maintenance vehicle before being preserved by the Tramway Museum, St Kilda.

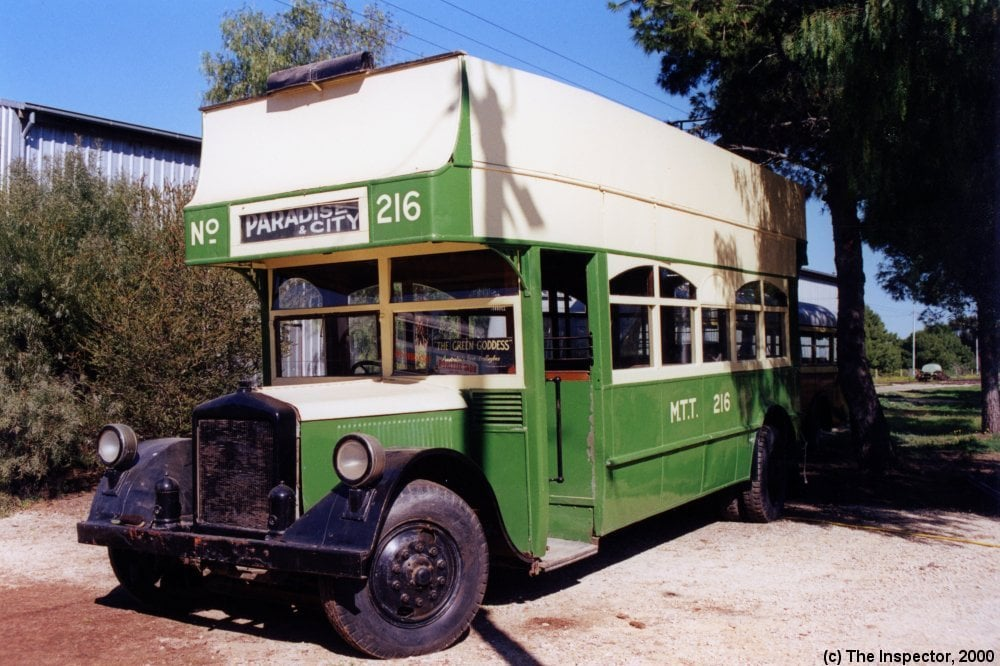
MTT 216 Green Goddess

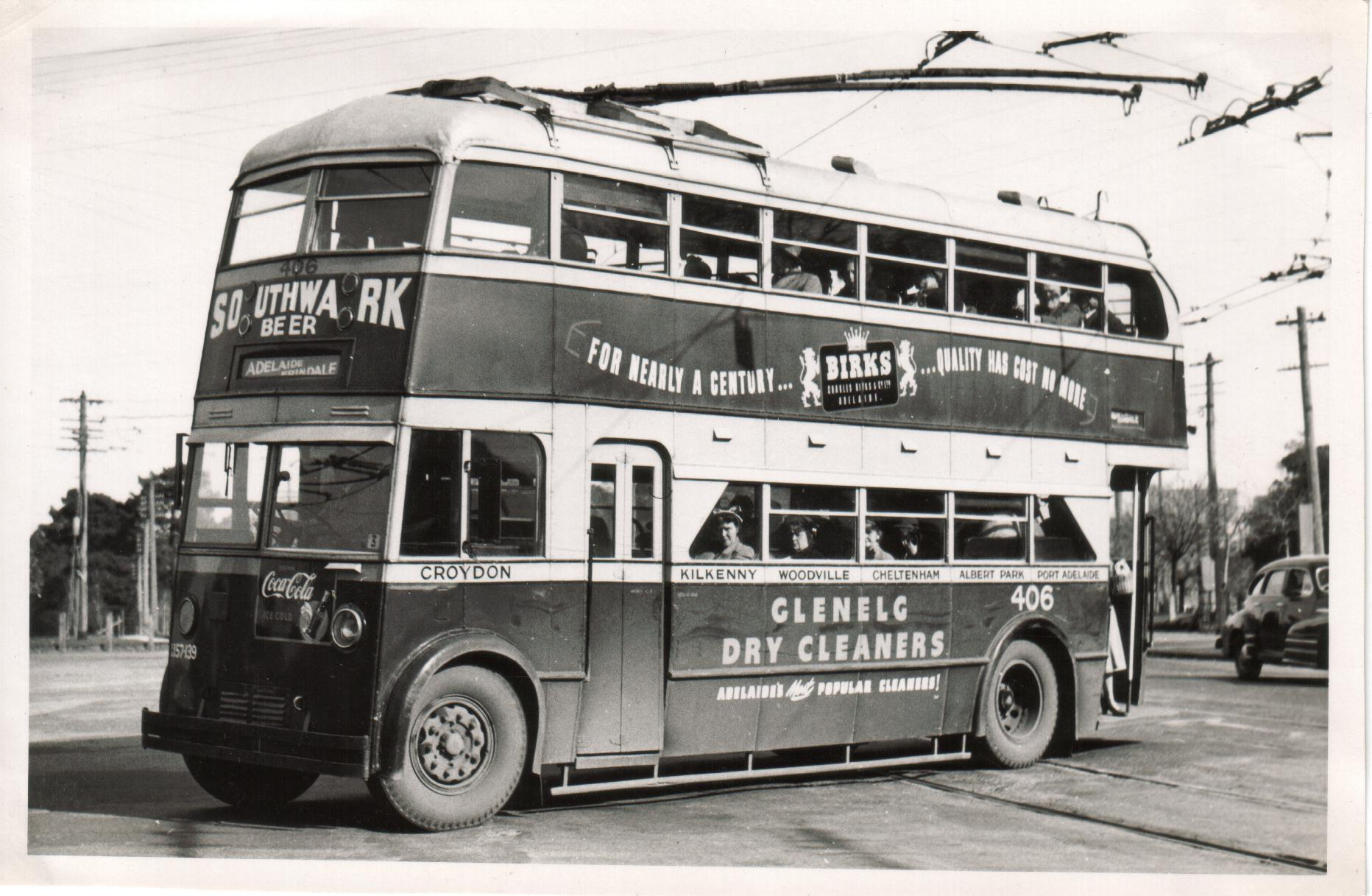
AEC 661T trolleybus no. 406

=== AEC 661T ===
To operate the permanent services, 30 AEC 661T chassis were bodied by JA Lawton & Sons in 1937 and numbered 401 to 430. The double deckers seated fifty-seven with a crush load of eighty-four with all withdrawn by June 1957, a few briefly returning to service in August 1958. ex MTT 417/S106 is preserved at the Tramway Museum, St Kilda while 413 resides on a farming property in Penfield Gardens, north of Adelaide.

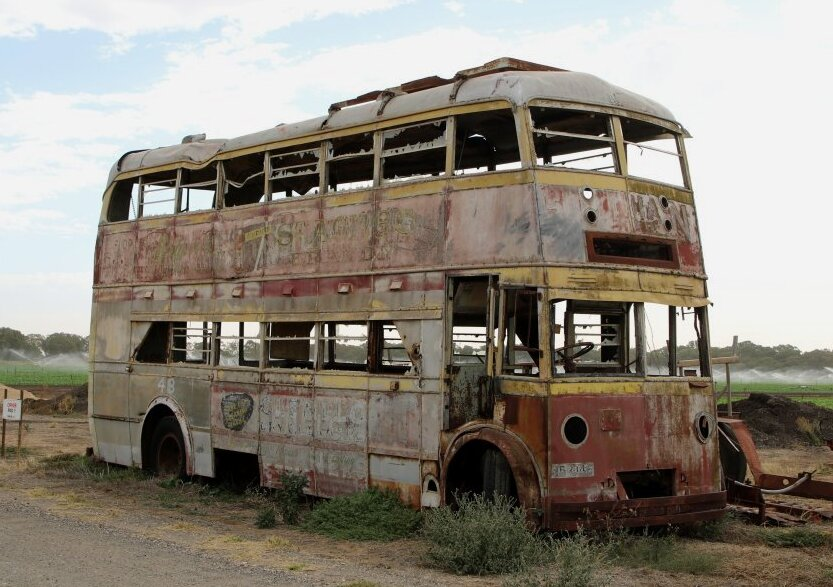
MTT AEC 413 Adelaide

=== Leyland double deck ===
In 1942, the MTT bodied five Leyland chassis using JA Lawton & Sons components, entering service as 431 to 435. These double-deck, three-axle buses were the largest in the MTT fleet and remained so until withdrawn in 1958. One was preserved by Trevor Tate before being sold to the Sydney Bus Museum in 1993.The Leyland DD that the Sydney Bus Museum had was 433, this bus was eventually returned to Adelaide for preservation by Christopher Steele but unfortunately, he died before the project could be finished, it is currently in storage at the Tramway Museum, St Kilda.

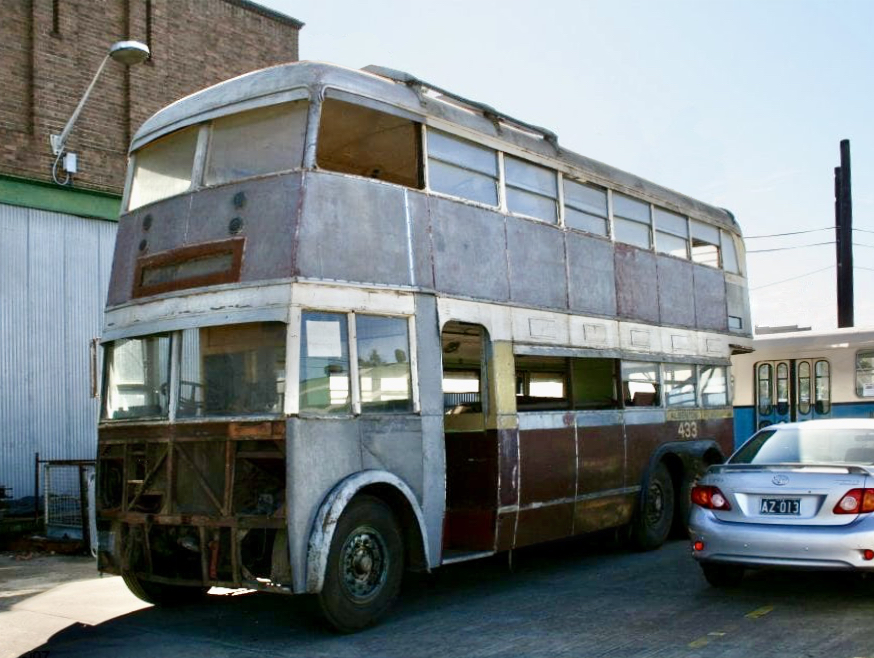
Leyland model TB5 no. 433 at the Sydney Bus Museum, in 2007

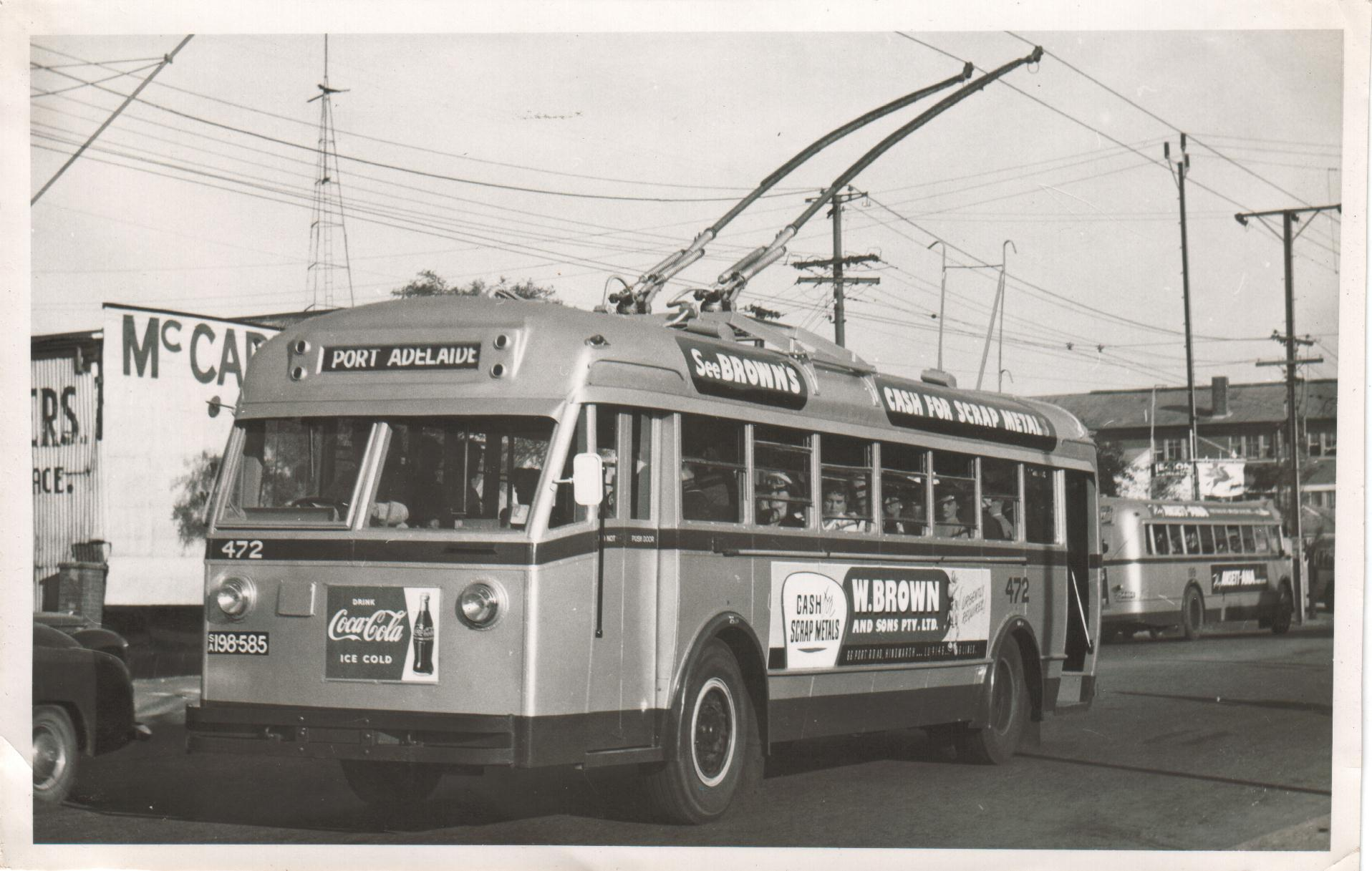
Leyland Canton trolleybus no. 472

=== Leyland Canton ===
26 Leyland chassis originally built for the Guangdong province in China, were purchased and bodied by the MTT between 1942 and 1945 and numbered 471 to 496. These single deckers had a seating capacity of thirty and a crush load of sixty. They became popularly known as cantons or wombats and remained in service until 1963. One has been preserved by the Tramway Museum, St Kilda.

=== Sunbeam MF2B ===
In 1952/53, JA Lawton & Sons bodied 30 Sunbeam MF2B chassis. These single deckers seated forty passengers, had a crush load of seventy-seven and were used on services until mid-1963. Originally numbered 497 to 526, the first four were renumbered 527 to 530 in August 1958. One has been preserved by the Tramway Museum, St Kilda.

== Livery ==
The original livery was tuscan red and deep cream with black trim. The Sunbeams entered service in a new silver and carnation red livery. Except for the five 1942 Leyland double deckers, the rest of the fleet was repainted in this livery.

== See also ==
- Buses in Adelaide
- History of Adelaide
- Public transport in Adelaide
- Tram types in Adelaide
- Tramways in Adelaide
- List of trolleybus systems
