= Double-decker bus =

Bus with two levels or decks

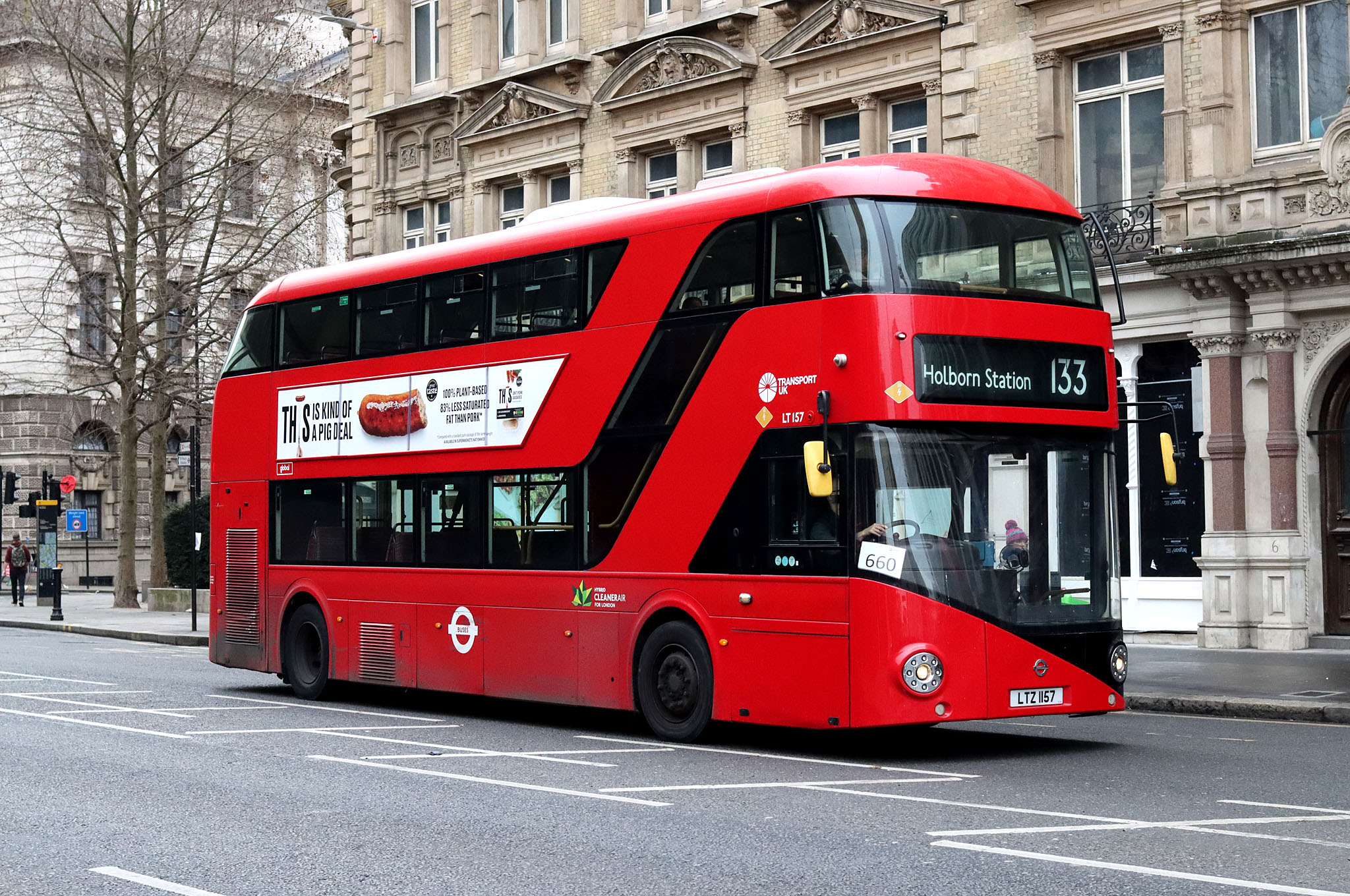
A New Routemaster double-decker bus in London

A double-decker bus is a bus that has two storeys or decks. Double-deckers are used primarily for commuter public transport, but there are coach variants for long-distance travel and open top buses that are most commonly used as sightseeing buses for tourists. They appear in many places around the world, but are presently most commonly used as mass transport in major cities.

The earliest double-decker was the horse-drawn omnibus, which appeared in Paris in 1853 and became motorised in the 1900s. Double-decker buses were popularised in Great Britain at the start of the 20th century, with the best-known example being the red London bus, namely the AEC Routemaster. Double-deckers in urban transport were also in common use in other places, such as major cities of India, but were mostly phased out by the end of the 20th century. However, they remain common in Britain as well as Ireland and Hong Kong, while in Singapore and Dhaka they have been introduced and greatly expanded in the aftermath of British colonial rule.

== Overview ==
There are several types of double-decker buses as shown in the imagebox below:

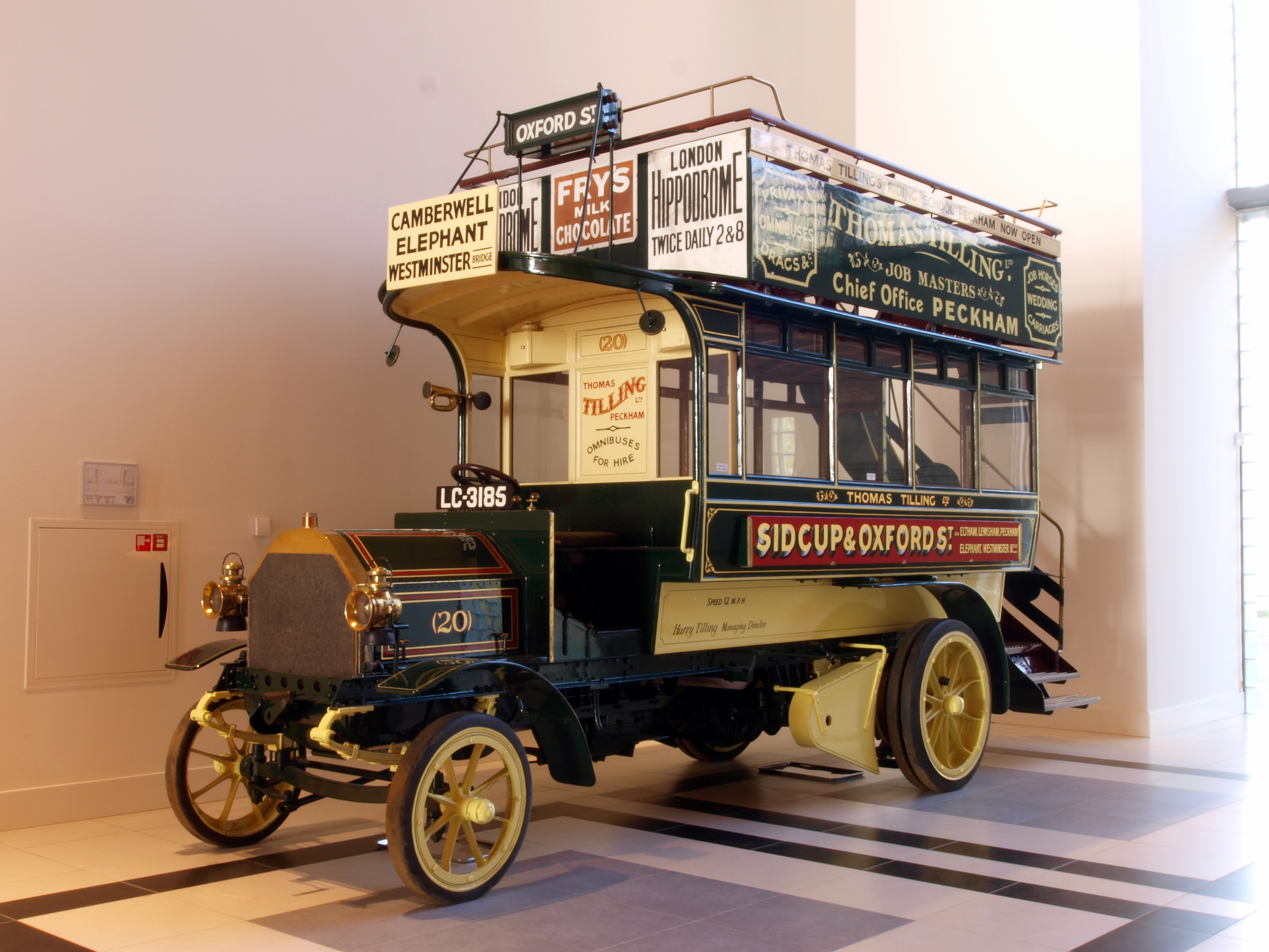
An early double-decker omnibus from c. 1904

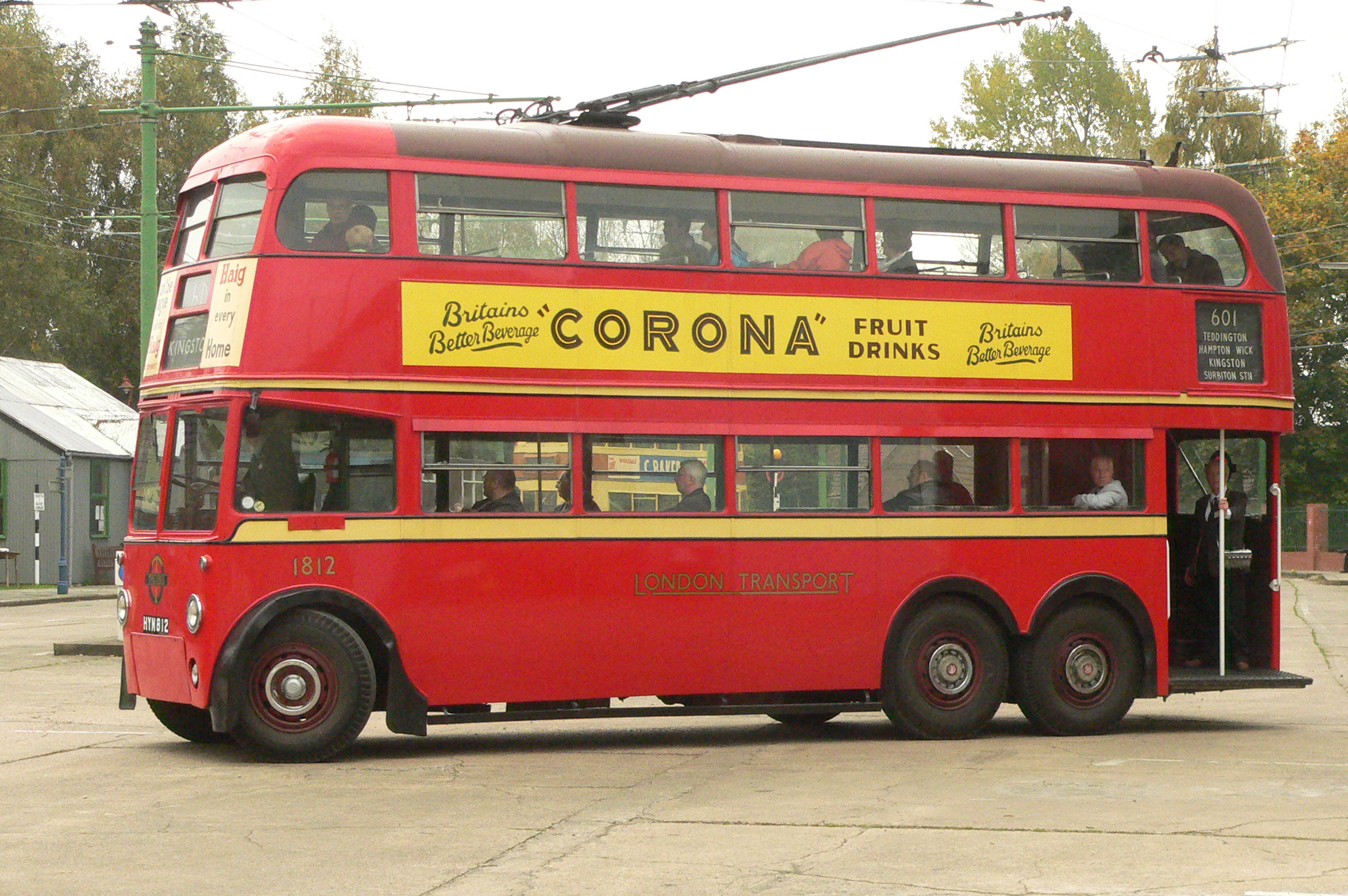
Double-decker trolleybus, now a relic of the past

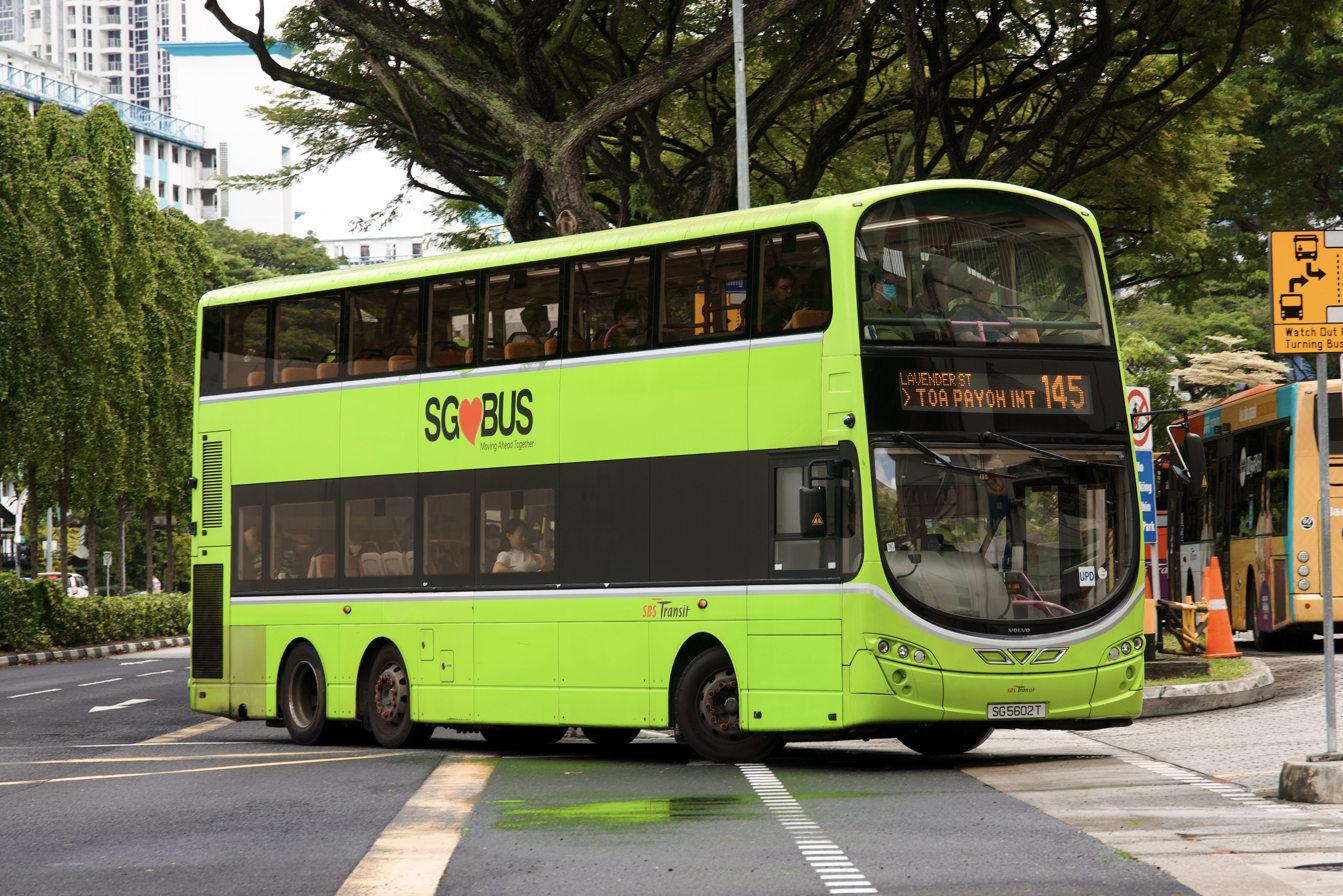
A modern double-decker bus used for urban mass transport in Singapore

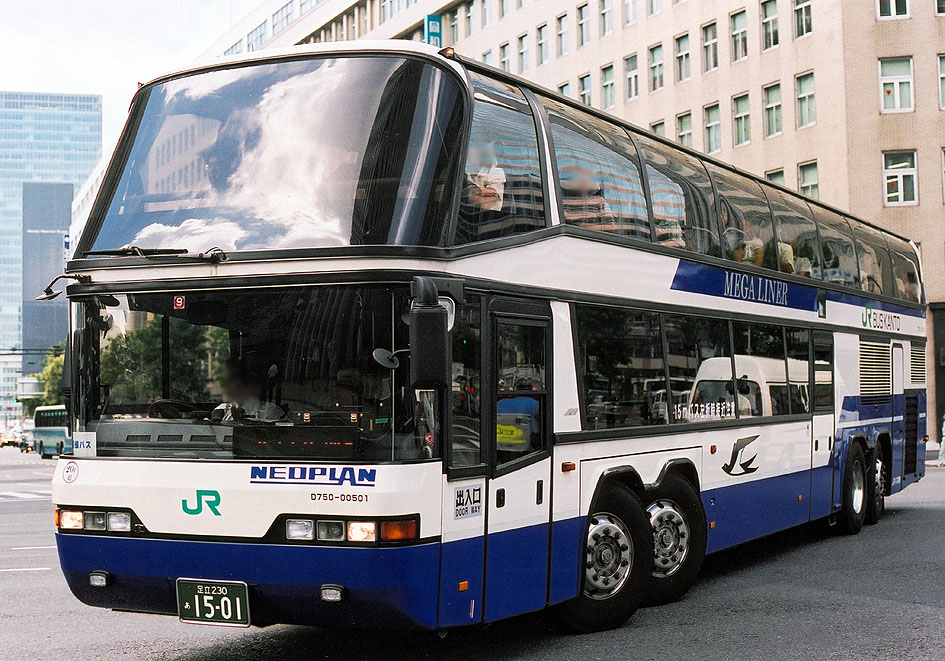
Double-decker coach bus, used for long-distance travel in Japan

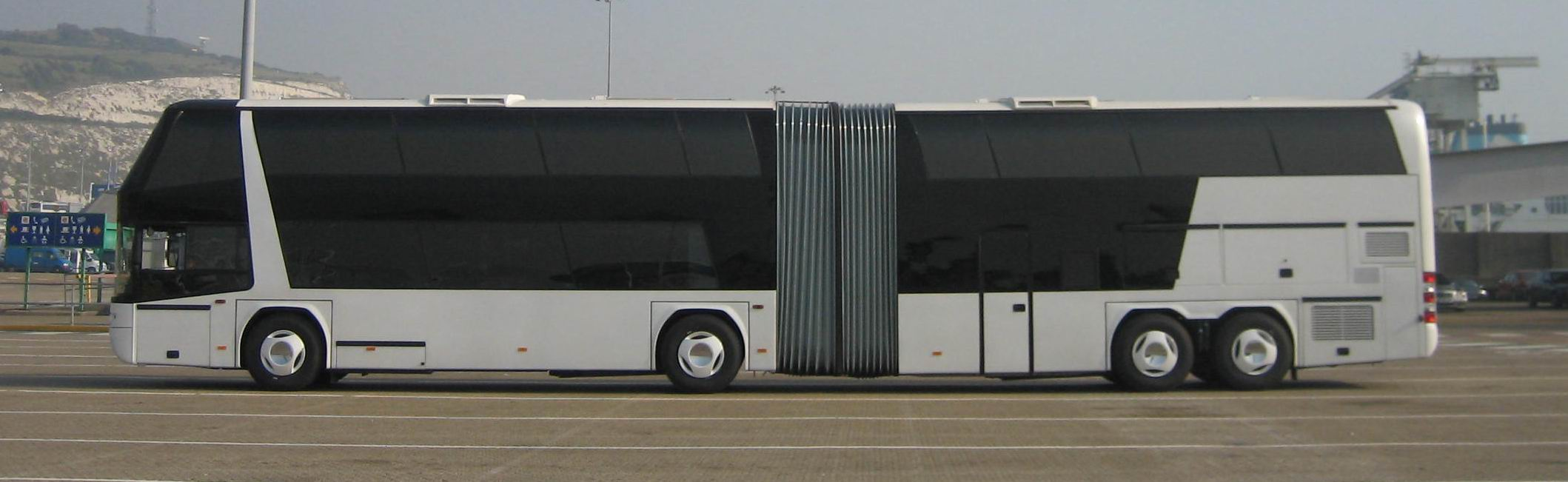
Double-decker articulated coach (concept)

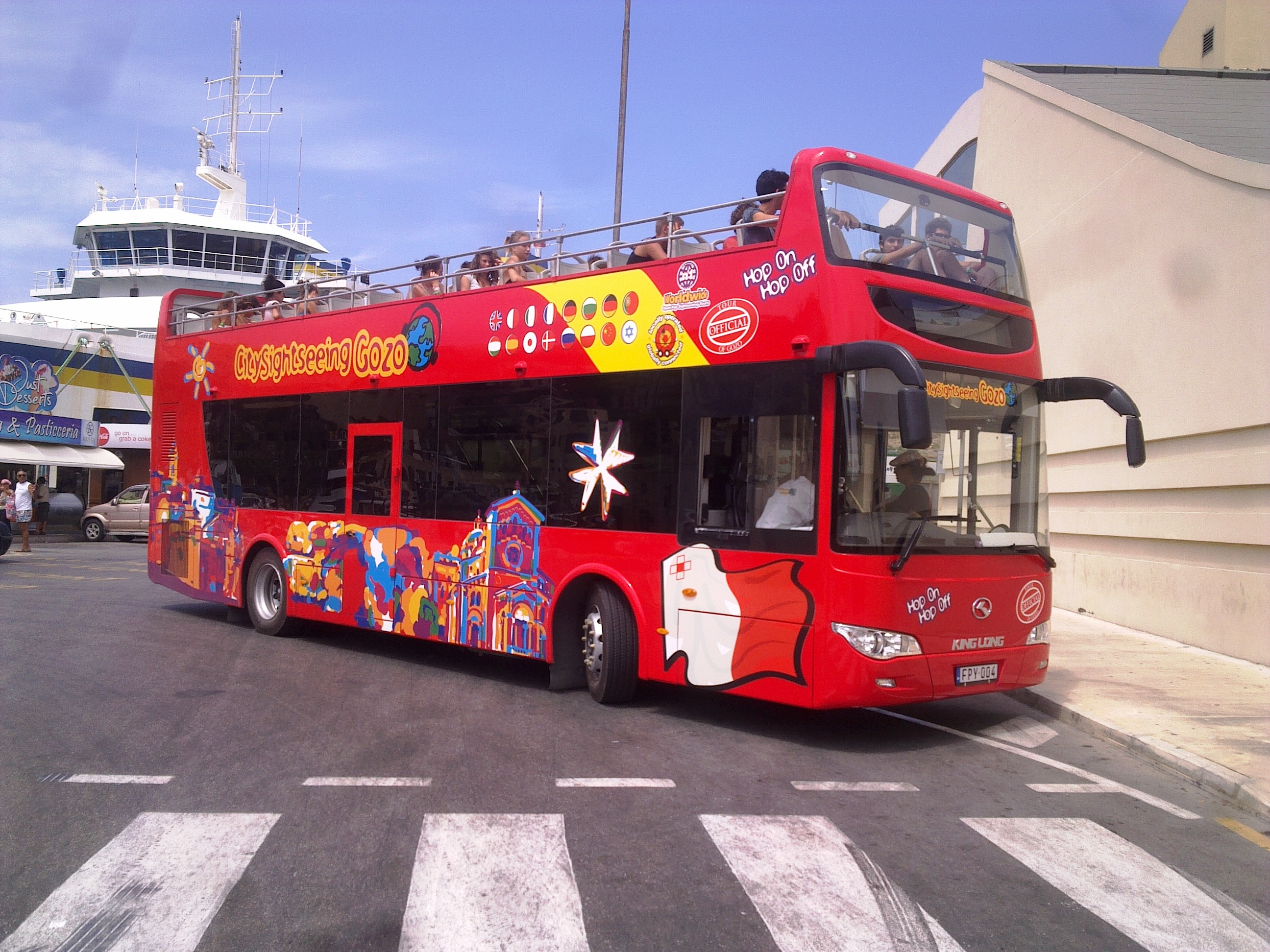
Open-top double-decker, used for tourist sightseeing

Early double-deckers put the driver in a separate cab. Passenger access was via an open platform at the rear and a bus conductor collected fares. Modern double-deckers have a main entrance door at the front and the driver takes fares, thus halving the number of workers aboard, but slowing the boarding process. The rear open platform, popular with passengers, was abandoned for safety reasons, as there was a risk of passengers falling when running and jumping onto the bus.

== By country ==
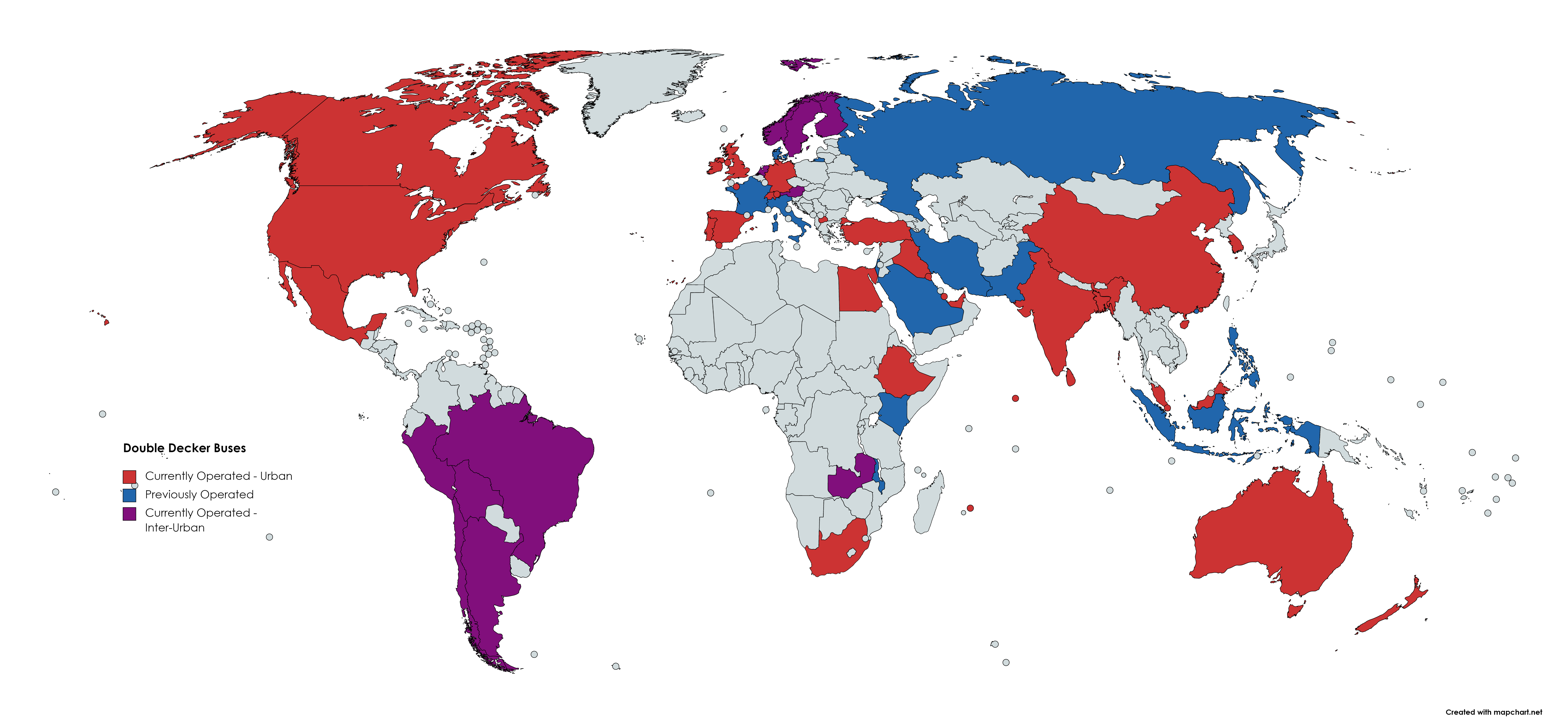
Countries with double-decker buses as a form of public transport

Cities listed here have double-decker buses as part of their regular mass transit fleet. Cities with only tourist and sightseeing double-decker buses are excluded.

=== Europe ===
In the European Union, the maximum height for any vehicle is 4 metres, for motor vehicles in categories M2 and M3 and their trailers in category 0 and motor vehicles in categories N2 and N3 and their trailers in categories 03 and 04, in national and international traffic according to Council directive 96/53/EC of 25 July 1996 and in continuity of council directive 85/3/CEE.

The United Kingdom has a triple standard for the double-decker bus: highbridge bus (urban Britain), lowbridge bus (countryside Britain) and 4 metres height coach such as the Neoplan Skyliner that can traverse Europe.

Outside the British Isles in Europe double-decker buses are most prominent in Skopje and Berlin.

==== United Kingdom ====
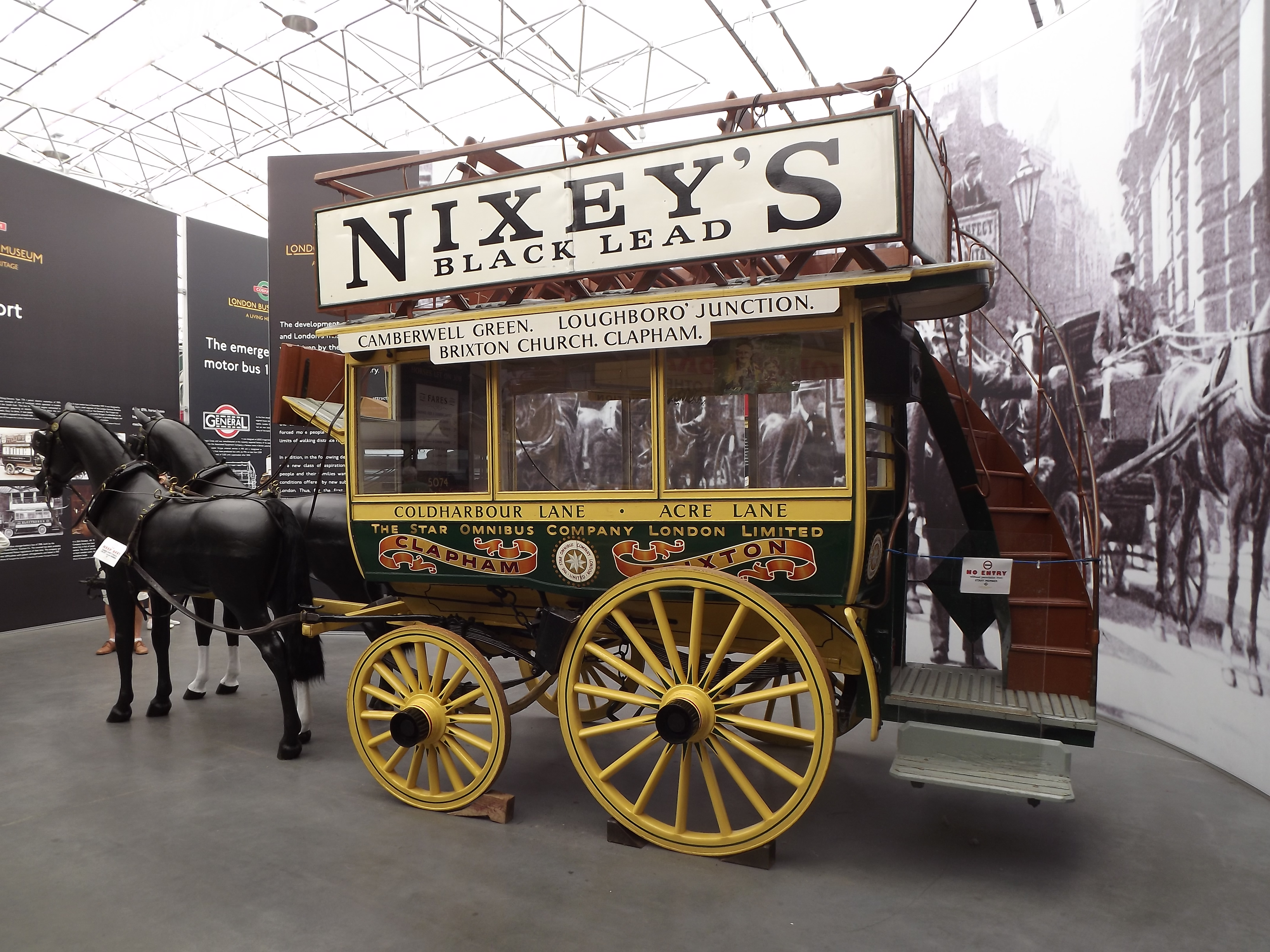
An historical Brixton to Clapham horse-drawn omnibus on display at the London Bus Museum

First appearing in London in 1947, the AEC Regent III RT (pictured) was the predecessor to the AEC Routemaster.

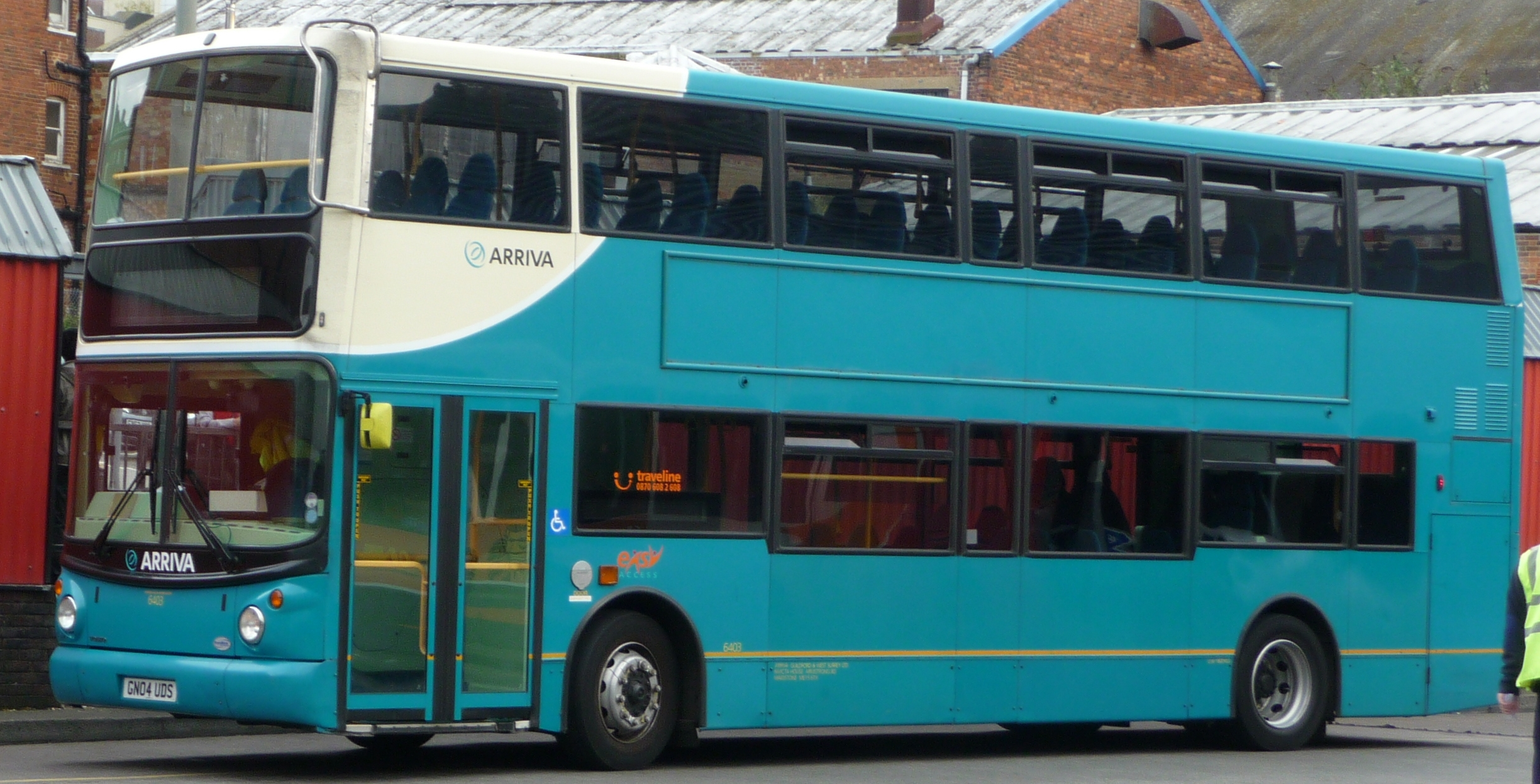
Arriva Southern Counties Volvo B7TL with TransBus ALX400 bodywork in England

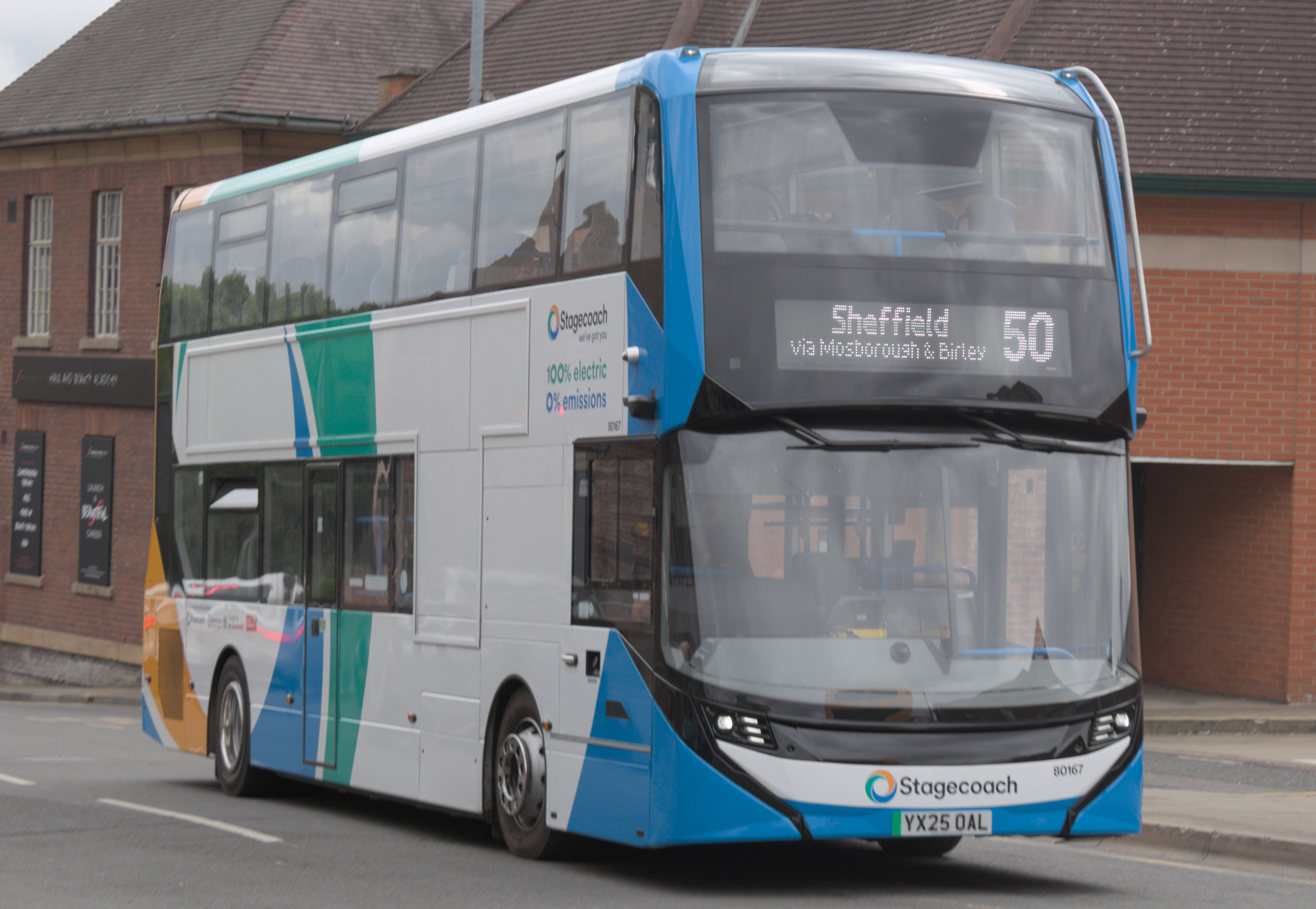
Stagecoach Yorkshire Enviro400EV electric double-decker in Chesterfield in May 2025

The first commercial horse-drawn double-decker omnibuses were introduced in England in 1847 by Adams & Co. of Fairfield, Bow; it was then improved by John Greenwood, who introduced a new double-decker in 1852. William Gladstone, speaking of London's double-deck horse-drawn omnibus, once observed that "the best way to see London is from the top of a bus".

Double-decker buses are in common use throughout the United Kingdom and have been favoured over articulated buses by many operators because of the shorter length of double-deckers and larger seating capacity; they also may be safer to operate through narrow streets and round tight corners. The majority of double-decker buses in the UK are between 9.5 metres (31 ft 2 in) and 11.1 metres (36 ft 5 in) long, the latter being more common since the mid-1990s, though there are three-axle 12-metre (39-foot-4-inch) models in service with some operators. Double-decker coaches in the UK have traditionally been 12 metres (39 feet 4 inches) in length, though many newer models are about 13.75 metres (45 ft 1 in).

The red double-decker buses in London have become a national symbol of England. Most buses in London are double-deckers. A particular example was the AEC Routemaster bus, which was a staple of the public transport network in London for nearly half a century following its introduction in 1956. The remaining Routemasters were finally retired from general service in 2005 because of the difficulty of accommodating disabled passengers. Transport for London kept these vintage buses in operation on heritage route 15H until 2020, when it was discontinued due to the COVID-19 pandemic. The contract expired in November 2020 and was not renewed; in 2021 it was announced that the service would no longer continue. There was formerly a second heritage route (9H) but this ceased operation in 2014 due to low patronage and increased operation costs.

In 2007, a hybrid-powered double-decker entered service on London Buses route 141. By late 2008, more hybrid double-deckers from three manufacturers had entered service in London. A New Routemaster was developed that year and entered service on 20 February 2012. In October 2015, London added five all-electric double-decker buses - the world's first - made by Chinese firm BYD.

The maximum permissible length of a rigid double-decker bus and coach in the UK is 15 metres (49 ft 3 in) with 3 axles and 13.5 metres (44 ft 3 in) metres with two. However, the total maximum dimensions, including trailer or articulated section, in normal circumstances are:

Dimension	Value
Length	18.75 metres (61 ft 6 in)
Width	2.55 metres (8 ft 4 in)
Height	4.95 metres (16 ft 3 in)
Mass	12,000 kilograms (26,455 lb)

Coaches are normally built to 4.38 metres (14 ft 4 in) high, while 'highbridge' buses are normally about 20 centimetres (8 in) taller. Articulated double-deckers are also allowed at a maximum length of 18.65 metres (61 ft 2 in).

===== Channel Islands =====
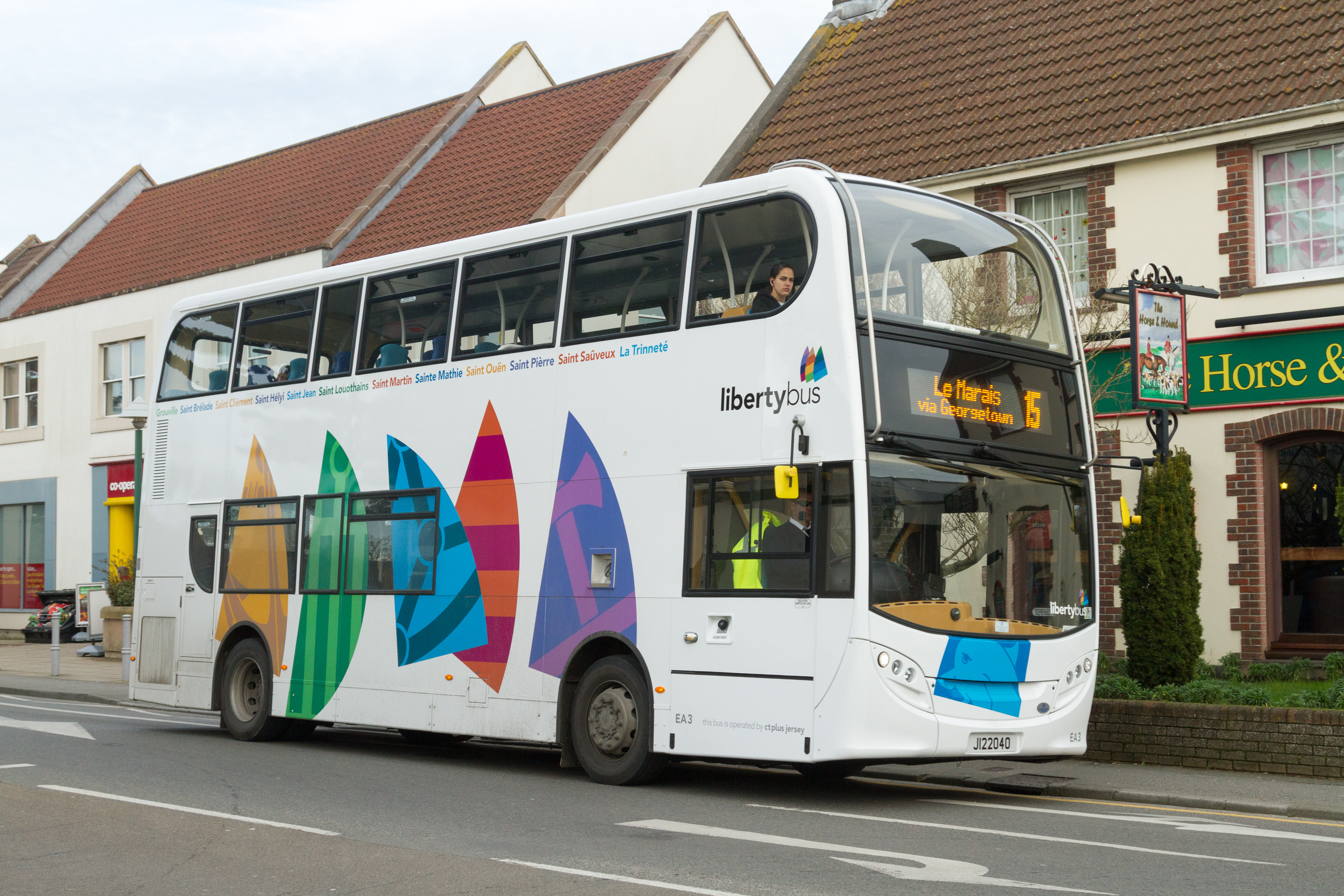
LibertyBus in Jersey

Tower Transit UK operates the Liberty Bus in Jersey, with buses.gg doing the same in Guernsey, both as part of Kelsian Group.

===== Gibraltar =====
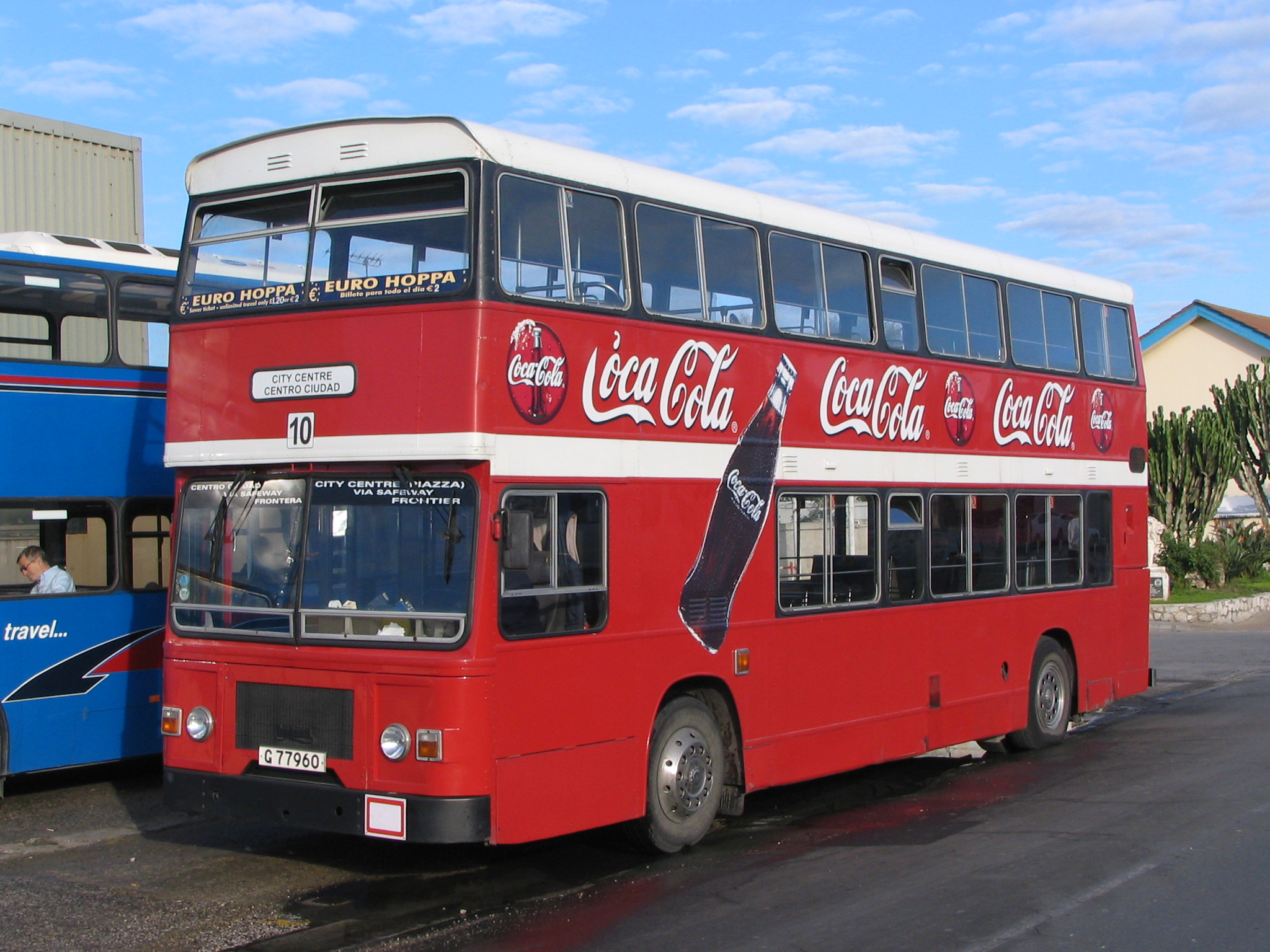
Leyland B45 (prototype of the Olympian) on route 10 in Gibraltar

In the territory of Gibraltar, Calypso Transport operates using double deckers in red livery.

===== Isle of Man =====
Bus Vannin operates about 24 double-deckers on routes all across the island.

==== Republic of Ireland ====
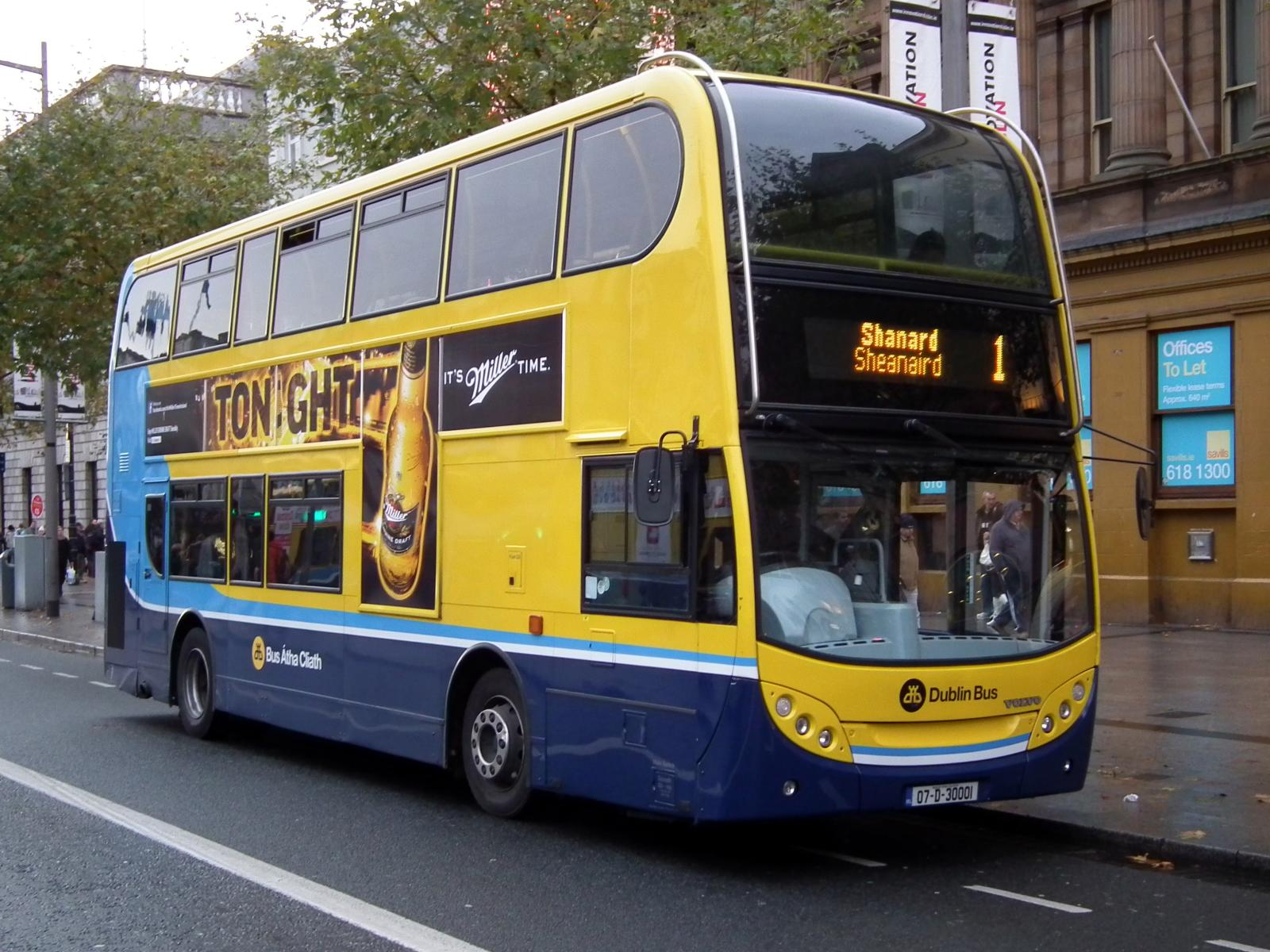
Dublin Bus Volvo B9TL

In the Republic of Ireland, the majority of the buses operated in and around the Greater Dublin area are double-deckers, operated by Dublin Bus. There are 1,000 double-decker buses (second largest in Europe after London) in the company's fleet of 1,008 (October 2019). The private operator Go-Ahead Ireland also operate a mixed fleet consisting of both double and single deck vehicles.

Bus Éireann also utilises double-decker buses on some of its commuter routes, such as the Dublin to Wicklow service. Double-deckers are also common on some of the company's city routes in Cork, Galway and Limerick. More luxurious double-deckers are used on inter-city routes, such as the X1 Dublin-Belfast or X3/X4 Dublin-Derry routes.

==== Austria ====
Double decker buses were in use on city services in Vienna between 1960 and 1991. They are used on services between Vienna and its airport, and also operated by Ötztaler Verkehrsgesellschaft (ÖVG) under contract to ÖBB-Postbus on service 4420 between Innsbruck and Lienz.

==== Bulgaria ====
Double decker buses are in service in Sofia since 2024 for tourist and some express lines.

==== Czech Republic ====
Since 2020, two Scania UNVI Urbis DD CNG buses have been running on public transport lines in Ostrava. During working days on line 78. Over the weekend and holidays during the summer season on line 88.

==== Denmark ====
Since 1970, various operators of Copenhagen city transport were using double-deckers—originally Leyland, in the 1980s–1990s MAN and in the 2000s Volvo, derivates of model B7.

==== Finland ====
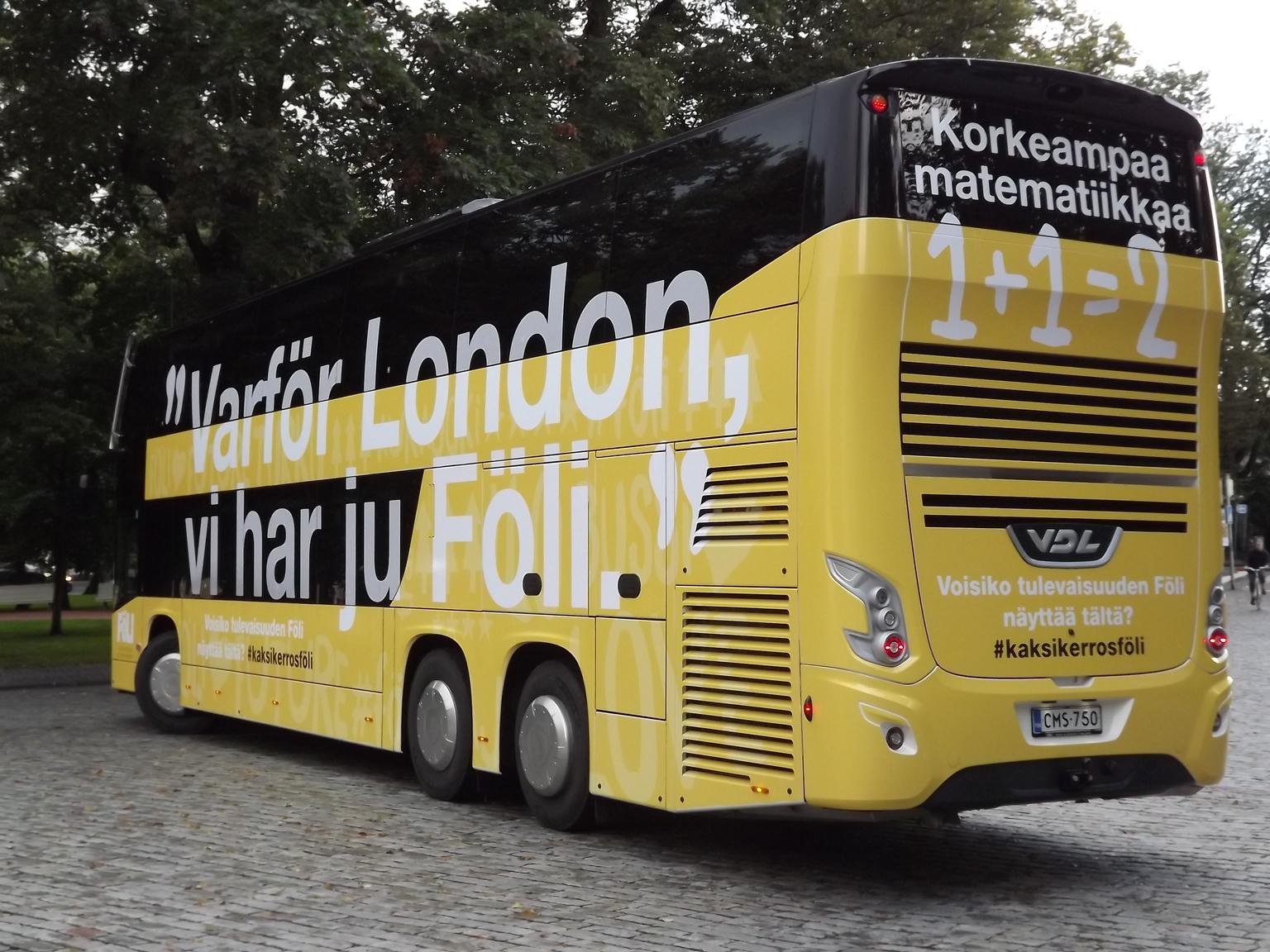
Föli double-decker coach bus in Turku, Finland

Double-decker buses are relatively rare in Finland, but there are known to be at least four Routemasters in Finland: one in Helsinki, one in Heinola, one in summer tourist charter in Espoo and one in summer tourist traffic in Kuopio. In the autumn of 2019, Public Transport of Turku, also known as Föli, was the first city to officially incorporate double-decker buses into local traffic.

==== France ====
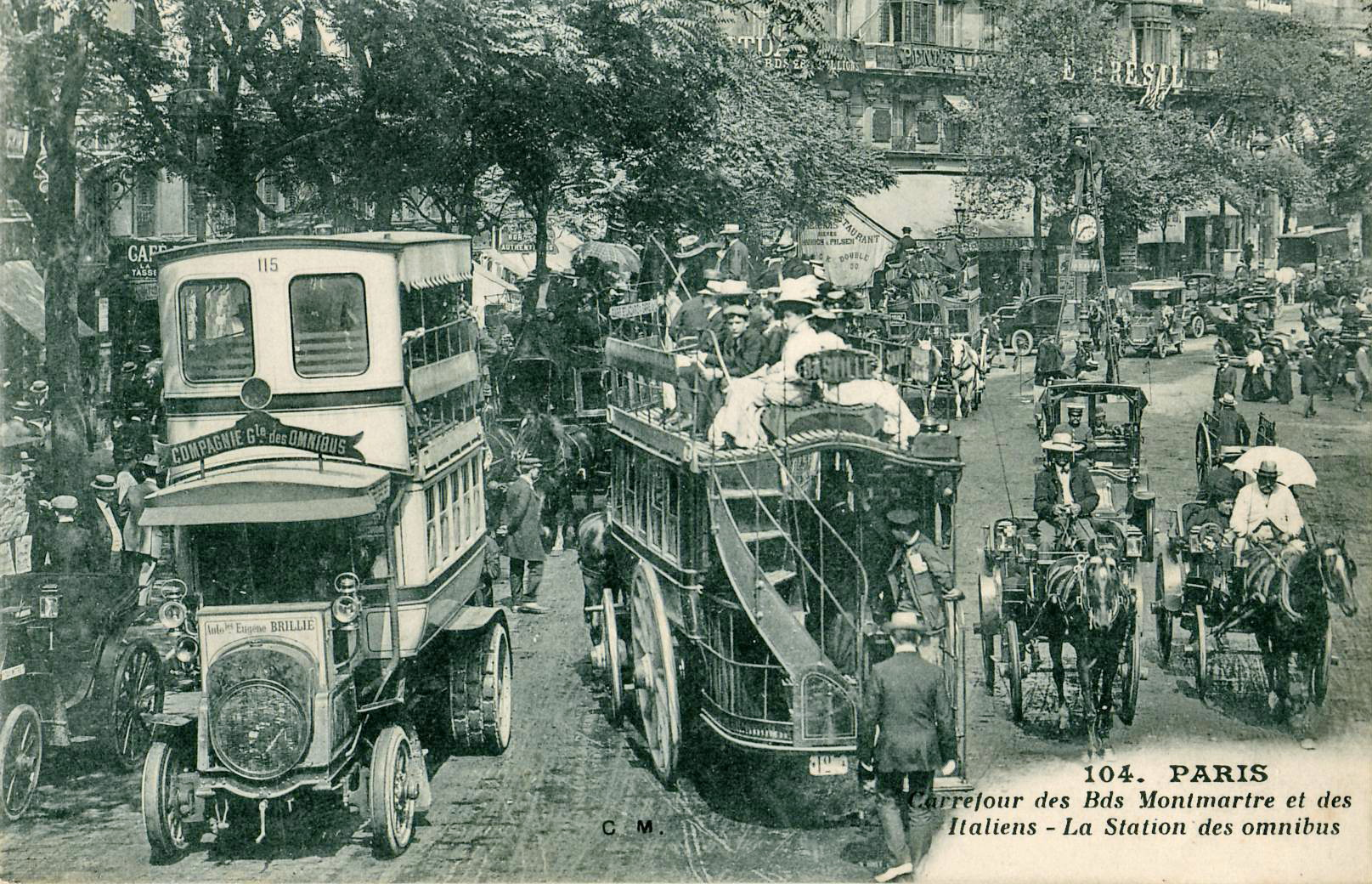
Left, double-decker bus Schneider Brillié P2; Centre, double decker horse-drawn omnibus in Paris, France

The first French double-decker bus was brought into service in Paris in 1853; it was a horse-drawn omnibus. The upper floor was cheaper and often uncovered.

The first double-decker motor bus in Paris, the Schneider Brillié P2, appeared in 1906. It was designed to carry more passengers and to replace the horse-drawn double-decker omnibus. Like trams and omnibuses, double-decker motor buses included two classes of travel: first class inside the car and second class outdoors on top. But this type of vehicle was withdrawn in 1911 because one of them overturned at place de l'Étoile; following this incident the P2s lost their upper deck and were renamed P3s.

It was not until 1966 that the RATP re-tried double-deckers on two lines in Paris. A prototype built by Berliet (type E-PCMR), was put into service in 1966, with an order being placed for 25 vehicles. The first production car was commissioned on 19 June 1968 for line 94, Gare Montparnasse - Levallois. On 17 February 1969, line 53, Opera - Porte d'Asnieres was in turn equipped with this model. But traffic problems caused RATP to definitively abandon this vehicle in 1977, because this type of bus was found to be poorly suited to the structure of the Paris network, the stops being too close to each other, preventing people from going upstairs. Consequently, there are no Parisian bus routes using double-deckers.

SITAC operates a service 5 between Calais and Sangatte using a double decker bus.

==== Germany ====
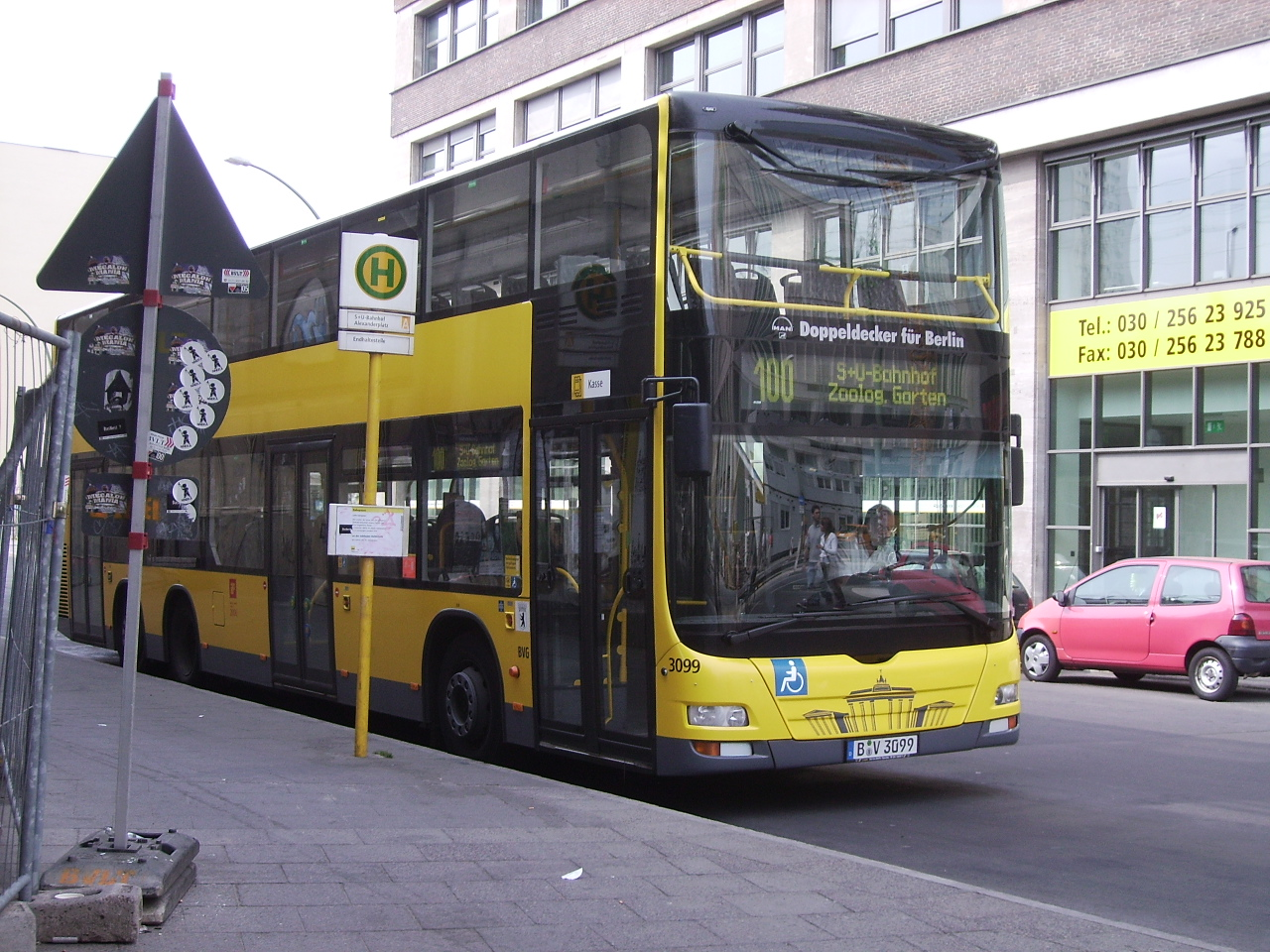
MAN A39 in Berlin, Germany

In Germany, double-decker buses in Berlin are operated by Berliner Verkehrsbetriebe (BVG). Berlin has had the largest double-decker fleet on continental Europe with 197 vehicles operating as of 2023 (compared to 484 single-deckers and 928 articulated buses). However it used to be higher: 1,000 in 1992, reduced to 450 in 2002. The city originally had double-decker buses at least since the 1920s.

The models in operation in 2004 were 13.5 metres (44 ft 3 in) long and held around 95 passengers. The replacements, which are supplied by Neoman Bus, are 1.8 metres (5 ft 11 in) longer. The new buses are able to hold 128 passengers.

==== Italy ====
During the 1960s and 1970s, major cities like Turin, Milan, Rome, Florence, Verona, Bologna, Rimini, Naples, Bari and Palermo adopted Fiat double decker buses.

The most common model was the Fiat 412 Aerfer, and in 1961 it was replaced by Fiat 413 Viberti Monotral CV61.

==== Liechtenstein ====
Liemobil operates four double decker MAN A39 buses on service 11 between Sargans, Switzerland and Feldkirch, Vorarlberg, Austria and on other services 12, 13 and 14 in the country.

==== Netherlands ====
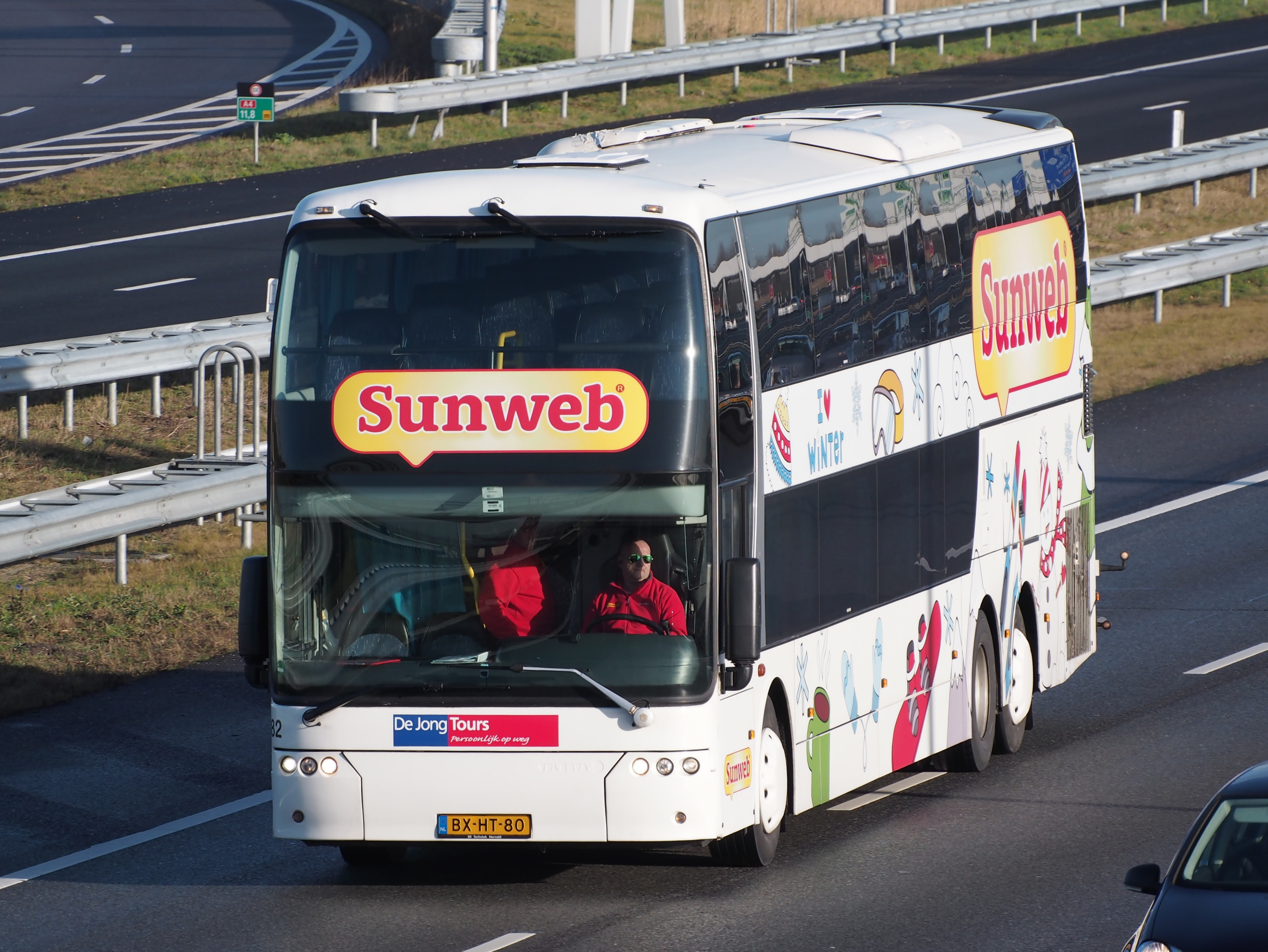
Double Decker tour coach in the Netherlands

It is only very recently that double-decker buses have started to be used in the Netherlands. On 10 December 2017 Connexxion put 18 three-axle double-deckers into service on route 346 between Haarlem and Amsterdam Zuid, a heavily used commuter route not served by rail. They are Futura FDD2s built by VDL Bus & Coach in Valkenswaard, are 14.1 metres (46 feet) long, and carry 86 seated passengers. Their introduction was not entirely without issues since their route initially had to be diverted to avoid passing under a dangerously low tram overhead wire near the VU Medical Centre stop.

Also in December 2017, Qbuzz introduced five double-deckers on its route 300 between Groningen and Emmen. These are Van Hool TDX27 Astromegas, also 14.1 metres (46 feet) long and carrying 85 passengers.

==== North Macedonia ====
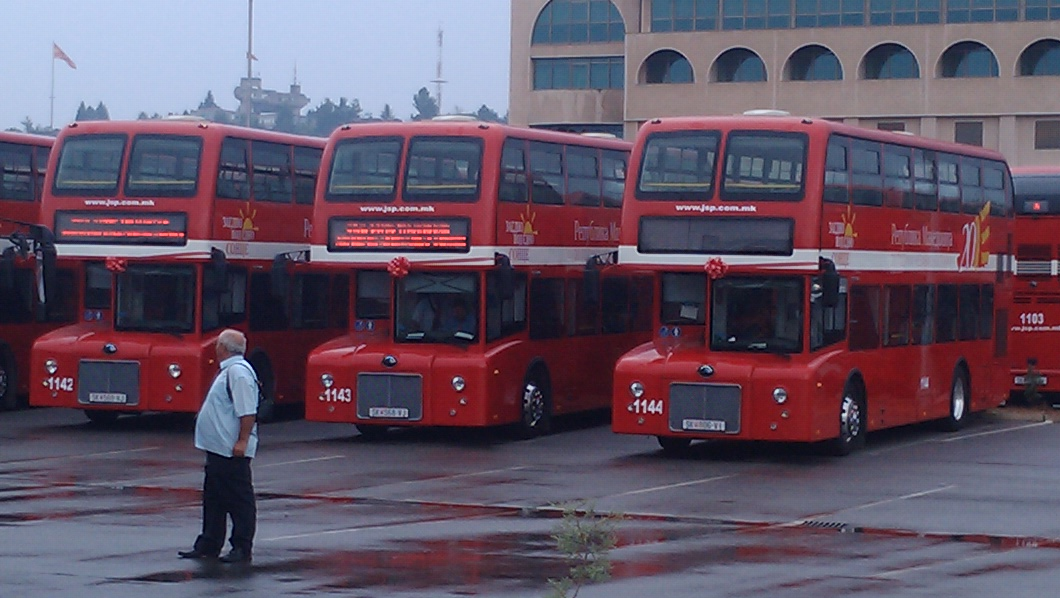
Yutong City Master in Skopje, North Macedonia

The North Macedonian government bought 217 Yutong City Master double-decker city buses for local transport in Skopje, the capital, built in China's Zhengzhou Yutong factory. The buses were put into operation on 8 September 2011, coinciding with the day of Macedonian independence. This model of bus has capacity for 80 passengers. They represent most of the 312 buses currently in operation by the Skopje public transport company.

==== Norway ====
In June 2008 Boreal Transport on contract with Kolumbus introduced three double-decker buses to provide more seating for certain high-traffic departures in Stavanger.

==== Poland ====
PKS Szczecin since 2021.

==== Portugal ====
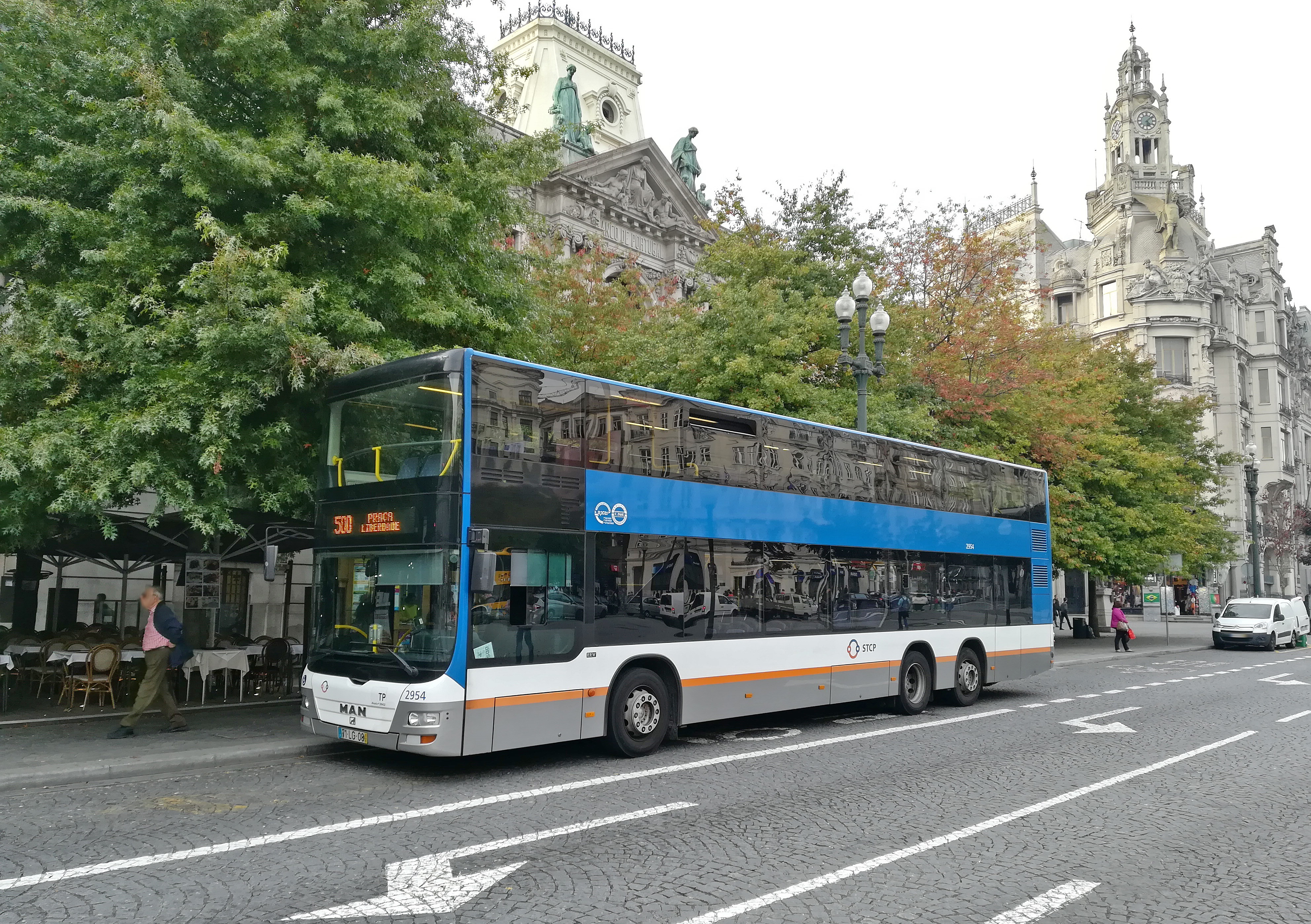
MAN A39 double-deck bus on route 500 in Porto, Portugal

Double-decker buses were introduced in Portugal during the 1950s when buses in general started to be used in the main cities such as Lisbon, Porto, Coimbra and Setúbal. The types used were the AEC Regent and later the Daimler Fleetline and the Leyland Atlantean, with Portuguese-built bodies. There was also one Leyland Olympian as a demonstration vehicle in Lisbon. In Porto, there were double-decker trolleybuses, produced by Lancia and with Dalfa bodywork, in use from the mid-1960s until the mid-1990s. Double-decker buses were not in widespread use for normal service but were mainly used for sightseeing purposes. They were most commonly Portuguese-produced vehicles, including rebodies of regular service buses (for example, the Volvo B10R from Carristur), as well as some from former companies, such as the MAN SD202 from BVG Berlin, many of them still in circulation.

The absence of double-decker buses on regular service lasted until 2011, when STCP acquired 15 double-decker buses, of the type MAN A39 (as used in Berlin). They were introduced at an event by the company, named "Duplex Tour", on 26 February 2011 and put into normal service on the 28th of that month. These buses can be seen usually on route 500.

==== Russia ====
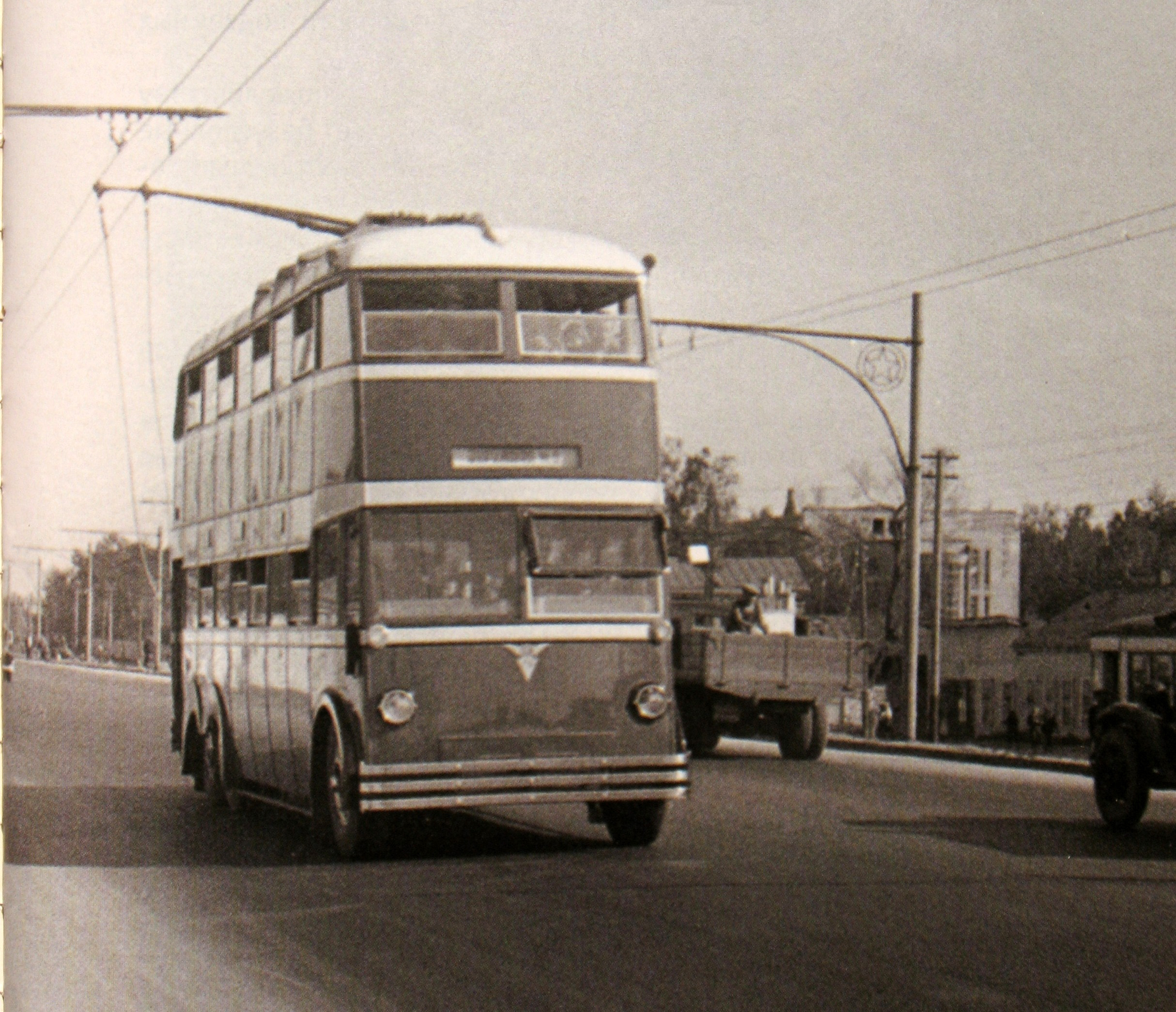
YaTB-3 trolleybus on Leningradskoye Highway in Moscow, 1930s

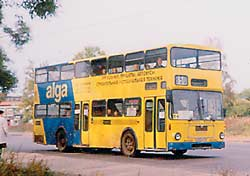
MAN SD200 on route T-4 in Saint-Petersburg in 2000s

Between 1938 and 1941, and later between 1945 and 1948, a few double-decker trolleybuses YaTB-3, built by Yaroslavl Motor Plant and based on AEC 664T chassis, were operated in Moscow. Only 10 were built.

Until 2011 double-decker buses were operating in the city of Barnaul. The double-decker fleet consisted of seven MAN SD200 and MAN SD202 second hand buses imported from Berlin. Those buses were used on routes 3, 10 and 17.

In the mid-1990s, some double-deckers were operated briefly in Saint Petersburg.

==== Spain ====
Double-decker buses were introduced in 2014 in Bilbao by the city bus operator Bilbobus. They are not the first double deck vehicles in the city as ex-London Transport Q1 trolleybuses were sold to Bilbao after the end of London trolleybus operations in 1962 and were operated until the system's closure in 1978. Initially, six vehicles are operating on Bilbobus route 56. They have a capacity of 132 passengers - 80 seated and fifty standing.

==== Sweden ====
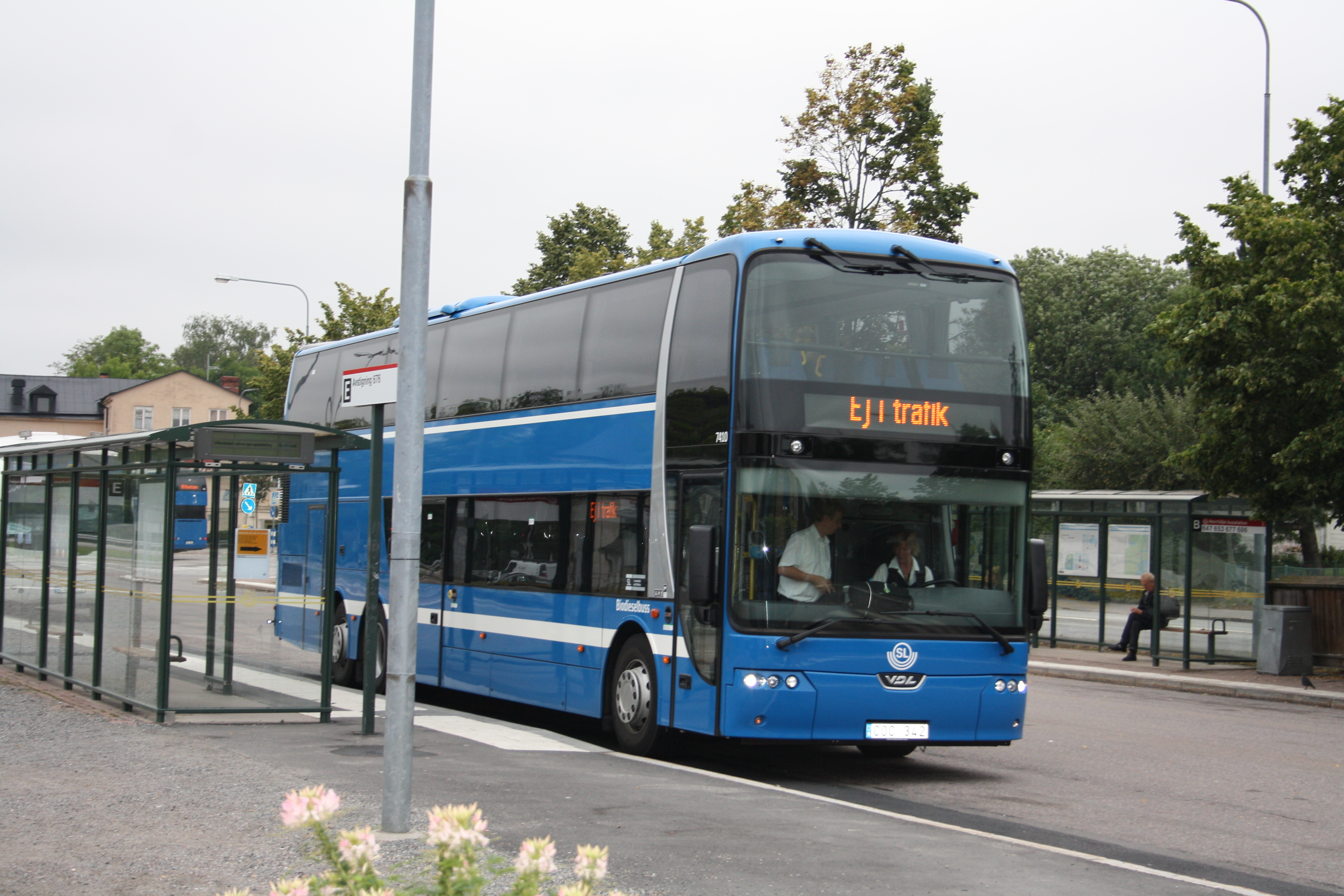
VDL Synergy double-decker bus in Norrtälje, Sweden

Sweden bought in 1965 50 Leyland Atlantean double-decker buses with Park Royal bodies. Leyland claimed they were the first double-decker buses with one man operation. They had two staircases and two pairs of doors. The Atlanteans were not replaced at the end of their revenue service life in 1974. However, in 2011 double-deckers returned to Sweden on revenue duties with VDL Synergy on in the SL 676 Stockholm Östra - Norrtälje line. Norrtälje is located around 70 km north of Stockholm.

==== Switzerland ====
In Switzerland Postauto operate double decker buses on a route between Engelburg–St Gallen–Heiden routes and in the Obertoggenburg region and in the regions of Rorschach and Goldach. 19 Alexander Dennis Enviro500 have been ordered to operate on these services, which seat 80 passengers and can carry 48 standing. Four double deckers are also operated in Graubünden which are due to be replaced within the next two years.

==== Turkey ====
In Turkey, the Istanbul public transit system (IETT) runs 89 double-decker buses on longer-distance routes, most notably commuter buses crossing the Bosphorus Bridge linking the European and the Asiatic sides of the city. Double-decker buses are also used on routes to and from Taksim Square to far-flung western suburbs such as Büyükçekmece and Bahçeşehir.

=== Africa ===
==== Egypt ====
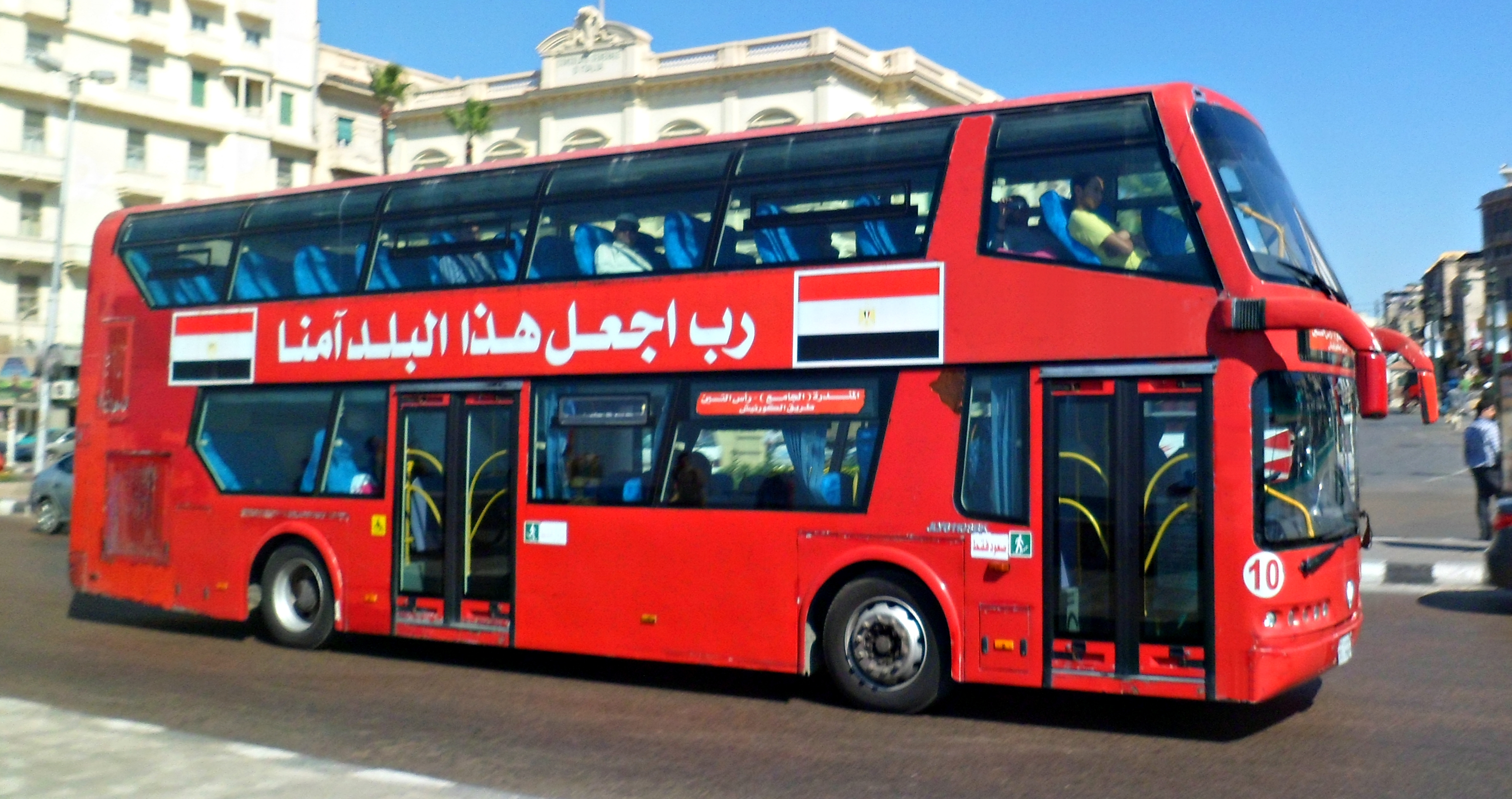
A double-decker bus in Alexandria, Egypt

Several cities in Egypt use double-decker buses as part of their public transportation systems, including Cairo. The MAN Lion's City buses, manufactured in Egypt in 2018, were introduced in Cairo to address provide greater capacity on its bus network. Red double-decker buses are also a feature of Alexandria's bus network.

==== Ethiopia ====
In 2017, as part of a larger order of 850 new buses, the city of Addis Ababa purchased a fleet of 50 double-decker buses to operate routes on its public transportation system. Of these, 25 are operated by the Anbessa City Bus Service Enterprise and 25 are part of the Sheger bus company's fleet; both are government-owned.

==== Kenya ====
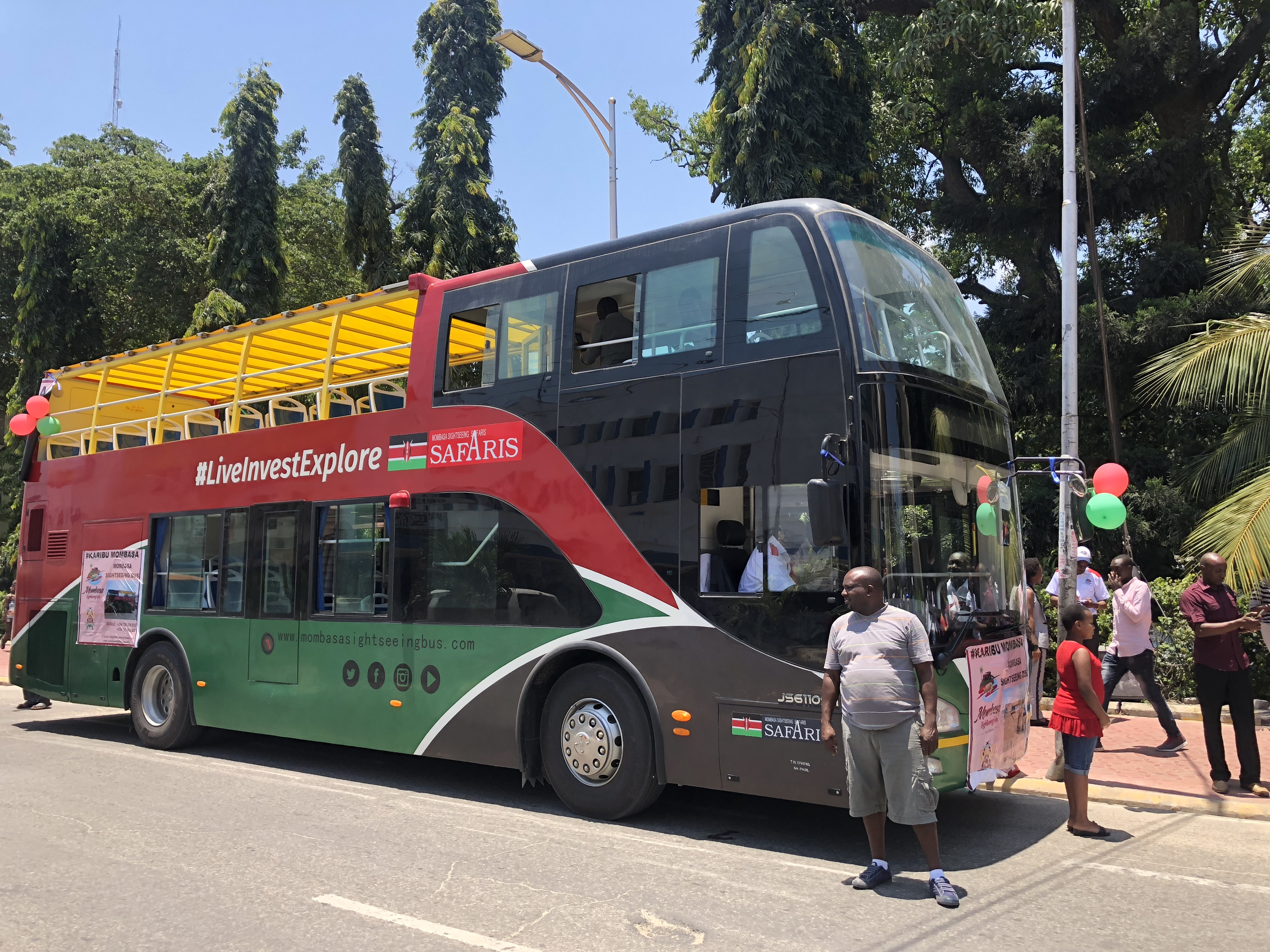
A double-decker bus on its first day of operation in Mombasa, Kenya

A fleet of double-decker buses operate in Mombasa, running a route aimed at tourists. The buses are open top, and run on a hop-on hop-off sightseein route around the city; they are manufactured by Yaxing Coach. Since 2014, a double-decker bus owned by the City Shuttle Bus Company also provides public transportation in Nairobi.

==== Malawi ====
In Malawi, multiple companies utilize fleets of double-decker buses for intercity bus services. Modern Marcopolo buses run direct routes between the nation's two largest cities, Lilongwe and Blantyre. New double-decker buses are also in use on more regional routes, including those connecting cities like Mangochi, Mzimba, and Mzuzu.

==== Morocco ====
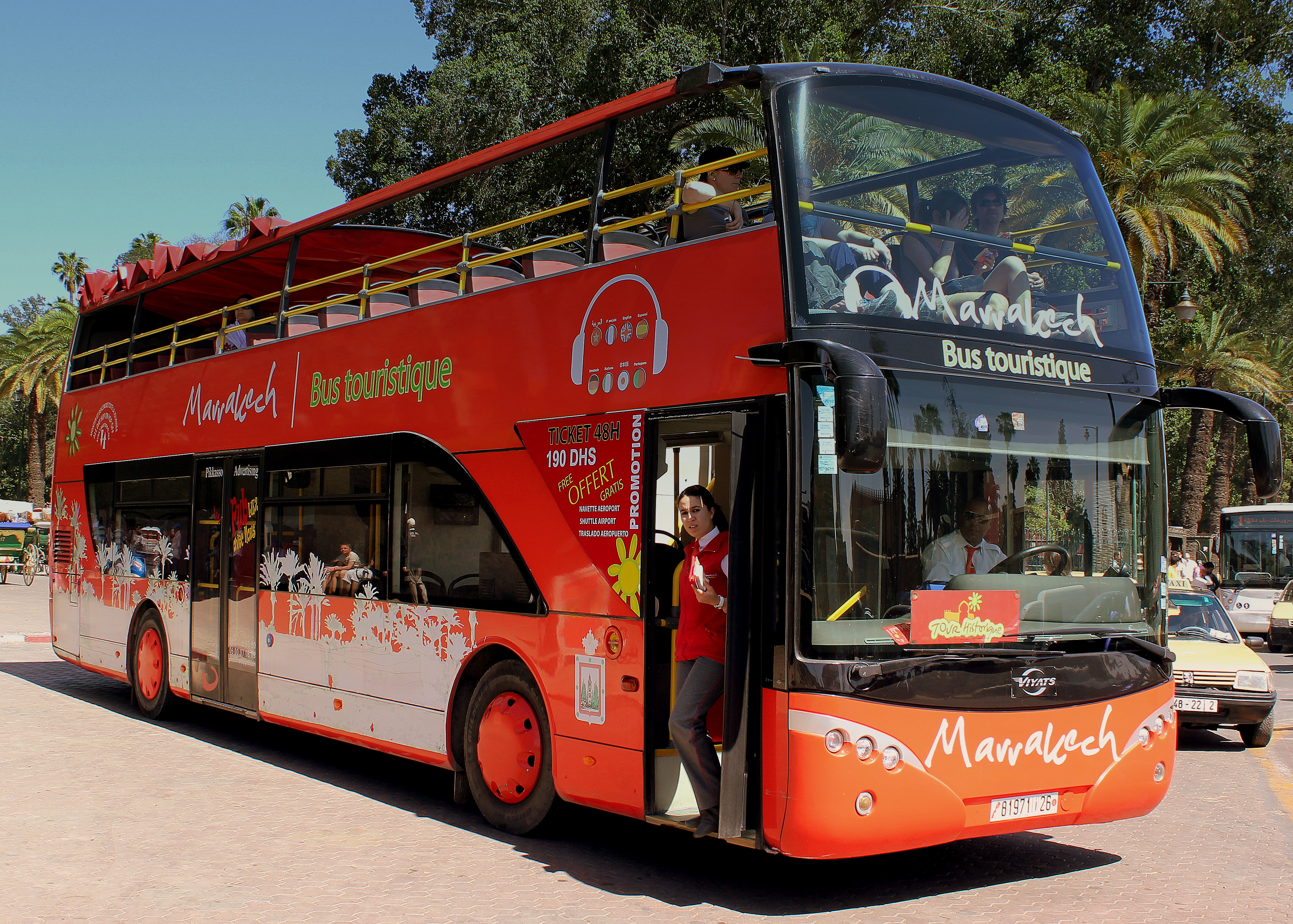
A double-decker bus in Marrakesh, Morocco

In Morocco, there are double-decker buses in cities like Marrakesh and Tangier.

==== South Africa ====
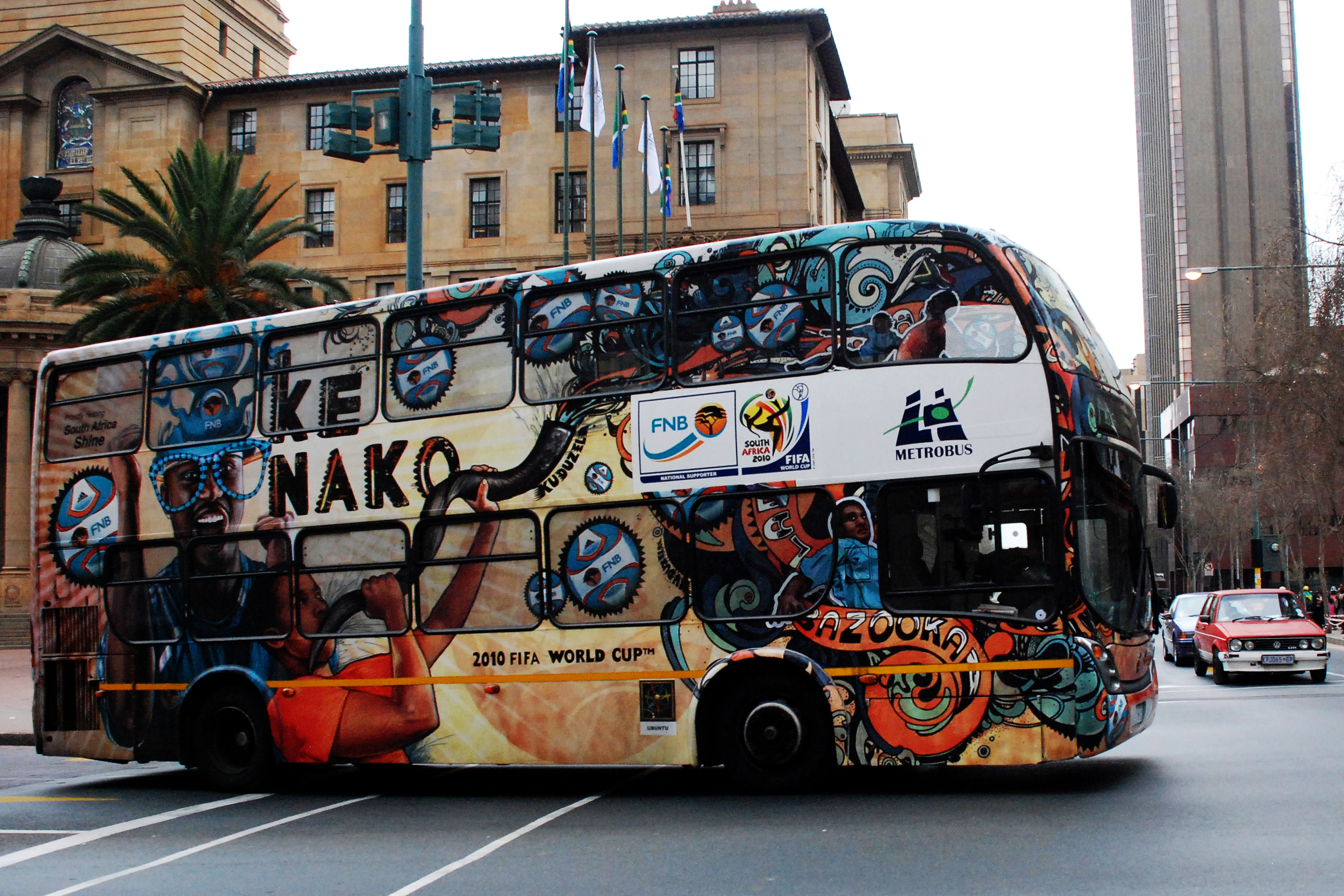
Johannesburg Metrobus

Double-decker buses are a feature of a number of transportation systems in South Africa. Johannesburg's public bus system, known as Metrobus and operated by the city, has 550 buses that run on 84 routes throughout the city. Of these, 150 are modern double-decker buses manufactured by Volvo, Scania, and Marcopolo. The City of Tshwane Metropolitan Municipality in Gauteng Province boasts 113 double-decker buses among its public transportation fleet. Golden Arrow Bus Services, the main operator of bus services in Cape Town, is the owner of recently acquired double-decker MAN Lion's City buses.

Like in other countries across Southern Africa, double-decker buses are often utilized by private companies for intercity transport connecting major population centers, as well as linking South African cities with hubs in Botswana, Malawi, Mozambique, Namibia, and Zimbabwe. A number of tourism companies offer open top, double-decker bus sightseeing tours of major cities in South Africa.

==== Zambia ====
Double-decker buses are used by a number of private companies in Zambia for intercity bus services, both domestically connecting Lusaka and other cities across the country and internationally to cities like Johannesburg.

=== East Asia ===
==== Mainland China ====
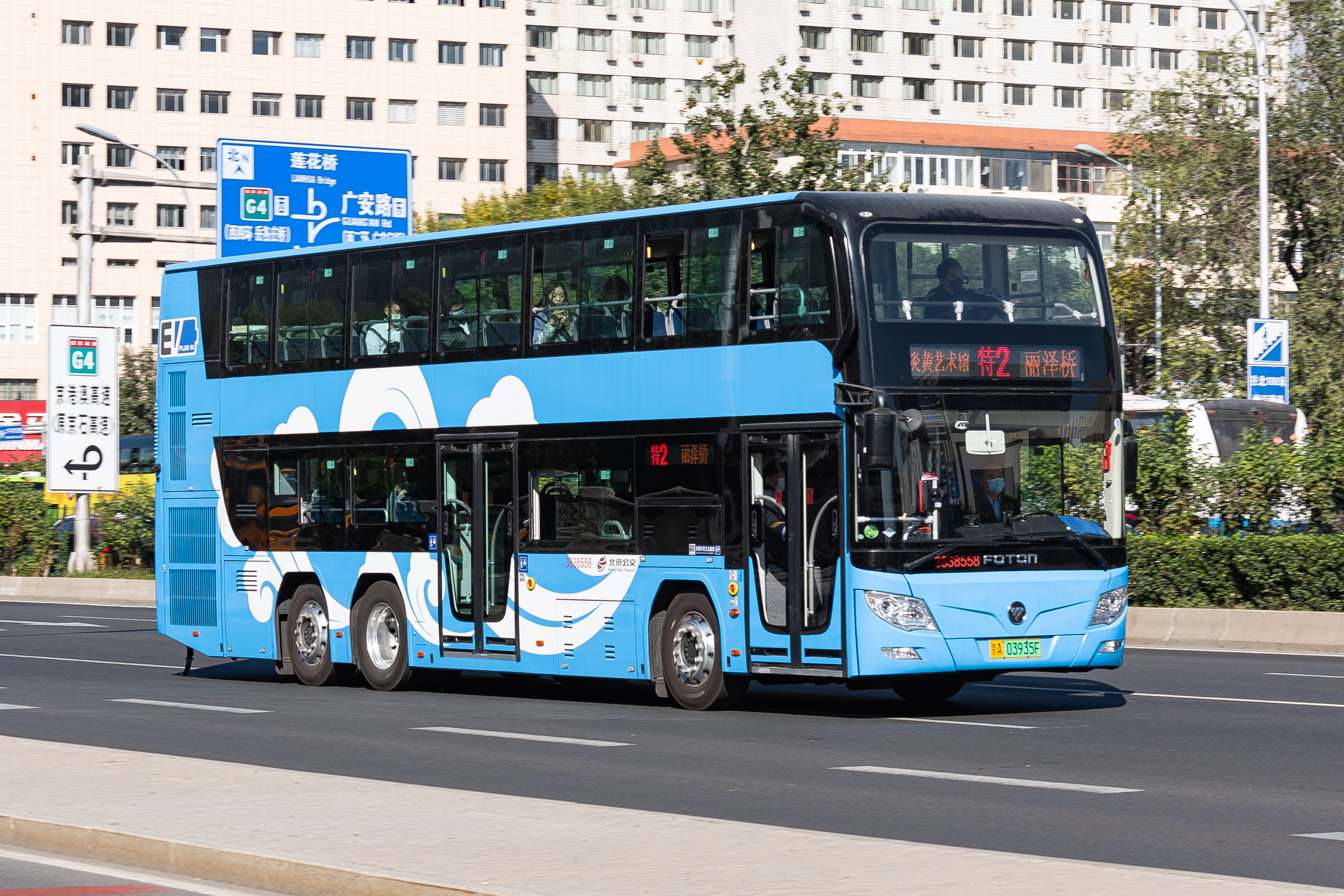
A Foton BJ6128SHEVCA-5 plug-in hybrid double-decker bus in Beijing Bus service

Several cities in continental China have double-deckers in regular use on certain crowded lines, while some have a few double-deck buses in use on lines which also use single-deck vehicles, e.g. Nanning on line No. 704 in peak hours. Guilin is leading city that operate double-deckers regularly in major routes; in its main street the double-deckers prevails and run one-by-one almost every minute. Besides Guilin and Nanning, Beijing, Shanghai, Guangzhou, Shenzhen, Tianjin, Hangzhou, Wuhan, Dalian, Foshan and Kunming also have those buses in service, particularly on routes during rush hours. Larger towns in the developed coastal provinces, including Shaoxing, Zhejiang province, use double-decker buses.

==== Hong Kong ====
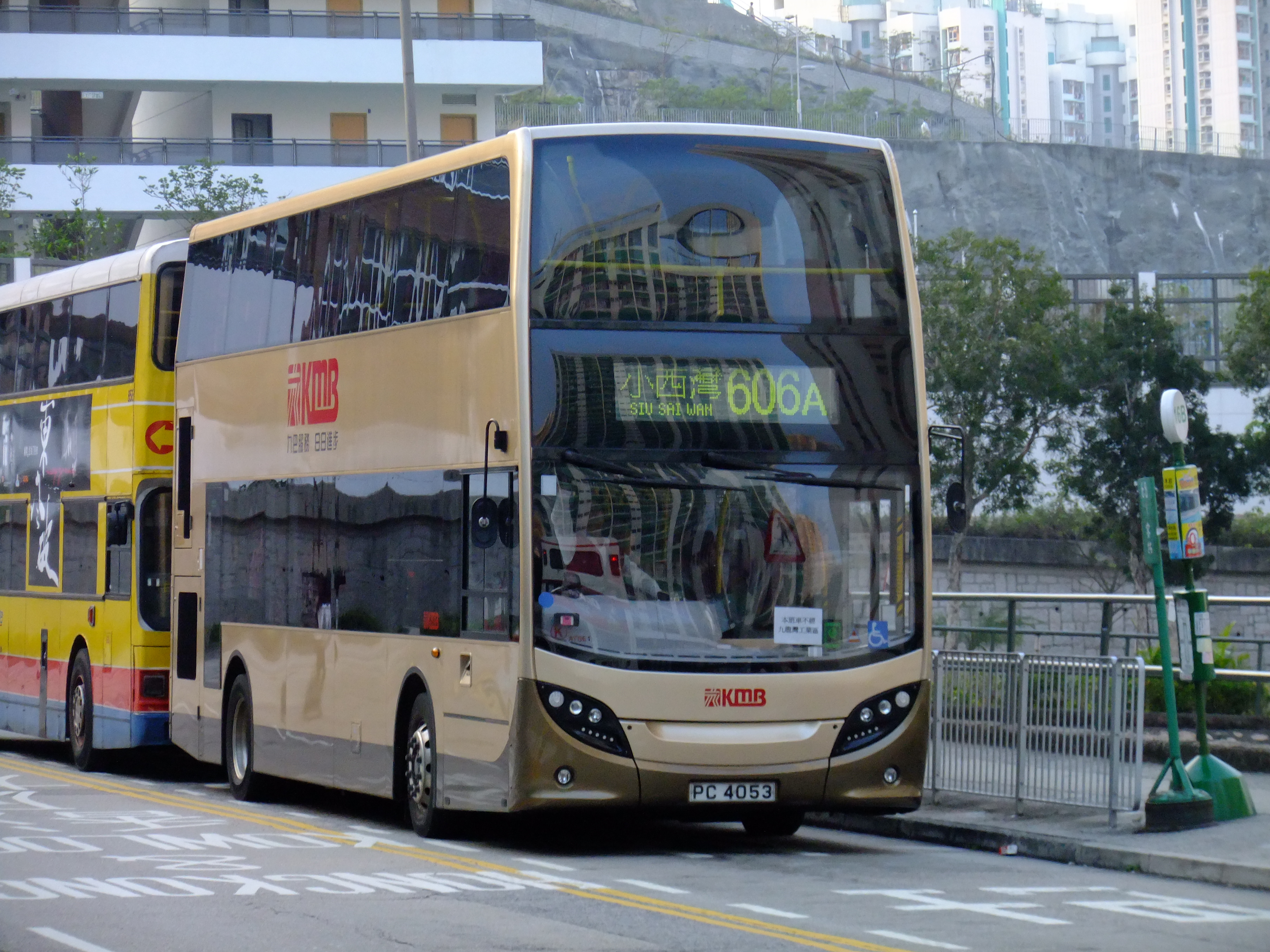
A Kowloon Motor Bus Alexander Dennis Enviro400 in Hong Kong

The former British colony of Hong Kong introduced its first double-decker buses in 1949 by Kowloon Motor Bus. They have become very popular since then, and they are found in large numbers among the fleets of the territory's major bus operators. By law, double-decker buses in Hong Kong are limited to a length of 12.8 metres (42 feet). As of 2021, the majority of buses running in Hong Kong are double-decker buses, and all of them are air-conditioned.

Kowloon Motor Bus, which is the largest bus operator in Hong Kong, operates a fleet of 3,752 double-deckers as of 2017, representing 96% of its total fleet. As of 2021, Citybus operates a total of 950 double-deckers which is also almost all of its fleet.

Hong Kong also has a double-decker tram system, the Hong Kong Tramways, one of only three in the world and the only fleet which is all double-decker.

Discovery Bay Transportation Services, operates the MAN A95 and Volvo B9TL, for routes such as Discovery Bay to Disneyland Resort station. The Volvo Olympian was previously used.

New Lantao Bus, uses a fleet of 59 double decker buses, mainly from the MAN A95 and the Alexander Dennis Enviro400.

Sun Bus uses the Wright StreetDeck on routes around Lantao Island and Ma Wan Island.

==== Macau ====
In the former Portuguese territory of Macau, Fok Lei and its successor Transmac used second-hand double-deckers widely from the early 1970s until the late 1980s.

==== Taiwan ====
In early 1990s two tri-axle Leyland Olympians were evaluated in Taipei and Taichung. The evaluation was unsuccessful and the buses were sold to Hong Kong for spares.

==== Japan ====
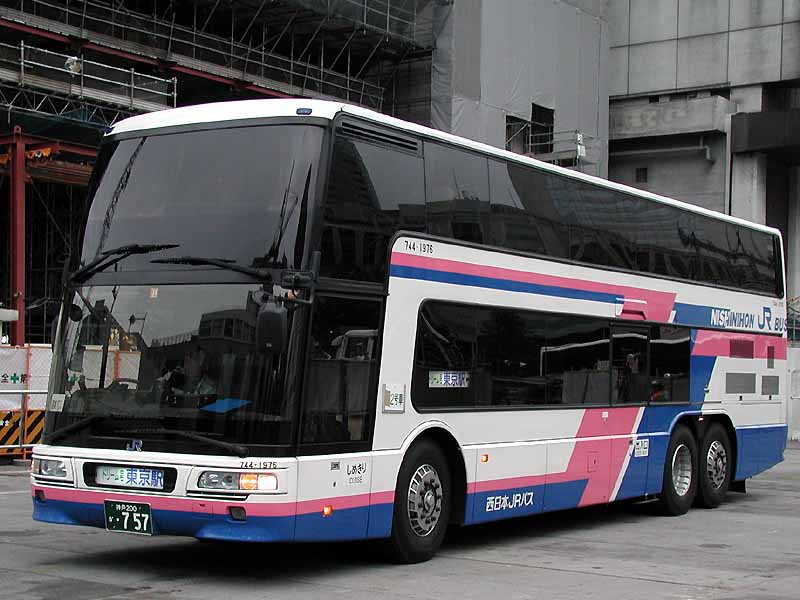
A Mitsubishi Fuso Aero King at Tokyo station as "Dream-go" in Japan

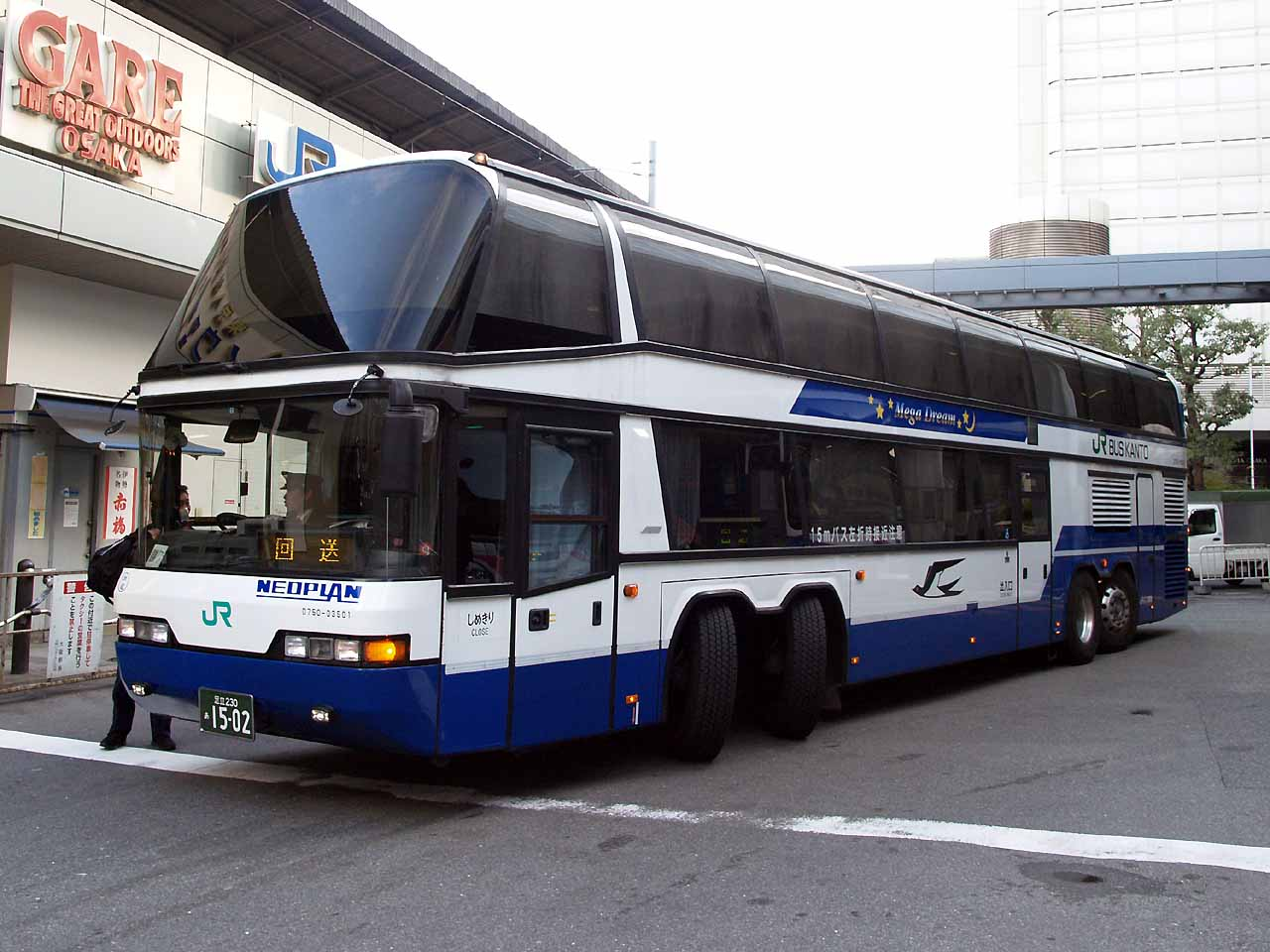
A Neoplan Megaliner at Osaka station as "Seishun Mega Dream" in Japan

By Japanese law, vehicles are confined to maximum 3.8 metres (12 ft 6 in) height and 12.0 metres (39 ft 4 in) length. Japanese double-decker buses are mainly used for inter-city highway buses (i.e., motor coaches), city tours, and charter buses. In 1960, Kinki Sharyo and Hino Motors manufactured the first original double-decker bus "Vista Coach" for Kinki Nippon Railway (Kintetsu).

In 1979, Chuo Kotsu, a chartered bus operator in Osaka, imported the Neoplan Skyliner. Skyliner, and the other imported buses: Van Hool Astromega TD824, Drögmöller E440 Meteor, and a few MAN coaches inspired Japanese bus manufactures, who developed three domestic models in the mid-1980s: "Nissan Diesel Space Dream", "Hino Grand View" and "Mitsubishi Fuso Aero King". They did not, however, sell very well as the ceiling was only 1.7 metres (5 ft 7 in) high. Nevertheless, Aero King was sold for 22 years, but, being unable to meet exhaust gas emission and safety levels, production stopped in 2005.

In 1982, Toei Bus operated Neoplan Skyliners in Tokyo, between Asakusa and Ueno to 2001. Joban Kotsu operated Skyliners in a trans-Fukushima route: between Iwaki and Aizu-Wakamatsu via Koriyama from 1983 to 1996.

Since the 1990s, JR Buses started to use Aero King for an overnight inter-city highway bus service named "Dream-go". The first Aero King in Dream-go, operated to "Fuku Fuku Tokyo" between Tokyo and Shimonoseki, Yamaguchi with Sanden Kotsu, which was replaced with a "super high-decker" coach in middle of the 1990s, "Fuku Fuku Tokyo," and finally stopped in 2006.

Japanese overnight highway buses are mainly equipped with a three-line, two-aisle (1+1+1) seat configuration with reclining seats. When this configuration is used on an ordinary coach, it has 28, 29 or 31 seats. When this configuration is used on a double-decker bus, it has 36 or 40 seats: the vehicle's price and capacity increase while operating cost decreases.

JR Bus group mainly uses Aero King, Skyliner, and a few Jonckheere Monaco (equipped with Nissan Diesel engine) for inter-city highway bus operations between Kanto (near Tokyo) and Kansai (near Osaka), which is named "Dream-go" (overnight express) and "Hiru-tokkyu" (Daytime Express). The other bus operators, inspired by "Dream-go", increased use of the Aero King for overnight inter-city bus service.

JR Bus Kanto imported four Neoplan Megaliner N128/4, leasing two to an operating partner (from 2003 to 2006, Kanto Railway, since 2006 Nishinihon JR Bus). The Megaliner is 15.0 metres (49 ft 3 in) long, and has 84 seats (with 2+2 configuration), and is operated on an inter-city highway route between Tokyo and Tsukuba, Ibaraki from 2002 to 2005. The Megaliner has also been converted for a low-price overnight highway bus service between Tokyo and Osaka called "Seishun Mega Dream-go," with special authorisation.

==== South Korea ====
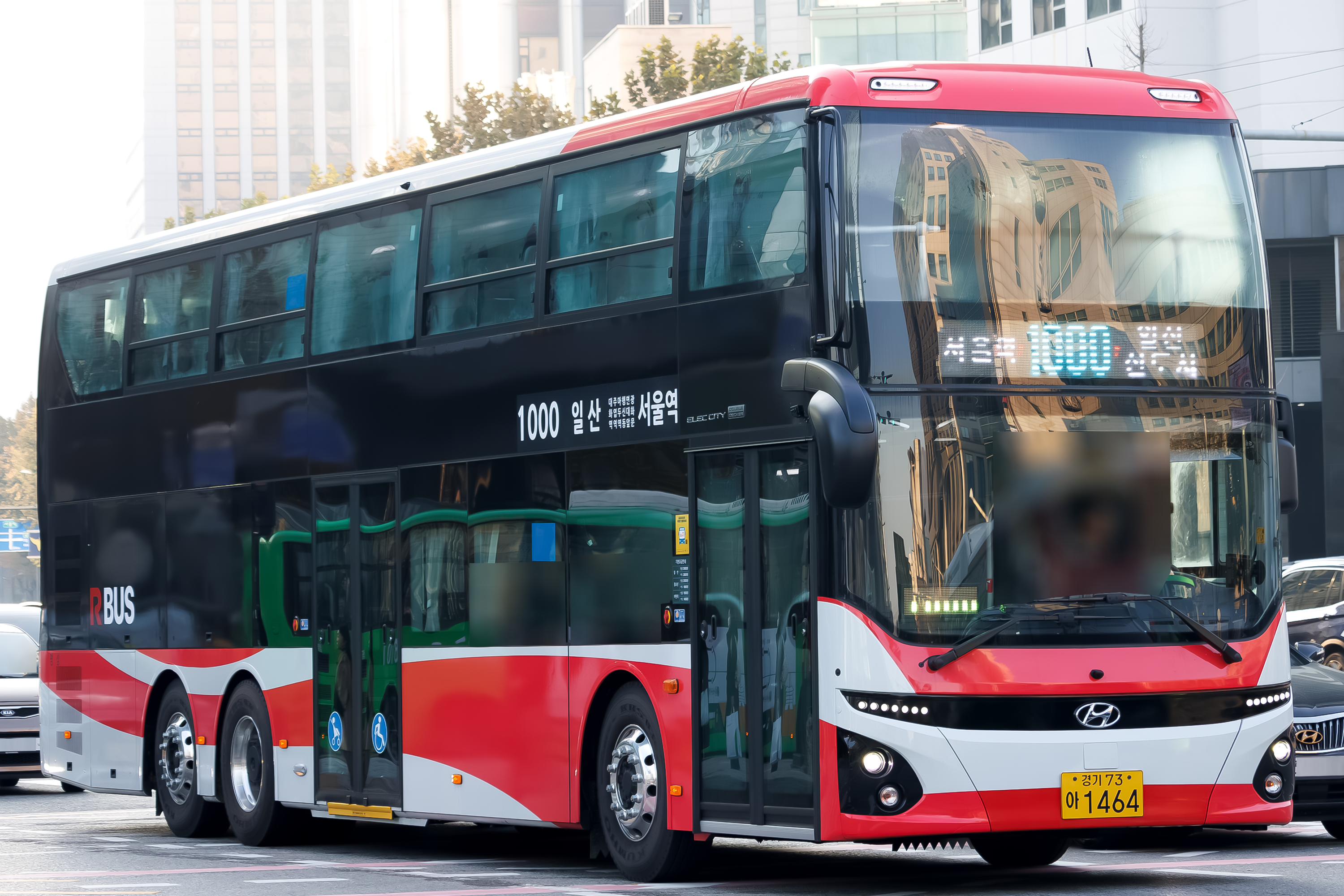
Electric bus Hyundai Elec City in Goyang

In 2015, a fleet of 20 double-decker buses was introduced for commuters making the journey between the capital Seoul and its surrounding Gyeonggi Province and nearby Incheon city in 2015 as a pilot project.

==== North Korea ====
Double deckers started running on Pyongyang streets in the latter half of 2000s.

=== South Asia ===
==== Bangladesh ====
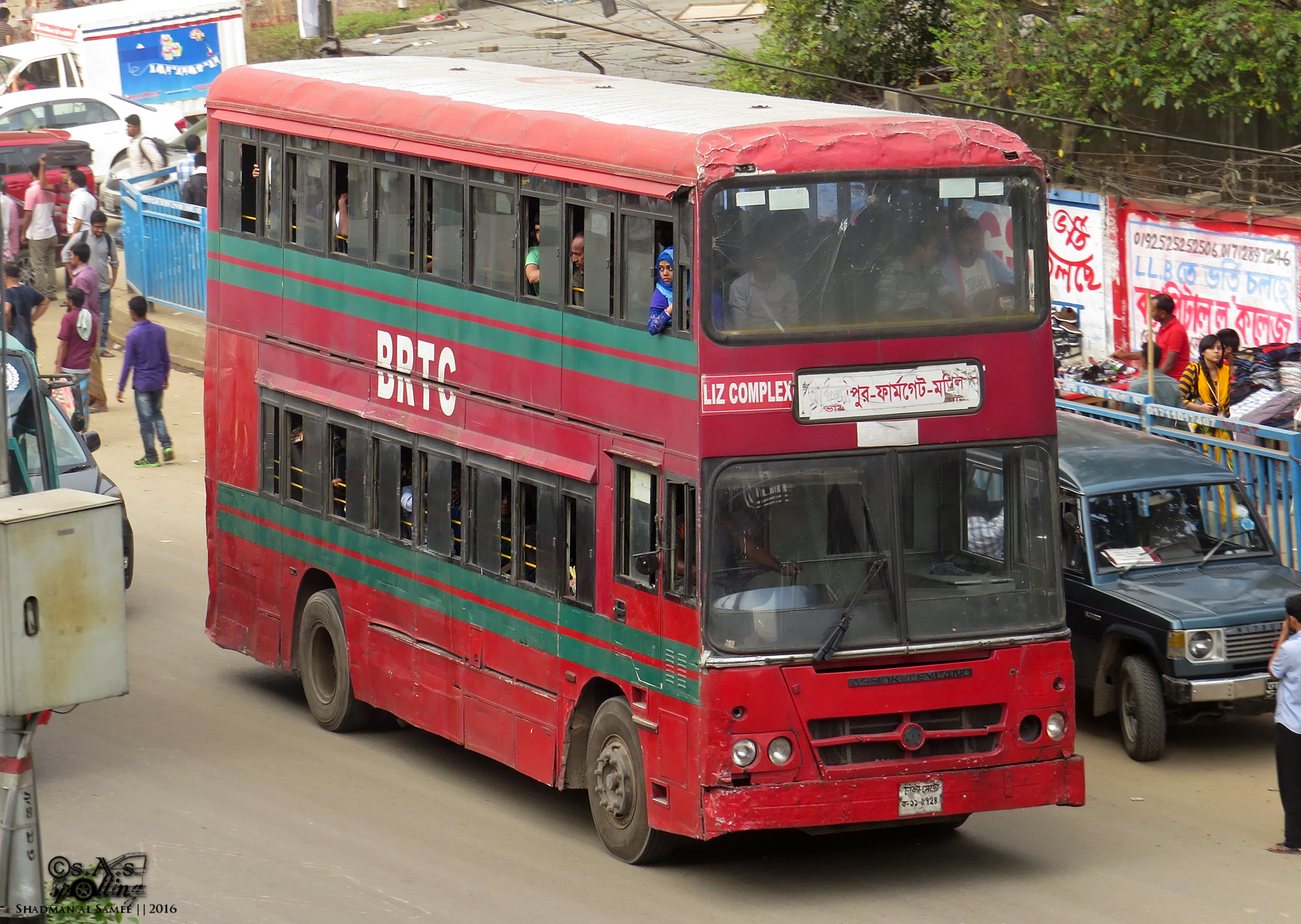
Bangladesh Road Transport Corporation Ashok Leyland

The Bangladesh Road Transport Corporation operates a fleet of Ashok Leyland buses on the streets of Dhaka and Chittagong. The majority of buses running in Dhaka are double-deckers, numbering about 445 buses as of 2022.

In 2002, 50 Volvo B10M/Alexander buses were procured to operate in Dhaka and quickly making up most of the fleet, but due to a lack of maintenance and unavailability of spare parts, they were slowly taken off the roads before being completely phased out in 2010. The BRTC has tried unsuccessfully to have them repaired and brought back to service. The company instead purchased 290 double-decker vehicles from Ashok Leyland of India as a replacement.

BRTC had about 399 double-deckers as of 2012. In 2018, the BRTC acquired 300 buses from Ashok Leyland.

In 2020, Indonesian bus manufacturer CV Laksana exported 10 luxury double decker coaches to Bangladesh. These buses were built atop a Scania chassis.

==== India ====
Modern Switch Mobility EiV 22 double-decker bus operated by KSRTC in Kerala, India

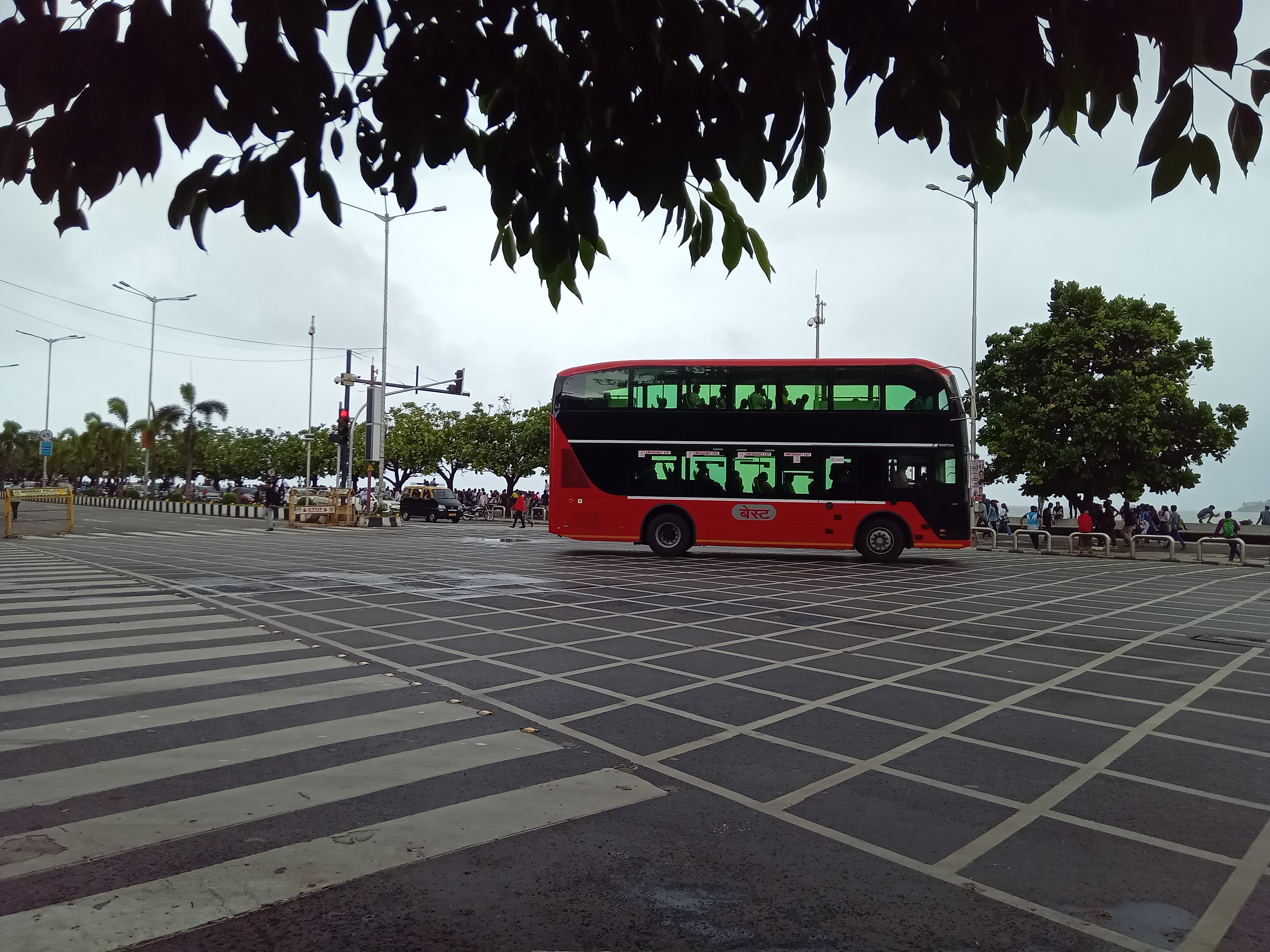
Switch Mobility EiV 22 double-decker bus travelling in Marine Drive, Mumbai

In India, cities such as Hyderabad, Bangalore, Lucknow, Delhi, and Kolkata had double deckers for a while before discontinuing them. In Delhi, double-deckers were discontinued from service around 1986. Hyderabad operated them until 2003, until it was revived for strictly touristic purposes in 2023. Chennai's Metropolitan Transport Corporation (MTC) had a small fleet of double-decker buses, mostly in the high-density, longer distance routes. They operated from 1975 before being wound up. They were briefly reintroduced in 1997 and were operated till 2008.

Mumbai has had double-decker buses since 1937, being the first Indian city to have had it during British colonial period, and it has since become an iconic symbol of the city. About 900 double-deckers were in operation in (then called) Bombay during the 1960s and these buses were modelled like London's, but the numbers went into decline in the 1990s. The Brihanmumbai Electric Supply and Transport (BEST), which operates the city's buses, phased out the legacy double deckers in 2023 in favour of modern ones.

Kerala State Road Transport Corporation is operating double deckers in Thiruvananthapuram and Kochi cities. They are modelled on the London buses. Ashok Leyland Titan double decker buses are used in all cities. Articulated double-decker buses from Ashok Leyland were used till they were phased out in the early 1990s as they were thought to be unsuitable for city traffic.

In 2020, West Bengal Transport Corporation reintroduced double decker buses in Kolkata after an absence of 30 years, on routes where wide road space was available, i.e. no over-head cables, low bridges or flyovers.

In 2022, Ashok Leyland subsidiary Switch Mobility introduced its electric double decker, the EiV22 in India. The bus was subsequently inducted into the fleets of

- BEST in Mumbai
- TSRTC in Hyderabad
- TMC in Tirupati
- Ama Bus in Bhubaneswar and Puri
- KSRTC in Thiruvananthapuram and Kochi

As of end 2023, BEST has 49 of these vehicles in its fleet in Mumbai.

==== Pakistan ====
Certain cities of Pakistan including Karachi and Peshawar had double-deckers in operation from the 1950s until the late 1970s. In Lahore these were Leyland buses operated by the Lahore Omnibus Service. In November 2015, double-deckers were reintroduced to Pakistan but only in the form of a sightseeing service for tourists, operated by Tourism Development Corporation of the Punjab (TDCP), under the name Sightseeing Lahore. The vehicles were imported from China. TDCP started a sightseeing tour in Islamabad and Rawalpindi in 2020 using the same double-decker vehicles. In Karachi, double-decker bus operations were revived by the Peoples Bus Service on the route from Malir Halt to Tower in 2026.

==== Sri Lanka ====
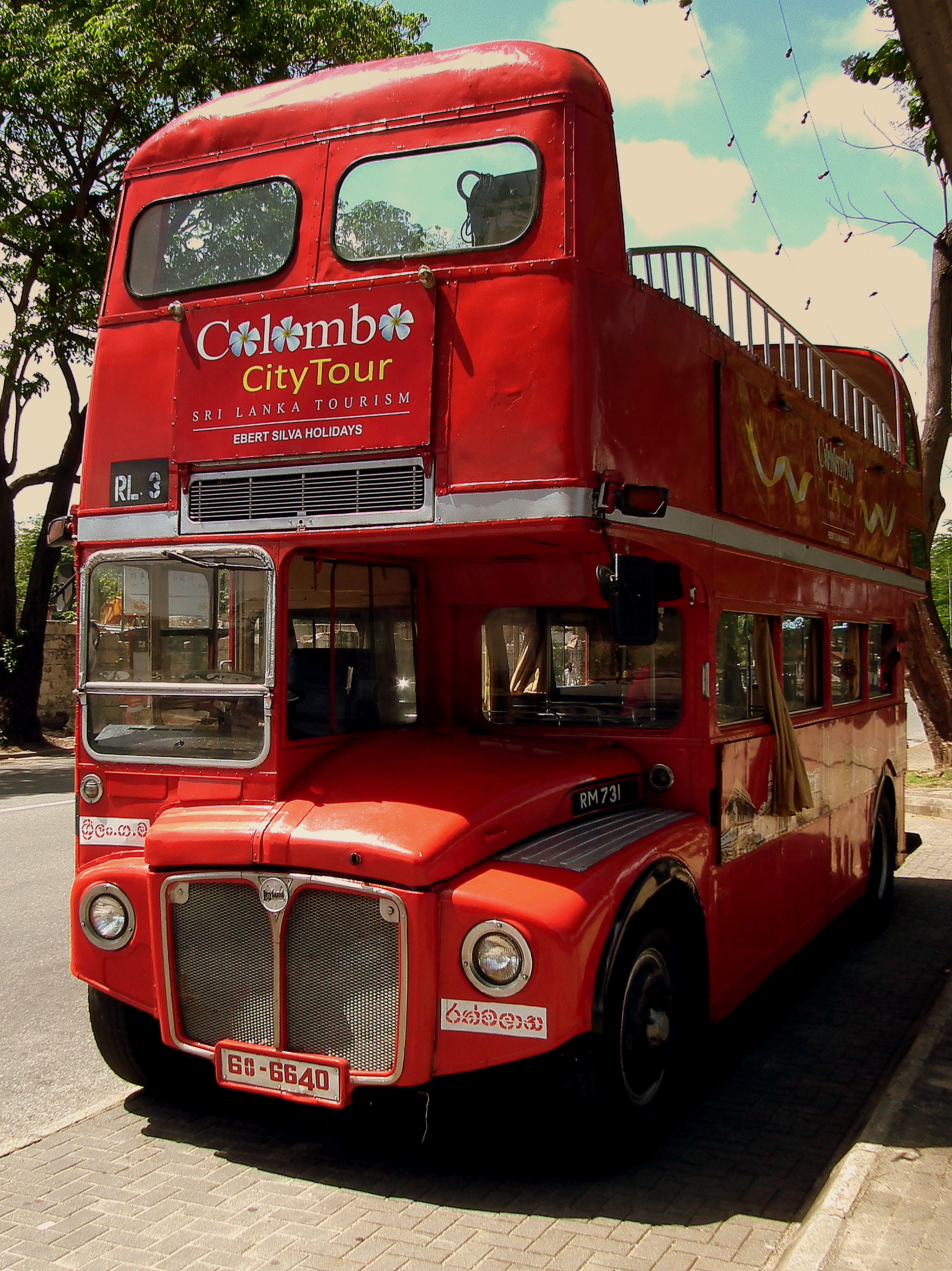
AEC Routemaster in Sri Lanka

In the 1950s, double-decker buses of the South Western Bus Company plied on the Galle Road in Colombo, Sri Lanka. These were taken over by the Ceylon Transport Board (CTB) when all bus services were nationalised in 1958. Beginning around 1959, large numbers of second-hand double-decker buses of the RT, RTL and RTW classes were imported by the CTB from London Transport, and ran in their original red livery with the oval CTB logo painted on the sides. These buses were phased out beginning in the mid-1970s, and none remain in service. Later, around 1985, 40 ex-London Routemaster entered service. One Routemaster bus is run by the Sirasa TV and radio station.

Today's buses in Sri Lanka include AEC Routemaster (Currently phased out in order to make way for Volvo B9TL/East Lancs Nordic and incoming First Western Dennis Trident 2/Plaxton President - 2001/02), MCW Metrobus (including 12m parts), Leyland Atlantean, and Dennis Trident 2 (1999/2000), plus some of the Volvo B7TL/East Lancs Vyking and Volvo B9TL/East Lancs Nordic buses.

=== Southeast Asia ===
==== Indonesia ====
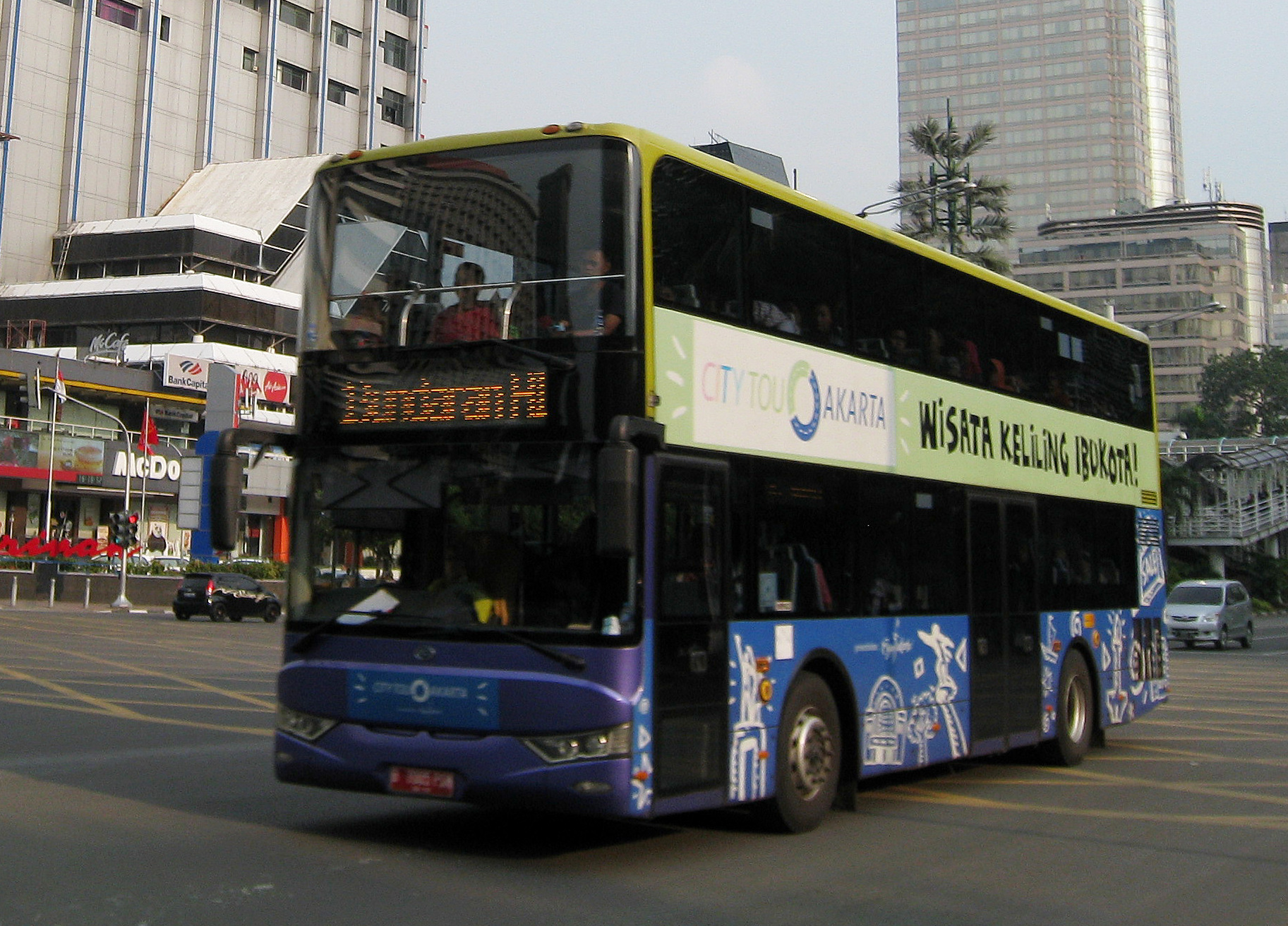
Jakarta double-decker city tour bus passing through landmarks and points of interest in Jakarta, Indonesia

Indonesia first operated its double-decker bus fleet in 1968, with Leyland Titan double-decker bus first operated in Jakarta. The double-decker bus service linked Salemba in Central Jakarta with Blok M area in South Jakarta from 1968 to 1982. Between 1984 and 1996, the Jakarta municipal bus service, Perusahaan Umum Pengangkutan Penumpang Djakarta (Perum PPD) operated a fleet of 180 Volvo B55 double-decker buses, connecting various corners in the city.

The double-decker bus service ceased to operate in 1996 due to aging fleet, lack of spare parts, and there are no plan to renew the double-decker fleet in Jakarta. By that time, the remnant of double-decker bus body were sold and repurposed as bus-themed clothing store in Blok M and restaurant in Senayan (now SCBD) area, but now the establishment has been demolished.

By the early 2000s, the PPD has shifted their bus fleet from European built double-decker buses to cheaper second-hand Japanese buses and imported articulated buses from China. By that time, the double-decker seems to be lost in favour of articulated bus, which provides more exit and entry points to accommodate faster embarkment. By 2004 the TransJakarta bus rapid transit began its service in Jakarta, but uses no double-decker bus and chosen conventional and articulated buses instead.

Since February 2014, the Jakarta Government provides free double-decker bus tours that offers sightseeing in Central Jakarta. The buses' route covers tourist attractions, such as Monas, Istiqlal Mosque, the Cathedral, National Museum, Sarinah, and Plaza Indonesia, as well as Grand Indonesia shopping centres. As 2016 there are 18 double-decker buses in Jakarta, and the service is expanded to include Kota Tua and Gelora Bung Karno Stadium in Senayan area via Sudirman avenue.

Other than the capital Jakarta, there are some cities in Indonesia that have operated double-decker buses, mostly as city sightseeing tour service. They are Bandung, Semarang and Surakarta. The Bandros is a double-decker tourist bus operating in Bandung since 2014.

After the completion of Trans-Java highway section connecting Jakarta and Surabaya in 2018, some intercity bus services began operating fleet of double decker buses. This choice was due to a larger capacity and the available seat space for a more comfortable journey across Java. Previously, the problem with operating intercity double-decker buses was the steep and narrow roads of mountainous interior on Java island. The Trans-Java highway enables a rather straight and even road terrain for smooth travel between major cities in Java.

==== Malaysia ====
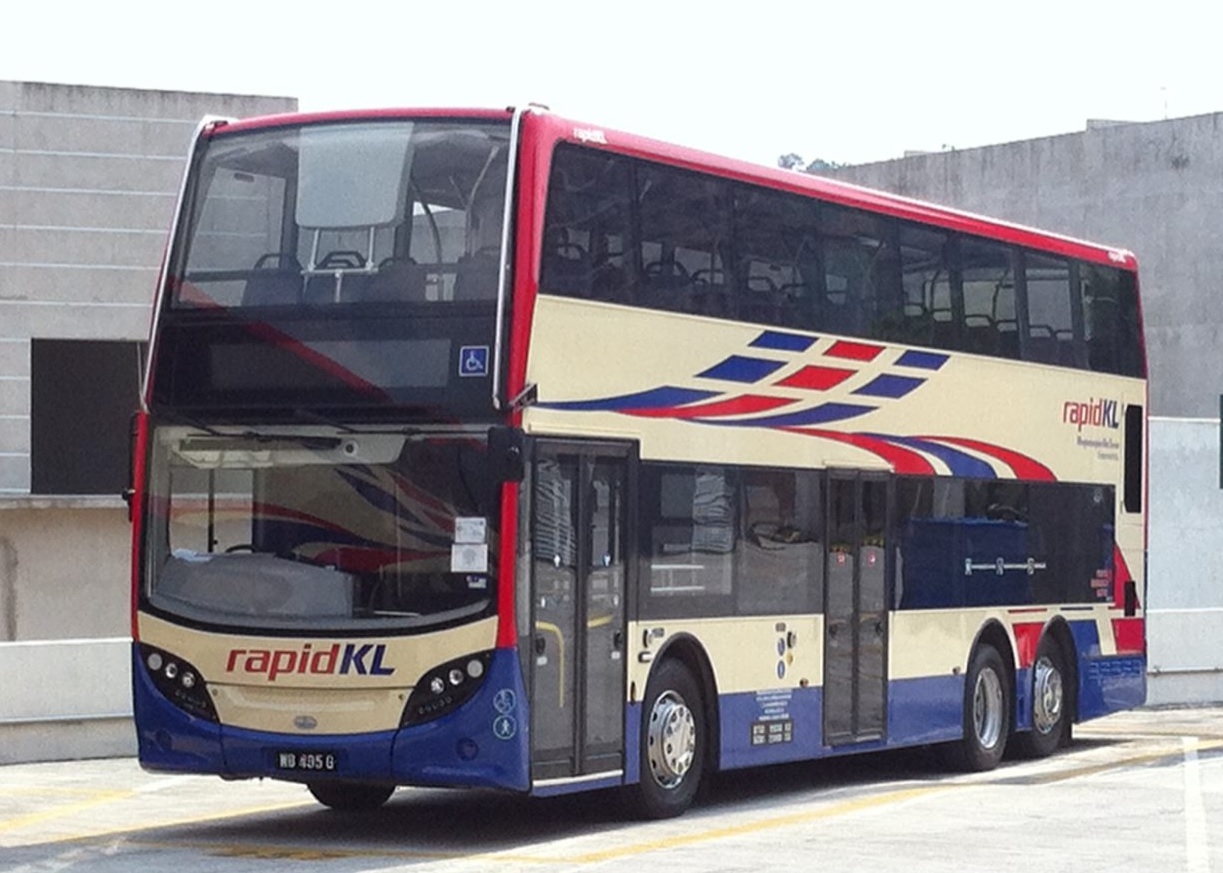
A Rapid KL Alexander Dennis Enviro500 MMC during a test run in Cheras, Malaysia

Malaysia has historically seen the use of double-decker buses in mass transit to varying degrees, but were significantly limited in use due operational costs and constrained space. Early double-decker municipal buses primarily existed in Malaya within the Kuala Lumpur area of Selangor and George Town, Penang, between the late 1940s and the early 1960s, when double-deckers were eventually withdrawn in favour of cheaper and more agile single-deck buses.

The earliest recorded use of double-deckers by Malayan bus companies was in Selangor in 1948 when the Toong Fong Omnibus Company acquired two Park Royal-built Guy Arab IIIs at a cost of M$40,000 each; the General Transport Company (GTC) followed by acquiring Park Royal-built AEC Regent IIIs. While the buses saw service for over a decade, all of them were taken out of service for a variety of reasons and were never replaced with new double-deckers; the buses were often obstructed by narrow streets, trees, low bridges, and increasing overhead wires, while passengers eventually favoured staying on the lower deck of the bus; the cost of operating the buses was also higher due to a local vehicle tax calculated based on the number of seats of a taxed vehicle. One Toong Fong double-decker was burned in the late-1950s by communist insurgents, while the remaining double-deckers were ultimately disused by the mid-1960s due to age. The successor of the GTC, Sri Jaya, experimented with a reintroduction of double-deckers in 1989 by leasing a Singapore-assembled, 102-seat Leyland Olympian for use within Kuala Lumpur for 6 months, but found that street conditions were problematic as before and discontinued the use of the bus after the trial.

In George Town, Penang, five retired AEC C1-class double-decker trolleybuses were procured in 1956 by the George Town Municipal Transport from London Transport as an experiment for the possible use of double-decker buses in George Town. Poor performance results and the advancing ages of the buses, coupled with efforts to replace the entire trolleybus fleet with single-deck diesel-powered buses in the 1960s, led to the withdrawal of the only double-deck buses in early Penangite public transport.

Following increasing public bus ridership, more open roadways and the feasibility of operating double-deck Hop-On Hop-Off tourist buses within Kuala Lumpur, Prasarana Malaysia purchased 40 (revised from an earlier 111) Alexander Dennis Enviro500 MMC double-decker buses in 2014 to serve high volume Rapid KL Rapid Bus routes; with a capacity of 108 passengers each, it is double that of a contemporary single-deck bus in the fleet. The first five buses of the batch entered service in September 2015; with the rest of the fleet gradually added into service in the following months. In November 2019, Prasarana ordered a further 90 Gemilang Coachworks–bodied Volvo B8Ls as part of Rapid KL's bus fleet replacement programme, with the first batch of buses entering service in June 2020. Feasibility studies were also conducted by Prasarana in 2015 on the reintroduction of double-deckers in Penang through Rapid Penang's bus service. By August 2016, a fleet of three Rapid Penang Enviro500 MMCs were officially launched into service, with a total of 33 buses planned. Although plans were reaffirmed in 2017 to expand the double-decker fleet by 30, delays in procurement led to the initial Enviro500 MMC fleet's quiet withdrawal from service by 2018 and transfer to the Rapid KL fleet due to operational issues; new Rapid Penang Enviro500 MMCs would reenter service in 2022.

Beyond mass transit, long-distance coach operators have widely adopted double-decker coaches since the late-2000s in response to growing demand for intercity travel, as expressways and outlying bus stops lack physical obstacles that plagued urban bus services.

==== Singapore ====
There are currently over 2,000 double-deckers in operation in Singapore.

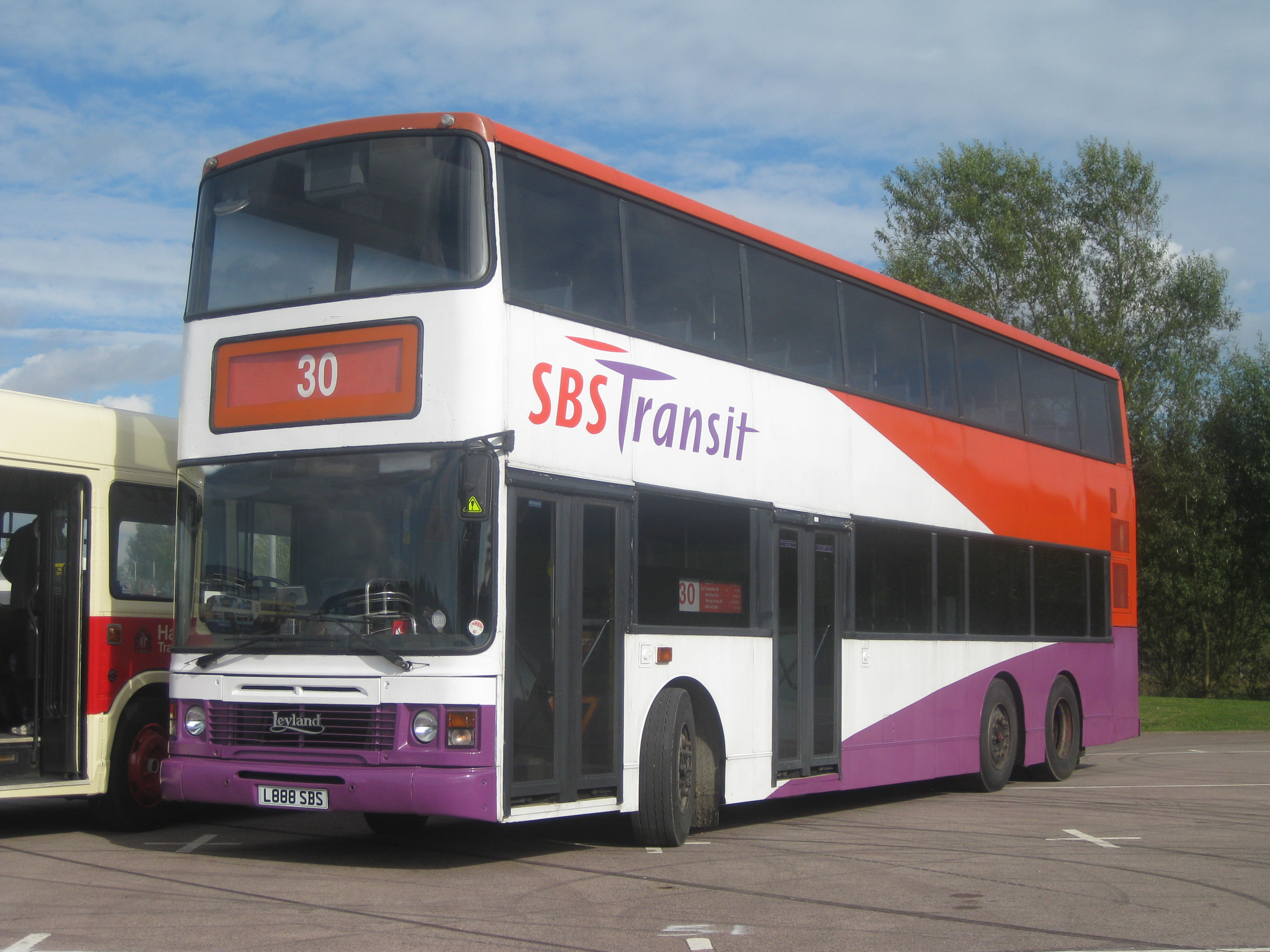
An ex-SBS Transit Leyland Olympian 3-axle bus as preserved in the UK after its retirement from Singapore in 2013

In October 1953, a single AEC Regent III double-decker from the fleet of the Kuala Lumpur–based General Transport Company was sent to Singapore for demonstration. It was used on service by the Singapore Traction Company for two weeks. After that, it was inspected by two Chinese-owned bus companies, and then sent back to Kuala Lumpur. No orders for double deckers were followed all the way until the 1970s.

Sentosa was already operating several ex-London double decker buses such as the AEC Regent III RT, Leyland Titan RTL from 1975 to the early 1980s and subsequently Leyland Olympian from Bexleybus from 1991 to 2007. They were followed by Volvo B7R Open Top double deckers from 2006 to 2015 until they were modified and converted back to single-deck. The first bus route to Sentosa, service 123 also had used double decker buses from 30 July 2017.

Normal double-decker buses were re-introduced into the Singapore's public bus system on 13 June 1977 when Singapore Bus Service (SBS, present-day SBS Transit), introduced 20 Leyland Atlantean AN68 buses on route 86 which was launched by then-Deputy Prime Minister and Minister of Communications Ong Teng Cheong that day, with the success, SBS had purchased 500 Leyland Atlantean AN68, 200 Mercedes-Benz O305 and 200 Leyland Olympian double decker buses until 1986 with the Alexander R-type body, while also trialing several demonstrators such as the Volvo B55, Dennis Dominator, Scania BR112DH and Volvo B10MD Citybus concurrently. The next batch of double-deck buses was introduced from 1984 to 1986 and consists of the Mercedes-Benz O305 and the Leyland Olympian, both of which were bodied by Walter Alexander Coachbuilders with an R-type body.

In 1993, the first air-conditioned 12-metre or 39-foot (as opposed to the average 10.5-metre or 34-foot length then) double-decker bus, the Leyland Olympian 3-axle was launched as the "Superbus". The original 200 "Superbuses" were followed by an additional 471 Volvo Olympian 3-axle "Superbuses" and 100 non air-conditioned Volvo Olympian buses from 1994 to 2000. The Volvo B10TL Super Olympian, the first stepless, ultra-low-floor "Superbus", was launched in 1999 while 20 low-floor Dennis Trident 3 buses followed in 2001. The first wheelchair-accessible double-decker buses, the Volvo B9TL, were introduced in 2006; SBS Transit's monopoly on double-decker buses in Singapore ended in 2014 when rival SMRT Buses ordered 201 Alexander Dennis Enviro500 Mark III buses and were succeeded by 15 more buses. These Enviro500 buses where similar to those delivered to Hong Kong. It was followed up with 16 MAN ND323F A95 buses in 2015, and as of 2023, 542 double deckers are in service. Those are being ordered by LTA, and newer units introduced from 2018 onwards are also Euro 6–compliant and are equipped with USB charging ports and Passenger Information Display System (PIDS).

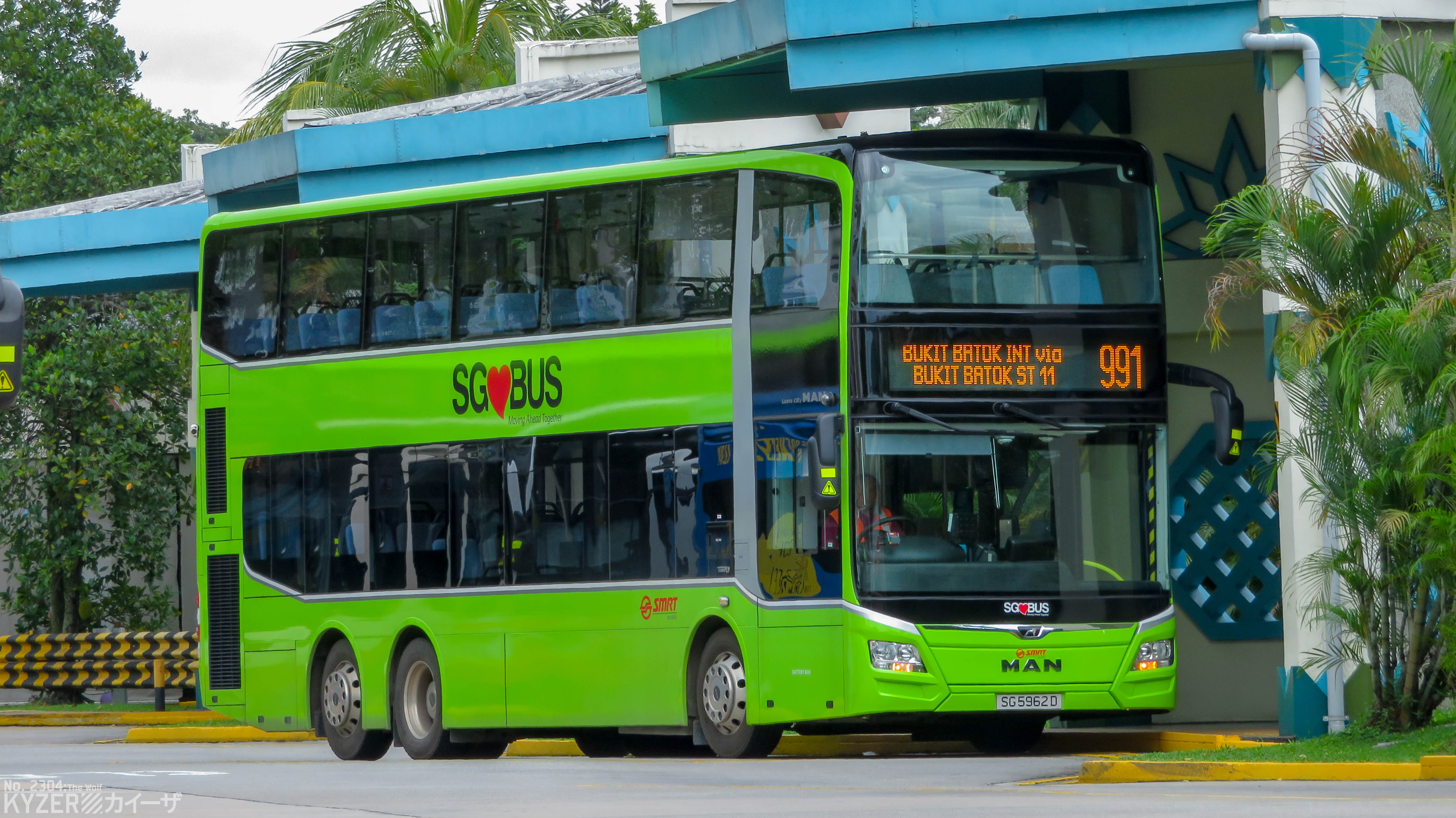
The MAN A95 is one of the newest double-decker buses purchased for the Bus Contracting Model.

Some of the existing double-deckers owned by SMRT Buses and SBS Transit were transferred to new operators Tower Transit and Go-Ahead under the Bus Contracting Model. Subsequent orders of Volvo B9TL and MAN A95 buses are being made by the Land Transport Authority, are painted in a lush green livery (rather than the operator-specific liveries of SMRT and SBS Transit), and are used by all operators. Double-decker units are prohibited on certain services due to height restrictions, narrow roads and width restrictions.

In March 2017, the first three-door, two-staircase 12.8 metre-long double-decker bus in Singapore was introduced by Tower Transit with the registration plate SG5999Z for a six-month trial period.

==== Philippines ====
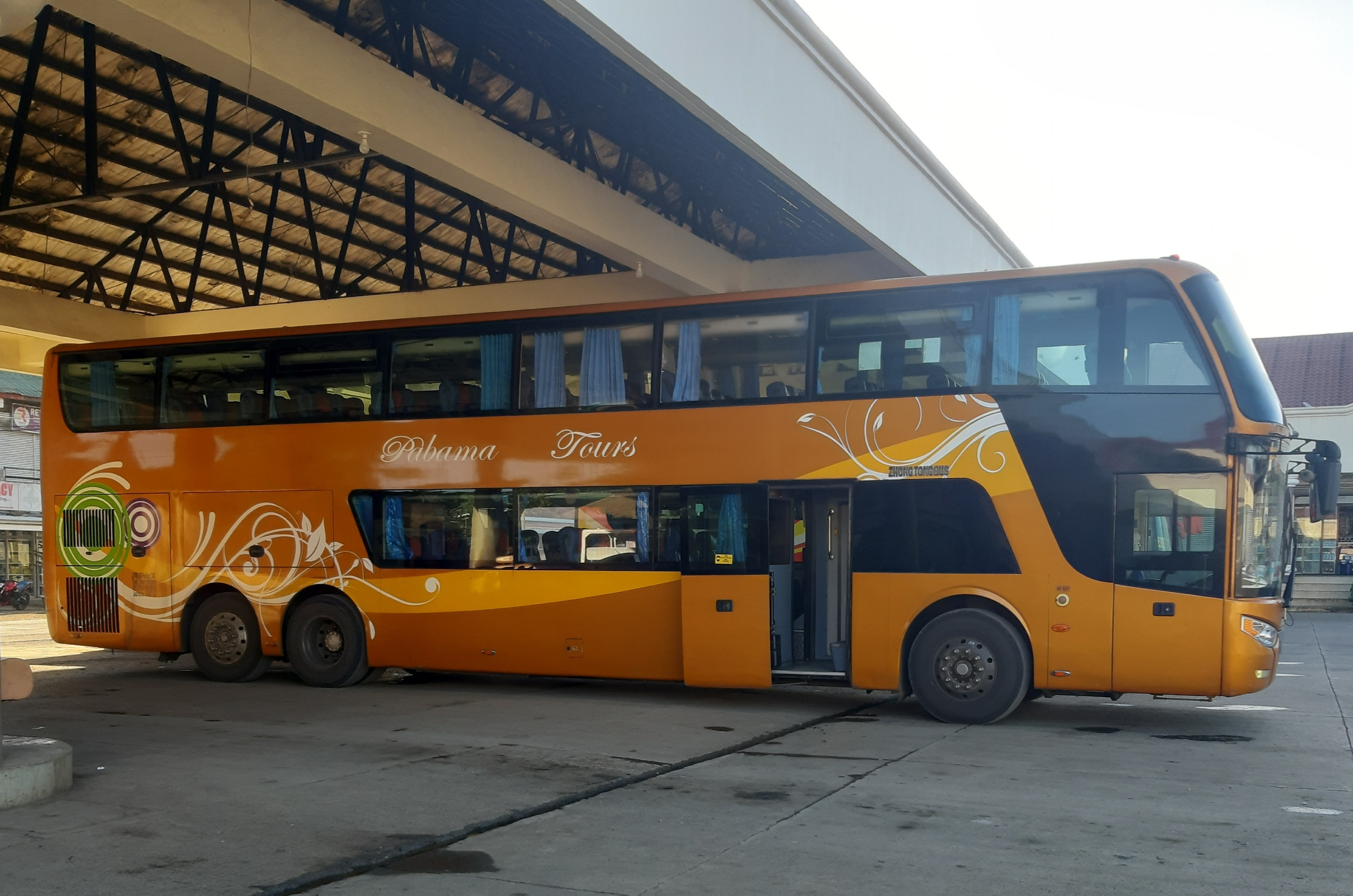
A double-decker bus of Pabama Transport in Bukidnon

Presently double-decker buses are used by the Mall of Asia Arena (Higer KLQ6119GSE3 B91H-series) and the Subic Bay Metropolitan Authority (King Long XMQ6110GS). Former operators were Manila Motor Company (Matorco), which introduced such buses to the Philippines, and the Metro Manila Transit Corporation (Leyland Atlantean). The first double-decker bus in decades to serve the riding public in the capital region debuted in January 2016, serving the SM City North EDSA-Ayala Center route. It also sports PWD and elderly sitting, a national first. Those were technically the Premium Point To Point buses

In the entirety of Visayas and Mindanao region, Pabama Transport based in Bukidnon province in northern Mindanao was the first bus line to deploy double decker buses (Zhongtong LCK6148H Navigator) which started servicing the riding public in June 2018. It was also the first in the country to field double-decker buses for provincial operations.

==== Thailand ====
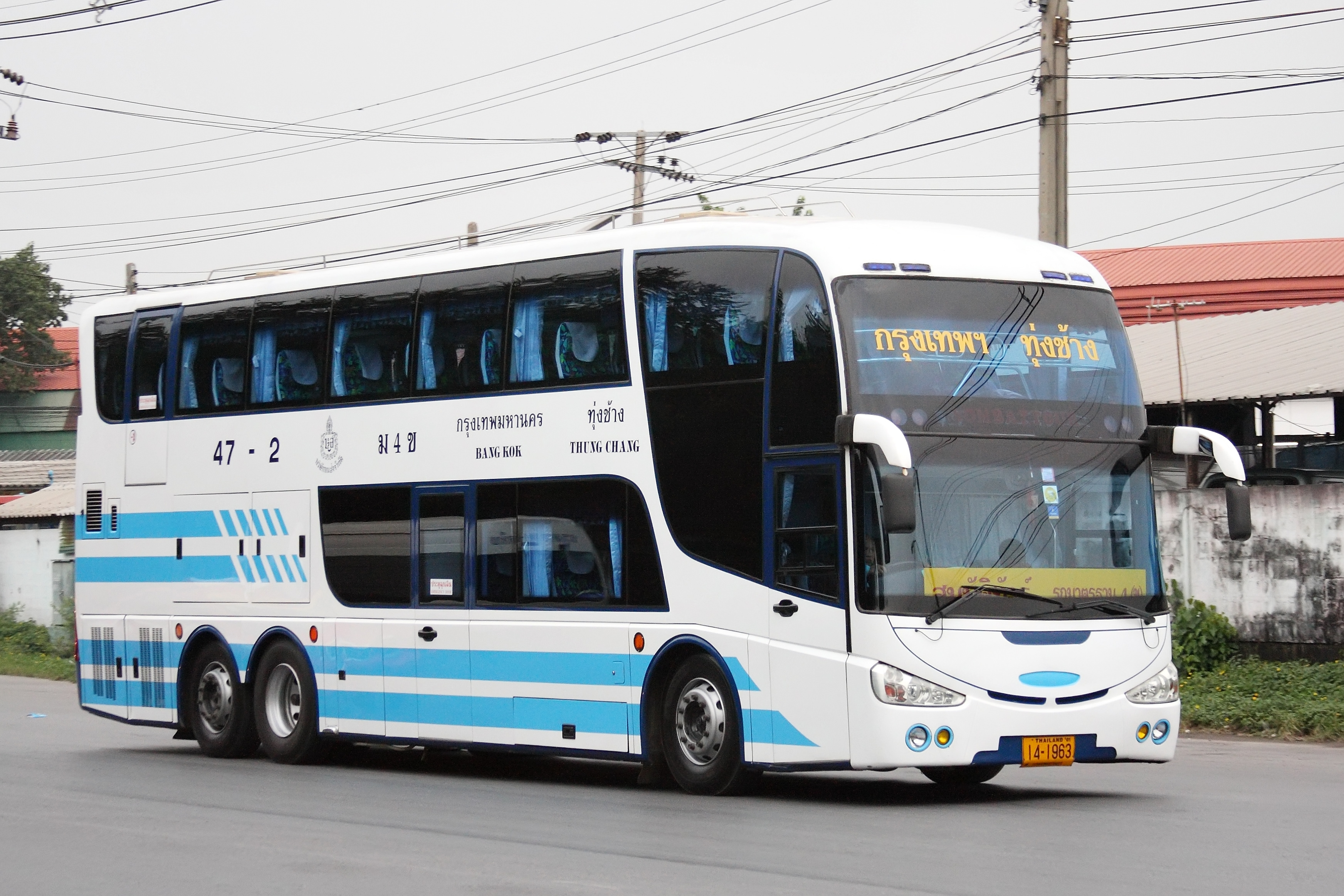
Bangkok double-decker bus

Double deckers are also commonly found in Thailand nowadays. Previously there are Volvo B10M with Alexander bodies available.

==== Vietnam ====
The first two double decker buses were used for route 06 of Ho Chi Minh City since 3 December 2005 in green color, like many HCMC buses at that time. There were rumors in May 2019 that these two buses will cease their operation, but Head of HCMC Department of Transportation confirmed that the buses will remain in service.

=== West Asia ===
==== Iraq ====
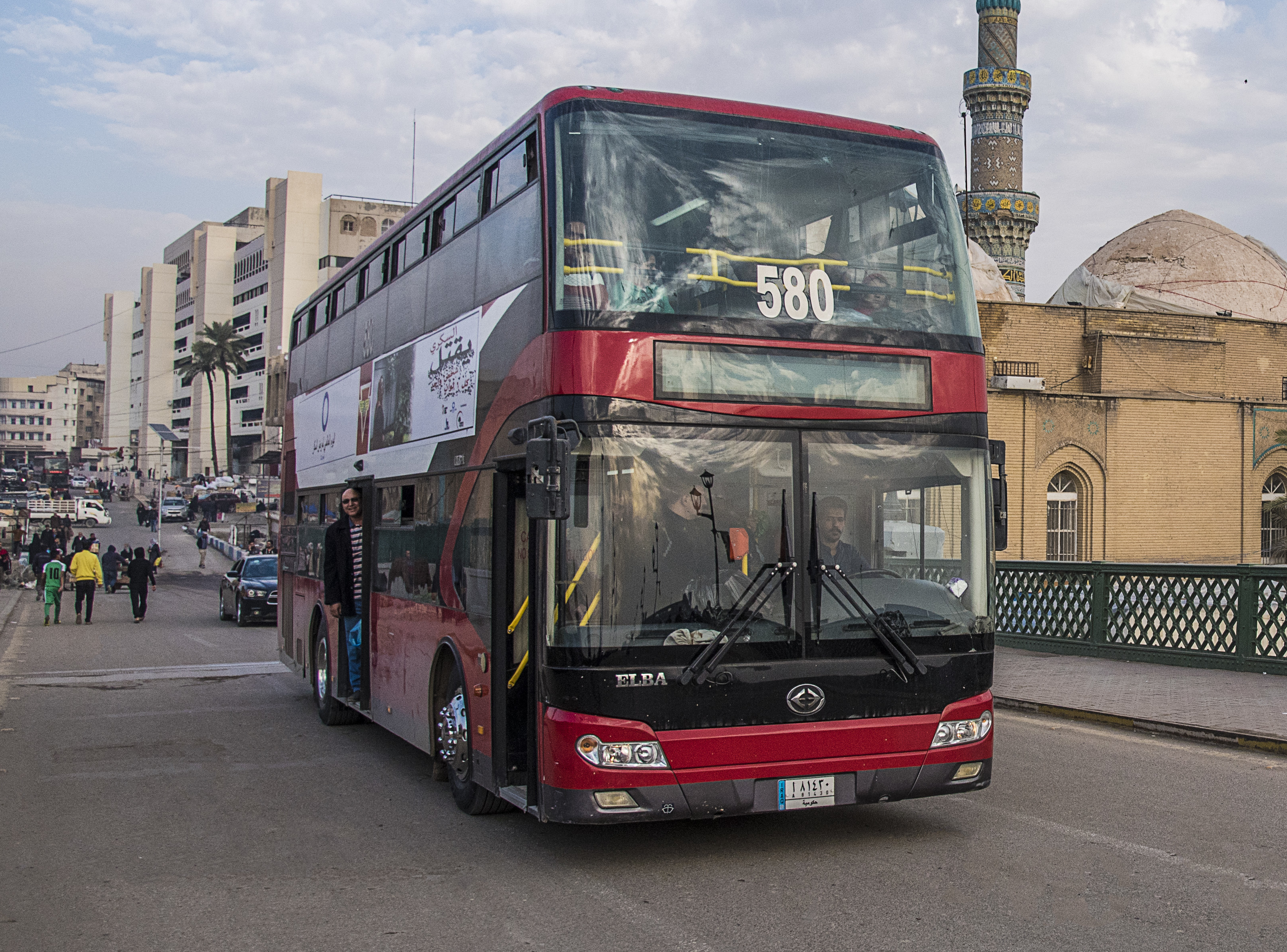
Double-decker bus in Baghdad, Iraq, in 2016

First used in 1938 and continued until 2003. They became an icon of the city of Baghdad, and were brought back in 2012 with modern buses. A fare cannot reach more than 45 US cents or 500 Iraqi Dinars. The double-decker buses in Baghdad were the first to enter the Middle East and the Arab world.

==== Iran ====
The first double-decker bus in Iran was assembled in 1959. One of the most popular double-decker buses in Iran was Leyland Atlantean. There are other examples, tourist double-decker buses being one, in metropolitan cities such as Tehran, Mashhad, Tabriz, the Island of Kish, and more.

==== Israel ====
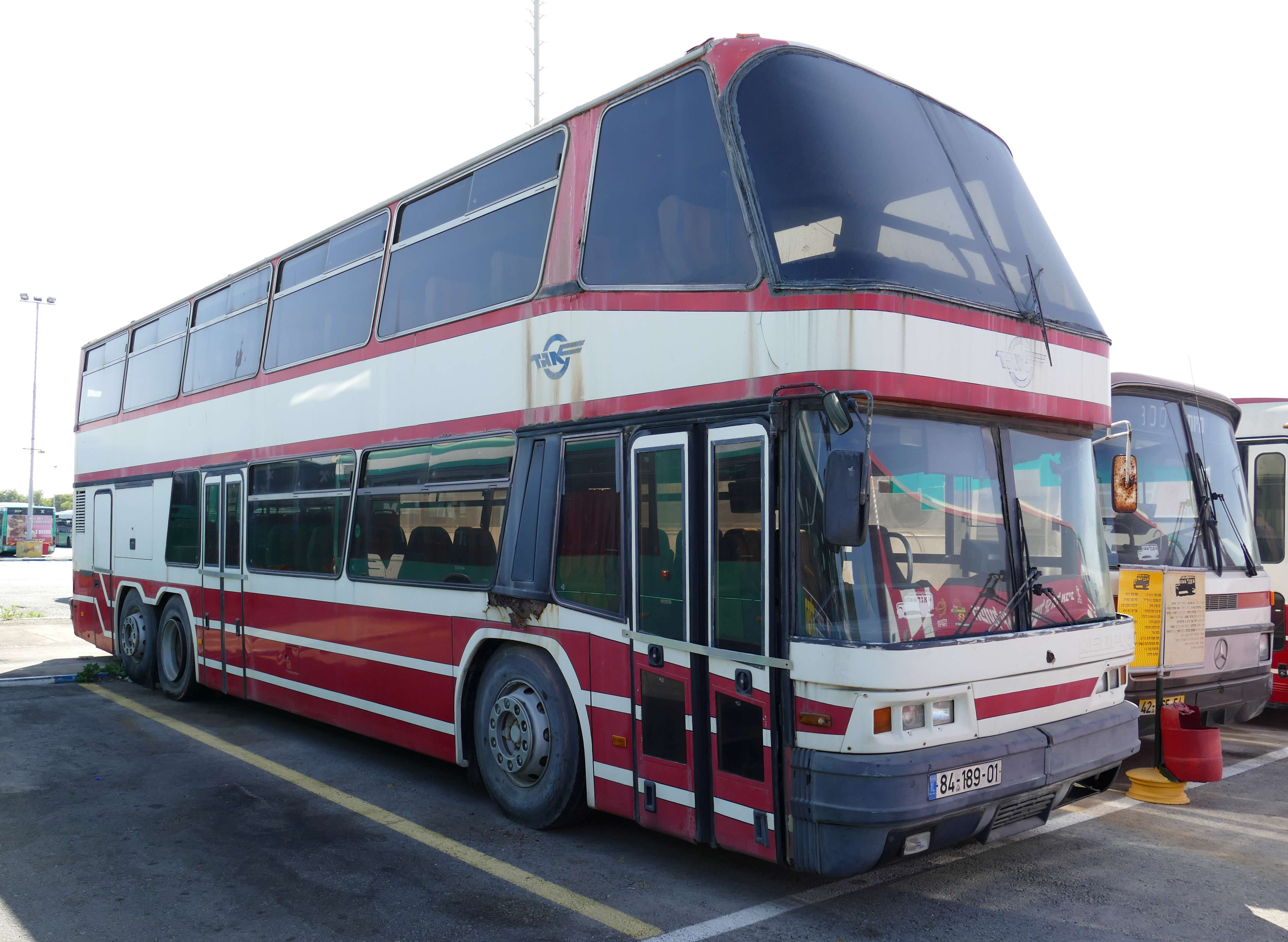
Egged Neoplan N122 Skyliner

In Israel, Egged operated double-decker buses from 1984 to 2013.

First double-decker (built by Neoplan) arrived to Israel on 26 August 1984, and during the trial period it performed 434 test drives on four different lines, passed 195583 kilometers and gathered public attention and interest. Double-deckers were found commercially attractive, and in 1988 an agreement between Egged and Neoplan was signed, ordering first 20 buses, with additional 30 buses ordered in the following year. The double-deckers started to arrive in 1989, and they worked on lines Tel-Aviv—Jerusalem, Tel-Aviv—Haifa, Tel-Aviv—Be'er Sheba and on Eilat lines.

However, both technical issues (in connection between the engine and the transmission) and religious issues (Haredi Jews had issues with women sitting above and in front of them) led to gradual decline in use of these double-deckers. They were removed from the last major line operating them, the Tel-Aviv—Jerusalem line (480), in the end of the 1990s, worked for some time on local lines in the Shfela region, and in the beginning of 2000s were finally removed from service. Some of the buses were sold to an auto dealer from Jordan, who in turn sold them to Iraq and other countries of the Persian gulf.

In August 2005, three double-deckers returned to service on line 99 "Scenic route" in Jerusalem. These 3 buses were assembled from parts of 7 double-deckers that were still in storage. The operational cost for double-deckers gradually grew beyond the limit when repairs were still attractive, which led to their final removal from service in 2013.

In June 2021, Egged began operating a double-decker bus on route 190 between Rishon Lezion and Tel Aviv. The bus is based on a Mann chassis and a chassis from the Spanish UNVI company, can transport about 90 passengers (73 seated) and is also accessible with a ramp for the disabled. Egged purchased 4 buses of this model.

==== Kuwait ====
In the 1980s, KPTC took a number of Leyland Atlantean's. Since Deregulation one of the other main bus operators Kuwait Citybus re-introduced 56 double deckers built by King Long in 2017.

==== United Arab Emirates ====
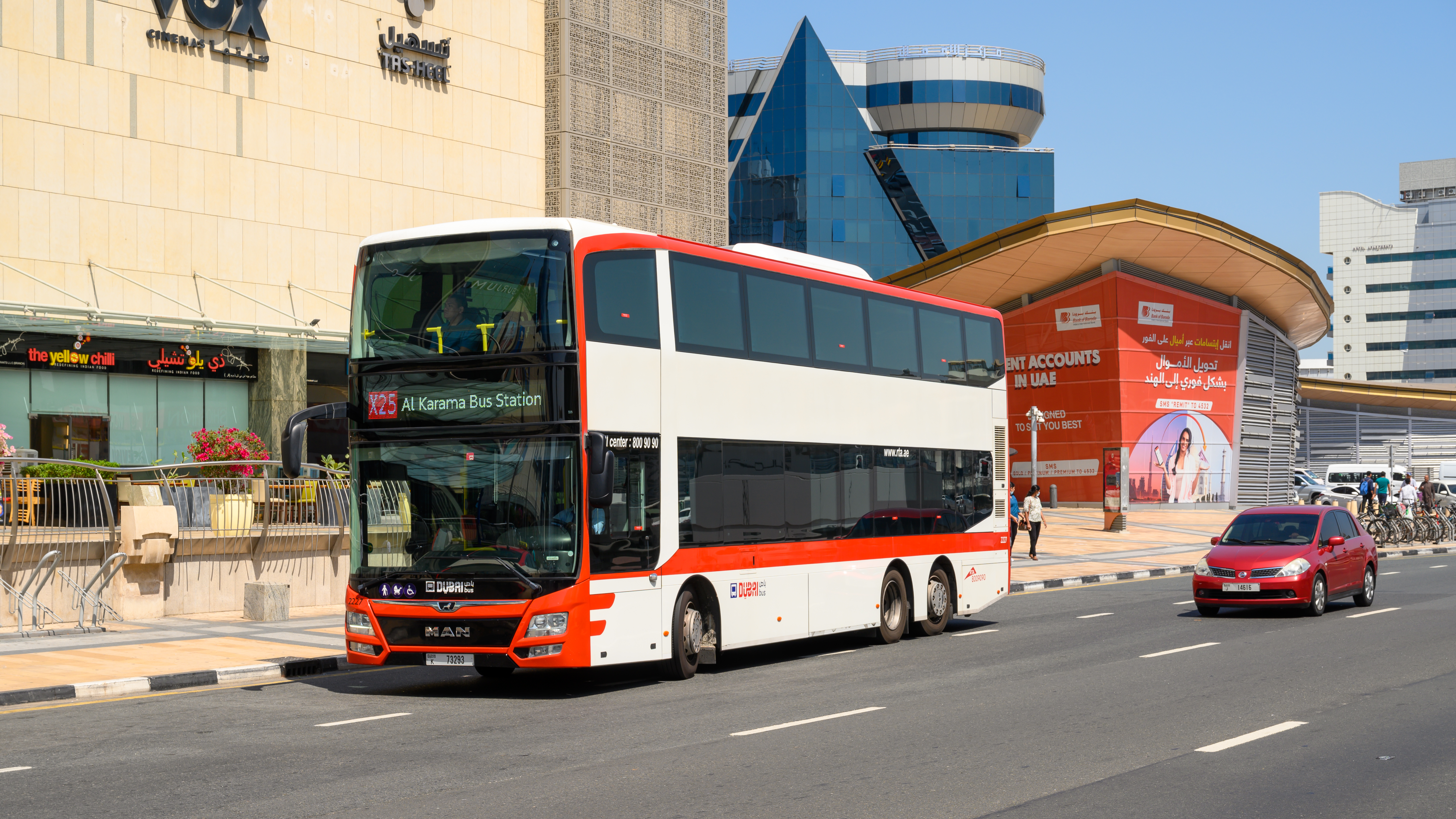
MAN A95 double decker on route X25 running in Dubai, UAE, in 2023

170 Neoplan double deckers are in operation in Dubai.

=== North America ===
==== Canada ====
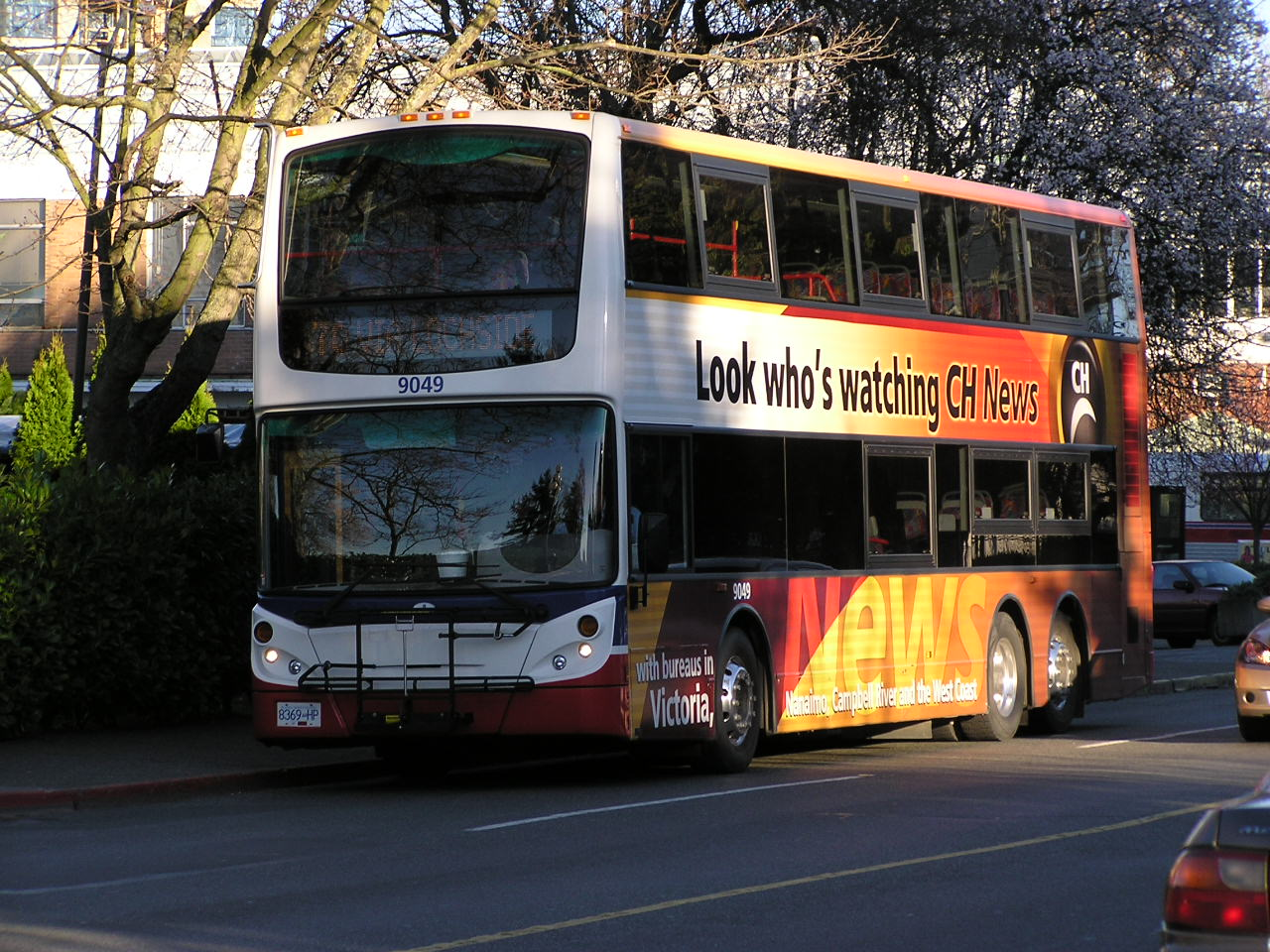
An Alexander Dennis Enviro500 equipped with bike rack, servicing Victoria, British Columbia, Canada

In 2000, the cities of Victoria and Kelowna, British Columbia, placed an order for 10 Dennis Trident 3 buses imported from the United Kingdom, becoming the first cities in North America to use modern double-decker buses in their public transit systems. Several more orders have been placed since then, and as of 2017 BC Transit operates 69 double-decker buses, including Trident 3s and the newer Alexander Dennis Enviro500s, of which 62 operate on the Victoria Regional Transit System and the remaining 7 with the Kelowna Regional Transit System. In Victoria, the buses are mainly used on routes that go from downtown to the suburbs, and to the Swartz Bay Ferry Terminal near Sidney, British Columbia. They can also be found on routes that head to the University of Victoria and the Western Communities, and have proven to be very popular amongst both locals and tourists.

TransLink, the transit authority of Metro Vancouver, British Columbia, tested 2 Enviro500 buses on lines 301, 311, 351, 354, 555, 601 and 620 between November 2017 and March 2018. It was announced soon after that 32 double-deckers will be purchased, arriving in 2019. On 30 October 2019, TransLink's first double-decker bus made its first ever run along route 620 from the Bridgeport station in Richmond to the Tsawwassen Ferry Terminal.

From March 2009 to June 2012, three imported Alexander Dennis Enviro500 double-decker buses similar to those in Victoria were used on OC Transpo express routes on the Transitway in Ottawa, Ontario. Delivered in November 2008, these buses proved to be efficient in reducing costs, but their height prohibited their use on many routes. Consequently, these three buses were withdrawn and sold to Victoria in late 2012 after a new series of 75 Enviro500 buses with a lower height that met MTO regulations entered service earlier that year. As of 2018 OC Transpo has 133 of these buses.

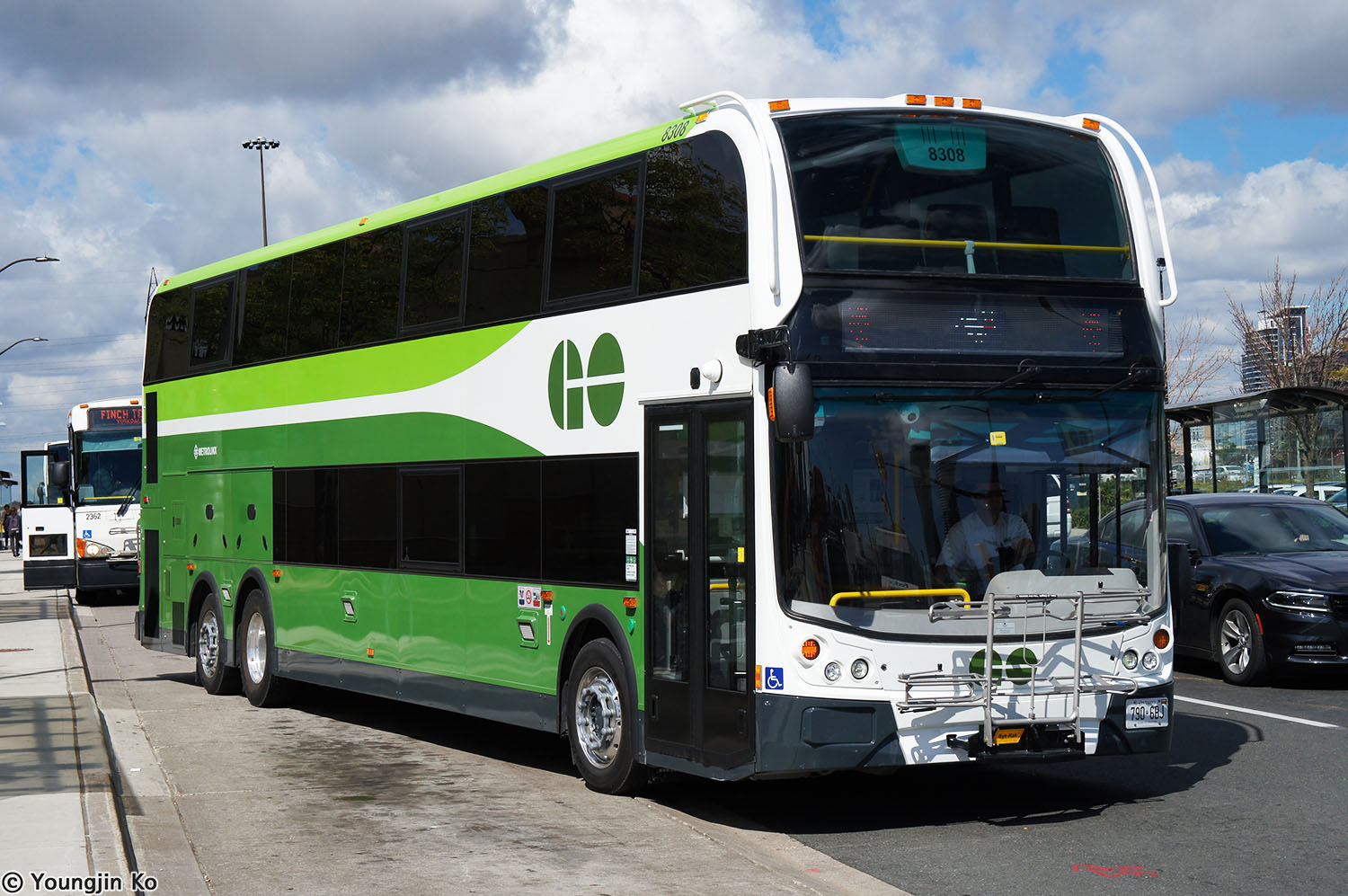
One of GO Transit's 3.9-metre height (12 ft 9 1/2 in) Super-Lo double-decker buses

GO Transit, a regional transit system serving the Greater Toronto Area in Ontario is the largest user of double-decker buses in Canada, with over 150 such vehicles in service as of 2017. Its fleet comprises Alexander Dennis Enviro500s in a single-door, commuter-type configuration similar to its fleet of highway coaches. The first 22 entered service between 2008 and 2009, with its 4.3-metre (14 ft 1 1/4 in) roof height limiting usage to the Highway 407 corridor. 105 additional buses were delivered between 2012 and 2015 and feature a lower roof height of 4.1 metres (13 ft 5 3/8 in). The latest series of 253 buses, which is currently built in a local factory in Vaughan, has a roof height of 3.9 metres (12 ft 9 1/2 in) and is expected to replace most of the single-decker coach fleet by 2020, at which point 75% of the active fleet is expected to be composed of double-deckers.

Strathcona County Transit of Strathcona County, Alberta, started a pilot project in September 2010 which explored using different high-capacity bus types to carry more passengers on high-demand commuter routes between Strathcona County and Edmonton. This involved a one-year lease of an Alexander Dennis Enviro500 from the manufacturer. After completing a year of testing between September 2010 and October 2011, a firm order of 14 Enviro500s was placed in 2013 for their service between Sherwood Park and downtown Edmonton, with the first arriving in late August. Five more buses were ordered in 2016, bringing the fleet of double-deckers to 19 as of 2017. Strathcona County Transit currently has 24 Enviro500s in their fleet.

==== Mexico ====
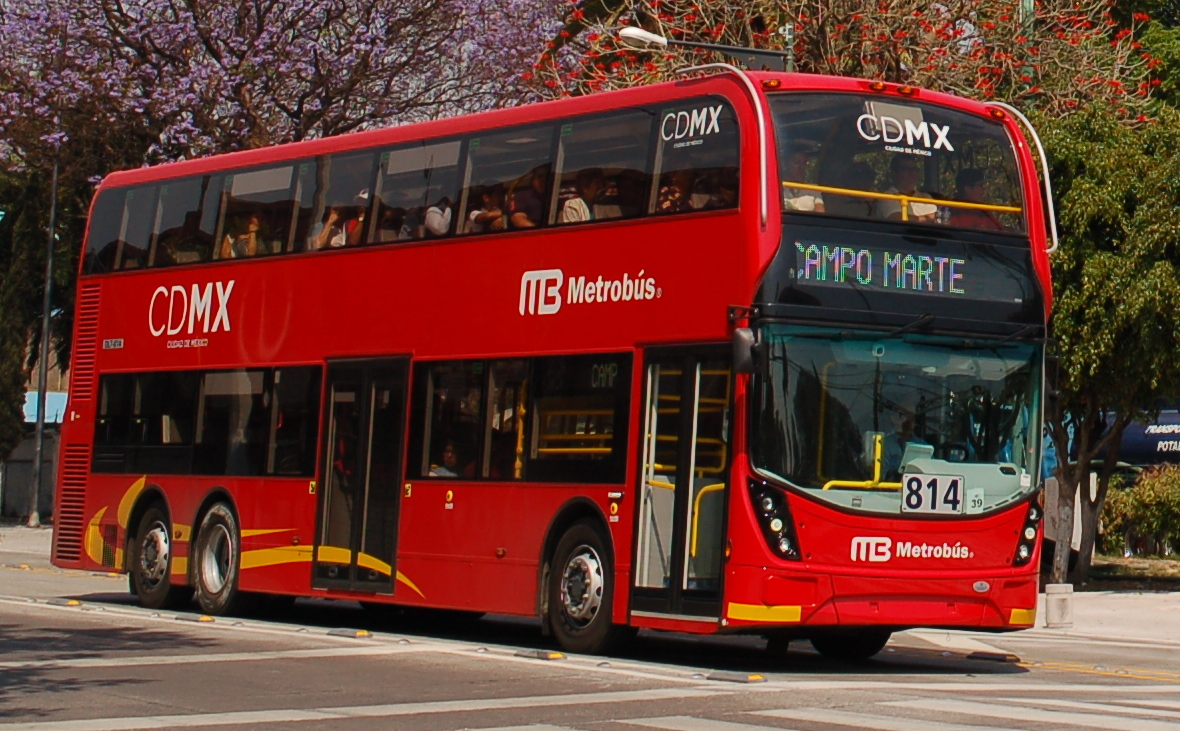
Alexander Dennis Enviro500 MMC double-decker bus on Mexico City Metrobús' new line 7 running along Calzada de los Misterios

The Mexico City Metrobús bus rapid transit system started operating a fleet of 90 Alexander Dennis Enviro500s on its new line 7, along the city's boulevard, Paseo de la Reforma, in February 2018.

==== Panama ====
Panama possesses at least one double-decker bus.

==== United States ====
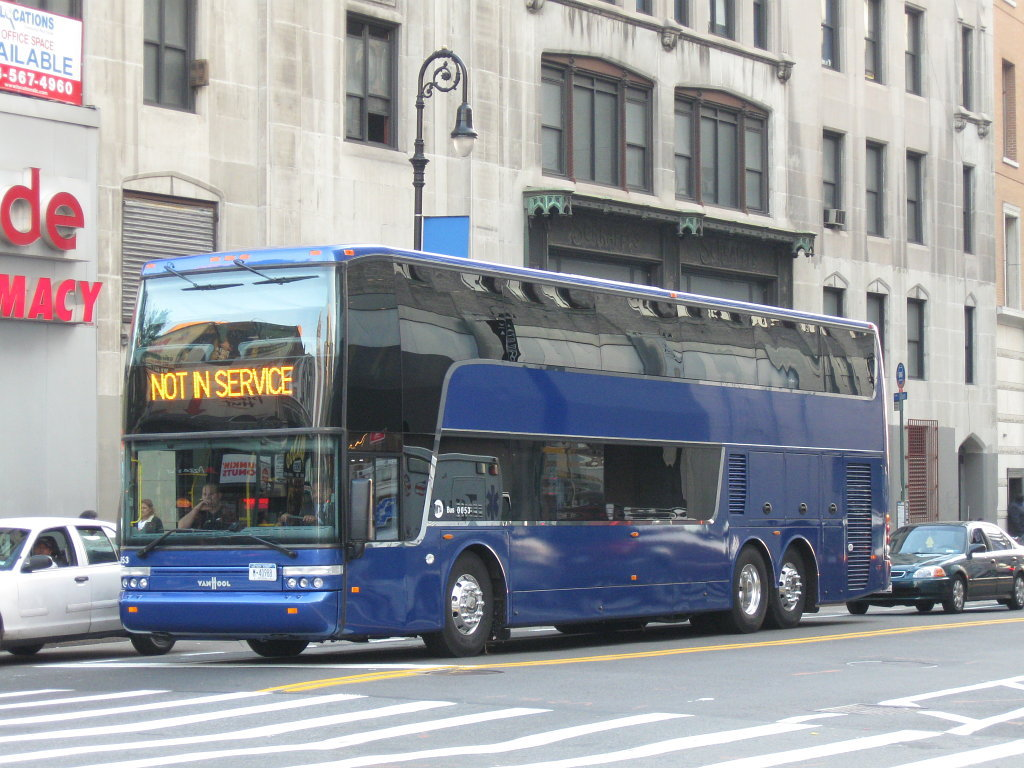
A Van Hool US-specification double-decker bus in New York City, US

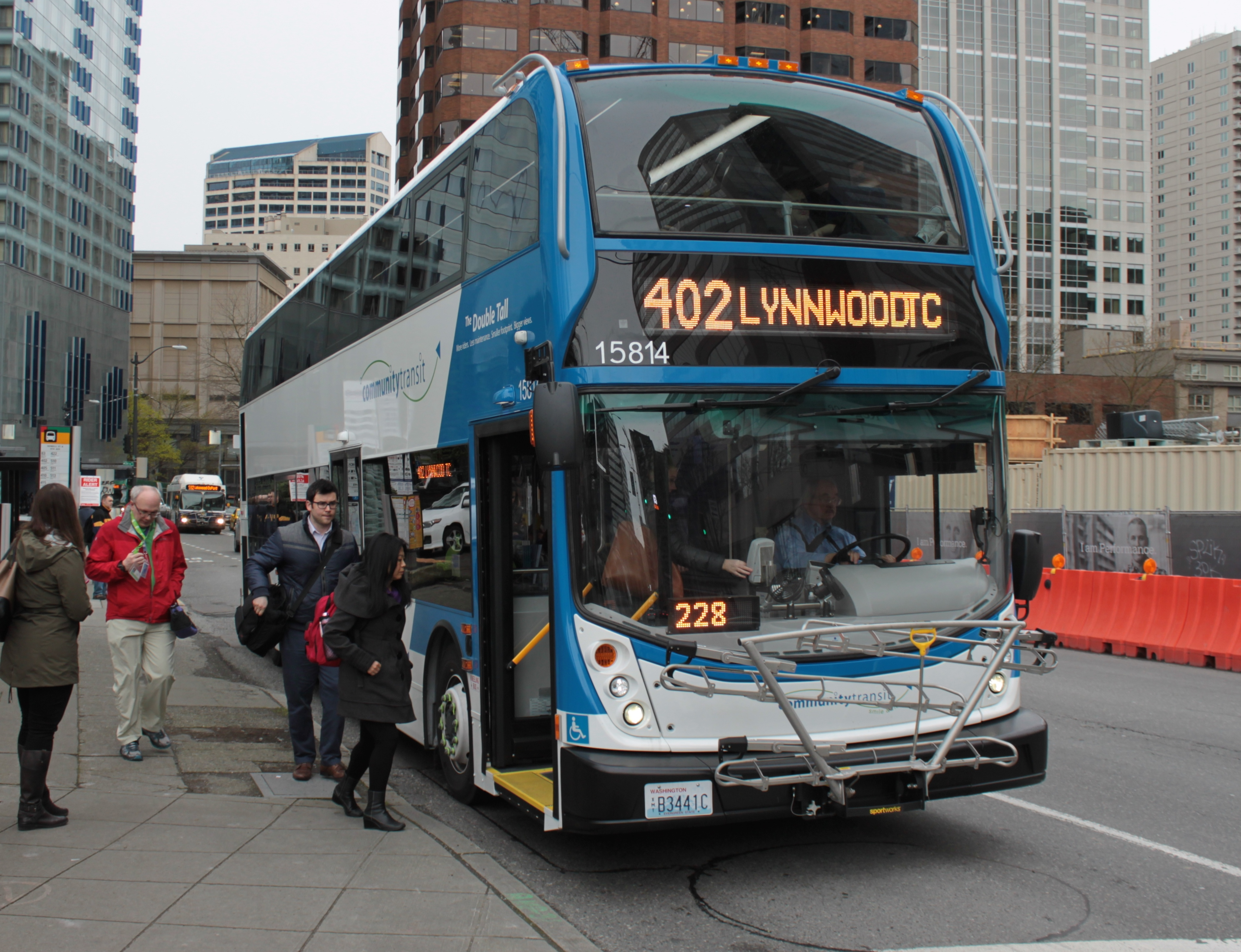
A Community Transit double-decker bus in Downtown Seattle, Washington

With the exception of coaches, double-decker buses are uncommon in the United States. Several private operators, such as Megabus, run by Coach USA, employ double-decker buses on busier intercity routes.

For publicly run transport, articulated buses are generally preferred. Nonetheless, a handful of municipal operators use double-decker buses, primarily on the West Coast.

In Davis, California, Unitrans, the student-run bus company of University of California, Davis, operates six double-decker buses imported from London. One of these buses has been converted to run on compressed natural gas (CNG). There was also the prototype GX-1 Scenicruiser of Greyhound Lines, which enters from the first floor: the second floor contains the driver's compartment and more seats.

Citizens Area Transit, the transit authority in the Las Vegas area, introduced a fleet of double-deckers to serve the Las Vegas Strip route in October 2005. The route is branded as "The Deuce". As of 2009 it serviced eight lines.

In Snohomish County, Washington, Community Transit operates 45 Alexander Dennis Enviro500 double-decker buses, which are used on commuter routes between Snohomish County and Seattle. An initial order of 23 buses went into service in 2011, and a second order of 17 went into service in 2015. Sound Transit, another operator in the Seattle area, bought five double-decker buses through a Community Transit order and began operating their own fleet in 2015. In 2016, a joint procurement between three transit agencies in Washington state ordered additional double-decker buses from Alexander Dennis. Community Transit would order 17 buses, with an option for 40, Sound Transit would receive 32 with an option for 43, and Kitsap Transit would buy 11 of their own. As of 1 January 2020, Community Transit owns 52 and Sound Transit owns 37. Community transit purchased 23 in 2010 (10800-10822), 22 in 2015 (15800-15821), and 8 in 2019 (19850-19857). Sound transit purchased 5 in 2015 (91501-91505) and another 32 in 2017 (91701-91732). One of the 10800s has been retired, bringing the total for Community Transit from 53 to 52.

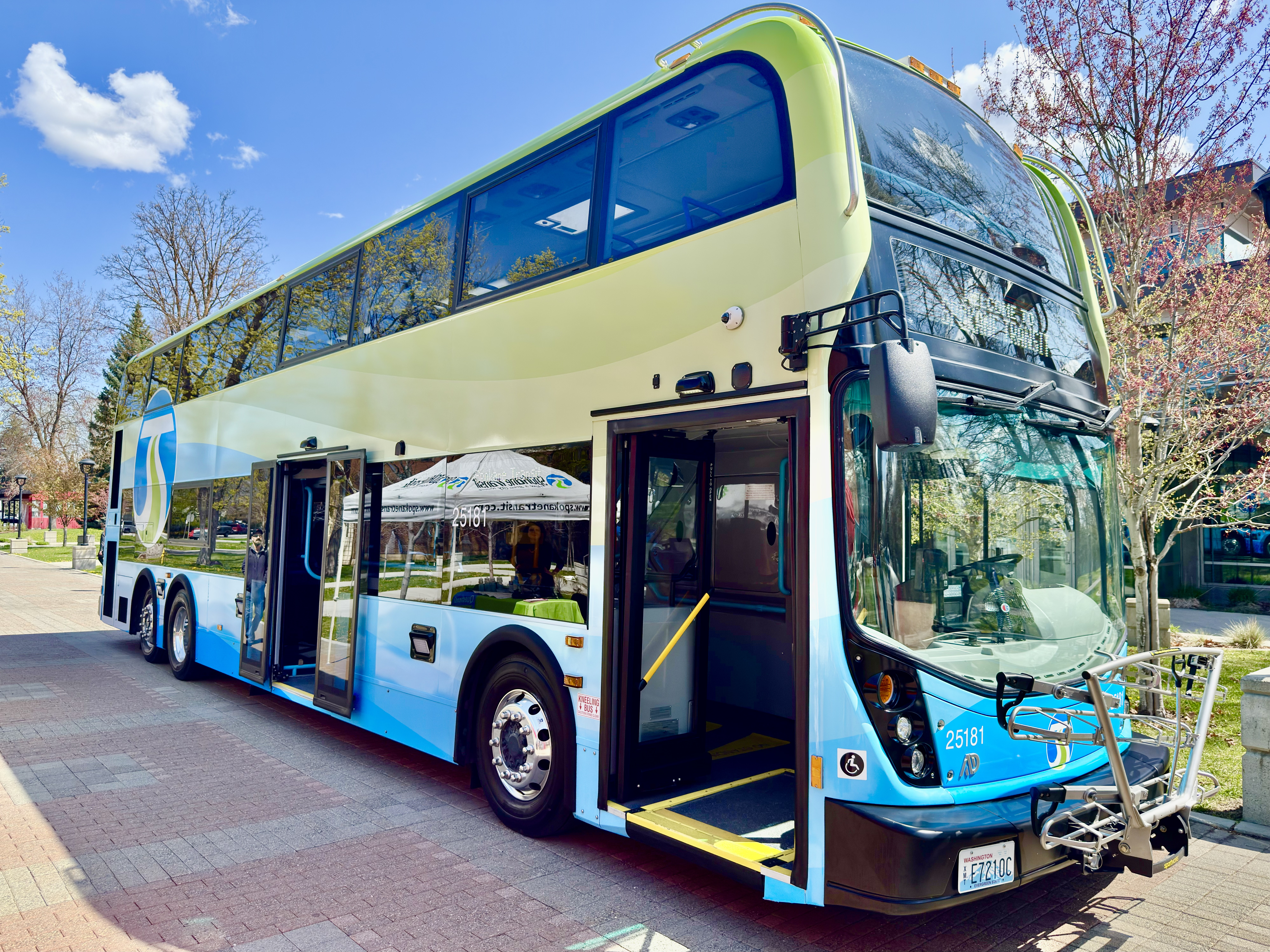
Spokane Transit Alexander Dennis Enviro500 MMC double-decker bus at Eastern Washington University

In San Luis Obispo, California, SLO Transit tested a double-decker bus in late 2008 to see if it would alleviate the over-crowdedness of Route 4. The borrowed bus has been returned, and SLO Transit has purchased one double-decker bus of its own using a combination of Federal, State and local funding. The bus went into operation on 8 September 2010.

In Los Angeles County, California, Foothill Transit uses double-decker battery electric buses as part of its commuter service to the Los Angeles area.

Also in Los Angeles, SCRTD used Neoplan AN 122/3 Skyliners double-decker buses from the late 1970s until 1993.

New York City phased out double-decker buses in 1960. They briefly returned from 1976 to 1978, although they only ran in Manhattan. In 2008 the Metropolitan Transportation Authority (MTA) briefly ran a Van Hool double-decker bus on several express routes. However, that year's financial crisis meant the end of the trial period. In 2018, the MTA tested another double decker bus, an Alexander Dennis Enviro500 SuperLo, on the X17J express bus route between Manhattan and Staten Island. However, the MTA has no current plans to purchase double decker buses.

In San Francisco, California, the San Francisco Municipal Transportation Agency operated one Alexander Dennis double-decker bus as a demonstrator between 12 December 2007 and 8 January 2008. The bus was running on some high capacity routes as trial.

In California, AC Transit began experimental use of a double-decker bus on the commuter route between Fremont, California, and Stanford University in 2015. On 3 December 2018 the company introduced double-deckers on its FS and J routes from Berkeley to San Francisco, and later added routes L and LA serving Richmond, El Sobrante, San Pablo and Albany.

In Spokane County, Washington, Spokane Transit Authority took delivery and has plans to use 7 Alexander Dennis Enviro500 MMC in 2025. The double-decker buses are planned to be used on routes connecting downtown Spokane, Washington and Cheney, Washington which serves Eastern Washington University.

AppalCART, operated by Watauga County, North Carolina, serving the town of Boone and Appalachian State University, debuted a double-decker bus on 8 July 2025 to alleviate passenger congestion on its network. It is North Carolina's first double-decker bus in transit service.

=== Oceania ===
==== Australia ====
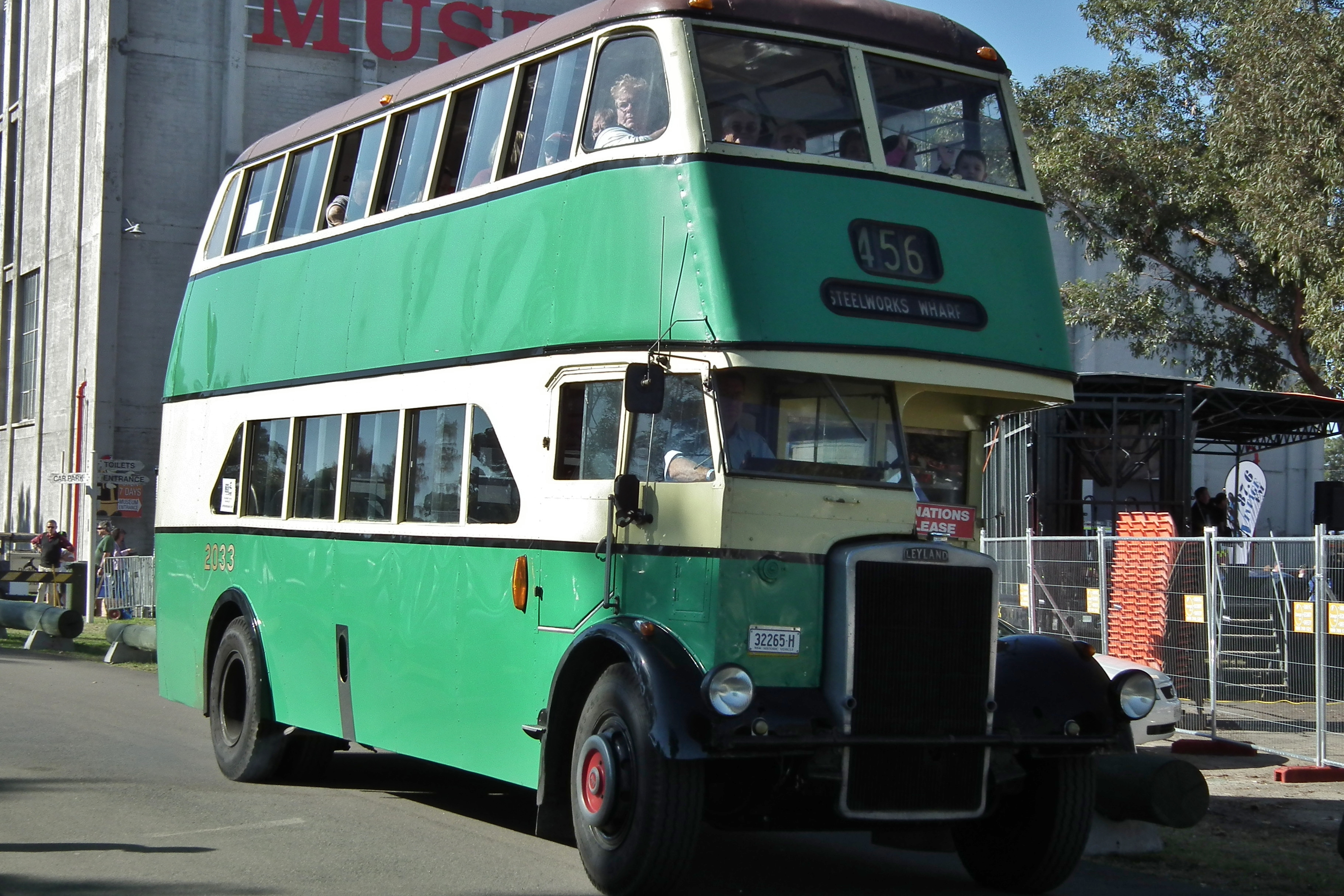
Leyland Titan double decker bus in Sydney, Australia

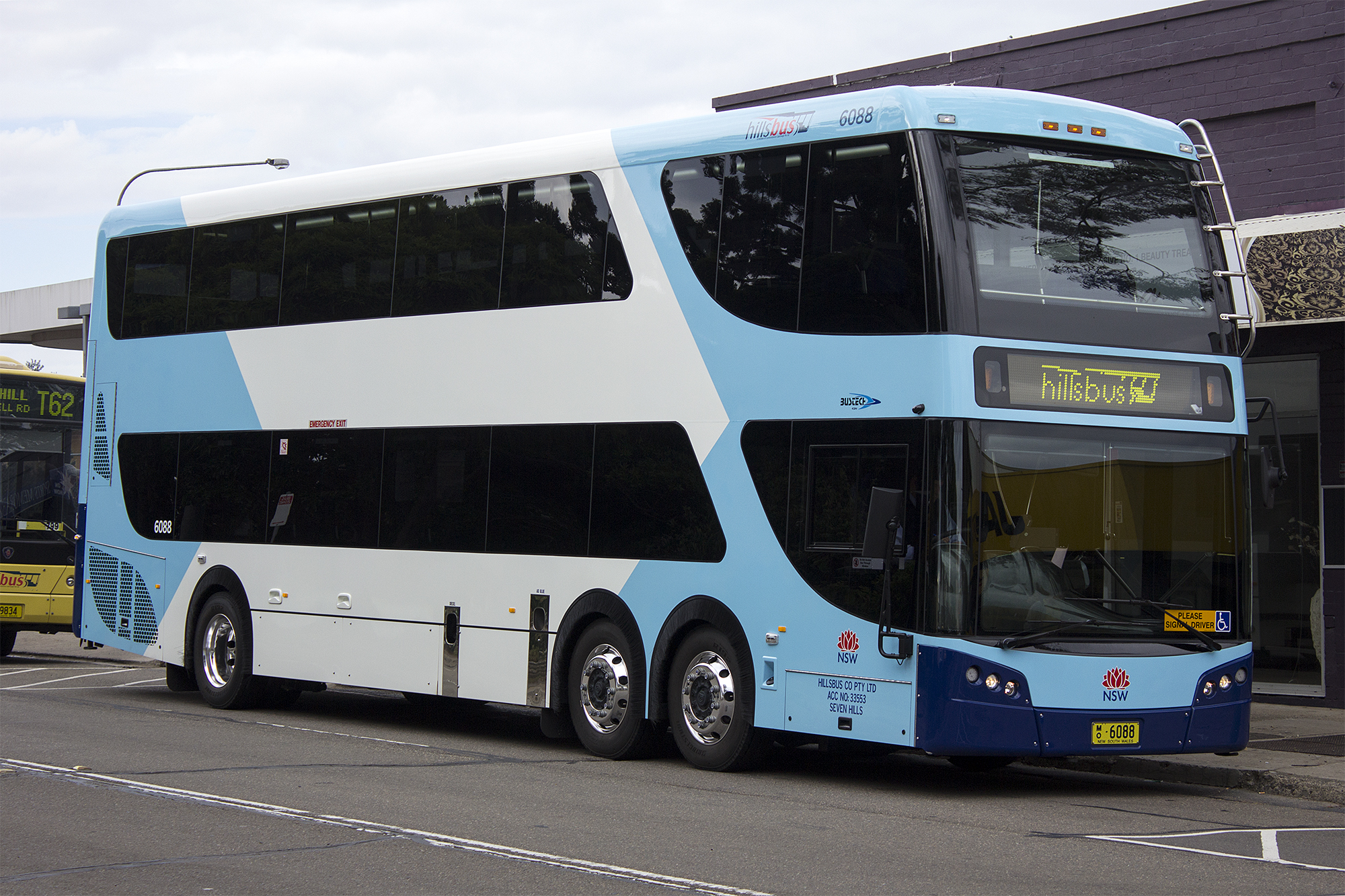
Bustech bodied double decker in Sydney, Australia

Double-decker buses plied route services in Sydney from the 1920s until 1986. Popular makers included AEC, Albion and Leyland. Disputes over one-man operation of double-deckers led to the phasing-out of this configuration. Double-deckers were thereafter limited to charter and tourist services.

Double-decker buses were reintroduced to the Sydney area in 2012, with Busways operating regular services from Blacktown to Rouse Hill, in Sydney's north-west. These were expanded in 2013, to traverse routes from Castle Hill and the Northern Beaches to Sydney's CBD. Forest Coach Lines and Hillsbus also purchased some. The B-Line service uses an exclusive fleet of 42 MAN Lions City A95s.Forrest Coachlines also ordered 3 Gemaling-Bodied MAN A95s, and the Bustech CDI. Hillsbus operates 26 Bustech CDIs, and Transport Systems NSW took delivery of 3 Gemaling bodied Volvo B8l, in 2022

CDC Melbourne bought 1 Volgren bodied Volvo B9TL Melbourne by CDC Melbourne to operate between Werribee, Wyndham Vale and Tarneit railway stations in 2015. this bus was briefly transferred to Sydney, and painted in Hillsbus colours, but was never driven due to axel weight restrictions, and was returned to Melbourne, and is often used on the route 190 Built from 2015 to 2019, SkyBus operates 17 Bustech CDi's between Melbourne Airport and Melbourne's Southern Cross Coach Terminal.

Double deck coaches were built by Denning between 1988 and 1992 with AAT Kings, Australian Pacific Touring and Deluxe Coachlines the main customers. The concept was revived in 2011 by Denning Manufacturing. Volgren fitted double deck coach bodies to Volvo B10Ms in the 1980s for Greyhound.

Transperth used to operate an unknown quantity of Denning double decker bus coaches, on a route between Elizabeth Quay Busport and Mandurah, but were phased out with the introduction of the Mandurah line.

==== New Zealand ====
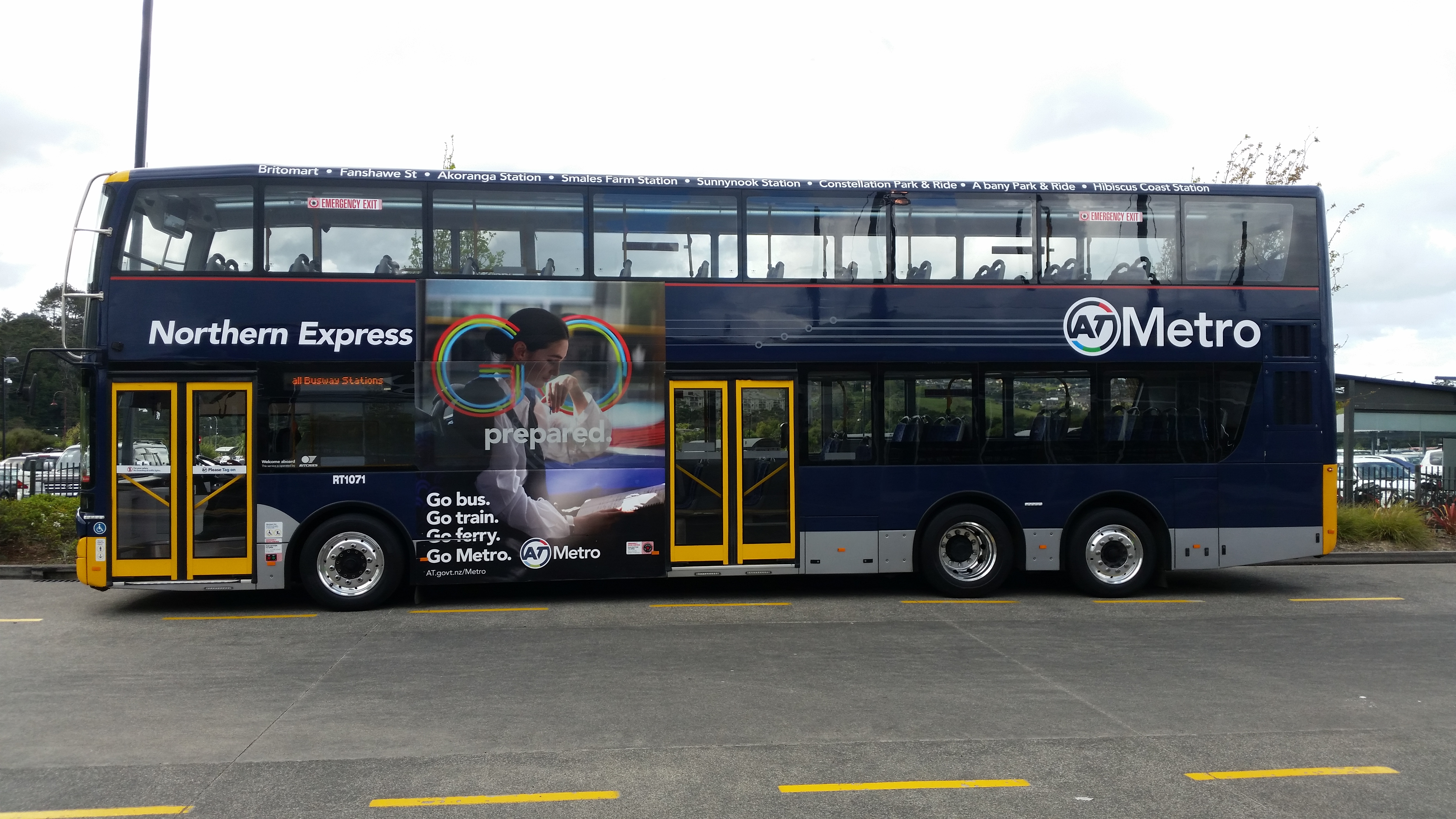
An AT Metro double decker Northern Busway bus at Albany busway station

Until 2013–14, double decker buses were used only by tour operators and for long-distance coach services operated by Intercity Coachlines and Manabus. They were not used for public transport on urban routes.

In the 1970s a number of former London double decker buses were imported for museums, such as the Museum of Transport and Technology who used AEC Regent Low Height (RLH) buses to connect museum sites and for charters. Sydney double decker and more London buses of various models (AEC Regent III RT, AEC Routemasters etc.) were imported by charter and tourist operators and slowly became more commonplace. Bridge heights and shop verandas restricted the use of double deckers around New Zealand until congestion and high public transport use required some innovative solutions.

A single double-decker bus arrived in Auckland in early March 2013 for a trial, with more planned to arrive in 2014 if the trial proved successful. The Scania K320UD bus, operated by Ritchies Transport, began revenue service on 11 March 2013 on the well-patronised Northern Express services on the Northern Busway between Albany and Britomart in downtown Auckland. In addition, NZ Bus and Howick & Eastern investigated the use of double-decker buses on the Dominion Road, Mount Eden Road, and Botany to downtown routes. By May 2016, double deckers were running on the busway and on many other Auckland urban routes, operated by several companies, with more to be introduced.

Four 87-seat DesignLine double deckers started on Waikato services in 2018. Since 15 July 2018, double deckers, including some fully electric models, have been operating in Wellington. There are currently 51 diesel double deckers running and 10 electric ones. 34 of the diesel double deckers are euro 6, while the remaining 17 are euro 5.

=== South America ===
==== Argentina ====
In Argentina, double-decker buses are the second most widely used means of transport for long-distance trips, surpassed only by aeroplanes. Double-decker buses are also popularly used by foreign tourists in Buenos Aires where they're used in city-tours.

==== Bolivia ====
In Bolivia, double-deck buses are a common means of transportation for long-distance trips between large cities such as department capitals. These buses also connect Bolivia with different countries. The double deck buses travel to Argentina, Brazil, Peru and Chile. The buses are equipped with toilets, and several companies offer buses with large seats called Leito (Bus Cama) that can be pulled back and be shaped into a bed.

==== Brazil ====
Double-decker buses, built mainly by Comil or Marcopolo, are common in long-distance services interstate and international connecting whole South America. It is possible to see VIP double-decker buses also connecting cities in the same state, such as São Paulo City, São José do Rio Preto and Ribeirão Preto. Inside these buses there are one TV for each person and boarding service for example. Open double-decker are used for city tours (such as Rio de Janeiro and Bahia). In São Paulo, there was an experience of use for urban services in the 1980s, built by Thamco, but without success due to issues with the height of the vehicle. These buses are fabricated in Brazil and exported to many countries.

==== Chile ====
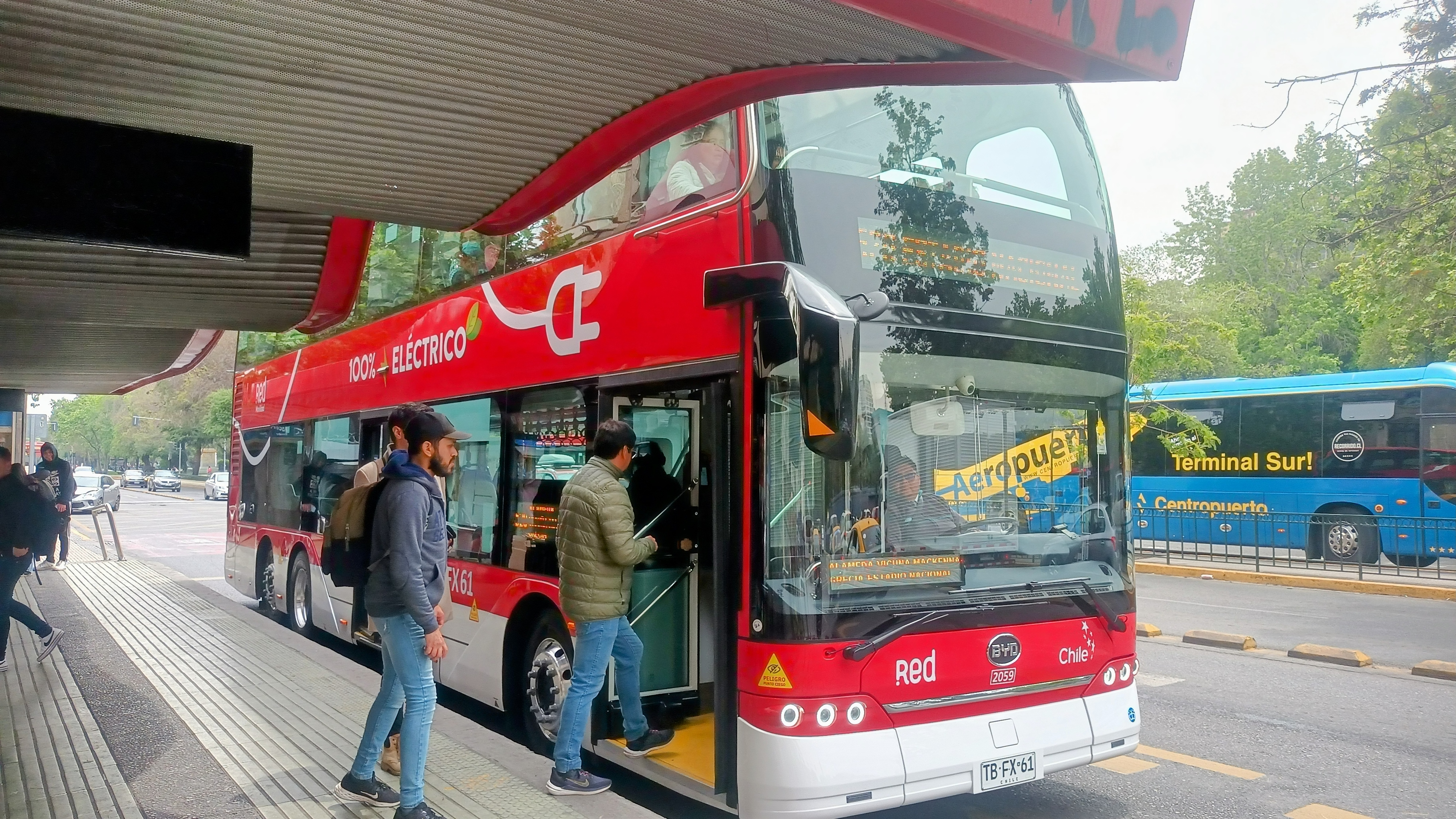
BYD B12C01 double-decker bus operating in Santiago, Chile

The first double-decker intercity buses arrived from Germany at the end of the 1970s to serve national long-distance routes and international services, mainly to Argentina, for the Varmontt, Flota L, Chile Bus and Tas Choapa lines. Since the end of the 1990s, they have become the standard for interurban transport, due to the advantageous cost-benefit ratio for transport companies.

During the decades of 2000 and 2010, the heyday of this means of transport was experienced, which has meant that practically all Chilean intercity bus companies have these buses, this time not of European origin but with bodies in Brazil, Peru, Argentina and some of Chinese Origin. However, on several occasions, the safety and low comfort provided by these vehicles have been a strong subject of discussion; however, the increase in passenger capacity makes them quite profitable for interurban companies.

On 9 March 2017, the British Embassy in Chile reached an agreement with the Ministry of Public Transport in Santiago to test double-decker buses for public transport. That day the first bus, an Alexander Dennis Enviro500 was tested on the streets of Santiago for six weeks.

On 26 February 2019, it was announced that another double-decker bus, a Wrightbus Streetdeck will start to be used in a particular route in Central Santiago. On that day the first bus was tested on Santiago roads.

On 17 August 2023, the first fleet of 10 BYD electric double-decker buses disembarked for public transport that will travel the streets of Santiago de Chile, they are the first double-decker electric buses that currently operate in America and in October 2023 they will be operational to integrate into the public transport network of the Chilean capital.

==== Ecuador ====
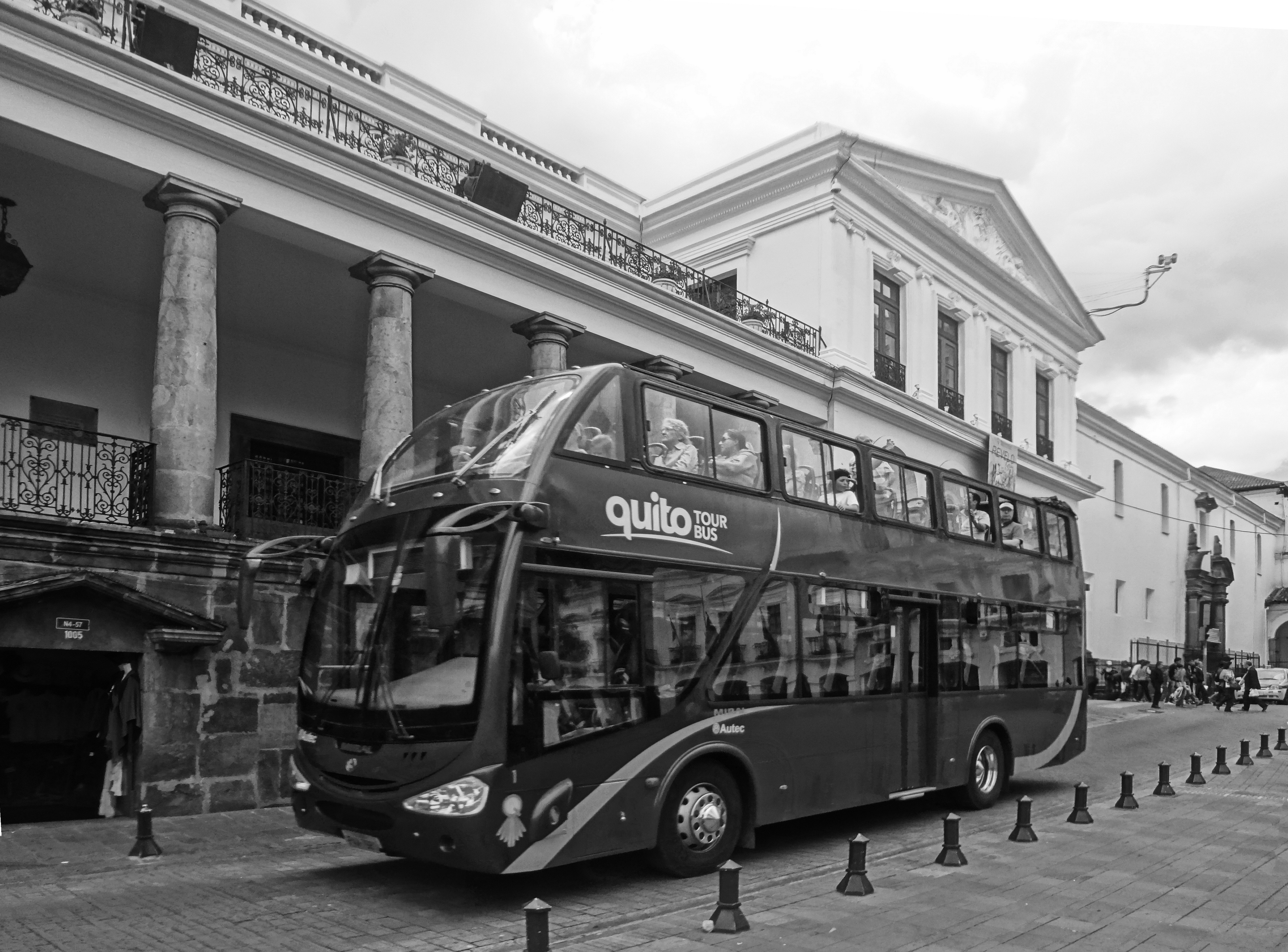
A double-decker bus in front of the Presidential Palace in the Historic Center of Quito - World Heritage Site by UNESCO

Double-decker buses are used in city-tours in Quito, Cuenca and parts of the coast. They are very popular in the touristic district of the Historic District in Quito. Double-decker buses are common on long distance interurban trips.

==== Peru ====
Double-decker buses are common on long distance interurban trips to main cities of the country. Open top double-deckers are used in city tours in downtown Lima and in the tourist district of Miraflores. Pio Delgado Arguedas bought 300 Greyhound buses and was the distributor of the buses in South America and Mexico. He also created TEPSA, and was the owner for years until he sold his company.

==== Uruguay ====
Since the 1990s, Uruguay long-distance bus service operators have operated Brazilian double-deckers. Two AEC Routemasters were imported in the 1970s for urban tourism services – one is now held by the transport heritage group ERHITRAN. In the 2010s Montevideo had an urban tourism circuit using open roof Argentinian double-deckers (suspended with the COVID-19 lockdowns).

== Triple-decker buses ==
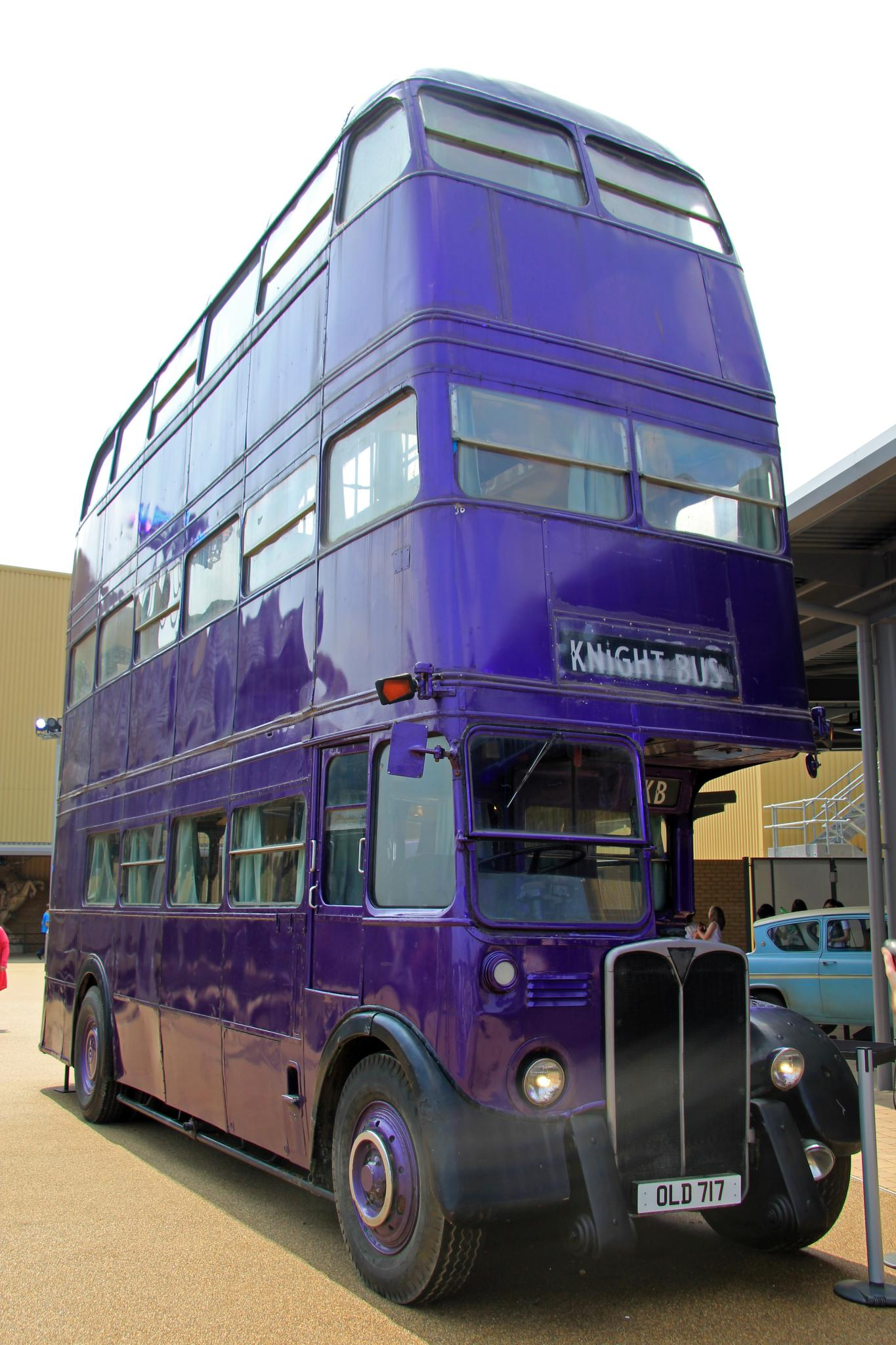
Knight Bus

There have been attempts to build a triple-decker bus. However such vehicles are problematic in that the high centre of gravity leads to instability and there is the risk of hitting trees or bridges. In almost all models the third level was a small compartment in the rear part of the bus, such as a triple-decker capable of carrying eighty-eight people from Rome to Tivoli in 1932 or the General American Aerocoach 3 Decker Bus of 1952. The only three-decker with a full-length third level ever built is the Knight Bus that John Richardson created for Harry Potter and the Prisoner of Azkaban by combining two AEC Regent III RTs. Although the AEC was merely a film prop, a British built ECW bodied Bristol VR double-decker bus imitation of the Knight bus was a functioning bus, which even went on tour. Some coachbuses in Pakistan have a partial bottom level that uses a separate cabin from the upper two levels.

== Comparison with articulated buses ==
Operators worldwide must often decide between articulated and double-decker buses on popular routes. Articulated buses, entirely on one level, offer more room for disabled passengers, luggage and pushchairs; they may also be needed on routes going under low bridges or weak bridges that cannot take high axle loads. Double-decker buses, however, have a smaller road footprint and as such do not disrupt traffic, or block turning lanes as much as articulated buses.

Double-decker buses may be more popular with passengers because of the better view, and with cyclists, who may be at less risk than they are with the unpredictable swing of an articulated bus's tail. Articulated buses normally offer more standing room while double-decker buses may sometimes (not always) offer more seats. Articulated buses have less dwell time because of the extra doors, and double-decker buses offer fewer chances for fare dodgers since there are fewer or no unmanned doors.

== Collisions with bridges ==
There have been a significant number of incidents in which a double-decker bus has collided with a low bridge, often a railway bridge. This is often caused by the driver making a wrong turn, driving a route they are unfamiliar with, or being used to driving single-decker buses and forgetting to allow for their vehicle's extra height when driving a double-decker.

A collision with a railroad bridge by a Megabus in September 2010 at Syracuse, New York, killed four passengers and injured 17.

In recent years in the United Kingdom, six people had minor injuries after their bus hit a railway bridge at Stockport in July 2013. An empty bus had its roof removed after hitting a railway bridge in Birkenhead in December 2014.

In March 2015, a bus carrying 76 children hit a bridge at Staines-upon-Thames. Eleven passengers were taken to hospital but none were seriously injured. In the same month, an empty bus had its roof removed after hitting a railway bridge in Isleworth West London. A Stagecoach Highlands bus collided with a railway bridge at Balloch, Highland, Scotland in April 2015. There were no casualties, one top-deck passenger narrowly escaped injury by throwing himself to the floor.

A bus operated by Bluestar had its roof removed after colliding with a railway bridge at Romsey in May 2015. An incident in July 2015 in Norwood, London also resulted in the removal of the bus' roof; seven people were injured. Similar incidents occurred in September 2015 in Rochdale, Greater Manchester (seventeen were injured) and in Bournemouth in April 2016, with all thirty passengers escaping without injury.

On 11 September 2020, a bus carrying 72 children hit a bridge, taking the complete roof off, in Winchester, Hampshire, on the way to school. Three children were seriously injured and required surgery whilst a further 12 suffered minor injuries. The bus was operated by Stagecoach South.

In May 2023, ten people were taken to hospital after a bus crashed into a railway bridge on Cook Street, Glasgow. The same bridge was involved in another crash in December 2024. Again, the roof of a bus was torn off, this time after the driver reportedly took a wrong turn into the one-way street. Numerous injuries were caused and eight people went to hospital. Days later, in a separate incident, another double decker bus hit another railway bridge in Scotland, in Kilmarnock.

In July 2025, twenty people were injured after a bus crashed struck the Bridgewater Canal aqueduct bridge on Barton Lane in Eccles and having the roof torn off. Another collision occurred at the railway bridge on Ten Acres Lane, Newton Heath, being the second crash within 24 hours in Greater Manchester.

== In popular culture ==
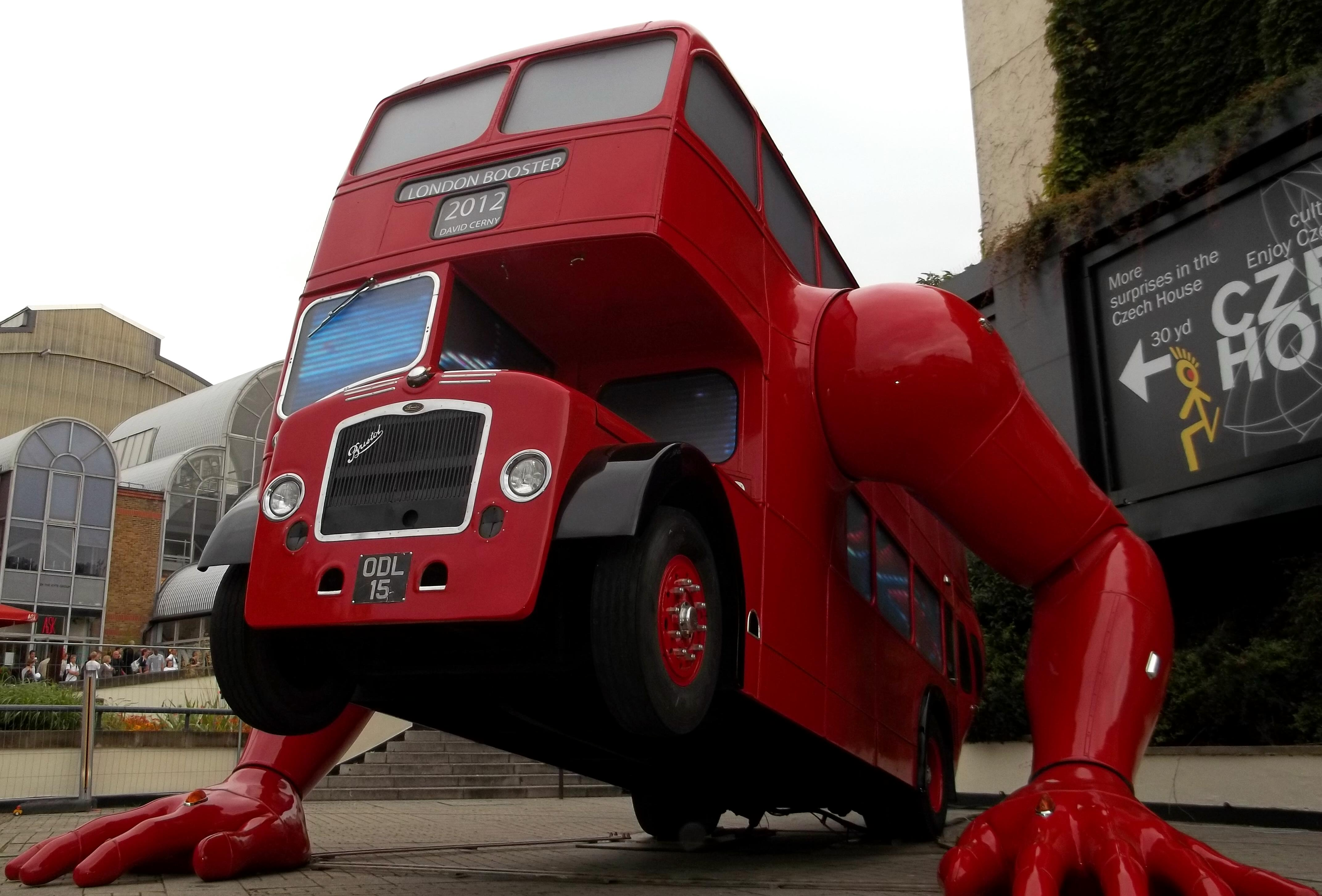
The London Booster moving sculpture

- In the film Summer Holiday, Cliff Richard and friends drive a double-decker bus fitted out as a caravan across Europe.
- In The Mummy Returns, Rick O'Connell (Brendan Fraser), Evelyn O'Connell (Rachel Weisz), Ardeth Bay (Oded Fehr), Jonathan Carnahan (John Hannah) and Alex O'Connell (Freddie Boath) are chased by mummies whilst they ride on a AEC Regent III RT in London.
- In Live and Let Die, Roger Moore as James Bond, drives one being chased. The chase involving the double-decker bus was filmed with a former London bus adapted by having the top sliced off, then put back in place running on ball bearings to allow it to slide away from the undercarriage on impact with a low bridge. The stunts involving the bus were performed by Maurice Patchett, a London Transport bus driving instructor.
- A double deck bus features at the end of the final episode of the sitcom The Young Ones.
- The British sitcom On the Buses features double deckers, driven by Stan Butler (portrayed by Reg Varney).
- In Harry Potter and the Prisoner of Azkaban, the aforementioned Knight Bus is a triple-decker bus which can fit under bridges due to magic.
- During the 2012 Summer Olympics, Czech artist David Černý presented his moving sculpture named London Booster, a full-sized "London double-decker bus" (actually ex-Southern Vectis from the Isle of Wight) permanently doing push-ups with hydraulic-powered human-like arms. This was an accompanying installation outside temporarily Czech Olympic House in London borough of Islington.
- The double decker bus is a star in the 1970s Saturday morning TV series titled Here Come the Double Deckers.
- A double decker bus is featured in the 2009 Doctor Who episode "Planet of the Dead", where it transports its passengers through a wormhole to the alien planet of San Helios.
- The British television series Thomas & Friends features an anthropomorphic AEC Bridgemaster named Bulgy, a character infamous for his dislike for railways. He deems roads superior to rail traffic, and often tells lies or sabotages the railways to make the roads flourish. He always gets his comeuppance in the end, though he refuses to give up his beliefs.

== List of double-decker buses (including coaches and trolleybuses) ==
- Adiputro Jetbus Super Double Decker
- AEC 661T
- AEC 663T
- AEC 664T
- AEC 691T
- AEC 761T
- AEC Bridgemaster
- AEC K-type
- AEC Q-type
- AEC Regent I
- AEC Regent II
- AEC Regent III
- AEC Regent III RT
- AEC Regent IV
- AEC Regent V
- AEC Routemaster
- Alexander ALX400
- Alexander ALX500
- Alexander Dennis Enviro400
- Alexander Dennis Enviro400 City
- Alexander Dennis Enviro400 MMC
- Alexander Dennis Enviro400EV
- Alexander Dennis Enviro500
- Alexander Dennis Enviro500 MMC
- Alexander Dennis Enviro500EV
- Ashok Leyland Titan
- Ayats Bravo
- BCI CitiRider
- BMMO D9
- BMMO D10
- Bristol K
- Bristol Lodekka
- Bristol VR
- Beulas Jewel
- Bombardier DD
- BÜSSING D2U
- BÜSSING D3
- BÜSSING D38
- BÜSSING DE 72 LVG
- Bustech CDi
- BYD B12D Double Decker
- Daimler/Leyland Fleetline
- Dennis Dragon
- Dennis Trident 2
- Dennis Trident 3
- Duple Metsec DM5000
- Foton BJ6128EVCA
- Gemilang Coachworks Double Decker
- Hyundai Elec City Double Decker
- Jinghua BK6110S Double Decker
- Laksana Legacy SR eXtra Double Decker
- Leyland Atlantean
- Leyland-DAB Lion
- Leyland Olympian
- Leyland Titan
- Leyland Titan (B15)
- MAN Lion's City DD A39
- MAN Lion's City DD A95
- Mávaut-Ikarus 556
- MCV DD102
- MCV DD103
- MCV EvoSeti
- MCV Electric Bus
- MCW Metrobus
- MCW Metroliner
- MCW/Scania Metropolitan
- Marcopolo S.A. Paradiso 1800 G7
- Mercedes-Benz O305
- Mitsubishi Fuso Aero King
- Morodadi Prima patriot Three Pointed Star Double Decker
- Neoplan Centroliner Double Decker
- Neoplan Jumbocruiser
- Neoplan Megaliner
- Neoplan Skyliner
- New Routemaster
- New Armada Evolander
- New Armada Highlander
- New Armada Skylander
- Nusantara Gemilang Maxi Miracle Double Decker
- Nusantara Gemilang Conqueror Double Decker
- Opel Blitz Aero Strassenzepp Doppeldecker
- Optare MetroDecker
- Rahayu Santosa Jetliner Double Decker
- Scania Citywide LFDD
- Scania OmniCity DD
- Scania OmniDekka
- Scania KUD
- Scania NUD
- Setra S 228 DT
- Setra S 328 DT
- Setra S 431 DT
- Stallion Bus Double Decker
- Switch Mobility EiV 22
- Thaco TB120SS
- Thaco TB138SS
- Tentrem Avante D2
- Van Hool Astromega TD8/TD9/TDX series
- VDL Citea DLF-114
- VDL Futura FDD2
- Volvo Ailsa B55
- Volvo B5TL
- Volvo B5LH
- Volvo B7TL
- Volvo B8L
- Volvo B8RLE
- Volvo B9TL
- Volvo BZL
- Volvo Mexico
- Volvo B10MD city bus
- Volvo Olympian
- Volvo B10TL Super Olympian
- Wright Eclipse Gemini
- Wright SRM
- Wright StreetDeck
- Weisheit WSD6121BR1EV
- Yutong City Master
- Yutong E12DD
- Zhongtong N12D

== See also ==
- Articulated bus
- Bilevel rail car
- Clerestory bus
- List of buses
- List of bus operating companies
