= List of AEC buses =

This is a list of Associated Equipment Company (AEC) and London General Omnibus Company (LGOC) buses from 1909 to closure in 1979.

== LGOC / AEC (1909–1918) ==
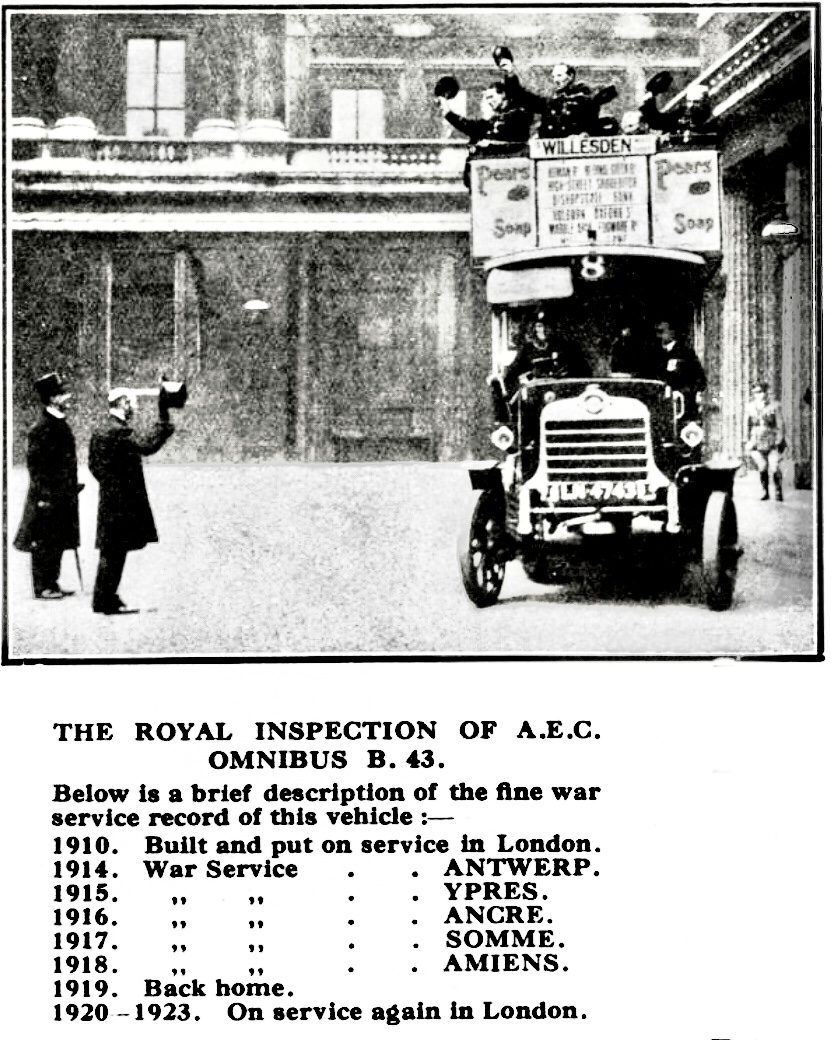
AEC B 43 (1910-1919)

- X-type
- B-type
- W
- Z
- Y

== 1918–1941 ==
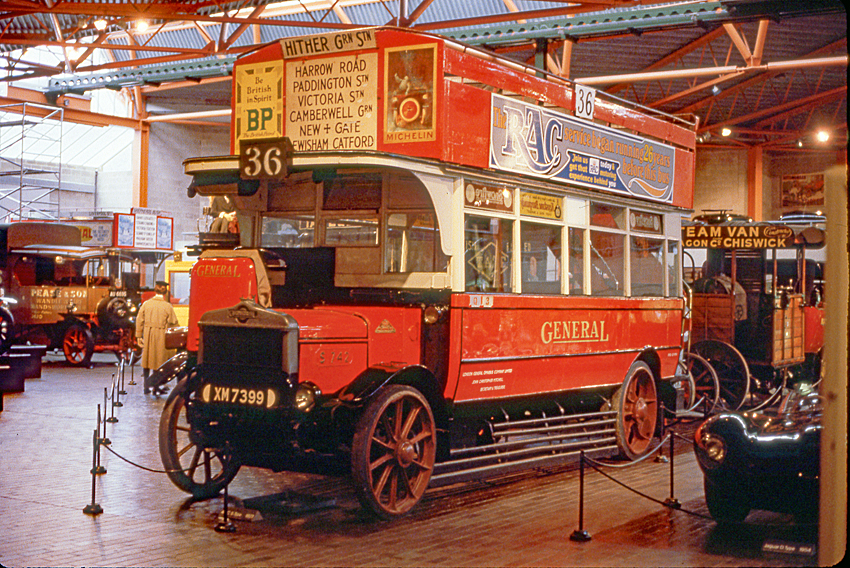
LGOC S 742 AEC S-Type in the National Motor Museum, Beaulieu

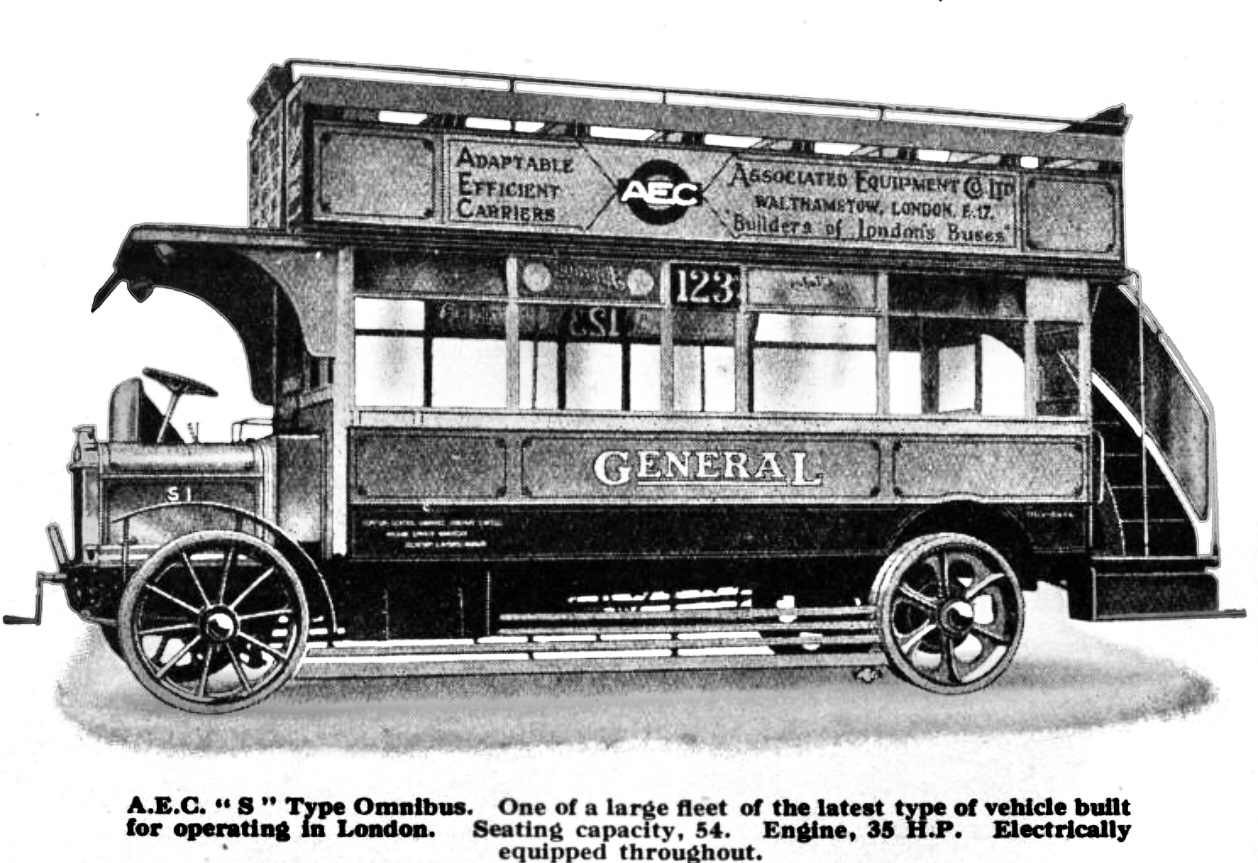
AEC 403 Type S (1920-1924)

- K-type (1919–1926)
- S-type (1920–1927)
- NS-type (1922–1929)
- 400-series
- 500-series
- Renown 411/413-series (1925–1929)
- LS-type (1927–1928)
- Reliance 660-series (1928–1932), transitional model featuring newly developed 6-cylinder engine in 1920s type chassis
- LT-type (1929–1933), with six wheels; first 150 had outside staircases due to enforcement by the Metropolitan Police. Both single and double deck
- ST-type (1929–1931), similar to LT-type, but shorter
- Mercury 640/O640-series (1930–35), normal control 3.5 ton lorry sometimes bodied as a light coach
- Regal 662/O662-series (1929–40), principal AEC single deck model of the 1930s
- Regal 4 642/O642-series (1930–37), variant of Regal with smaller (4-cylinder) engine
- Regal II 862/O862-series (1935–39), variant of Regal with shortened bonnet to allow higher seating capacity
- Ranger 650-series (1934), normal control version of Regal 4, only 2 built
- Ranger 665/O665-series (1930–38), normal control version of Regal
- Ranger 670/O670-series (1931–37), export version of Ranger, predominantly for Canada
- Regent 661/O661-series (1929–1942), principal AEC double deck model of the 1930s
- Renown 663-series (1929–1938), 3-axle double decker
- Renown 664/O664-series (1930–40), longer variant of Renown built as either single or double deck
- Q-type 761/O761-series (1933–1936), double deck variant of Q-type
- Q-type 762/O762-series (1932–1937), single decker with side-mounted engine positioned behind front axle
- Q-type O763-series (1937), one-off 3-axle Q-type double decker

== 1945–1979 ==
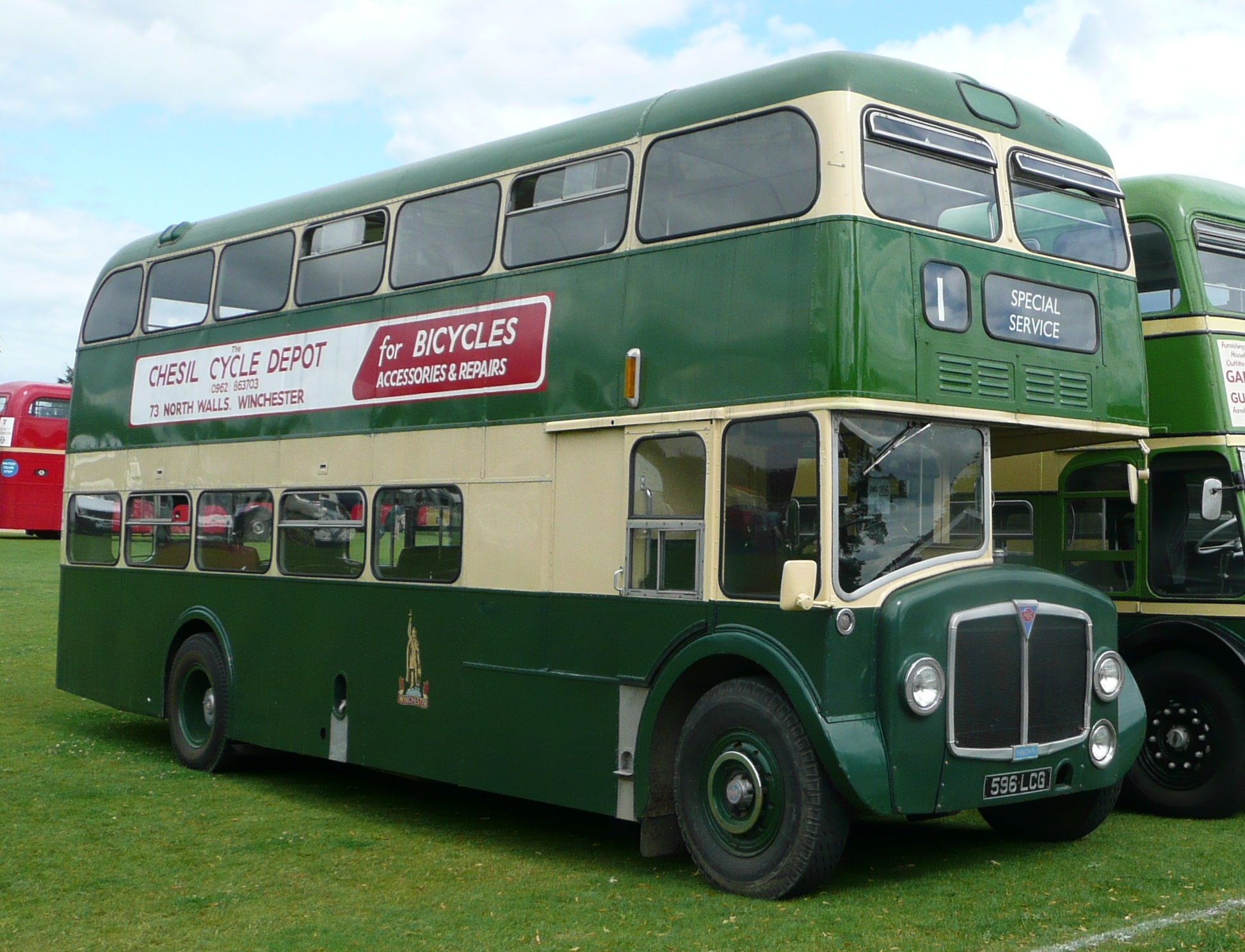
A preserved 1964 AEC Renown, previously run by King Alfred Motor Services and currently owned by the Friends of King Alfred Buses (FoKAB)

- Regent II (1945–1947)
- Regent III RT-type (1939–1954)
- Regent III (1947–1957)
- Regal I (1946–1947)
- Regal III (1947–1953)
- Regal IV (1949–1960), underfloor-engined single decker
- Regal V (1955–1959)
- Reliance (1953–1979)
- Monocoach (Integral)
- Regent V (1954–1969)
- Routemaster (1954–1968)
- Ranger (1955–?), export model based on the Mercury/Monarch lorry
- Bridgemaster (1956–1962)
- Ranger (1957–1979)
- Renown (1962–1967)
- Regal VI (1962–1979)
- Swift (1964–1979)
- Merlin (1965–1972)
- Sabre (1968–1970)

=== Prototypes ===
- T-type (1920)
- Regent IV (1949) – an underfloor-engined double decker with only a one-off prototype built
- FRM Rear-engined Routemaster (1966)

== Trolleybuses ==
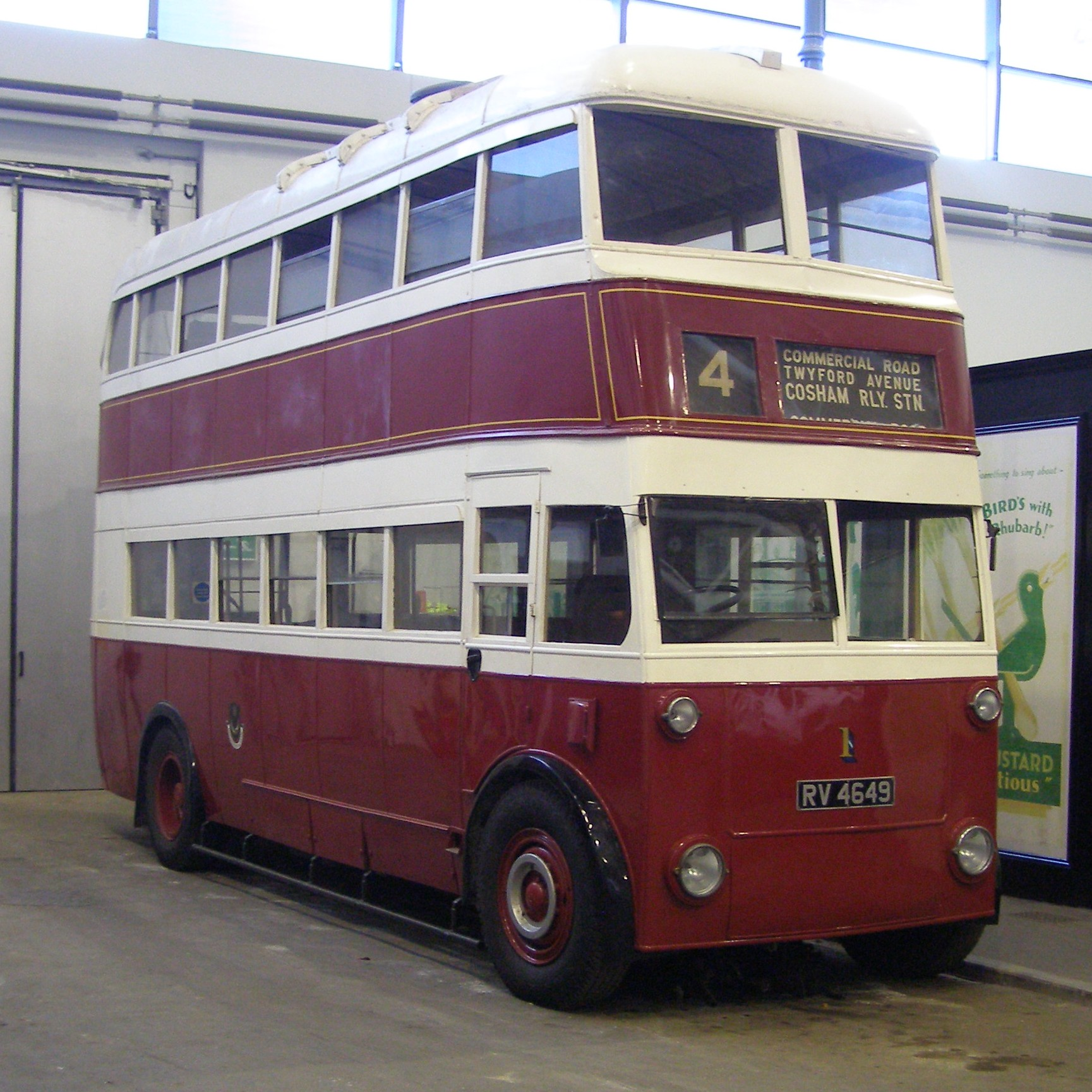
1934-built AEC 661T

- 601
- 602
- 603 / 603T
- 604
- 605
- 607
- 661T
- 662T
- 663T
- 664T
- 691T
- 761T

== See also ==
- Associated Equipment Company
- List of buses
