= Frank Searle =

Frank Searle may refer to:

- Frank Searle (businessman) (1874–1948), chief engineer of the London General Omnibus Company and managing director of Imperial Airways
- Frank Searle (cryptozoologist) (1921–2005), British photographer of the Loch Ness Monster
- Frank Searle (footballer) (1906–1977), English footballer

== See also ==
- Francis Searle, English film director, writer and producer
