= AEC K-type =

British Associated Equipment Company bus chassis

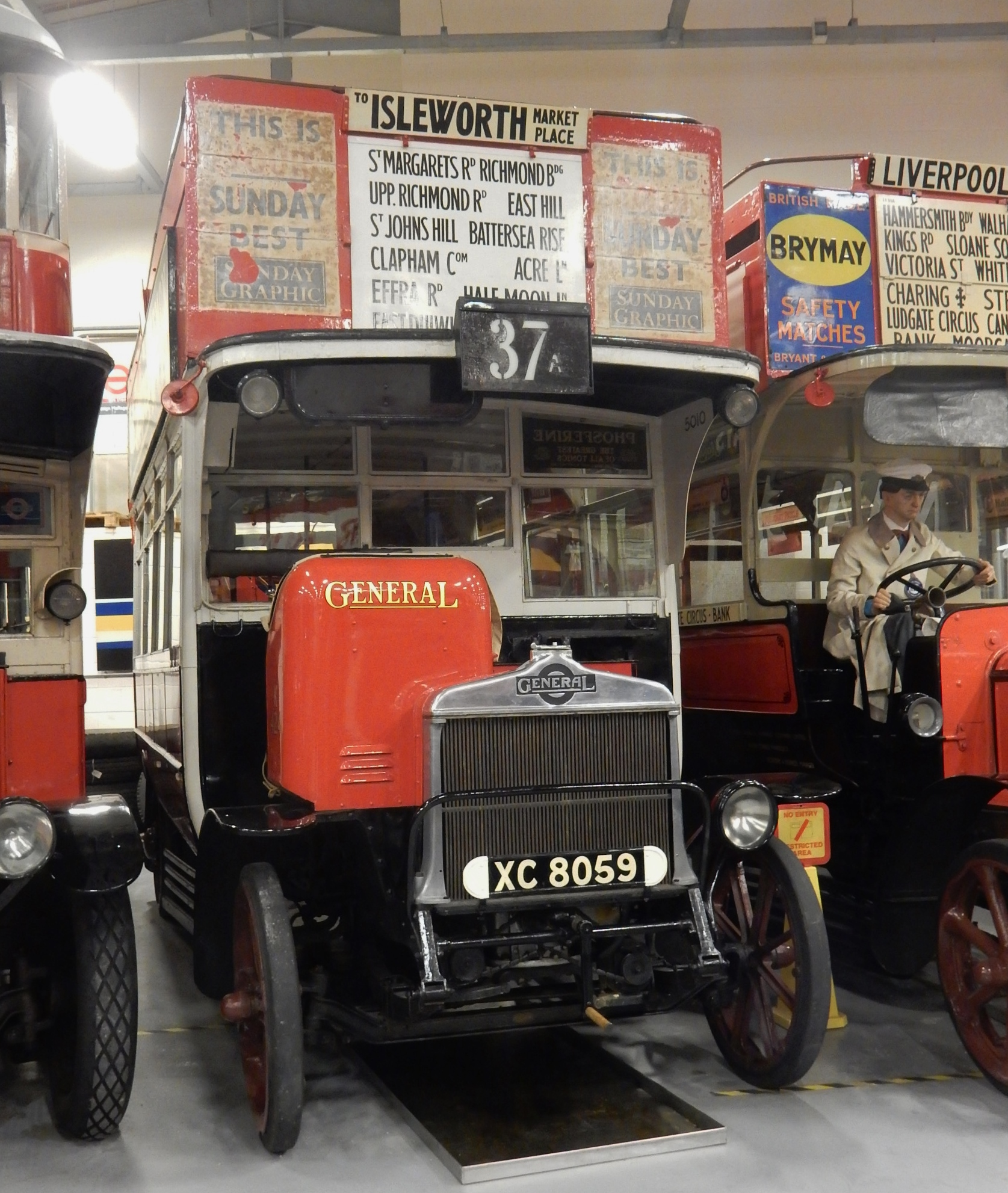
- AEC K-type at the London Transport Museum, Acton in April 2019

Overview
- Manufacturer: Associated Equipment Company

Body and chassis
- Doors: 1
- Floor type: Step entrance

The AEC K-type was a type of bus chassis built by Associated Equipment Company (AEC) from 1919 until 1926, mainly for use in London by the London General Omnibus Company (LGOC).

== Description ==
The K-type was an important design that ended the horse-drawn omnibus influence on bus layout apparent in the LGOC X-type and LGOC B-type. By placing the driver beside the engine and using a wider, straight-sided body, seating capacity was increased from 34 passengers to 46 passengers. The open-top body continued to use transverse seating on the upper deck, but the additional width allowed the use of transverse seating on the lower deck as well. The bodywork was typically built by LGOC, but Short Brothers, Brush and Strachans all built smaller numbers to the same standard design.

== History ==
The K-type chassis was first designed by LGOC in 1914, but development was delayed by the First World War. The first chassis was completed in August 1919. The chassis was fitted with a 30 hp 4.4-litre four-cylinder engine and had a three-speed chain gearbox and multiplate clutch.

The vast majority of K-types entered service with LGOC. The first vehicle, K1, entered service in August 1919 and was followed by K2 in September 1919. These two buses, were used for development, together with K3 which was used for chassis instruction and never received a body. The next batch of 1,040 K-types entered service from May 1920 until 1921, and were mainly used in central London. This allowed smaller B-types to be used on new routes in and around London. Smaller batches were delivered between 1924 and 1926, bringing the total to 1,132. Most of the bodies were built by LGOC, but some were also supplied by Short Brothers, Brush and Strachan.

Outside of London, six K-types were sold to Torquay Tramways for feeder services to tram routes. A further twelve were bought by East Surrey Traction Company between 1920 and 1921. This company also received transfers of the type from LGOC in order to operate services in Kent and Surrey on its behalf.

Although originally designed as a double-deck vehicle, a single deck version entered service in 1925. The initial batch of 24 (K1078 - K1101) entered service in August 1925 with 24-seat bodies on new chassis. These were the first vehicles to use pneumatic tyres in London. Subsequent batches of single-deck K-types used new bodies on the chassis of older double-deck vehicles from which the body had been removed. Conversely, future orders of the new single-deck chassis received double-deck bodywork.

The K-type, together with the larger S-type and more advanced NS-type, remained the standard London bus until 1930, when the introduction of the LT and ST types began. Most K-types were withdrawn from service by early 1931, with final vehicles being withdrawn from service on route 90 on 22 June 1932.

== Legacy ==
Today, K424 remains preserved at the London Transport Museum, and still appears at rallies and special events.

== AEC T-type ==
AEC T-type

Overview
- Manufacturer: Associated Equipment Company

Body and chassis
- Doors: 1
- Floor type: Step entrance

The AEC T-type was an attempt in 1920 to create a bus with a greater seating capacity for use in London.

The T-type was essentially an AEC K-type stretched in length by 2 ft 3 in (0.69 m), with the front axle moved rearward. This gave the vehicle a somewhat awkward appearance. The length was outside the then-permitted dimensions for buses in London. Only one vehicle was built, and was it used in trial service in London during early 1920. Following the trials, the permitted length was increased, and the AEC S-type was developed.

== See also ==
- List of buses

== Sources ==
- Thackray, Brian (2001). The AEC Story:Part 1. Venture Publications Ltd. ISBN 1-898432-37-6
- Thackray, Brian (2004). AEC Vehicles: Origins to 1929. Venture Publications Ltd. ISBN 1-898432-44-9
- Townsin, A. A. (1980). Blue Triangle. Transport Publishing Company. ISBN 0-903839-34-2
