= K-type =

K-type may refer to:

- AEC K-type, a bus chassis
- K-type star, a stellar spectral classification
- K-type filter, a type of electronic filter
- K-type asteroid, an unusual kind of asteroid
