= Q-type =

Q-type or Type Q may refer to:

- a Q-type asteroid
- the MG Q-type, a car
- the AEC Q-type, a bus
- a Q-type star
- the Percival Type-Q, an aircraft
- a Q-type calcium channel

== See also ==
- For Q (and P) in propositional logic, see modus ponens.
