= AEC NS-type =

British Associated Equipment Company bus chassis

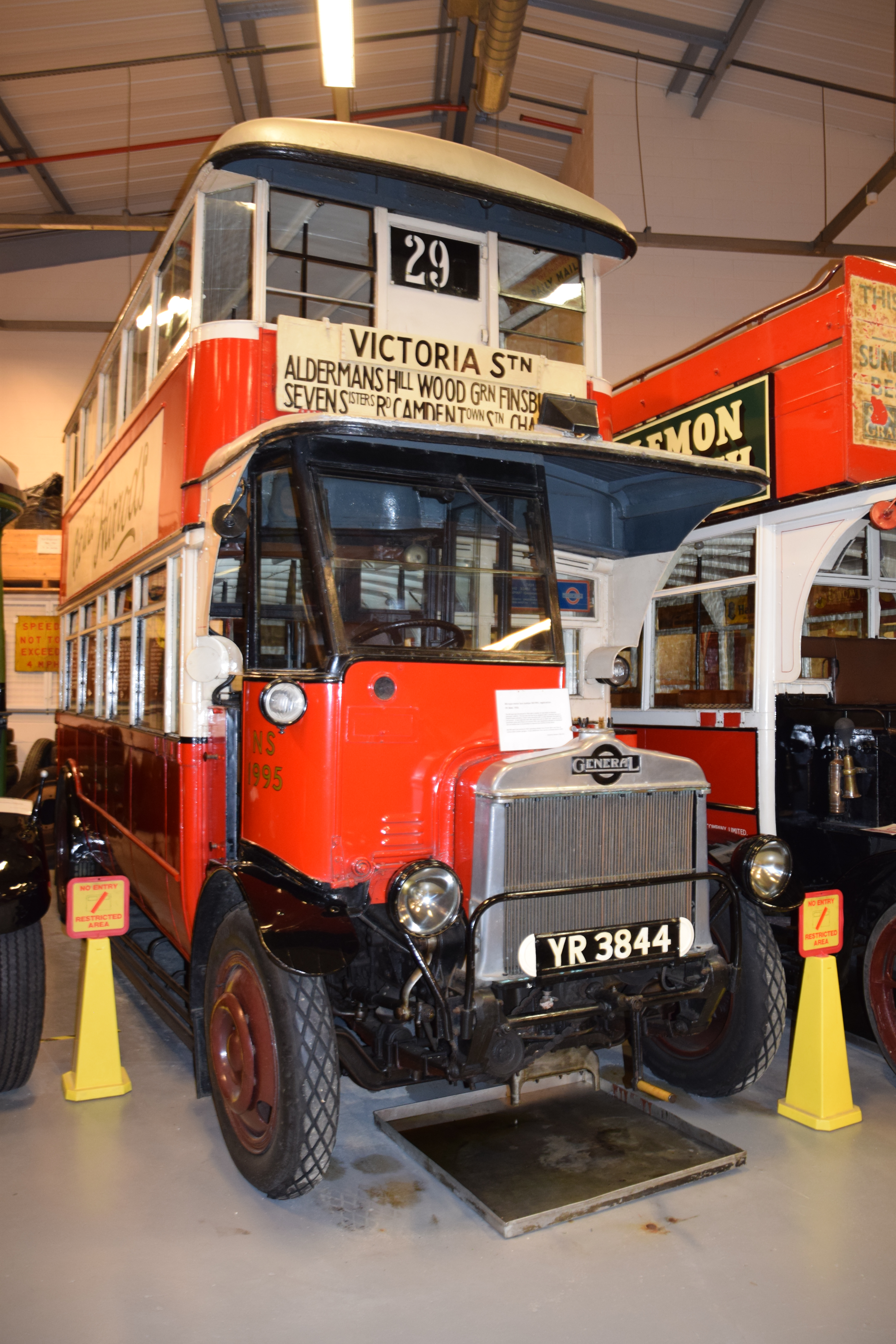
- AEC NS-type

Overview
- Manufacturer: AEC
- Production: 1923–1927

Body and chassis
- Doors: 1 door
- Floor type: Step entrance

Powertrain
- Engine: AEC 4-cylinder side-valve petrol
- Capacity: 50–52; 24 lower deck, 26–28 upper deck
- Power output: 35 horsepower (26 kW)
- Transmission: 3-speed chain drive

Dimensions
- Length: 25 feet 3 inches (7.70 m)
- Width: 7 feet 2 inches (2.18 m)
- Height: 14 feet 3 inches (4.34 m)
- Curb weight: 6.25 long tons (6.35 t)

Chronology
- Predecessor: AEC K-type
- Successor: AEC ST-type

The AEC NS-type is a model of double-decker bus that was introduced in London in 1923. It was designed by AEC in cooperation with, and operated by, the London General Omnibus Company (LGOC).

== Design ==
The designation NS was derived from "Nulli Secundus" – "Second to None". The bus was fitted with a cranked chassis, allowing a covered top, lower floor and a single step entrance. The prototype was fitted with a temporary covered top but the Metropolitan Police wouldn't issue it with a licence so the bus entered service on 10 May 1923 as an open-top vehicle with solid tyres. In 1925, the authorities relented and covered tops were allowed. In 1928, pneumatic tyres were substituted for solid tyres and in 1930, the driver gained an enclosed cab.

From 1919, AEC had given each model (and some variants) a three-digit type number, which also formed the first part of the chassis number. In this system, the initial digit represented the nominal load capacity in tons. The 4-ton series had begun in 1920 with Type 401, or the AEC S-type, and the original version of the NS-type was Type 405. This had a gearbox having helical gears, but this was troublesome and subsequently AEC returned to using a chain-driven gearbox, as they had used with the S-type. Two versions of this transmission were used, giving Types 407 and 408, the latter being preferred by the LGOC. For sales to operators other than the LGOC, Type 409 was also produced from 1925. Type 422, introduced in 1927, had pneumatic tyres.

== Service life ==
About 2,400 NS-type buses were bought by LGOC and they continued in service until the end of 1937. The last service being on route 166 from Aldwych to Bank on 30 November.

Subsequently, several were used for work such as tree-lopping and maintenance of overhead wiring for trolleybuses. Twelve were converted for use as mobile staff canteens.

Some were also used outside London. D. Bassett briefly operated a fleet around Llanelly in South Wales in the late 1920s. Buses were delivered in late 1926, but sold to LGOC in mid-1928.

== Preservation ==
Only two examples have survived: NS 174 which is still in original condition with open top and cab, and solid tyres. It is preserved at the London Bus Museum.

The other survivor, NS 1995, is in its final configuration and is part of the London Transport collection.
