= AEC 691T =

AEC experimental three-axle double deck trolleybus chassis

Overview
- Manufacturer: AEC
- Production: 1932

Body and chassis
- Doors: 1

The AEC 691T was a one-off experimental three-axle double deck trolleybus chassis manufactured by AEC. In 1932, the Underground Electric Railways Company of London commissioned AEC to build an extended version of the AEC 663T.

It was bodied by the London General Omnibus Company's Chiswick works entering service with London United Tramways in March 1933. It had a front mounted door just behind the front axle, as opposed to a rear platform. It operated demonstration trips in Bournemouth in 1933 and Brighton in 1936.
