= Pwllheli and Llanbedrog Tramway =

Horse tramway on the coast of Llŷn Peninsula, North West Wales

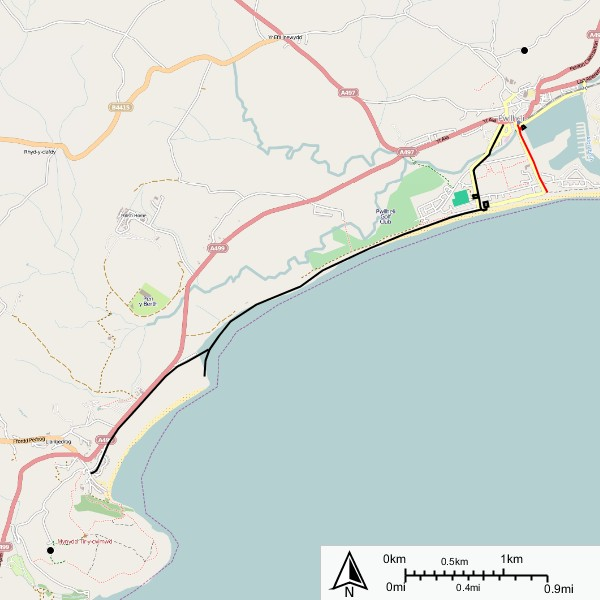
- Map of the Pwllheli Corporation Tramways (red line) and Pwllheli and Llanbedrog Tramways (black)

Operation
- Locale: Pwllheli, Llanbedrog
- Open: summer 1894 onwards - completed July 1897
- Close: 28 October 1927
- Status: Closed

Infrastructure
- Track gauge: 3 ft (914 mm)
- Propulsion system: Horse

Statistics
- Route length: 3.88 miles (6.24 km)

The Pwllheli and Llanbedrog Tramway was a 3 ft (914 mm) narrow gauge horse tramway on the coast of the Llŷn Peninsula in North West Wales, UK. It was originally constructed to convey building stone from Carreg-y-Defaid to Pwllheli's West End, with a second element to run between Pwllheli town centre and the West End resort on the seafront. The two were later connected, and extended to Llanbedrog in July 1897. The tramway was one of many developed by Solomon Andrews.

== History ==
The tramway was constructed shortly after Solomon Andrews purchased his land holdings in Pwllheli in 1893. It comprised a 2.5-mile stretch from the Carreg-y-defaid Quarry, southwest of Pwllheli, to West End, for the purposes of carrying stone for the construction of the seawall and The Parade. Construction began in May 1894, and the tramway opened to the quarry in the summer of 1894.

The tramway timetable of 1 August 1896 shows the service from West End starting at 9:00 am, running at 40-minute intervals until 8:20 pm. The fare was 2d (equivalent to £0.96 in 2025) and toast-rack and covered single-deck cars were in service. A horse-drawn omnibus provided a connection between West End and the town.

In the 12 months ending June 1895, 1332 wagon loads of stone were transported from the quarry. Unfortunately a storm in 1896 destroyed much of the line which had been laid along the beach. It was reconstructed further inland and opened shortly afterwards.

In September 1896, Andrews purchased an estate at Llanbedrog, including the large house of Glyn-y-weddw. The tramway was extended to Llanbedrog from July 1897. Glyn-y-weddw was opened as an art gallery and this attracted holiday makers from the West End resort to use the tramway.

By 1909 the service had been reduced considerably, with further reductions in 1911. During the National Eisteddfod held in Pwllheli in 1925, the tramway was packed to capacity.

On 28 October 1927 a storm over the north Wales area drove the sea inland over half a mile along the Embankment Road, and a long section of the tramway between Carreg-y-Defaid and Tyddyn-Called was swept away. The Andrews' Estate announced that the main section of the tramway would not reopen, although the Cardiff Road section within Pwllheli (between the West End and Ala Road) did run in summer 1928 . The tramway was offered to the local Corporation, but they declined the offer; as funds were not forthcoming for its reconstruction, it never reopened.

Although Kidner gave the gauge as 3 ft 6 in (1,067 mm) all other sources agree that it was 3 ft (914 mm). One car is preserved on a piece of track at Plas Glyn-y-weddw, Llanbedrog, although its gauge is 2 ft 7 in (787 mm).
