= Trolleybuses in Sydney =

Trolleybus system in Sydney, New South Wales

Sydney trolleybus systems
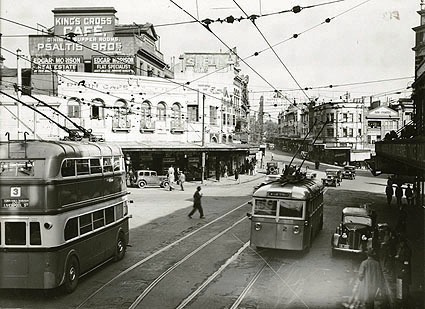
- Two trolleybuses in Kings Cross in 1934

Operation
- Locale: Sydney, New South Wales, Australia

Statistics
Eastern Suburbs era: 1934–1948
- Status: Closed
- Routes: 1
- Depot: Rushcutters Bay
- Stock: 5
Kogarah era: 1937–1959
- Status: Closed
- Routes: 1
- Depots: Ritchie Street, Sans Souci
- Stock: 21

The Sydney trolleybus system in New South Wales consisted of two unconnected lines in the Eastern Suburbs and St George areas of Sydney.

== History ==
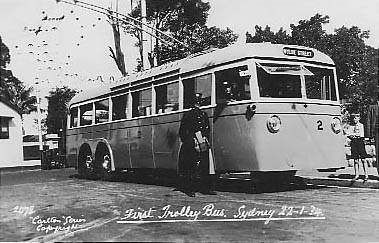
Trolleybus no 2 in January 1934

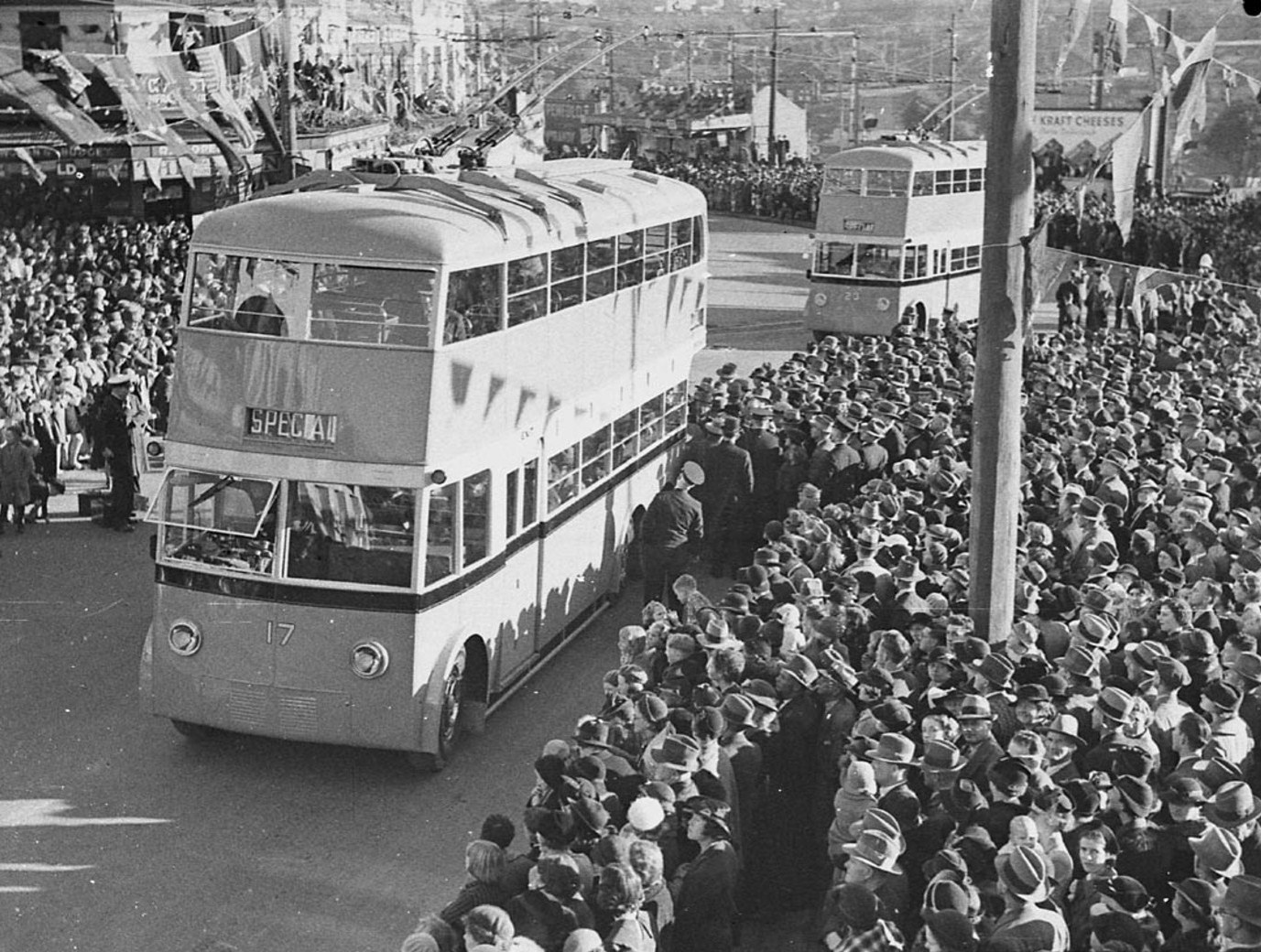
Opening of the Kogarah network on 3 July 1937

The first of these opened on 22 January 1934 when route 3 from Wylde Street, Potts Point to Town Hall station via Kings Cross and William Street. The route was temporarily converted to motor bus operation on 11 April 1948 while Liverpool Street was rebuilt. It was later decided not to reinstate the service.

On 3 July 1937, the second line opened from Rockdale station to Sans Souci via Kogarah station, Rocky Point Road and Dolls Point replacing the Kogarah to Sans Souci steam tramway. It closed on 29 August 1959.

== Services ==
Sydney's trolleybus routes were as follows:

Route	via	Opened	Closed
Town Hall station - Potts Point	William Street, Kings Cross	22 January 1934	10 April 1948
Rockdale station - Dolls Point	Kogarah station	3 June 1937	29 August 1959
Kogarah station - Sans Souci	Dolls Point	3 June 1937	29 August 1959

== Fleet ==
For the commencement of operations in the Eastern Suburbs, two single deck three-axle AEC 663Ts were purchased. One was bodied by Park Royal, London and the other by H McKenzie of White Bay. They were later joined by three AEC 761T double deck vehicles, one bodied by Park Royal and two locally by Syd Wood. For the commencement of the Kogarah services, 11 Leyland TTB4 and 10 AEC 664T double deck three-axle buses were bodied by Ritchie Brothers, Auburn. After the Eastern Suburbs line, the four surviving buses were transferred to Sans-Souci.

Image	Fleet numbers	Quantity	Chassis	Body	Configuration	In service
	1	1	AEC 663T	Park Royal	Three axle, single deck	1934-1956
	2–3	2	AEC 663T	H McKenzie	Three axle, single deck	1934-1956
	3	1	AEC 761T	Park Royal	Two axle, double deck	1934-1948
	4-5	2	AEC 761T	Syd Wood	Two axle, double deck	1936/37-1956
	6-16	11	Leyland TTB4	Ritchie Brothers	Three axle, double deck	1937-1959
	17-26	10	AEC 664T	Ritchie Brothers	Three axle, double deck	1937-1959

== Depots ==
The Eastern Suburbs buses were based at Rushcutters Bay Tram Depot with a turntable installed. The Kogarah services were based at the former Ritchie Street tram depot in Sans Souci. After the trolleybuses ceased in 1959, it was used by the New South Wales Police as a storage area for recovered stolen vehicles before passing to the Housing Commission.

== Legacy ==
The Powerhouse Museum has AEC 663T trolleybus number 1 in its collection while the Sydney Tramway Museum has AEC 664T number 19.
