= Star Omnibus Company =

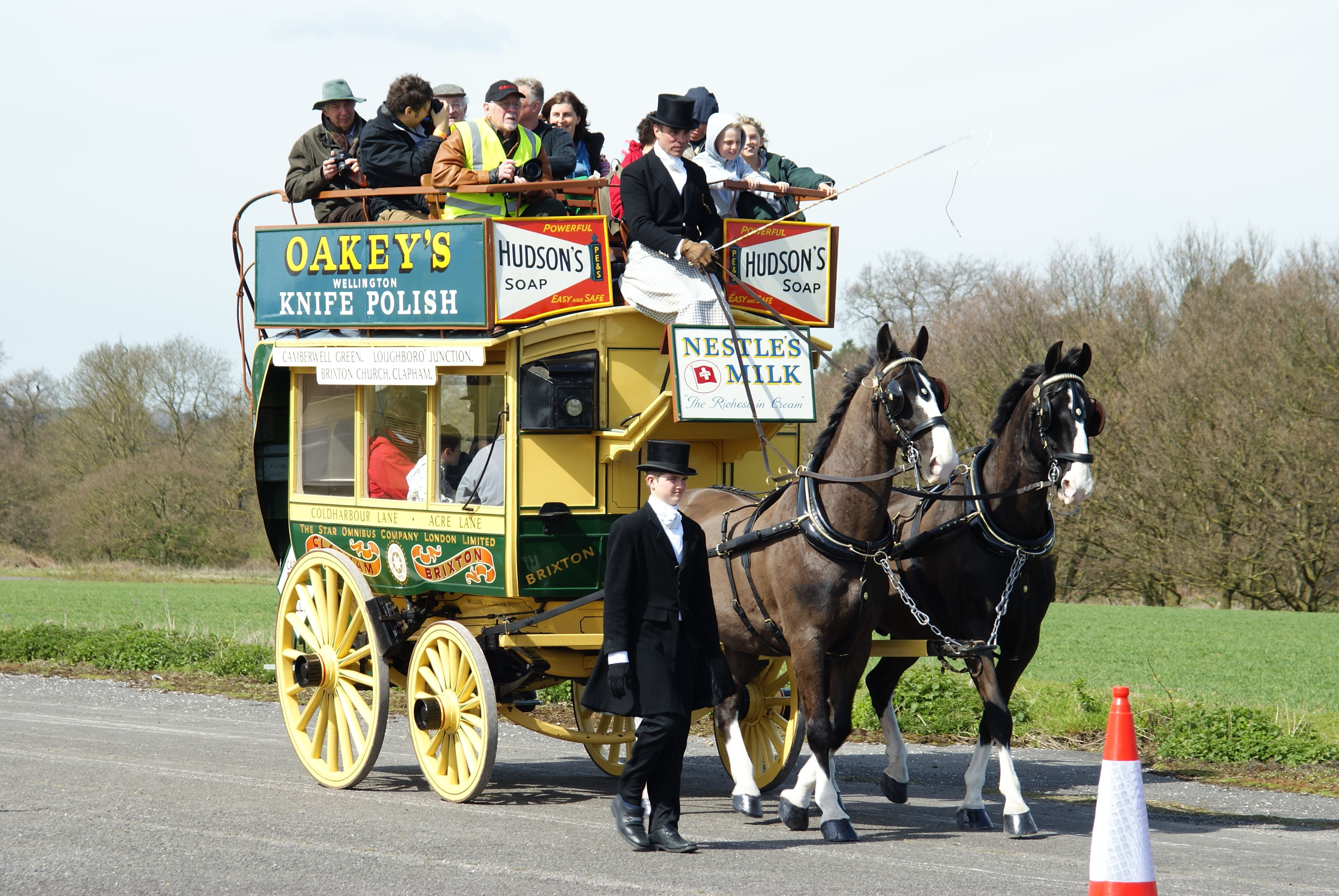
Star Omnibus Company 3-light 1890 Garden Seat omnibus at the 2010 Cobham bus rally

The Star Omnibus Company (and its predecessor the Andrews Star Omnibus Company) was a bus operator in London between 1892 and 1908.

== Overview ==
Solomon Andrews entered into an agreement with the London General Omnibus Company in 1886 to supply them with Andrews patent omnibuses. The Andrews patent omnibus represented an improvement in design over the vehicles previously used; by 1891, 26 omnibuses had been supplied.

== Andrews Star Omnibus Company ==
On 4 October 1892, a limited company was formed, Andrews Star Omnibus Company Limited, to take over the business of some omnibuses which had been operating since 1888 under the name of S. Andrews & Son. The directors were Solomon Andrews and his son, Francis Emile. The general manager was William Alexander Perry. The company was based at 31-47 New Kent Road, leased from Samuel Plimsoll.

In 1892 the routes of the company were as follows:

- 1 Elephant and Islington, 23 omnibuses
- 2 Camberwell and Kings Cross, 10 omnibuses
- 3 Edgware Road and Gower Street, 4 omnibuses
- 4 Camberwell and Victoria, 14 omnibuses

Later routes were added as follows:

- 5 Camberwell and Clapham, 8 January 1893
- 6 Hop Exchange and Gracechurch Street, 22 April 1893
- 7 Tower Bridge, July 1896
- 8 Peckham and Dulwich, July 1896
- 9 Farringdon Road
- 10 Walham Green and Wandsworth

== Star Omnibus Company ==
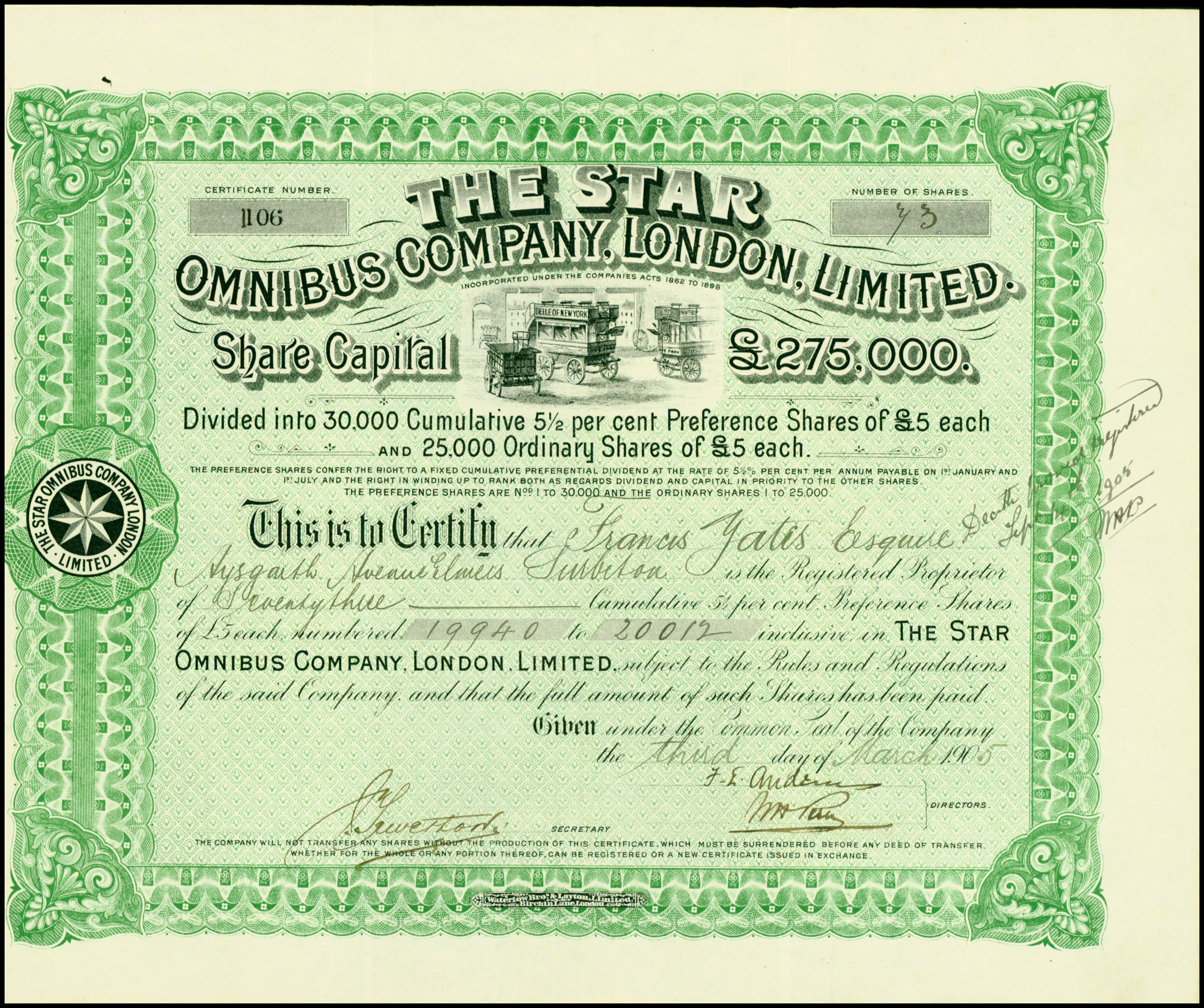
Share of the Star Omnibus Company, issued 3. March 1905

On 4 March 1899, the Star Omnibus Company (London) Limited was formed to take over the business of the Andrews Star Omnibus Company. The directors remained the same and William Alexander Perry became the managing director.

By 1900, the company had 196 omnibuses and 1,797 horses. The company continued to expand, and by 1902, they owned 246 omnibuses and 1,905 horses. In the same year, the company entered negotiations to take over the London General Omnibus Company for £222,750 (equivalent to £23,671,625 in 2025), but the deal was unsuccessful. The company started to experience financial difficulties, reportedly because of the increase in electric tramway services in London.

In 1905, the company purchased some motor buses, but these were unreliable and failed to deliver any profit for the company. The situation deteriorated, and the company withdrew the motor buses on 9 August 1907.

In line with most other omnibus operators in London at the time, the Star Omnibus Company was unable to withstand the competition from the London Underground and the tramway services, and profits continued to drop. The company was wound up on 21 February 1908.

== Surviving vehicles ==
When the company ceased trading, A.J. Perry, the brother of William Alexander Perry, purchased some of the company's vehicles; three of these survived to the present day.

=== 1875 Knifeboard Bus ===
This omnibus was owned by Bertram Mills Circus. It was operated on a service between Chessington South railway station and Chessington Zoo from 1944 to 1948. It was obtained by John Andrews, a descendant of Solomon Andrews, in 1963. It was renovated and took part in the George Shillibeer 150th anniversary in 1979. It was given to the London Bus Museum in 2007.

=== 1890 Three Light Garden Seat Bus ===
This omnibus was owned by Bertram Mills Circus. It was operated on a service between Chessington South railway station and Chessington Zoo from 1944 to 1948. It was sold first to Car Mart and then George Mathey, and it was later put on display at the Tyrwhitt-Drake Museum of Carriages at Maidstone. In 1967, it was purchased by Temple Smith of Chicago. Returning from the United States in 1989, it was restored and was later given to the London Bus Museum in 2007.

=== 1890 Four Light Garden Seat Bus ===
The omnibus passed into the ownership of Job Master Robert Barley, then Dollond & Aitchison. Bernard Mills bought it in 1948, with it later going to Tim Richards of Gawsworth Hall. It was renovated and took part in the George Shillibeer 150th anniversary in 1979 and operated a service to London Zoo. The Andrews family took it back to Cardiff in 1988 for restoration, and it was given to the London Bus Museum in 2007. It is on loan to the Beamish Museum.

== See also ==
- Buses in London
- Horse-drawn omnibus
