= Rushcutters Bay Tram Depot =

Former tram depot in Sydney, Australia

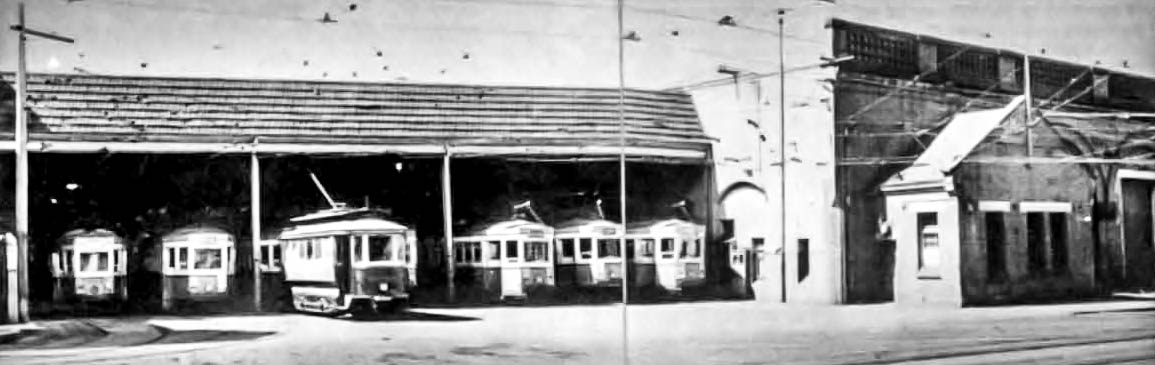
- Interactive map of Rushcutters Bay Tram Depot

Location
- Location: Rushcutters Bay
- Coordinates: 33°52′34″S 151°13′45″E

Characteristics
- Operator: New South Wales Tramways

History
- Opened: 4 October 1898
- Closed: 9 July 1960

Rushcutters Bay Tram Depot was part of the Sydney tram and trolleybus networks.

== History ==
Rushcutters Bay opened on 4 October 1898 serving the Watsons Bay route.

On the conversion to electric operation, the depot was extensively rebuilt in 1905 enlarging the tram shed from two roads to six. The depot was enlarged again around 1913 at the rear with an additional four roads.

As a former cable tram depot the layout included an attached winding house and boiler house. The winding house was built for the cable tramway from the foot of King Street to Ocean Street, Edgecliff. Modified design included:

- 10 tracks
- Plain front parapet
- Roof orientation to south

In January 1934, the former winding house was redeveloped as a trolleybus depot. The trolleybuses left in 1948. The depot closed on 9 July 1960 and was demolished.
