= Solomon Andrews (businessman) =

British entrepreneur (1835–1908)

- Born: 5 April 1835; Trowbridge, Wiltshire
- Died: 9 November 1908 (aged 73)

Solomon Andrews (5 April 1835 – 9 November 1908) was a British entrepreneur and head of the Solomon Andrews & Son bus and tram operating company, based in Cardiff.

== Family ==
Andrews was born in Trowbridge, Wiltshire, the son of John Andrews and Charlotte.

On 27 March 1855, Solomon married Mary Asher (20 August 1832 – 18 January 1870), daughter of John and Mary Asher, in Trinity Church, Trowbridge. There were five children from the marriage but only two survived infancy:

- Mary Lillah Asher Andrews (24 June 1857) married John McRae June 1880 in Cardiff and she died 13 Mar 1929
- Francis Emile Andrews (29 September 1858 – 30 November 1943)

His second wife, whom he married on 15 June 1870 in Knighton Parish Church, was Mary Jane Udell (born 2 March 1849) of Wrexham. There were six children from this marriage:

- Beatrice Andrews (6 April 1871)
- Herbert Fletcher Andrews (16 April 1873 – 8 June 1874)
- Florence Andrews
- May Andrews, married William Edgar Clogg
- Daisy Andrews
- Sydney Solomon Andrews (26 February 1885 – 1969)

== Career ==
By 1851 Andrews was living in Cardiff, at 17 Tredegar Street, and working as a baker and confectioner. The house was owned by George and Charlotte Asher, George being a baker and confectioner, so Solomon was presumably learning the trade.

On 24 November 1856, he leased a shop and house at 51 James Street.

On 17 December 1863, he obtained a licence to operate a horse-drawn cab from the new residential districts of Canton and Roath to Cardiff Docks. By 1865, he had eight cabs and he is thought to have been an omnibus proprietor by December 1866.

His business interests grew rapidly to include tramways, buses, draperies and collieries.

His son Francis Emile (1858–1943) joined the company and eventually became a partner, the business becoming known as Solomon Andrews and Son,

Andrews was a Conservative councillor on Cardiff Town Council, but lost his Roath ward seat at the 1887 elections.

== Transport ==
=== Buses ===
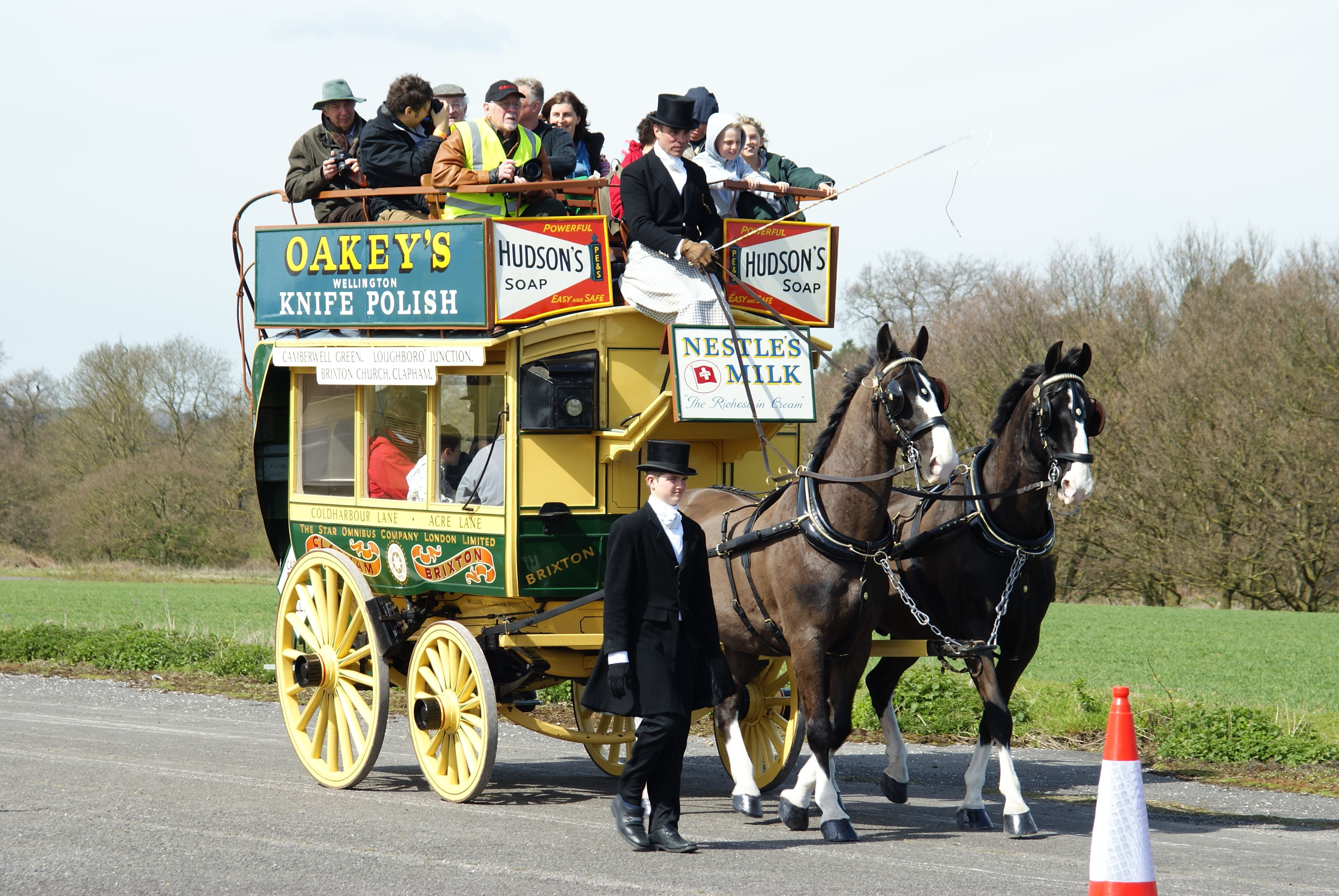
Star Omnibus Company horse bus at the 2010 Cobham bus rally

He was best known for the Andrews Star Omnibus Company and the Star Omnibus Company (London) which provided horse-drawn omnibus services in London. His company also ran buses in:

- Belfast
- Leicester
- Manchester
- Nottingham

=== Trams ===
- Cardiff
- Plymouth
- Portsmouth – Portsmouth Street Tramways Company
- Pwllheli – Pwllheli and Llanbedrog Tramway
- Arthog – Barmouth Junction and Arthog Tramway

== Property ==
=== Arthog ===
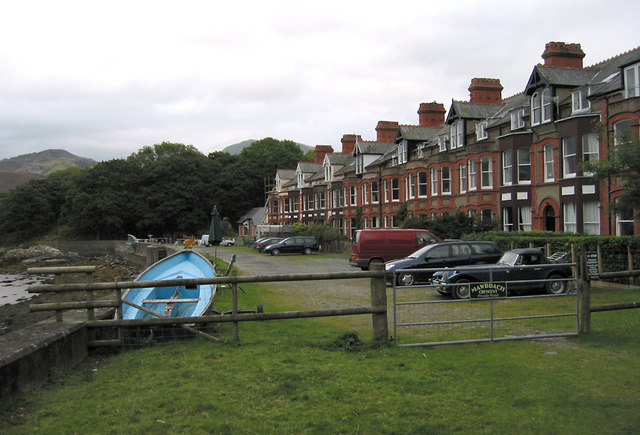
Mawddach Crescent

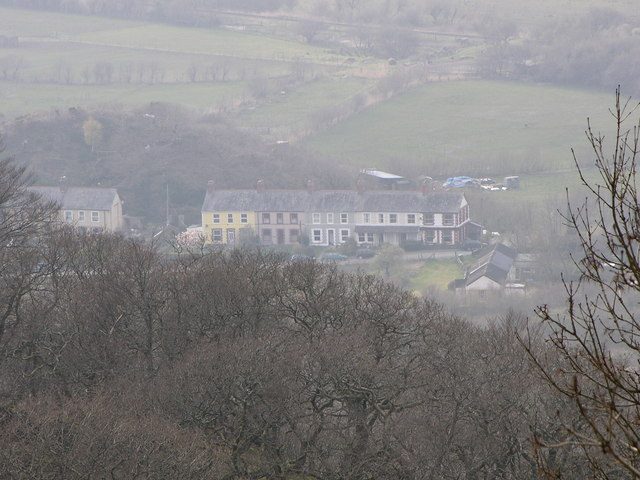
St Mary's Terrace, Arthog

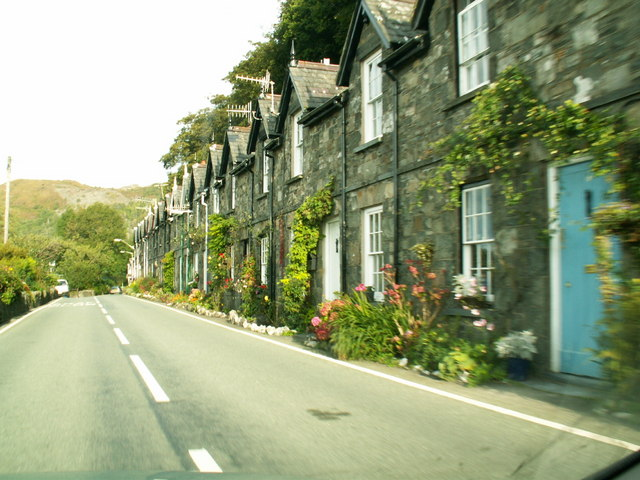
Arthog Terrace

In 1894 he purchased an area near Arthog consisting of several farms. He developed three terraces of houses, including St Mary's Terrace, Arthog Terrace, and Mawddach Crescent.

Mawddach Crescent was a row of properties overlooking the Mawddach estuary. The Crescent was connected to Barmouth Junction railway station by the short-lived Barmouth Junction and Arthog Tramway which he constructed. Andrews intended this to be the start of a purpose-built holiday resort but the surrounding land proved unsuitable for further construction. In 1941, during the Second World War, the Crescent was commandeered by the Royal Marines. It was renamed Camp Iceland and used as a training facility.

St Mary's Terrace in Arthog was also served by the Barmouth Junction and Arthog Tramway.

=== Aberdyfi ===
Andrews purchased land here and started work by fencing off some of it. However, this provoked trouble locally as public rights of way were affected, so no development ever took place. The land was later sold to the local authority.

=== Cardiff ===
Andrews undertook the rebuilding of 10 Bute Street (now Hayes Bridge Road) in 1871. This building was intended to be a grocery and confectionery shop and the headquarters of the Solomon Andrews and Son firm.

In the 1870s the expansion of his omnibus business led to the acquisition of new sites for depots. A freehold site was purchased at Severn Road, Canton, in 1875, and a manager's house, bus shed, stables and workshops was constructed.

In 1875, he also undertook work on a leasehold site at Glebe Street, Penarth. In 1880 he built a tram car depot at the junction of Ferry Road and Clive Street, Grangetown. This was for the Cardiff District and Penarth Harbour Tramway Company which opened in 1881.

Between 1881 and 1883 Andrews built five houses and shops, five cottages and Windsor Hall in Holmesdale Street, and some houses in Earl Street. Andrews Terrace in Ferry Road, consisting of sixteen houses and a coffee tavern, was also constructed at around the same time.

In 1884 he constructed the Market Buildings in St Mary Street, Cardiff at a cost of some £12,000. Sadly this building was destroyed by fire in June 1885, and it had been replaced by September 1886, the new building being constructed with eight-inch-thick concrete flooring to prevent further fires.

In 1885 in James Street he began construction of Mercantile Buildings which survived until demolished in the 1970s during a road widening scheme.

In 1888 Andrews completed the Imperial Buildings on St Mary Street, Cardiff, which became known as Barry's Hotel.

He also built two streets of housing in Llandaff Yard, now Llandaff North (Cymraeg: Ystum Taf), which were named Mary Street and Solomon Street (later renamed Andrews Road), and was involved in the construction of warehouses on the southern side of Penarth Road, as well as between Crawshay Lane (now Curran Road) and Trade Street. Terraced houses were built from the corner of Blaenclydach Street south-westwards along Penarth Road in 1891 to designs by the architect E.W.M. Corbett.

The Atlas, or Hayes, Building was erected around 1893 and this survived until destroyed by fire in 1958.

In 1894 Andrews constructed residential property from 75 to 113 Penarth Road, and the Andrews' Buildings on Queen Street to designs by the architect Edward Webb.

In 1895 the firm started building work in Penarth. Andrews' Buildings (Penarth), erected in 1896, consisted of five shops fronting Stanwell Road, a corner shop and two shops in Windsor Terrace. In 1897 the company built Lloyds Bank on the corner of Windsor Road and Albert Road to designs by the architect Edward Webb. This was followed by the Windsor Arcade, a row of shops on Windsor Road.

Around 1900 Metropole Buildings, 3–7 The Hayes, Cardiff was erected. This building was badly damaged by an air raid in the Second World War, but was reconstructed in 1959.

Numbers, 11, 12, and 13 Bute Street (now Hayes Bridge Road) were rebuilt in 1902 to designs by the architect Lennox Robertson. Andrews also constructed Pembroke Buildings on Pembroke Terrace in the same year, using the architect E.W.M. Corbett.

=== Pwllheli ===
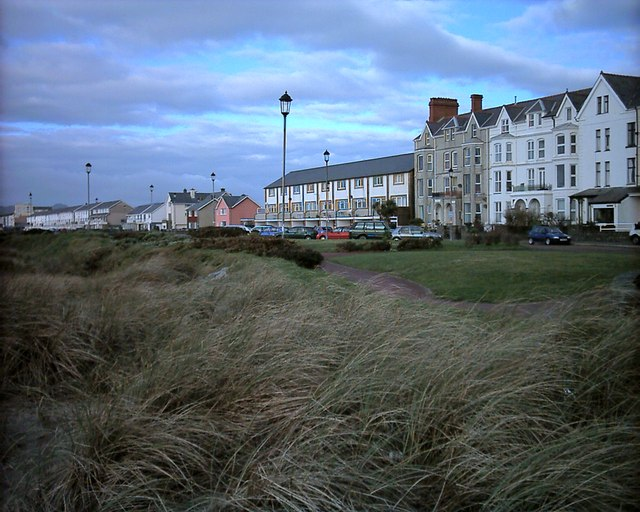
Pwllheli Promenade

In Pwllheli, Andrews was responsible for the development of the West End holiday resort, which included a promenade, housing, roads, a recreation ground, golf course, and the West End Hotel. The stone required to build the West End was provided by a local quarry that he leased at Carreg-y-defaid. The company constructed the Pwllheli and Llanbedrog Tramway, which carried the stone and passengers.

The West End Hotel was constructed first, along with large houses numbered 1–4 The Parade. The hotel was probably completed by 1895 and the houses in 1896. The construction was mostly in concrete, with the joinery being provided by his workshops in Cardiff and delivered to Pwllheli by rail.

Further building work was undertaken in 1897, when plans for nos 5–10 The Parade were approved by the council. Nos 11–16 followed quickly afterwards and all were completed by 1899.

Construction of housing and shops in Cardiff Road was undertaken between 1897 and 1901. A power station was erected next to the Assembly Rooms behind the West End Hotel, to provide electrical power for the West End Hotel.

== Retail ==
- David Evans. Department store in Swansea. Eventually owned by House of Fraser.
- David Evans and Co. Department store in Cardiff.
- Evan Jones and Co. Men's outfitter's in Cardiff.
