= AEC Sabre =

British bus chassis manufactured by AEC

Overview
- Manufacturer: AEC
- Production: 1968/70

Powertrain
- Engine: AEC 800

The AEC Sabre was a bus chassis manufactured by AEC. Launched in 1968, it was aimed at the touring and exports markets, however it was not a success, only four examples being sold. It was the last product introduced under the AEC badge.
