= Frank Searle (businessman) =

British transport engineer and businessman (1874–1948)

- Born: 1874; Greenwich, Kent
- Died: 4 April 1948, aged 73; Bournemouth, Hampshire
- Occupations: Engineer and Businessman
- Known for: M.D.Imperial Airways Limited designed the X-type bus designed the B-type bus
- Spouse(s): Charlotte Louise (d. 1944); Alice
- Children: Two daughters and two sons
- Parent(s): Henry and Elizabeth Searle

Frank Searle CBE, DSO, MIME (1874 – 4 April 1948) was a British transport entrepreneur, a locomotive engineer who moved from steam to omnibuses, the motor industry and airlines.

== Personal ==
Searle was born in late 1874 at Greenwich, (then in Kent), the son of draper Henry Searle and his wife Elizabeth (née Croaker). Searle appears in the 1881 census of Greenwich living with his parents and siblings at 282 New Cross Road in Deptford, he is described as a six-year-old scholar. In the 1891 census Searle is still at 282 New Cross Road with his siblings and he is described as a 16-year-old steam engine fitters apprentice.

In 1897 he married Charlotte Louise Soyer. Searle doesn't appear to be with his wife and family at the time of the 1901 census; his wife Charlotte is living at 112 Perry Hill in Lewisham with three children, Joan aged 2, Mary aged 1 and Geoffrey aged 2 months. In the 1911 census of Barnet, Hertfordshire, Searle and his wife, two daughters and a son Richard Soyer Searle are living in North Finchley, Searle is described as a mechanical engineer with the London and General Omnibus Company.

He remarried after Charlotte's death in 1944. Searle died aged 73 at his home in Bournemouth, Hampshire on 4 April 1948. His estate was valued for duty at £44,732 3s 3d.

Sometimes unkindly referred to as Uncle Frank and "a bus-company manager" Frank Searle died just too young to see the true advent of the era of mass air-travel—not yet on-stage but, as he rightly suspected, 'waiting in the wings'.

== Career ==
He was apprenticed to the Great Western Railway at Swindon Works and became a locomotive engineer but Searle soon recognized that the new petrol engines offering a higher power-to-weight ratio would be better than steam power.

=== Consultant motor engineer ===
Having seen that mechanized road transport would present better prospects for making money Searle entered business as a consultant motor engineer located in the West End of London. In 1905 he was in Paris, France where he represented the Turgan and Lacoste et Battman companies. He sold several Lacoste et Battman chassis to the London and District Motor Omnibus Company, which traded as "Arrow". The Lacoste et Battman buses were unreliable, and suffered frequent breakdowns. Searle was forced to abandon his consultancy when the final part of the order was cancelled due to the unreliability of the vehicles. Arrow took Searle on as a mechanic to keep the fleet of buses on the road. Searle patented and sold to LGOC for £1,000 an ingenious silent roller-chain constant-mesh gearbox.

=== Omnibuses ===
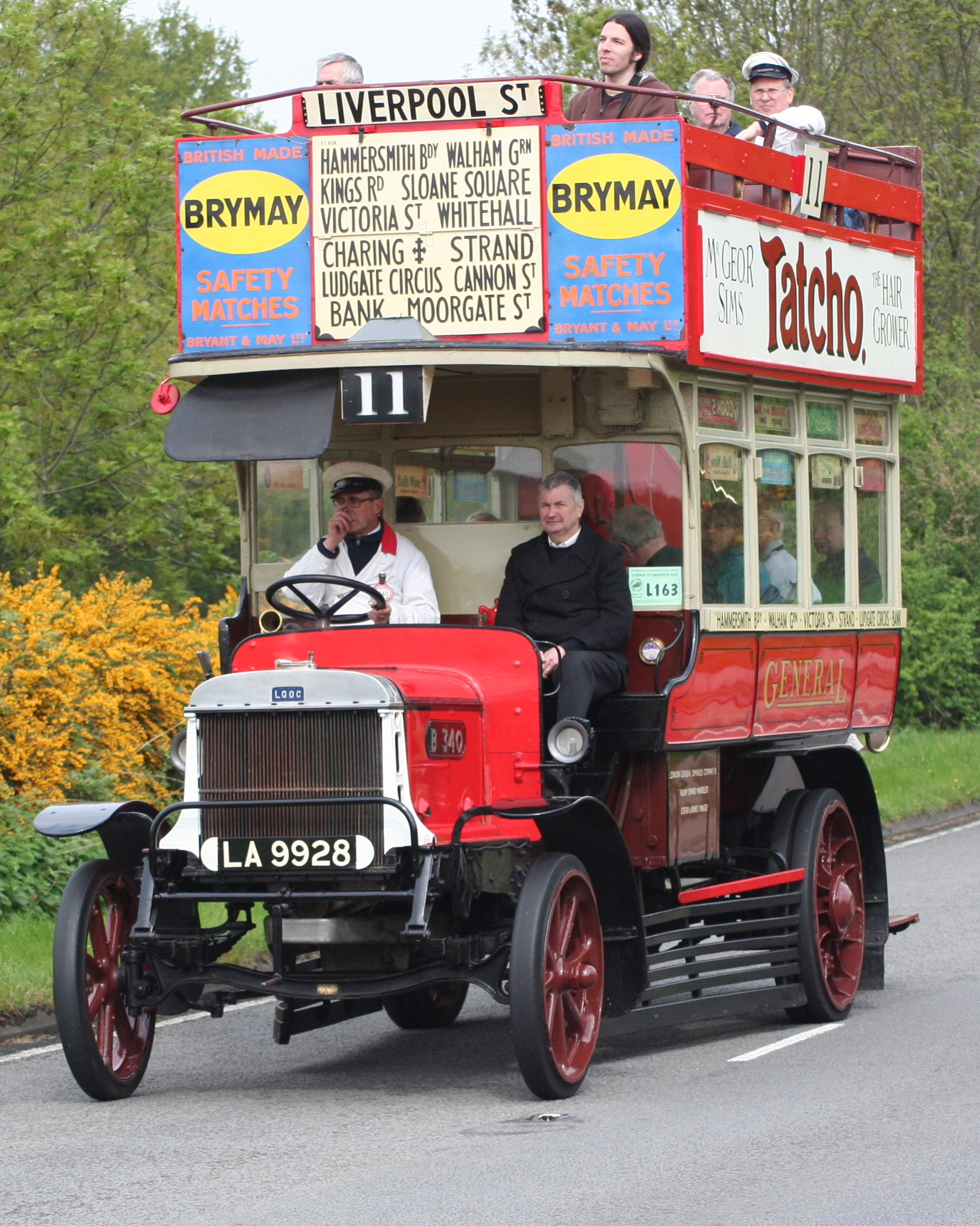
Frank Searle's improved B-type Omnibus entered service 18 October 1910

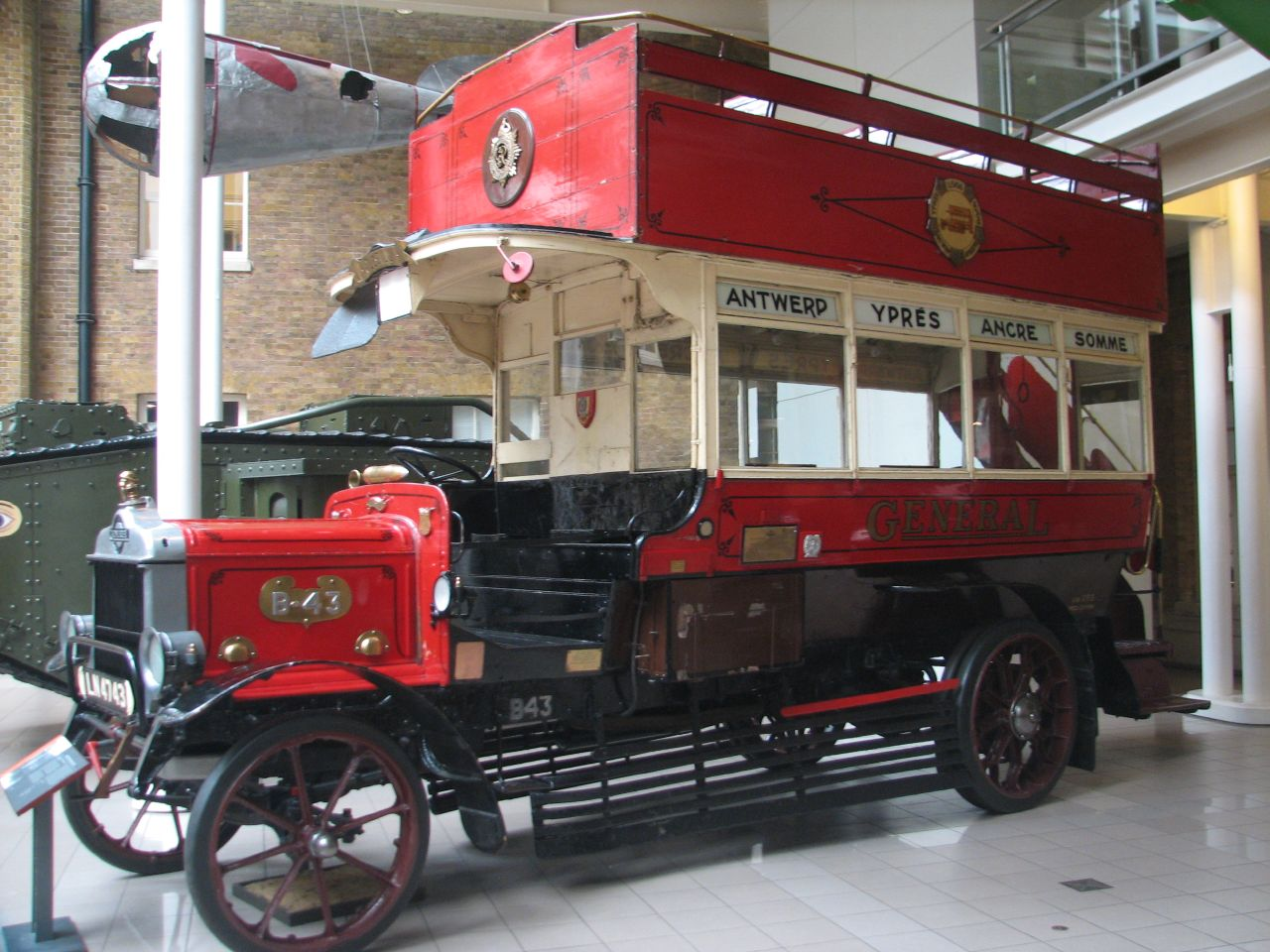
B-type Omnibus "Ole Bill" troop transport

In 1907, the London General Omnibus Company (LGOC) employed Searle as Superintendent at its Mortlake garage at an annual salary of £350. He was soon transferred to Cricklewood and on 18 May 1907 was appointed as Chief Motor Engineer at a salary of £450, later rising to £500. At the time, LGOC had a varied fleet of some 600 motor-buses all of which proved unable to cope with the stresses of operating in London's traffic. Searle persuaded LGOC to allow him to design a vehicle that was fit for the job. The best features of existing vehicles were taken and incorporated into the new design named the X-type bus. The prototype was completed on 12 August 1909 and, due to licensing delays, entered service in December. The next year Searle produced an improved design, the B-type bus, which entered service on 18 October 1910.

Rumours reached the LGOCs board that Searle had been offered a senior position with the Daimler Company's planned new motor-omnibus business. Searle's salary was increased from £1,000 to £1,250 on condition that he devote all his time to LGOC and took no outside employment. He prevaricated. Searle was ordered to appear before the board at their meeting on 4 May 1911. Offered a salary of £2,000 provided he signed a new contract there and then, Searle refused and was dismissed with three months' salary in lieu of notice. The details of his new position with Daimler's The Premier Motor Omnibus Company were announced in The Times on 6 May 1911. (Note: By the following Wednesday The Times was able to report 'widespread excitement' because of apparent difficulties with Daimler's Premier Motor Omnibus flotation (denied, in fact deferred and the proposal lost Daimler support) which had previously caused a 'severe fall' in the price of LGOC shares and (revived) rumours of LGOC involvement with a group of underground electric railways (confirmed). (The Latest Omnibus Development. The Position in the Stock Exchange. Features of the Past Account. The Times, Wednesday, 10 May 1911; pg. 19; Issue 39581) The following November the directors of LGOC announced the proposed amalgamation of their business with Metropolitan District Railway and Underground Electric Railways Company of London which was completed in April 1912.(London Traffic Amalgamation. A Combination of Omnibus And Railway Companies., £33,000,000 Capital Involved. The Times, Thursday, 2 Nov 1911; pg. 6; Issue 39732) The following February there was a new flotation, The Premier Omnibus Company, established to provide a motor-omnibus service in London and districts using "the well-known De Dion Bouton type omnibus". It was intended to manufacture buses at the former LGOC Walthamstow plant without link to Daimler other than a director being J S Critchley "formerly manager of The Daimler Company Limited". With Daimler since 1896 Critchley (1865–1944) was responsible for the creation of Daimler's Coventry factory.(The Premier Omnibus Company, Limited. CAPITAL-£100,000, Divided into 100,000 Shares of £1 each, Issue of 100,000 Shares Of £1 Each, Which Are Offered For Subscription at Par The Times, Thursday, 1 Feb 1912; pg. 16; Issue 39810)) This company, ultimately established without Searle or any tie to Daimler and later known as The London Premier Bus Company was wound up in 1917 having had a probable maximum fleet of six De Dion Boutons.

=== Inner tubes ===
In 1910 Searle had entered into business with a Mr F H Hall to form Hall & Searle Ltd and to develop and manufacture tyre inner tubes of a unique folded and strengthened design. In 1913, Hall and Searle was floated on the stock exchange as The Searle Unburstable Inner Tube Company.

=== BSA group – Daimler ===
==== Omnibuses and commercial vehicles ====
In May 1911 Daimler announced the flotation of shares in a new subsidiary to operate a London bus service, The Premier Motor Omnibus Company, to run Daimler buses with Searle "who has resigned his position with London General Omnibus for the purpose" as General Manager. Days later these plans were scrapped. It had been intended that this new London bus company would use Daimler's new KPL petrol-electric hybrid. Tilling-Stevens, a close associate of LGOC claimed a patent infringement and production was stopped. Twelve KPLs had been made.

Searle's new responsibility was to design the replacement product, effectively a B-Type with a Daimler motor. Then he had to sell this new vehicle and seems to have done well at this job. In June 1912 LGOC's former bus manufacturing operation was hived off into AEC and Searle is described as "manager of the Daimler Company Limited 'bus and commercial vehicle department" when visiting North America to "inspect the bus transportation system in the large American and Canadian cities and also to attend the trials of agricultural gasoline tractors at the Winnipeg Man. exhibition."

==== World War I ====
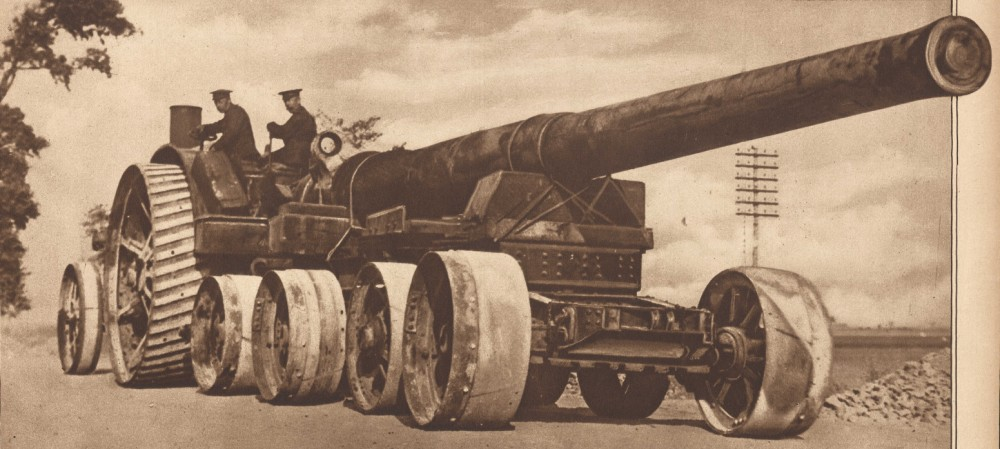
Daimler-Foster 105 hp tractor towing artillery on a trailer built by Fosters, Flanders 1917. Photo by Ernest Brooks.

Searle served in the First World War with the Machine Gun Corps (Heavy) which used Daimler-powered artillery tractors and in 1917 became the Tank Corps with Daimler-powered tanks.

He was temporarily promoted to major in November 1916. He reached the rank of lieutenant colonel. He was mentioned in despatches.

In 1918 Colonel Searle was awarded a Distinguished Service Order and he was made a CBE the following year.

==== Daimler Hire and Daimler Airway ====
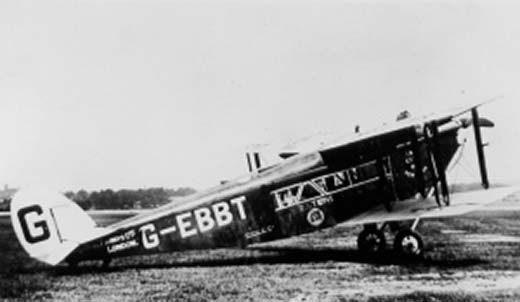
Daimler Airway De Havilland DH.34

Post-war, Searle returned to Daimler where he was made managing director of Daimler Hire Limited. In June 1919 he formed a new subsidiary Daimler Air Hire Limited. In February 1920, BSA bought George Holt Thomas's Airco, parent of Aircraft Transport and Travel (AT&T), and Searle was also appointed AT&Ts managing director. AT&T ran its last service on 17 December 1920. In January 1921 debt-swamped AT&T was liquidated and its assets, bought by Daimler Hire, were put with Daimler Air Hire to make Daimler Airway. Searle also became the managing director of Daimler Airway. Also in that year, Searle read a paper title "The Requirements and Difficulties of Air Transport" to the Royal Aeronautical Society.

=== Imperial Airways ===
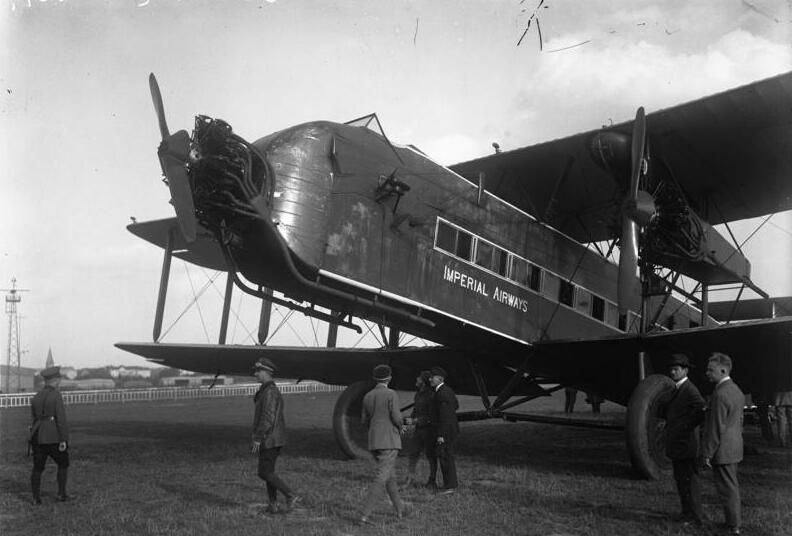
Imperial Airways Armstrong-Whitworth 154 Argosy

In 1924, Daimler Airway was merged with three other airlines, Handley Page Transport, Instone Airline and British Marine Air Navigation, to form Imperial Airways.

Searle was appointed managing director and appointed one of the eight members of the new board.

=== Rover ===
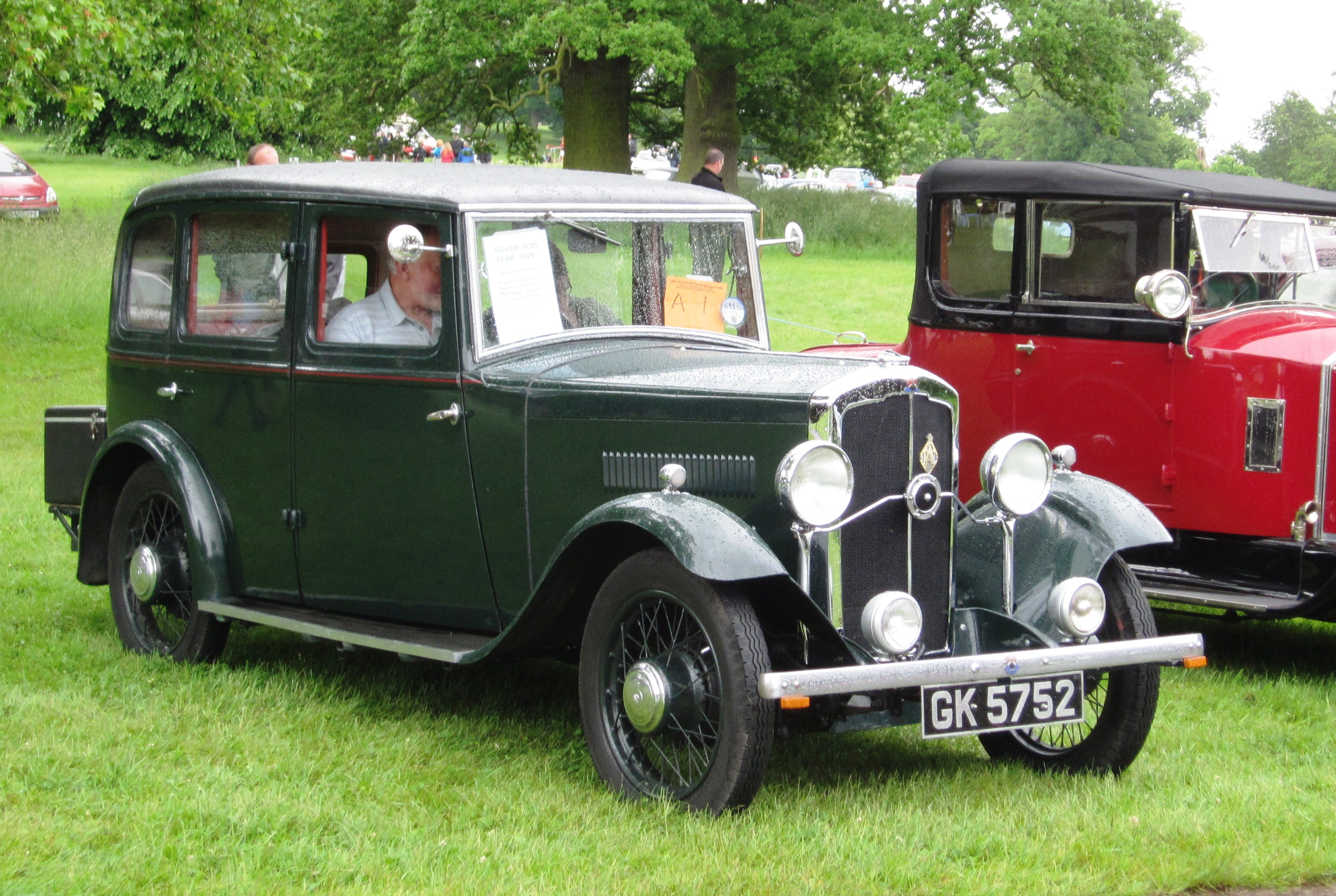
Rover 10/25 saloon 1929

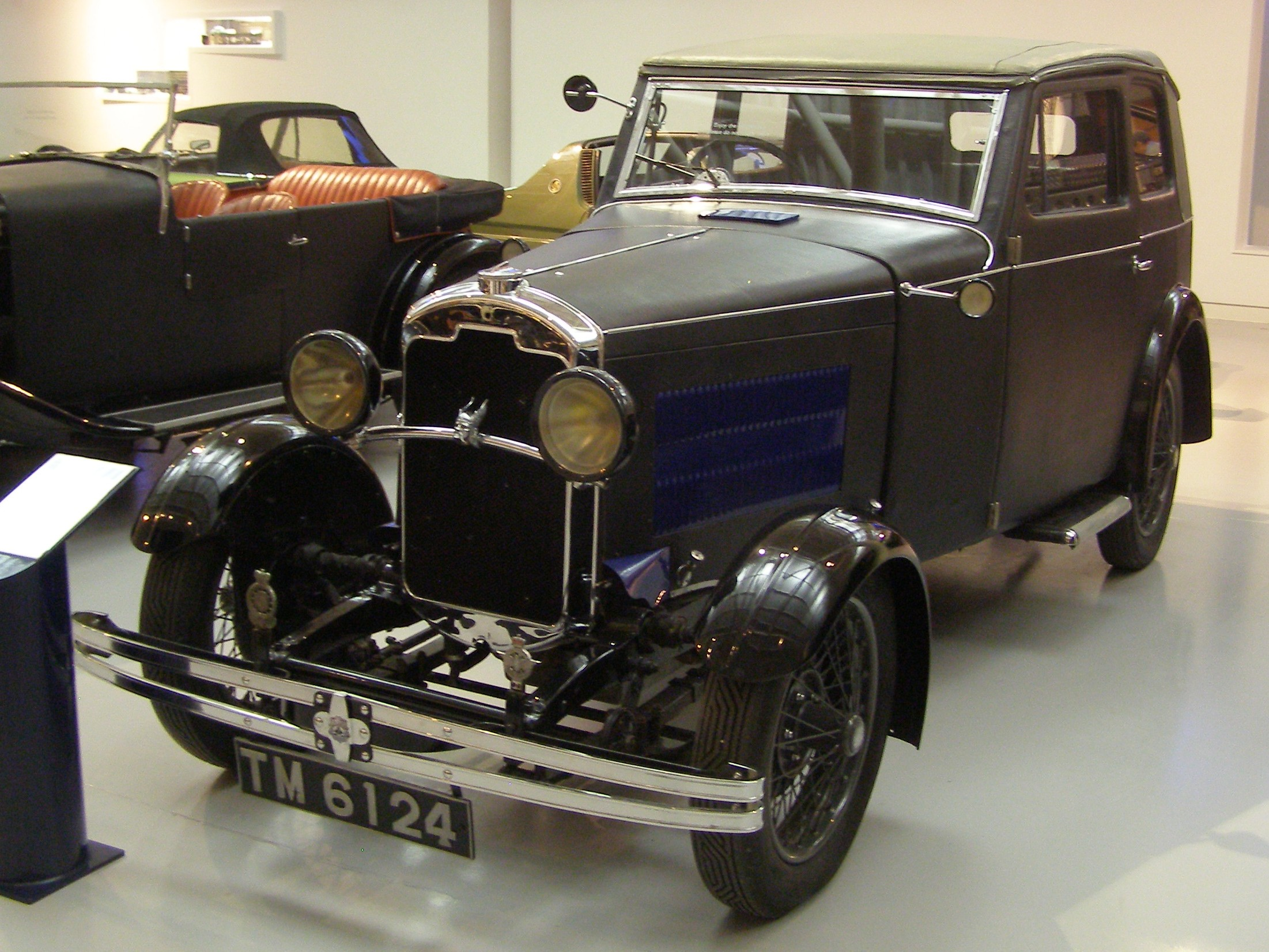
1929 Rover 2-litre Light Six the car that outran the Blue Train

In December 1928 the chairman of Rover advised shareholders that the accumulation of the substantial losses of the 1923–1928 years together with the costs of that year's reorganisation must be recognised by a reduction of 60% in the value of capital of the company.

Searle had been appointed managing director of Rover in May 1928 and soon achieved some success in restoring Rover's fortunes. On his recommendation Spencer Wilks was brought in from Hillman as general manager and appointed to the board in 1929. Spencer and Maurice Wilks were to stay with Rover into the 1960s.

January 1930 saw the Blue Train Races, Rover against Bentley then regular winners at the Le Mans 24 hours endurance race.

Next Searle split Midland Light Car Bodies from Rover in an effort to save money and instructed Robert Boyle and Maurice Wilks to design a new small car. This was the Rover Scarab with a rear-mounted V-twin-cylinder air-cooled engine eventually announced in 1931, a van version was shown at Olympia, but it did not go into production.

During his time at Rover, the Rover 10/25 was introduced, with bodies made by the Pressed Steel Company. This was the same body as used on the Hillman Minx. The company showed profits in the 1929 and 1930 years but with the economic downturn in 1931 Rover reported a loss of £77,529.

Searle left the board near the end of the calendar year, his work finished. leaving management in the control of Maurice Wilks with a new finance director, H E Graham.

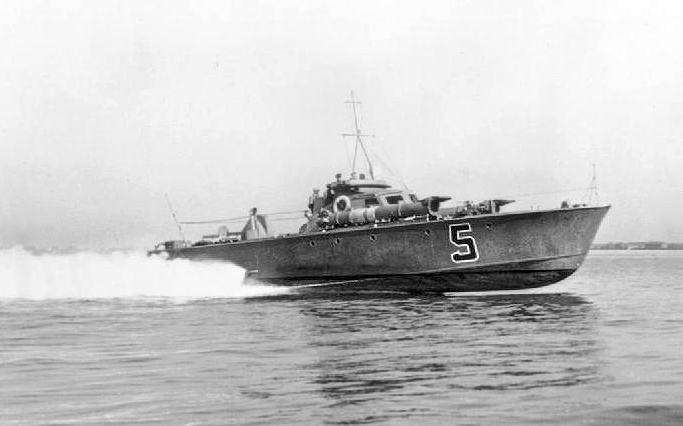
MTB at speed

=== Power boats ===
When the Second World War broke out, Searle came out of retirement to become managing director, and deputy chairman, of the British Power Boat Company. During the war the company made motor torpedo boats, gunboats and rescue vessels.
