= AEC Q-type =

British single- and double-decker bus type

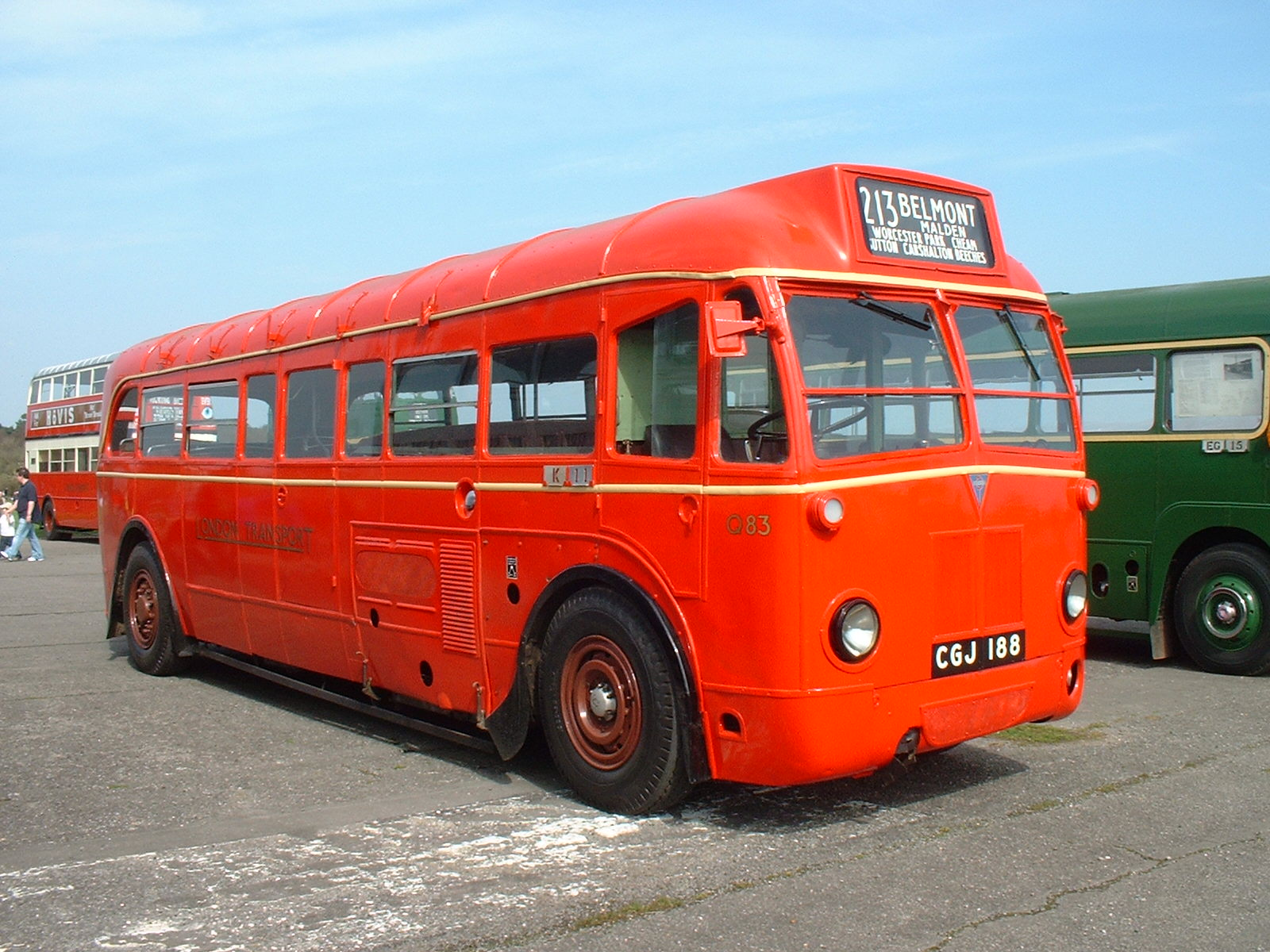
- AEC Q-type

Overview
- Manufacturer: AEC

Body and chassis
- Class: Commercial vehicle
- Body style: Single- or Double-decker
- Doors: 1 door
- Floor type: Step entrance

The AEC Q-type is an AEC-built, side-mounted-engine, single- and double-decker bus that was launched in 1932.

It was designed by G. J. Rackham, an employee of the American firm Yellow Coach from 1922 to 1926. It was on a visit to America in the late 1920s that Rackham noted the success of the 1927 Fageol Twin Coach which had won large sales to American operators. The result was Rackham returned to the AEC works in Southall with the idea of implementing the American practice of side-mounted engines in British bus production.

== Design ==
Although based on the Twin Coach, the Q had many differences as compared to it, the most noticeable being whilst the Twin Coach had two engines, hence the name, the AEC Q only had one. This overcame the many complications arising from the need for a second engine.

The London General Omnibus Company received the first Q-type vehicle with a crash gearbox, although all subsequent vehicles had the pre-select version. The engine was available in either petrol or diesel versions and was located longitudinally behind the front axle, intended to be hidden by the staircase in the double-decker version. In order to fit into the space, the engine was tilted to one side and the crankshaft rotated anti-clockwise. This allowed the driver's cab to be located on the front overhang, with the entrance opposite, even though some body builders didn't use this facility and had a centre entrance. Its modern, full-frontal design, made it look very similar to buses built in the 1950s and 1960s.

== History ==
The Q failed to attract the attention of the British operators and failed to find a market in the UK, unlike Fageol in the US. One of the reasons was the Q's susceptibility to problems, the most worrying being that the carburettors on the petrol-engined models caught fire. The recommended solution was just as worrying ... increasing the revs until the fire went out! However, the vehicle was just too revolutionary for the conservative-minded bus industry, with the result was that the Q did not obtain the popularity of the other AEC models, so the project was dropped, last appearing in the 1937 catalogue.

London Transport found the single-deck model sufficiently useful to purchase over 200 of the diesel-engined version as its first standard bus for Country Bus services. They had centre entrances with sliding passenger doors fitted. They led full service lives.

Five examples of the AEC 761T trolleybus version were also built.
