= AEC 761T =

British two-axle double deck trolleybus chassis

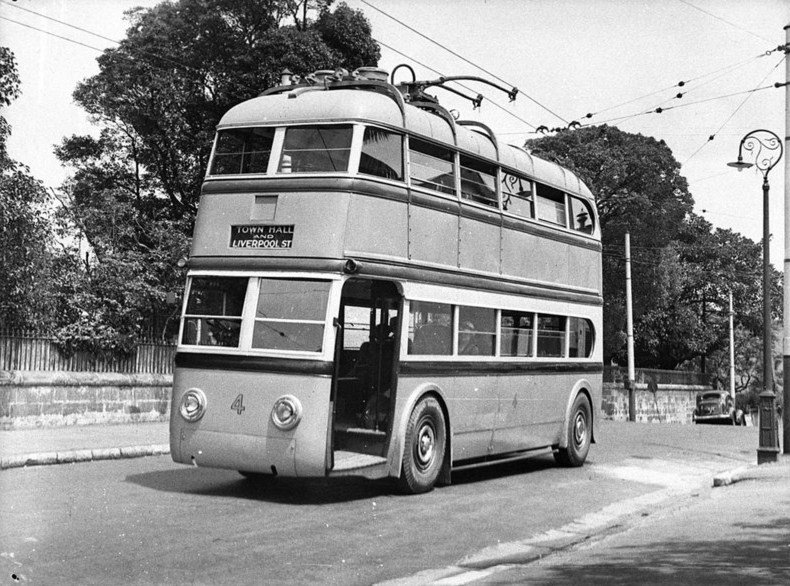
- AEC 761T in Sydney, Australia

Overview
- Manufacturer: AEC
- Production: 1933/34

Body and chassis
- Doors: 1
- Related: AEC Q-type

The AEC 761T was a two-axle double deck trolleybus chassis manufactured by AEC. Based on the AEC Q-type bus chassis, only five were built; a demonstrator that was later purchased by Bradford, one in Southend-on-Sea and three exported to Sydney, Australia.
