= Frank Searle (cryptozoologist) =

British cryptozoologist

- Born: 8 March 1921; Staines-upon-Thames, England
- Died: 26 March 2005 (aged 84); Fleetwood, Lancashire, England
- Occupation: Cryptozoologist

Eric Frank Searle (18 March 1921 – 26 March 2005) was a British cryptozoologist who spent 14 years living by Loch Ness maintaining a full-time watch and taking photographs of what he claimed were the Loch Ness Monster.

== Life ==
Searle was born in Staines, on 18 March 1921. After leaving school, he joined the British Army and served in several places during the Second World War, receiving the DCM and rising to sergeant. Afterwards he served in Yugoslavia, Malaya and Korea becoming captain. He was invalided out in 1957, having lost part of his leg. He worked as a supervisor in a London fruiterers. In 1969, he gave up work and lived full time on the shores of Loch Ness until 1983 when he moved to Fleetwood.

In 1998, he had a stroke which confined him to a wheelchair.

He never married and had no known heirs when he died in Fleetwood on 26 March 2005.

== Loch Ness ==
In 1957, he bought a book about the Loch Ness Monster, More than a Legend by Constance Whyte, which so impressed him that he camped by the loch during his summer holidays for the following years, hoping for a sighting, being rewarded by seeing what he was sure was the monster in 1965. On 16 June 1969, he gave up his job and pitched a tent by the loch for a year-round vigil, which he maintained in a series of tents and caravans, until 1983, when he left abruptly without telling anyone.

On 30 November 1969, he had his second sighting from a boat, as what he described as "a great black shape broke the surface".

On 1 November 1972, the Scottish newspaper the Daily Record had a front-page picture headed 'Nessie the most amazing pictures ever seen', a picture of an object on the water provided by Searle. This was the first of about twenty pictures which he sold to the press during his time at the loch, becoming a minor celebrity with many visitors to his campsite and interviews with the media.

== Publications ==
- In 1975 he published the book Nessie: Seven Years in Search of the Monster, describing his work.
- From 1976 to 1983, he published a series of newsletters recording sightings and other happenings around the loch.
- In 1983, a booklet Loch Ness Investigation - what really happened was privately printed and distributed. This contains considerable criticism of people and organisations which been publicly associated with searching for the monster, and which he said had been cut from his book by the publisher without his agreement.

== Legacy ==
Searle was the subject of a Channel 4 documentary entitled The Man Who Captured Nessie in 2005.

His photographs have been dismissed as either inanimate objects or fakes, but he is considered to have been a genuine investigator.
