= LGOC X-type =

Early model London double-decker bus

Overview
- Manufacturer: London General Omnibus Co. Ltd (LGOC); AEC later

Body and chassis
- Doors: 1 door
- Floor type: Step entrance

The LGOC X-type is an early model of London double-decker bus.

== History ==
The X-type was the first bus built by London General Omnibus Co. Ltd (LGOC). The manufacturing part of LGOC became AEC in June 1912.

In 1908 LGOC merged with its two main rivals, London Motor Omnibus Co Ltd (commonly trading as "Vanguard"), and London Road Car Co. Ltd (using the "Union Jack" fleetname). The combined company, using the "General" fleetname, had a fleet of 885 motor buses, although horse-drawn omnibuses remained common. The Chief Motor Engineer, Frank Searle, proposed the LGOC build its own vehicles in the former Vanguard premises at Blackhorse Road, Walthamstow, and designs for an initial 20 were put underway.

The prototype vehicle was completed on 12 August 1909 and received its police licence just before Christmas. Amalgamating the best features of previous designs, it was rudely referred to as the Daimler-Wolseley-Straker. The bus was of normal control layout, with the driver behind the engine. The bodywork resembled that of the last horse-drawn omnibus designs, with an open top deck and seats that ran longitudinally along the sides.

A total of 60 X-type buses were built, together with one lorry. Production ended in December 1909, and was followed by the B-type.
