= London General Omnibus Company =

Principal bus operator in London between 1855 and 1933

- The LGOC's winged wheel logo, which inspired the TfL roundel
- Formerly: Compagnie Generale des Omnibus de Londres
- Parent: Underground Electric Railways Company of London (1912–1933)
- Founded: 1855; 171 years ago
- Service area: London
- Service type: Omnibus (1855–1911); Motor bus (1902–)

The London General Omnibus Company or LGOC, was the principal bus operator in London between 1855 and 1933. It was also, for a short period between 1909 and 1912, a motor bus manufacturer.

== Overview ==
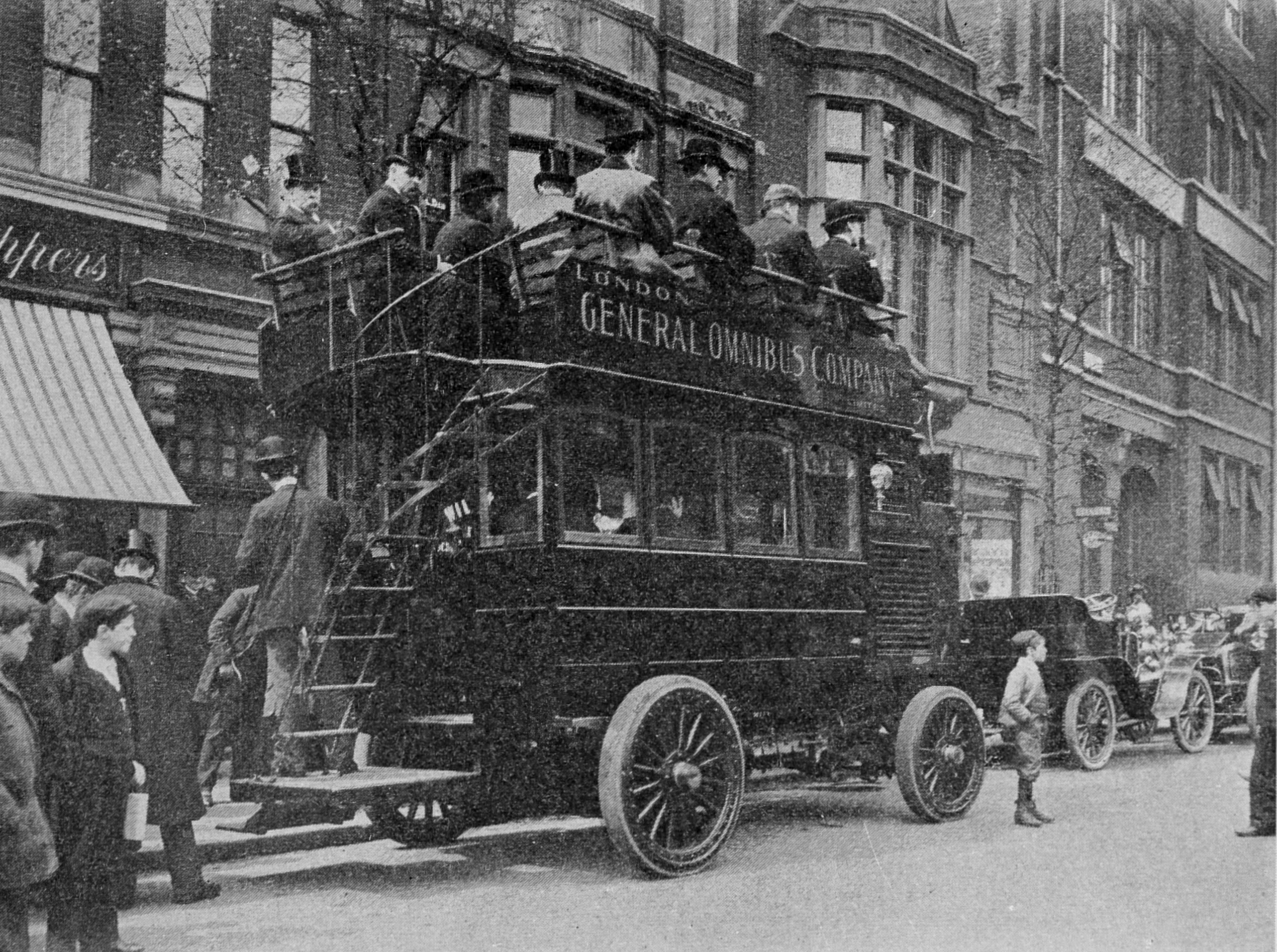
Experimental Fischer petrol-electric bus, 1903.

The London General Omnibus Company was founded in 1855 to amalgamate and regulate the many independent horse-drawn omnibus services then operating in London. Originally an Anglo-French enterprise, also known as the Compagnie Generale des Omnibus de Londres, the LGOC soon became the largest omnibus operator in London. It bought out hundreds of independently owned buses and established a consistent level of service for its fleet. Within a year, the LGOC controlled 600 of London's 810 omnibuses.

Under its chairman Sir John Pound, in 1902 it looked at an option to purchase a competitor, the Star Omnibus Company, but it was unable to complete negotiations. LGOC began using motor omnibuses in 1902, and the last LGOC horse-drawn bus ran on 25 October 1911.

In 1908 the LGOC bought the Road Car Company, the Vanguard Company, and its other main rivals, thereby gaining a virtual monopoly in London.

The merger of these three companies (the Road Car Company was also known as Union Jack owing to its habit of flying the British flag on its vehicles) gave the new and enlarged LGOC the most experienced operating and engineering personnel of any operator - and perhaps manufacturer - in the country at the time.

The LGOC absorbed the Great Eastern London Motor Omnibus Company (previously known as London Motor Omnibus Company) in March 1911.

In 1912, the Underground Group, which owned most of the London Underground, bought the LGOC. This followed the start of negotiations between the two companies in 1910 that finally led to the publication of an official statement regarding the proposed terms of the merger on 19 January 1912. By early February 1912 the majority of shareholders in the LGOC had accepted the terms. This in time allowed increasing co-ordination between LGOC bus and tube services, with integrated fares, such as was seen with the opening of the bus station adjacent to Hammersmith station in April 1914.

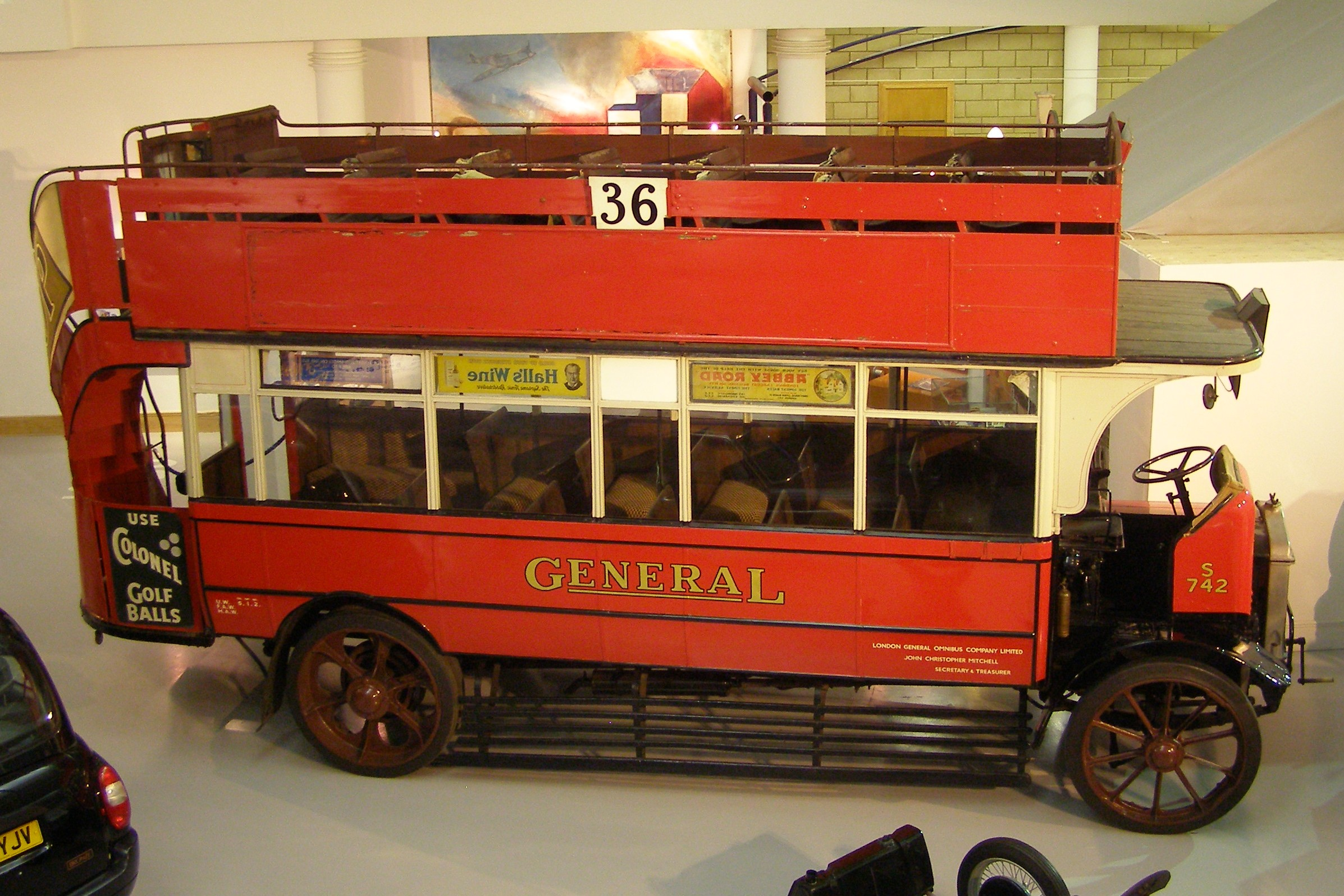
S742, a preserved London General liveried bus

In 1933, the LGOC, along with the rest of the Underground Group, became part of the new London Passenger Transport Board. The name London General fell into disuse, and London Transport instead became synonymous with the red London bus.

== Manufacturing ==
LGOC began producing motor omnibuses for its own use in 1909 at works established in premises inherited from Vanguard at Blackhorse Lane, Walthamstow, London. The first model built was the LGOC X-type, which was designed by Frank Searle, LGOC's chief engineer. The X-type was followed by the LGOC B-type, from the same designer.

After the Underground Group's acquisition of the LGOC in 1912, the bus manufacturing elements of the LGOC were split out to create the Associated Equipment Company (AEC).

== Rebirth of the name ==
In the privatisation of London bus services in the 1990s, London Transport created a series of shadow bus operating companies with names of geographic or historic significance, and one of these was christened London General in honour of the LGOC. The new London General was initially privatised by management buy-out, and acquired by the Go-Ahead Group in 1996.

== Popular culture ==
“Did you see that bus parked outside the theatre as you came in? It had ‘Private’ on the front. Looked very lonely, it did. I can remember when it was a General!” -Michael Flanders, "A Transport of Delight," At The Drop Of A Hat, 1957

The London General Omnibus Company was featured in the opening ceremony of the 2012 Summer Olympics in London. Isambard Kingdom Brunel, played by actor Kenneth Branagh, was depicted arriving in a green horse-drawn London General Omnibus Company Limited bus at the start of the ceremony.

In the video game Assassin's Creed Syndicate published by Ubisoft in 2015, assassins come to the aid of Edward Hodson Bayley and company, who was said to be responsible for the founding of the united London General Omnibus Company in the storyline campaign, supplying omnibuses for the city.

== Gallery ==
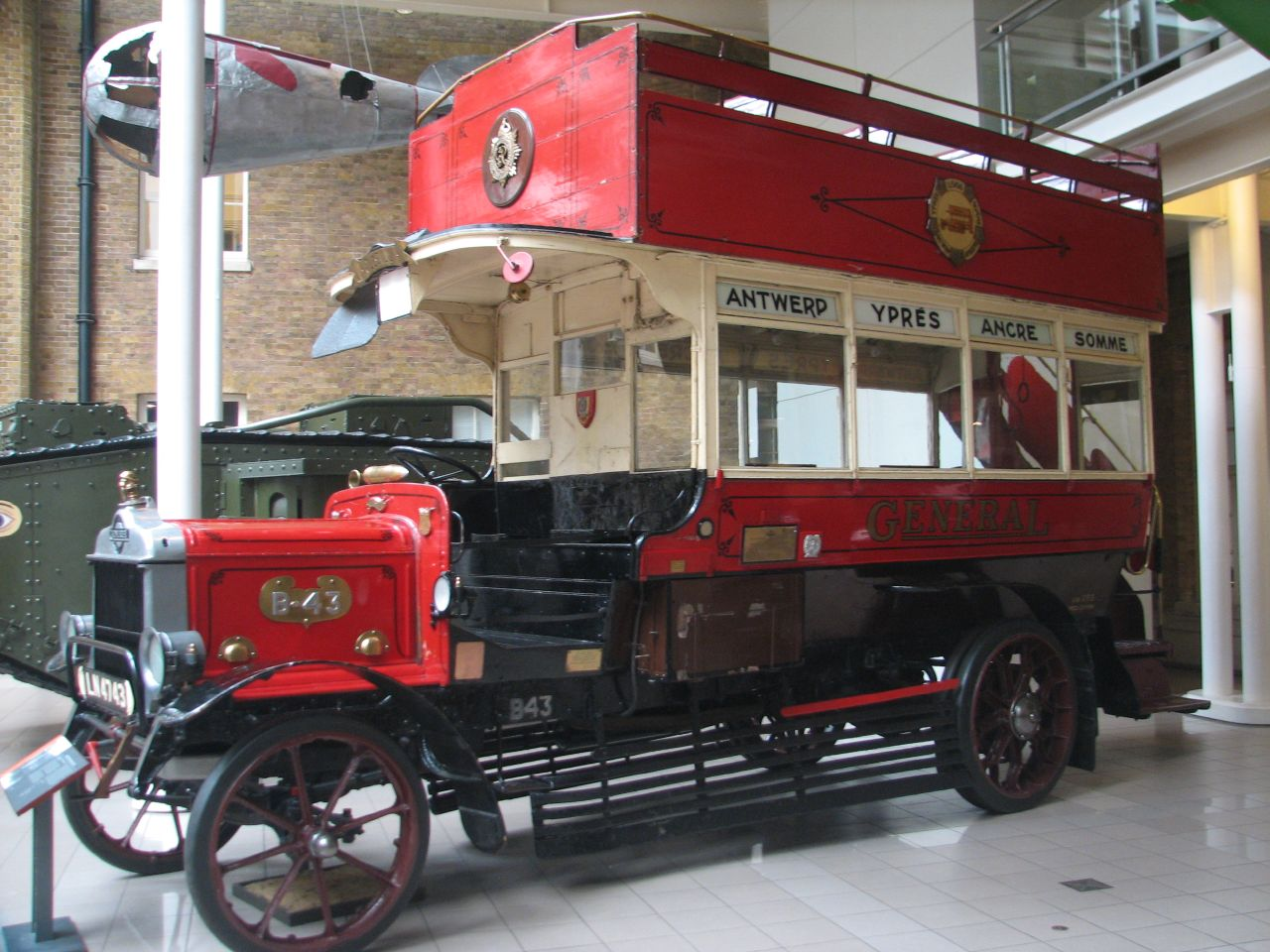
LGOC B-type

== See also ==
- Buses in London
