= Rede Nacional de Expressos =

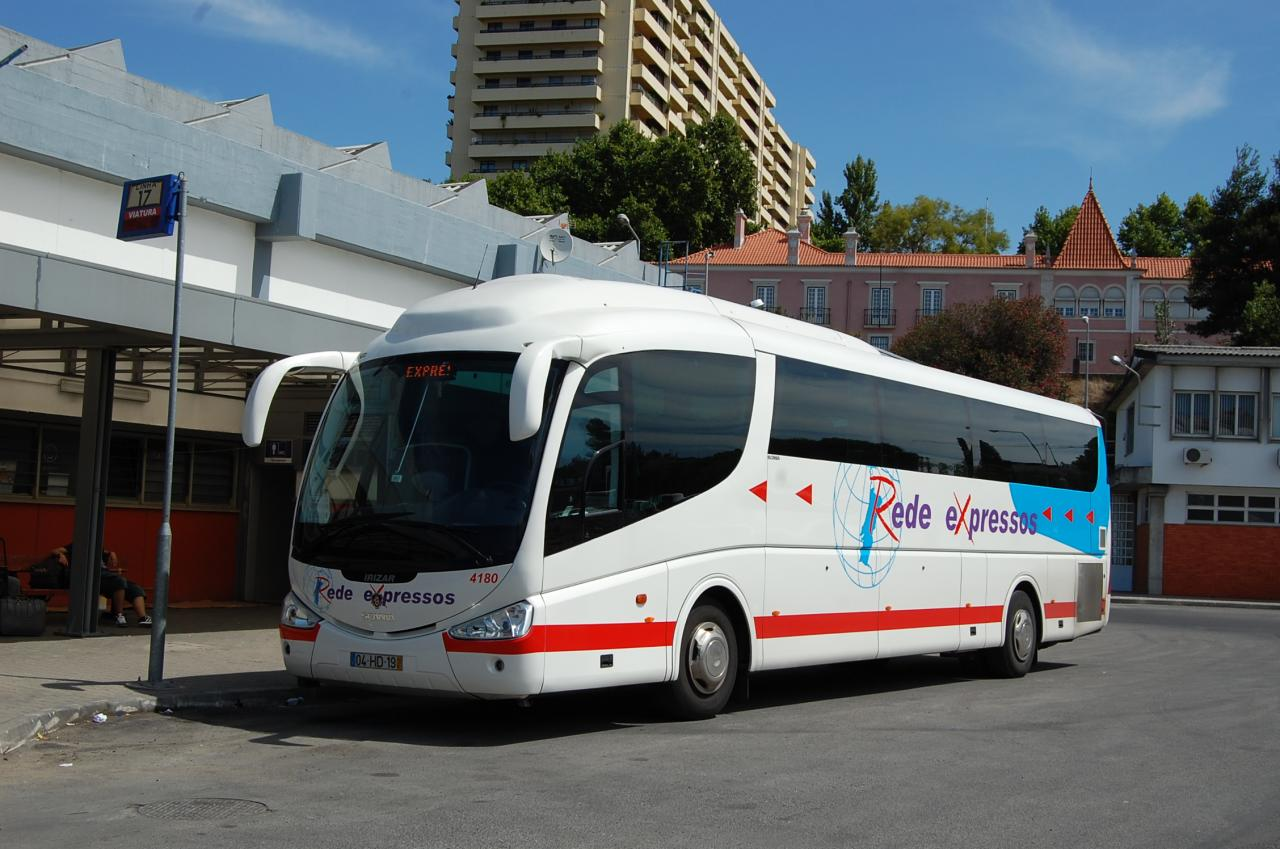

Rede Nacional de Expressos (National Express Network) is a national express coach network in Portugal. The network, based in Lisbon, was founded in 1995. The network is composed of several bus operating companies: Transdev Portugal, SA; Rodoviária do Tejo SA; Barraqueiro Transportes, SA (including Rodoviária do Alentejo, SA; Eva Transportes, SA) among others; Rodoviária da Beira Interior, SA among others. The network is the spiritual successor of the intercity express services created in the late 1970s by Rodoviária Nacional. Rede Nacional de Expressos doesn't own coaches, as all the fleet belongs to the company's shareholders, despite most of buses associated to Rede Expressos use the Rede Expressos brand livery.

Rede Nacional de Expressos was created in 1995, with the primary mission of ensuring passenger transport and package delivery between major cities and regions of Portugal. Nowadays, based on a dense network spread over 42,000 km, Rede Nacional de Expressos connects several hundred destinations, several times per day.

Rede Nacional Expressos buses are equipped with free wifi.
