= Associated Equipment Company =

British vehicle manufacturer

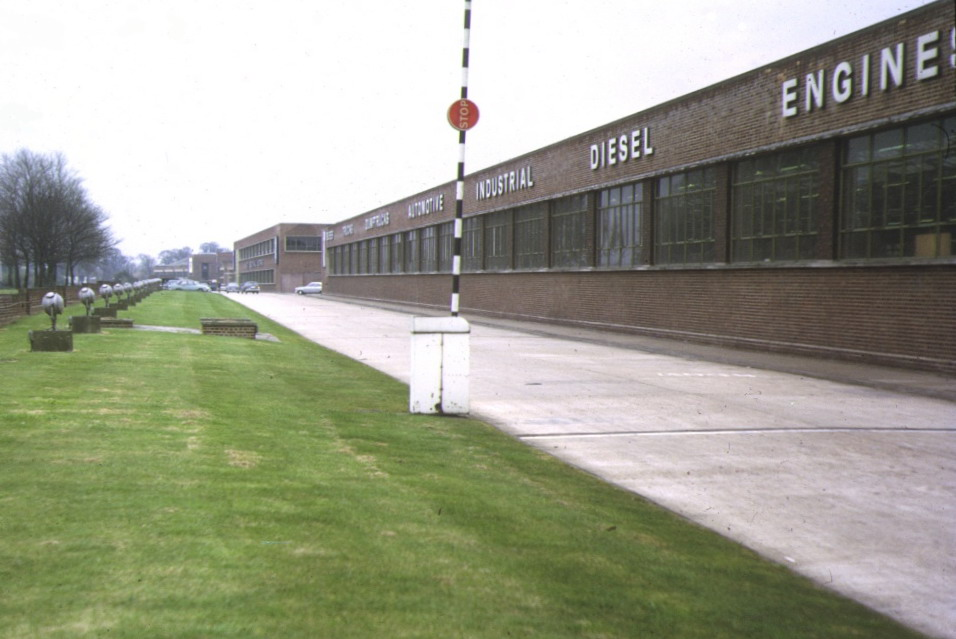
- AEC Southall Works in 1973
- Industry: Automotive
- Founded: 1912; 114 years ago
- Defunct: 1979; 47 years ago
- Fate: Closed down by British Leyland
- Headquarters: Southall, England
- Products: Lorries, buses, motorcoaches
- Parent: British Leyland (1968–1979)

Associated Equipment Company (AEC) was a British vehicle manufacturer that built buses, motorcoaches and trucks from 1912 until 1979. The name Associated Equipment Company was hardly ever used; instead, it traded under the AEC and ACLO brands. During World War One, AEC was the most prolific British lorry manufacturer, after building London's buses before the war.

== History ==
=== Inception ===
The London General Omnibus Company (LGOC) was founded in 1855 to amalgamate and regulate the horse-drawn omnibus services then operating in London. The company began producing motor omnibuses for its own use in 1909 with the X-type designed by its chief motor engineer, Frank Searle, at works in Blackhorse Lane, Walthamstow. The X-type was followed by Searle's B-type design, considered to be one of the first mass-produced commercial vehicles.

In 1912, LGOC was taken over by the Underground Group of companies, which at that time owned most of the London Underground, and extensive tram operations. As part of the reorganisation following the takeover, a separate concern was set up for the bus manufacturing elements, and was named Associated Equipment Company, better-known as AEC.

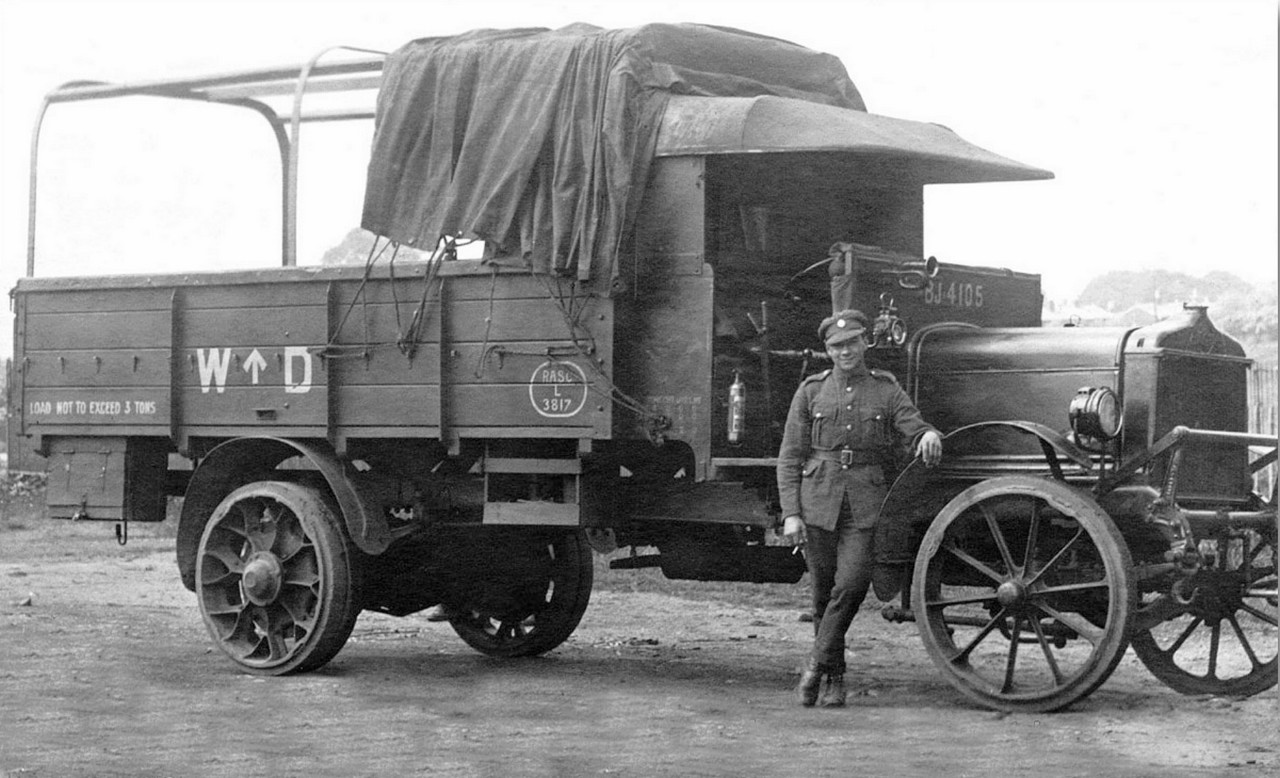
AEC Y Type lorry

AEC's first commercial vehicle was a lorry based on the X-type bus chassis. With the outbreak of World War I in 1914, AEC's ability to produce large numbers of vehicles using moving-track assembly lines, based on American principles, became important in supplying the increasing need for army lorries. AEC commenced large-scale production of their 3-ton Y-type lorry in 1916, including some with Daimler-built engines, badged and supplied as Daimler. Continued beyond the end of the war, over 10,000 Y-type lorries were manufactured – making AEC Britain's largest domestic provider of lorries for the nation's military. From then on, AEC became associated with both lorries and buses.

=== Interwar years ===
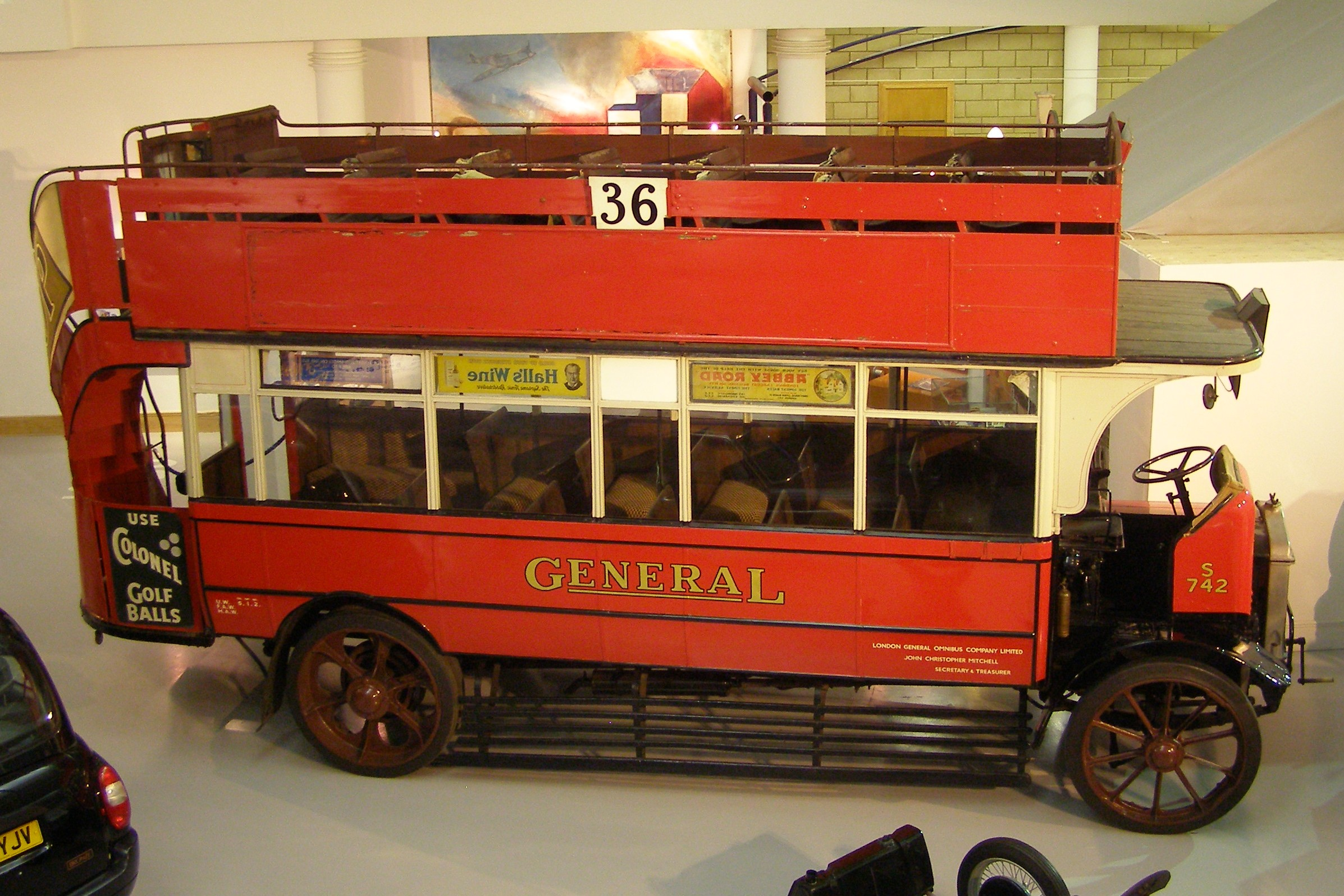
A 1921 AEC S-type Bus at the Heritage Motor Centre

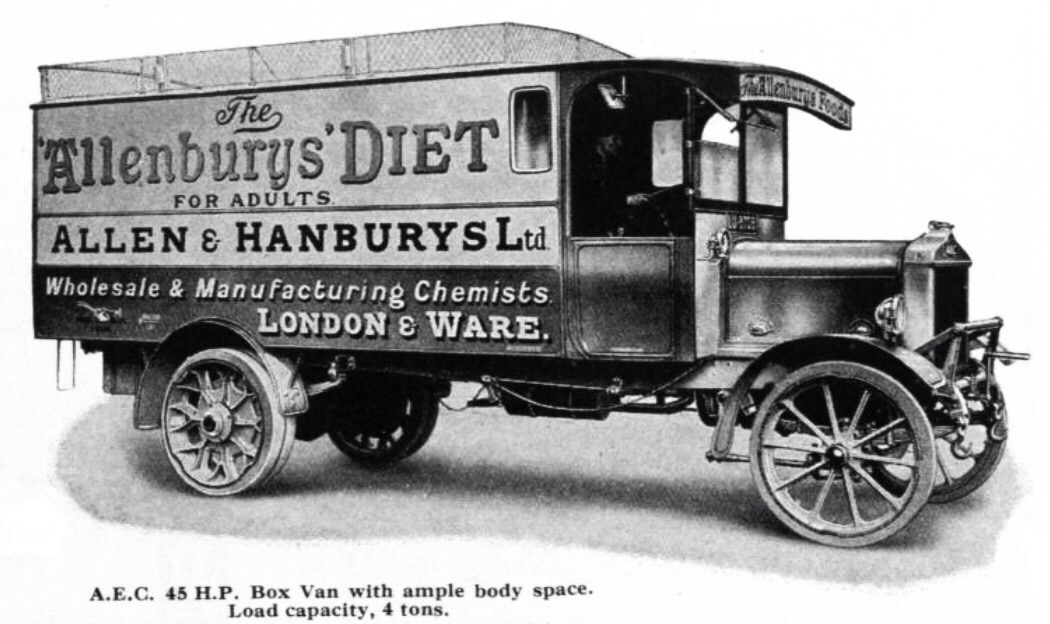
AEC 412 Blenheim (1925)

In 1926, AEC and Daimler formed the Associated Daimler Company, which was dissolved two years later. In 1927, AEC moved its manufacturing from Walthamstow to a new plant at Southall.

G. J. Rackham was appointed Chief Engineer and Designer in 1928. He had previously worked for Leyland Motors. His ideas contributed significantly to AEC's reputation for quality and reliability.

From 1929, AEC produced new models: the names of lorries began with "M" (Majestic, Mammoth, Mercury, and so on), and those of buses began with "R" (Regent, Regal, Renown, and so on). These original "M-models" continued in production until the end of World War II. AEC introduced diesel engines across the range in the mid-1930s.

From 1931 to 1938, AEC and English Electric co-produced trolleybuses. AEC supplied the chassis, and English Electric the electric motors and control equipment.

In 1932, AEC took a controlling interest in the British subsidiary of the American Four Wheel Drive (FWD) company, and began to use more standard AEC components in those vehicles, including the AEC 850 artillery tractor. To avoid confusion, these were marketed under the name Hardy. Production ceased about 1936.

In 1933, AEC collaborated with the GWR to produce a diesel powered railcar with an art deco styled body. This followed on from the successful adaptation of a Regal single-decker bus for rail use. Three more were ordered in 1934, the latter fitted with two sets of engines and transmissions. A further series fitted with a more angular body were supplied in the years leading up to the war.

=== World War II ===
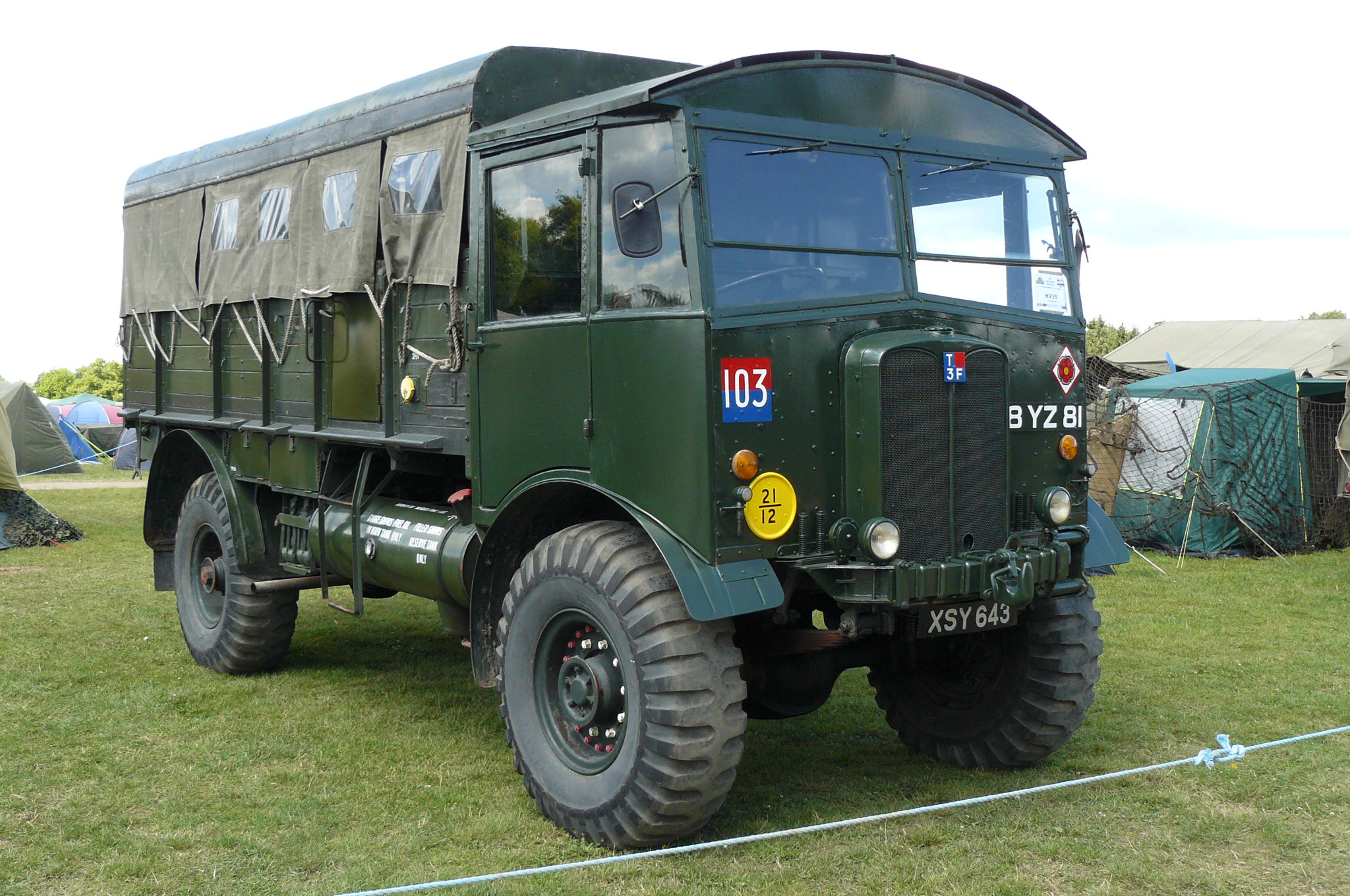
AEC Matador artillery tractor

Non-military production stopped in 1941. From then until 1944, AEC produced nearly 10,000 vehicles for the war effort. During the war, AEC produced their 10-ton 4x4 Matador artillery tractor (an adaptation of their commercial 4x2 Matador lorry that exploited AEC's experience with the Hardy FWD venture). The Matador was used for towing guns such as the 5.5-inch medium gun and the 3.7-inch AA gun. The Matador chassis was used as the basis for the Deacon a self-propelled 6-pounder anti-tank gun, which was used briefly in North Africa.

A 6x6 version was designated as the "AEC Marshall" but almost always called the Matador.

Four hundred AEC armoured command vehicles, popularly known as the "Dorchester" (after the hotel), were built on the Matador and Marshall chassis.

Production of the AEC armoured car started in 1941. Three marks were built, with guns from 40 mm to 75 mm, totalling 629 vehicles. They remained in use post-war.

=== Post war ===
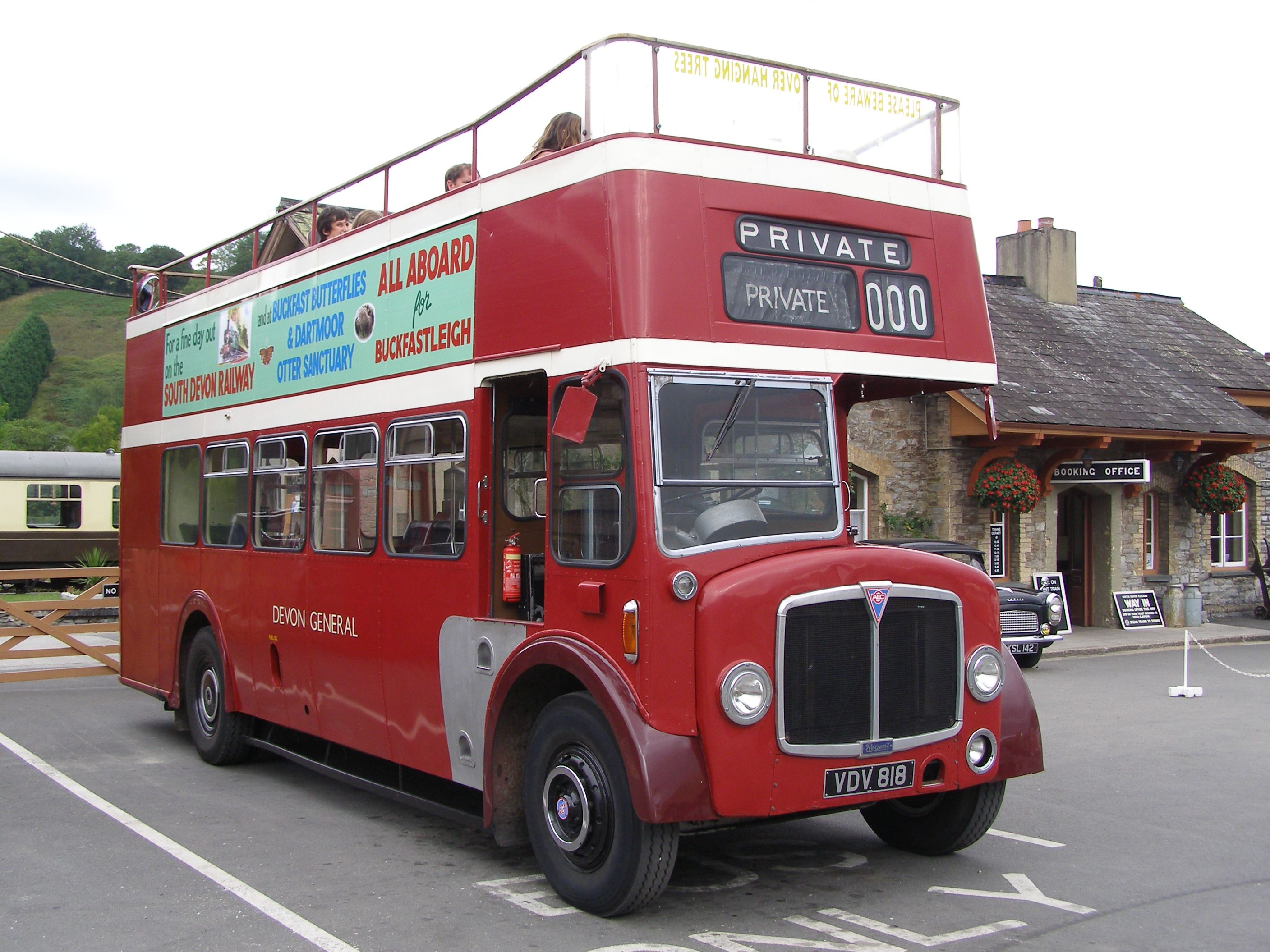
A 1957 AEC Regent V

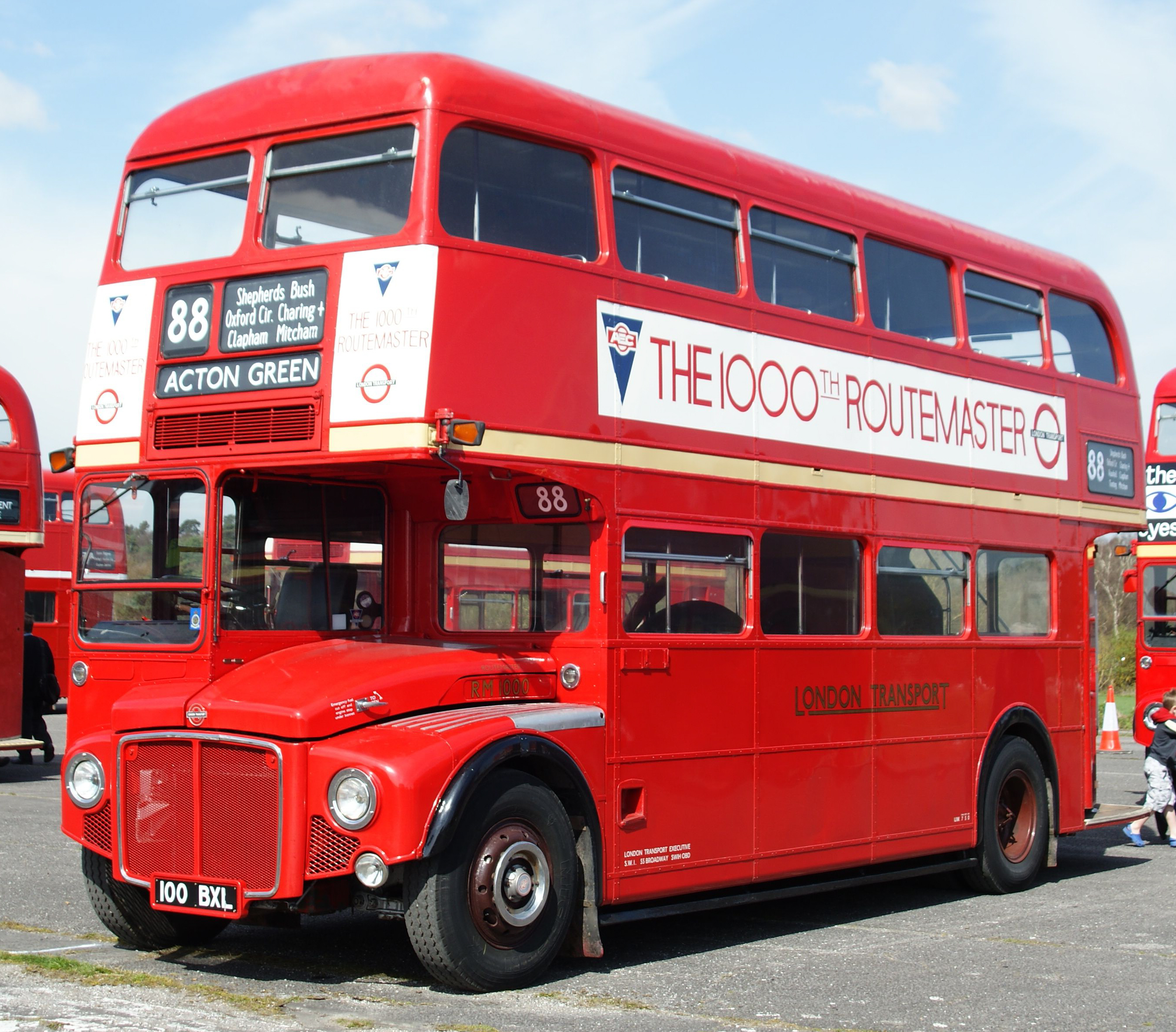
A 1961 AEC Routemaster

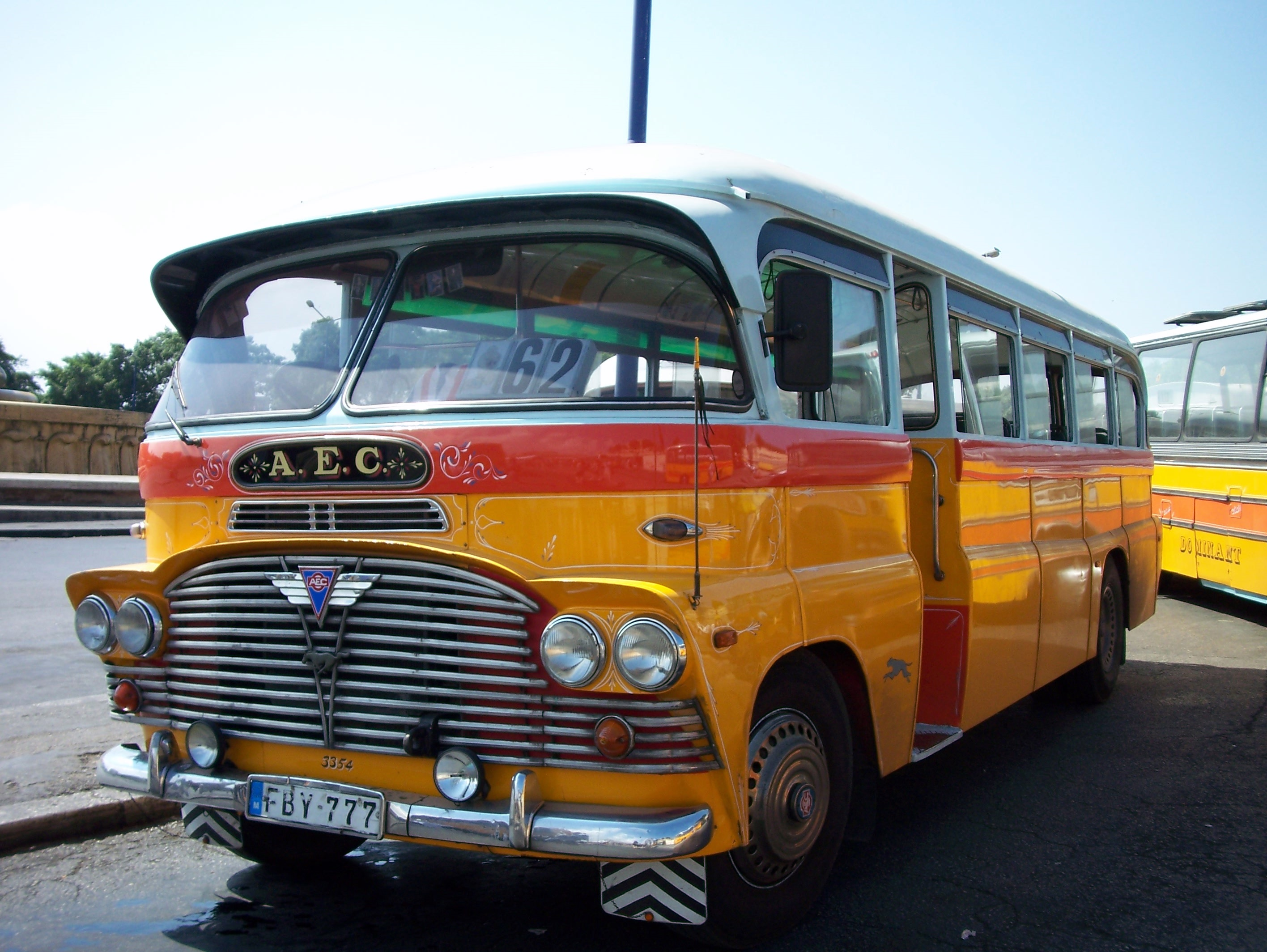
AEC bus in Malta

In 1946, AEC and Leyland Motors formed British United Traction as a joint venture to manufacture trolleybuses and traction equipment for diesel railcars since reduced demand would not require the existing capacity of both parents.

In 1946, AEC resumed civilian production with the 0661/20 Regent II and the 0662/20 Regal I. These were not new models but a recommencement of the most basic AEC 1939 specification bus models. The single-decker was going to be marketed as Regal II until somebody at Southall remembered the 1936-8 lightweight 0862 model of that name and as a result the name was corrected after the launch publicity had been printed. At the end of 1946, the postwar 0961 RT was in build, and by 1948 Mammoth Major, Matador and Monarch Mk IIIs were in production, followed by the 'provincial' Regent III and the Regal III.

Also in 1948, AEC acquired Crossley Motors and the Maudslay Motor Company and on 1 October 1948 AEC set up Associated Commercial Vehicles (ACV) as the holding company for the newly acquired businesses and its own manufacturing firm, which was renamed AEC Limited. The initials AEC remained on its vehicles, with the exception of some badge-engineered versions, such as the Crossley Regent bus. In 1949, ACV acquired the bus coachbuilding company Park Royal Vehicles, along with its subsidiary Charles H Roe. Park Royal designed a new cab for the AEC Mercury in the mid-1950s, which appeared on all models across the range about this time.

In 1961, ACV acquired Thornycroft. The Thornycroft name disappeared from all the vehicles except the specialist airport crash tenders, such as the Nubian, and the Antar off-road tractor unit. Production of the AEC Dumptruk was transferred to Basingstoke, and the Thornycroft six-speed constant-mesh gearbox and later nine and ten-speed range-change versions were fitted to AEC, Albion and Leyland buses and lorries.

The AEC engines were used in Finnish Vanaja lorries and buses in the 1960s.

=== Leyland takeover ===
Leyland Motors acquired ACV in 1962. AEC lorries were given the same "Ergomatic" cabs used across several Leyland marques (including Albion). In 1968, all AEC double-decker buses ceased production with the completion of the last Routemasters, and its last buses, motorcoaches and lorries were built in 1979. The AEC name actually disappeared from commercial vehicles in 1977, but the Leyland Marathon was built at the Southall plant until British Leyland closed it in 1979. In 1979, the production of Leyland (AEC) vehicles was transferred to remaining Leyland Truck and Bus plants.

== Foreign operations ==
=== ACLO ===
ACLO (Associated Company Lorries & Omnibuses) was the brand name used by AEC in Latin America and in Spain to sell all their products.

ACLOs were principally found in Argentina, Brazil, and particularly in Uruguay, where there were two ACLO fleets (150 buses in total) built by Verheul in the Netherlands on the Regal Mark IV chassis. They were interesting buses, faster than Leyland Tiger in use by other fleets. It was said at the time (early '60s) that the main reason was inter-urban gearing instead of purely urban gearing present in Leylands. An interesting feature was the preselector gear-change, similar to those in Leyland buses, controlled by a small gated lever installed by the steering wheel, with a reversed gate, with first gear to the right and up, and fourth gear to the bottom and left. In Argentina, 25 Verheul buses also built on the Regal Mark IV chassis were sold in 1961.

In Spain, ACLOs could be seen mainly as double-deck buses in Barcelona, and as line coaches in ALSA fleet.

=== UTIC-AEC ===
In Portugal, the AEC vehicles, mainly coaches and buses but also lorries, were assembled and bodied by UTIC, a large coachbuilding firm based in Lisbon and Porto, and were marketed under the UTIC-AEC badge. AEC based vehicles were market leaders in Portugal, for instance, by the time of creation of Rodoviária Nacional, in 1975, those accounted for 67.5% of the more than 2500 buses and coaches inherited fleet. Production remained strong throughout the late 1970s and would cease in the end of 1980.

From 1971 to 1973 the Loughborough based dealer Moseley imported nine UTIC U2043 coaches which were marketed as the Moseley Continental Tagus. They were mechanically equivalent to a rear-engined Reliance or a coach version of the Swift 691 which AEC had planned but never marketed. They were expensive to buy new and the square sided styling looked dated to British eyes in the age of the Elite and Dominant coaches, thus they were slow selling. These were probably the only right hand drive coaches built by UTIC. At the time Moseley also marketed Salvador Caetano Coaches under its own name.

=== Barreiros AEC ===
In the late 1950s, Spanish government restrictions on imports reduced AEC sales in Spain to virtually nil. As a consequence, AEC approached a Spanish truck manufacturer, Barreiros Diesel, to jointly produce buses and coaches based on AEC designs. The venture started in 1961, used Barreiros AEC as brand name, disregarding ACLO, and seemed promising; production of the AEC off-road dump trucks being planned too. Nevertheless, the Leyland takeover in 1962 soon undermined the agreement, as Leyland was partnering with Barreiros's Spanish arch-rival, Pegaso. Eventually, Barreiros looked for another collaborator in the bus arena, signing in 1967 an agreement with Belgian company Van Hool.

== Vehicles ==
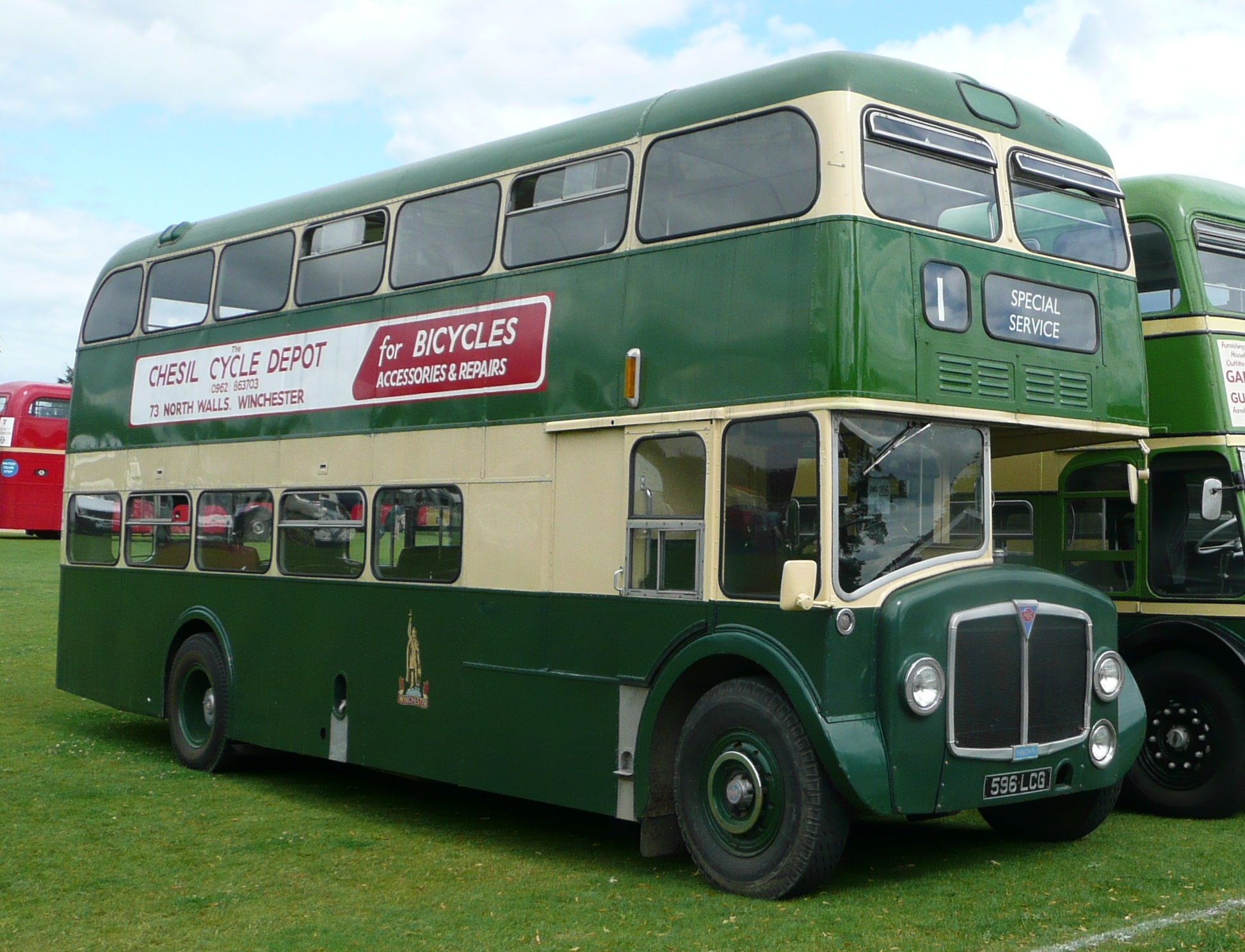
A preserved AEC Renown, previously run by King Alfred Motor Services

=== Lorries and other commercial vehicles ===
Y Type

AEC's first purpose-built commercial vehicle, the Y Type was introduced in 1915. The improved YA Type appeared in 1917. More than ten thousand of these vehicles were supplied to the War Department by 1919. Many of these were acquired by civilian operators following the war. YB and YC Types continued in production until 1921.

Model 201

Model 428

Model 501 & 506

Model 701

Roadtrain

The AEC Roadtrain was an experimental early 1930s road train.

Majestic

There were three distinct incarnations of the AEC Majestic:

- Majestic, model 666 (built 1930–36) – 6 ton normal-control lorry.
- Majestic, models 3521/3531 (1950–57) – 10-ton twin-steer ("Chinese six") 6x2 cabover.
- Majestic, model GB6 (1959–68), – 6x4 variant of heavy normal-control Mogul, built primarily for export and specialist uses.

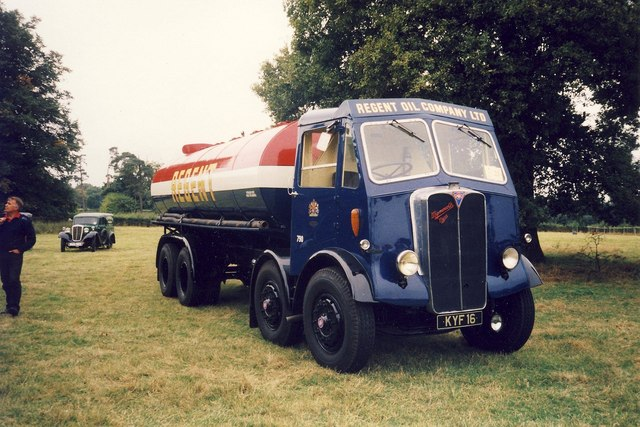
Mammoth Major Tanker

Mammoth

The AEC Mammoth was introduced in 1930, being largest truck in the AEC range and the first to be available as a cabover. It was originally a 7/8 ton 4x2 lorry with a six-cylinder overhead valve engine developing 110 bhp (82 kW) on a wheelbase of 16 ft 7 in. A 6x4 variant was the "Mammoth Major". From 1934 a distinction was made between the lighter Mammoth Minor, and the heavier Mammoth Major 6 (6x4) and Mammoth Major 8 (8x2 or 8x4), which appeared in 1934. The Mammoth Major Mk II was introduced in 1935; the eight-wheeler could carry 15-ton loads. It remained in production until 1948 when it was superseded by the Mk III, which was mechanically similar, but had the Park Royal cab. Subsequent Mammoth Majors featured the Mk V cab, and finally the tilting Ergomatic cab. The original 4x2 Mammoth and lightweight Mammoth Minor were relatively short-lived models, but both names were later re-used.

- Mammoth, model 667 (1930–34) – 4x2 cabover
- Mammoth Major 6 Mk.I/II, models 668 (1930–35), 366/O366 (1935–48) – 6x4 cabover (Mk.II from 1934)
- Mammoth Major 6 Mk.III, models 3671/3672/3673 (1948–60) – 6x4 cabover ('tin front' cab from 1955)
- Mammoth Major 6 Mk.V, models G6 (1959–66) – 6x4 cabover
- Mammoth Major 6, model TG6R (1965–78) – 6x4 cabover (Ergomatic tilting cab)
- Mammoth Major 8 Mk.II, models 680 (1934–35), 386/O386 (1935–48) – 8x4 cabover
- Mammoth Major 8 Mk.III, models 3871/3872/3873/3881/3882 (1948–61) – 8x4 cabover ('tin front' cab from 1955)
- Mammoth Major 8 Mk.V, model G8 (1959–66) – 8x4 cabover,
- Mammoth Major 8, model TG8R (1966–78) – 8x4 cabover (Ergomatic tilting cab)
- Mammoth Minor, model 366L (1936–41) – lightweight 6x2 cabover
- Mammoth Minor, model TG6RF (1965–67) – twin-steer ("Chinese six") 6x2 cabover (Ergomatic tilting cab)

Normal control variants of the Mammoth family were also available, although much less common that the cabovers:

- Mammoth Major 6 Mk.I/II, model 266 (1930–36) and 366 (1936–48) – 6x2 normal control
- Mammoth Major 6 Mk.III, models 2671 (1948–60) and 2621/2631 (1956–62) – 6x4 normal control
- Mammoth Mk.III, model 2421/2431 (1956–62), 4x2 normal control

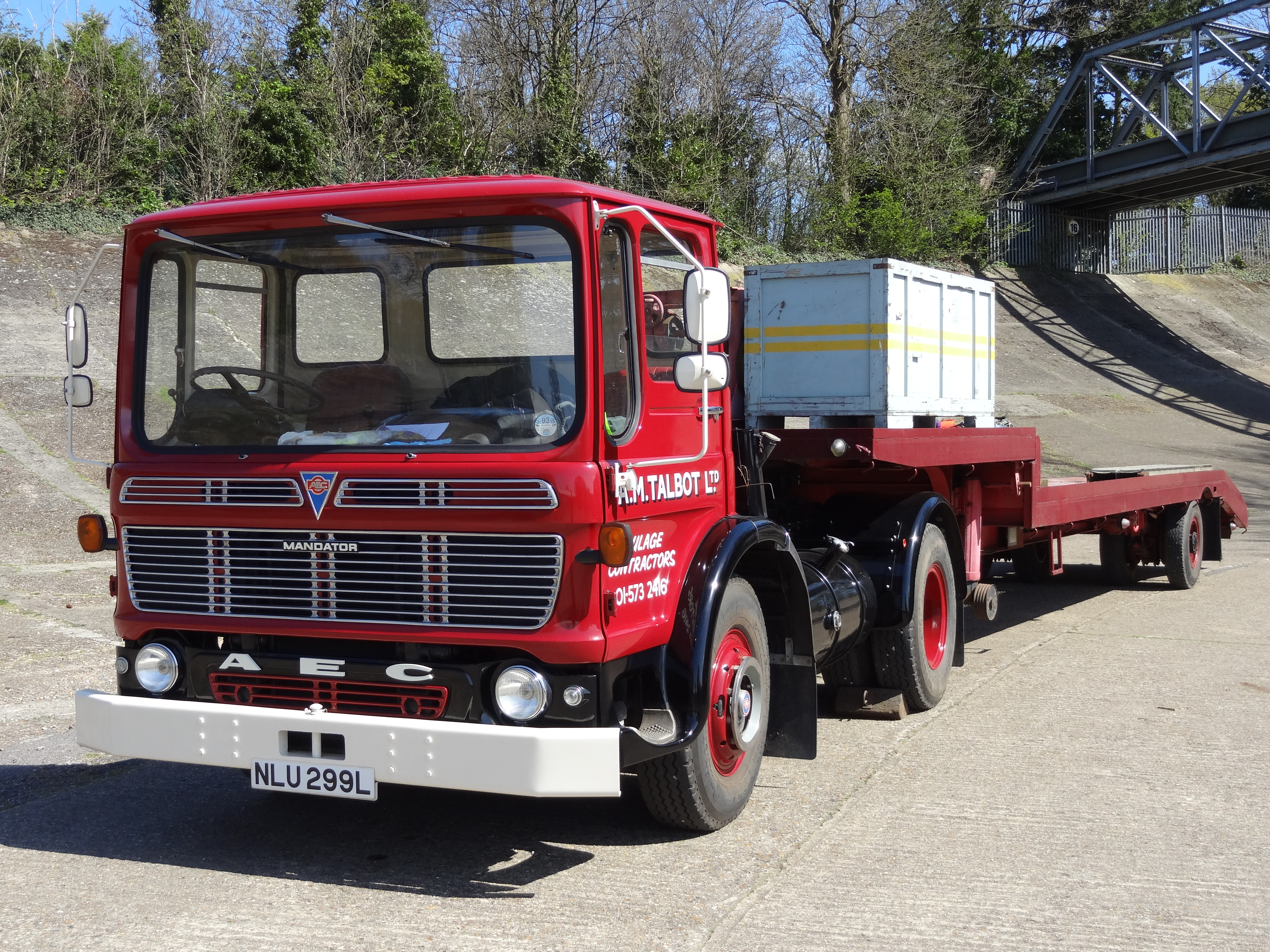
AEC Mandator

Mandator

The AEC Mandator name was originally used for medium-duty models in the 1930s, but in 1949 the Matador 4x2 was renamed Mandator. The name was used for the heavier AEC 4x2s until the end of production in the 1970s, and was especially popular as a tractor unit.

- Mandator, model 669 (1931–35) – medium-duty 4x2 cabover
- Mandator, model 672 (1931–32) – medium-duty 4x2 normal control
- Mandator Mk.III, models 3472/3474/3475 (1949–55) – 4x2 cabover. Successor to model 3471 Matador.
- Mandator Mk.III, model 2472 (1949–61) – 4x2 normal-control
- Mandator Mk.III, models 3481/3482/3483/3484 (1955–61) – 4x2 cabover ('tin front' cab)
- Mandator Mk.V, model G4 (1959–66) – 4x2 cabover
- Mandator, model TG4 (1965–78) – 4x2 cabover (Ergomatic tilting cab)

Marathon

The Leyland Marathon (1973–79) was a high powered 4x2 or 6x4 tractor unit with a modified Ergomatic cab, which was built at the AEC factory in Southall. A few were given AEC badges to satisfy individual customer preferences. The Marathon name had formerly been used on a Maudslay bus chassis.

Marshal

Pre-war 6x4 3ton military lorry built with various body styles – some were employed by the Royal Air Force as cranes (using the Coles Crane). The name was reintroduced for 6x2 and 6x4 medium-duty lorries from the 1960s–1970s.

- Marshal, model 644 (1932/35–41) – 6x4 military truck. Prototypes (1932) included both normal-control and cabover versions, but all production vehicles were cabovers.
- Marshal, model GM6 (1961–66) – 6x2 or 6x4 medium-duty cabover (Mk.V cab)
- Marshal, model TGM6 (1965–77) – 6x2 or 6x4 medium-duty cabover (Ergomatic tilting cab). Variant with larger (but downrated) engine was known as Marshal Major, model 2TGM6
- Marshal 8, model TGM8 (1967–68) 8x4 medium duty cabover (Ergomatic tilting cab)

Matador

The original AEC Matador five-ton 4x2 commercial lorry was introduced in 1932, but the name was most famously used for the 4x4 artillery tractor version introduced in 1938. These vehicles exploited AEC's experience with four-wheel drive that it had gained from its involvement in the British Four Wheel Drive vehicles marketed under the name Hardy. AEC produced 9,620 artillery tractors; 514 6x6 bowsers for the Royal Air Force; 192 6x6 lorries (some of which had Coles Cranes mounted); and 185 similar vehicles, but 6x4, for mobile oxygen plants. They were known by the nickname "Mat". New civilian Matadors appeared after the war, and many ex-military Matadors were adapted for post-war commercial use, especially as timber lorries and recovery vehicles. There was a final short run of the 0853 4x4 Matador for the Army in the early fifties, due to ongoing issues with the introduction of the replacement Leyland. The last Matador was a 4x4 variant of the Mercury, introduced in 1960.

- Matador Mk.I, model 645 (1932–35) – 4x2 cabover version of Mercury
- Matador Mk.II, model 346/O346 (1935–47) – 4x2 cabover. Model 236/O246 (1935–40) was the normal-control version
- Matador Mk.II/III, model 853/O853 (1938–59) – 4x4 cabover (Mk.III from 1947)
- Matador Mk.III, model 3471 (1947–49) – 4x2 cabover. Renamed Mandator in 1949
- Matador, model 4GM4 (1960–65) – 4x4 cabover (Mk.V cab, but marketed as "Matador Mk.II")

The Matador name is often used for the 10-ton 6x6 military vehicles of Model 854/O854 (built 1940–44), but this model was never given an official name. It was an extended Matador chassis, mated to a Marshal double-drive bogie.

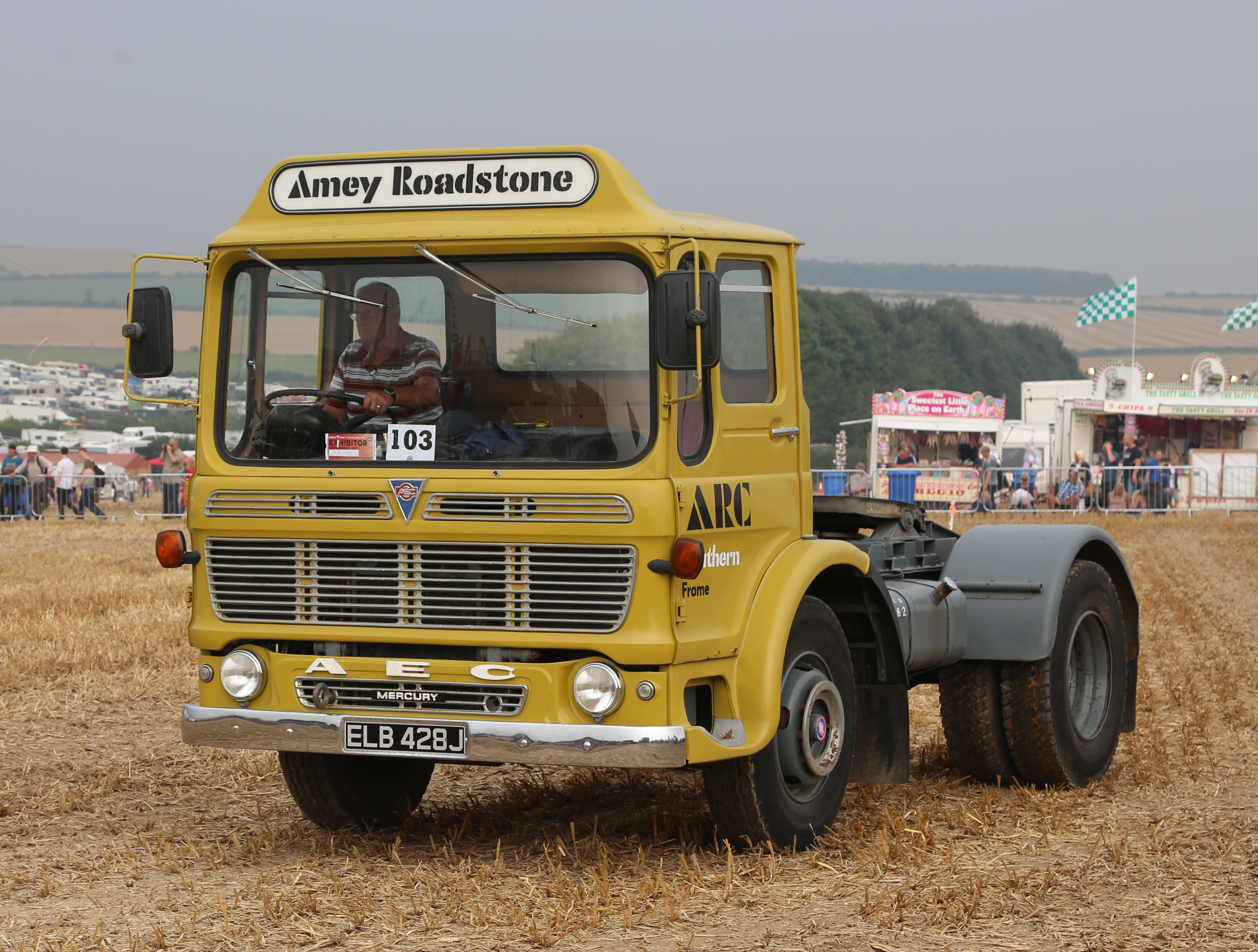
A 1970 AEC Mercury

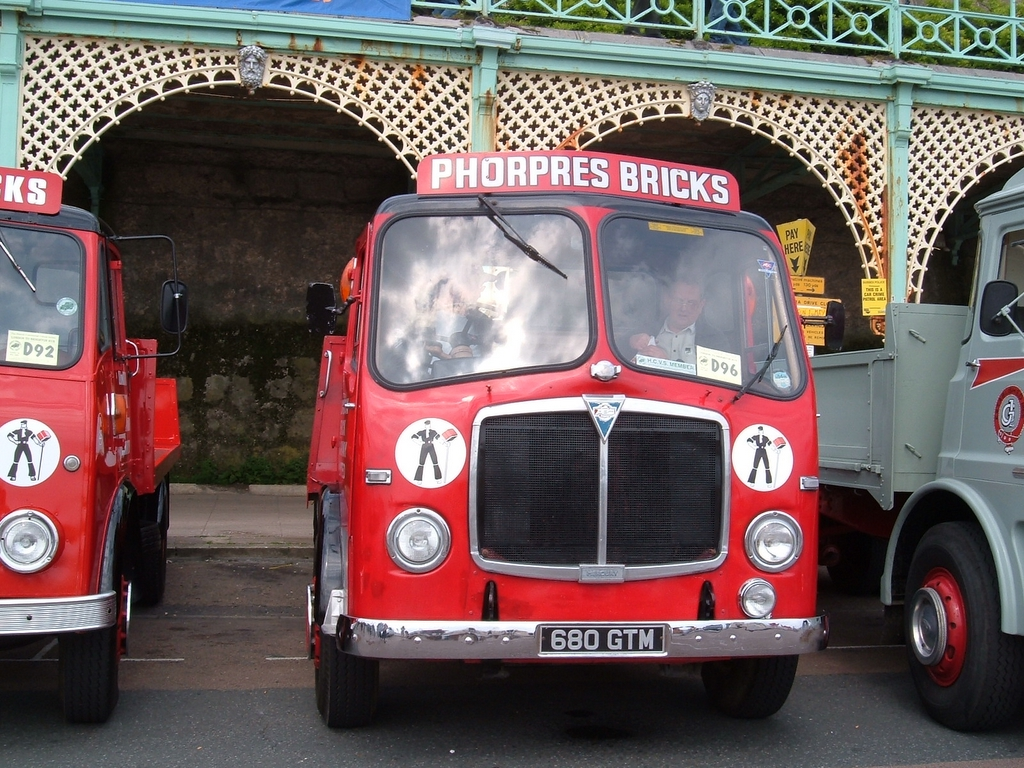
A 1962 AEC Mercury

Mercury

The AEC Mercury (Model 440) was first built in 1928. This was a forward-control lorry with a wheelbase of 14 ft (4.3 m) for 4 ton payloads. The Model 640 was introduced in 1930, with a four-cylinder petrol engine developing 65 bhp.

The name was resurrected for medium-duty 4x2 lorries and tractors built from the 1950s to the 1970s.

- Mercury, model 640 (1928–37) – 4x2 normal control
- Mercury, model G4M (1953–65) – 4x2 medium-duty cabover. The Mk.I (1953–55) usually had a Duramin cab, whereas the Mk.II (1955–65) usually had Park Royal cabs ('tin front' and later Mk.V cabs). Other cab manufacturers included Bowyers. In some export markets this model was sold as Monarch
- Mercury, model TGM4 (1964–77) – 4x2 medium duty cabover (Ergomatic tilting cab). In some export markets (notably New Zealand) this model was sold as a Monarch

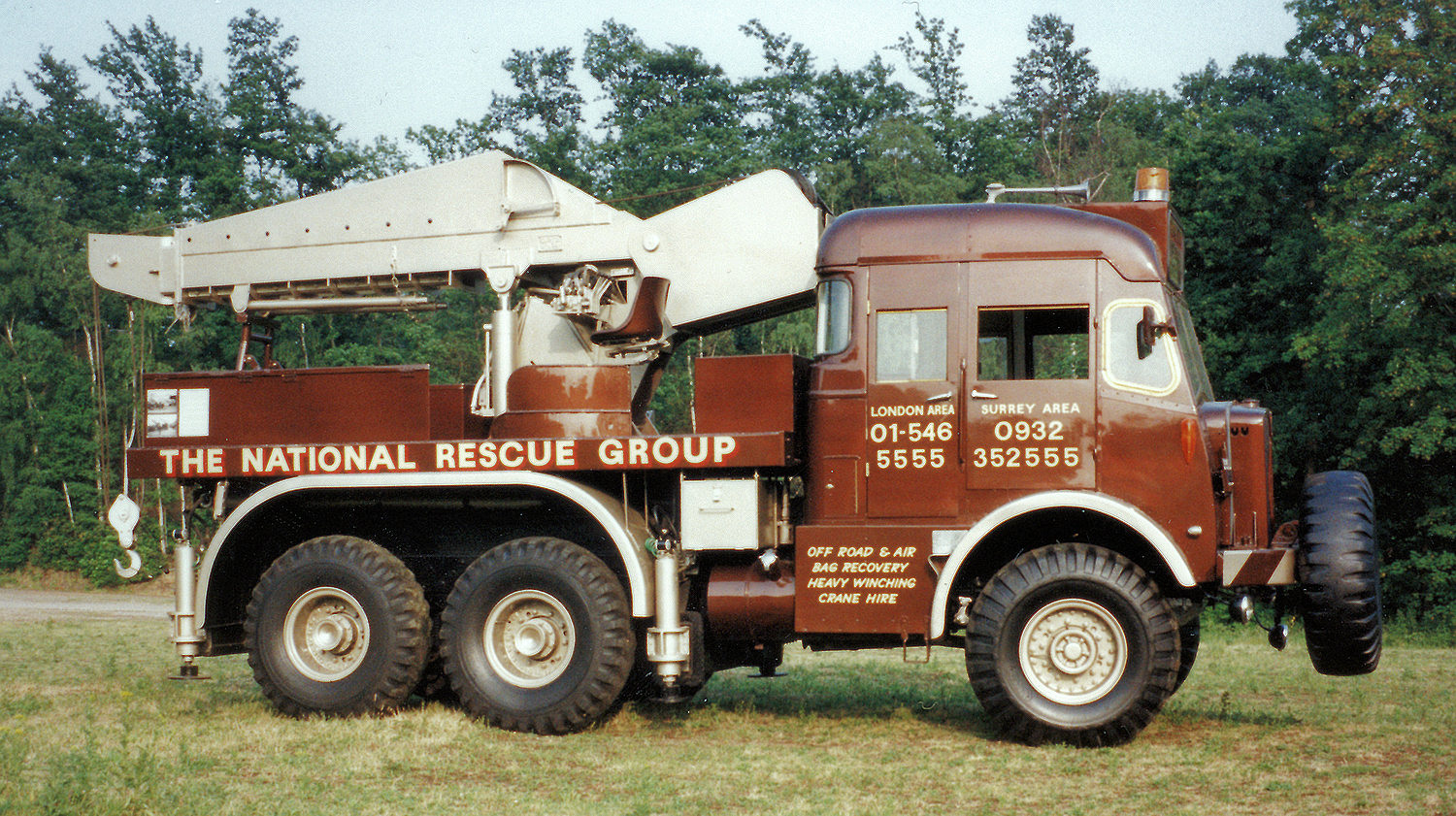
AEC Militant MK1 Breakdown Tender No.1456 MR Milly Tant

Militant

The AEC Militant – or "Milly" – was the 1952 replacement for the Matador; a 6x4 or 6x6 artillery tractor/military lorry which continued in various forms until the 1970s. The Militant name had earlier been used by Maudslay in the 1930s.

- Militant Mk.I, models O859 and O860 (1952–66) – 6x4 and 6x6 cabover
- Militant Mk.II (1962, prototypes only) – 6x6 cabover (Park Royal Mk.V type cab)
- Militant Mk.III models O870 and O880 (1966–79) – 6x6 cabover. These were the last vehicles to use a variant of the AEC/Park Royal cab.

Mogul

The AEC Mogul model GM4 (1959–67) was a normal-control 4x2 built primarily for export markets. The Mogul name had originally been used on Maudslay lorries.

Monarch

The original AEC Monarch was built from 1931 to 1939 at AEC's Southall works. The first version had payload of 7 tons (increased to 7 1/2 tons from 1933) and was fitted with either an 85 hp (63 kW) four-cylinder 5.1-litre diesel engine or an 80 hp four-cylinder 5.1-litre petrol engine. This was a robust and well-designed lorry, popular with both drivers and operators. The model was discontinued in the 1950s, although the name lived on into the 1970s in some export markets. TL 3513 (1934) KYE 402 (1949)

- Monarch Mk.I, models 641 (1930–33) and 647/648 (1933–35) – 4x2 cabover
- Monarch Mk.II, models 344/346/O346 (1935–47) – 4x2 cabover. There was also a normal-control version, model 244 (1935–40)
- Monarch Mk.III, models O345/3451 (1947–56) – 4x2 cabover
- Monarch, model TGM4 (see Mercury TGM4)

Mustang

The AEC Mustang model GM6 (1956–61) was a medium-weight, twin-steer ("Chinese six") 6x2 cabover, derived from the Mercury

Dump Trucks

From 1957 to 1971 AEC built a series of large off-road dump trucks:

- Model 3673M (1957–63) – 6x4 half-cab derived from Mammoth Major, with 10 cubic yard dump dumper capacity
- Model HDK4 (1959–65) – 4x4 normal-control with 18 cu/yd capacity
- Model DK6 (1961–62) – 6x4 or 6x6 semi-cabover derived from Militant, 10 cu/yd capacity.
- Model BDK6 (1964–71) – normal-control 6-wheeler, 10 cu/yd capacity. Based on Thornycroft design. Also sold as under the Leyland, Aveling Barford and Scammell brands

== Centenary celebrations ==
2012 was the centenary of the founding of AEC Ltd, and to mark this, a number of events took place throughout the year. By far the biggest was hosted by The AEC Society, and was held over the weekend of 26 and 27 May 2012 at Newark Showground in Nottinghamshire. It was the biggest ever gathering of AECs vehicles, and over 225 attended, as well as more than 350 vehicles of other marques. It was the biggest rally ever held by The AEC Society and was closed by a flypast by the Battle of Britain memorial flight.

== See also ==
- Hobart's Funnies Associated Equipment Company in World War 2
