= AEC Roadtrain =

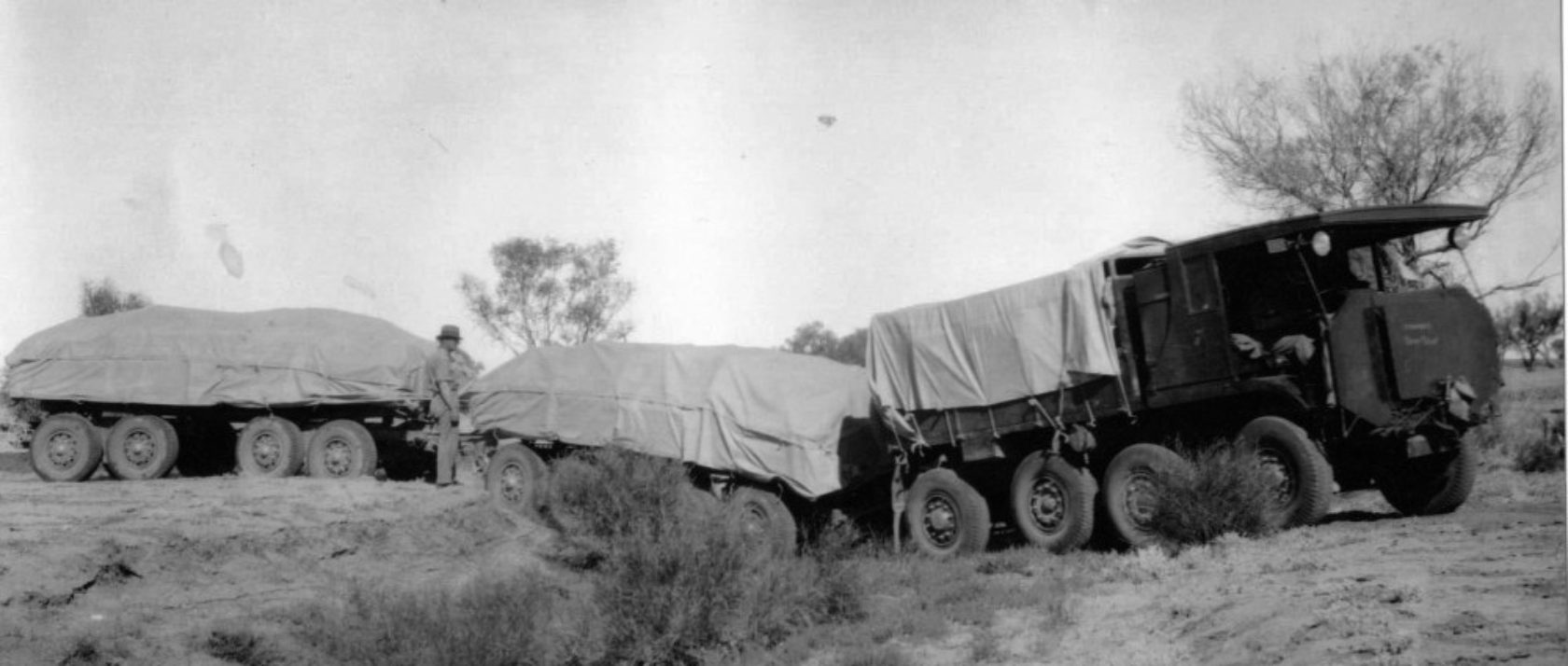
- AEC Roadtrain on its maiden journey from Adelaide to Alice Springs, May 1934

Overview
- Manufacturer: Leyland & AEC
- Also called: Overseas road train Government Roadtrain
- Production: 1930–34
- Assembly: Leyland & Hardy Motors
- Designer: British Overseas Mechanical Transport Committee

Body and chassis
- Class: Road train
- Layout: 8x8 tractor unit; 2 x eight-wheeled trailers

Powertrain
- Engine: 130 hp (97 kW) six-cylinder diesel
- Transmission: 4 speed manual & 3 speed transfer case

Dimensions
- Wheelbase: Tractor – 14 ft (4.3 m)
- Length: Train – 71 ft 8 in (21.84 m)
- Width: 7 ft 6 in (2.29 m)
- Kerb weight: 7 LT 19 cwt (8.08 t)

The AEC Roadtrain was a prototype road train designed by the British Overseas Mechanical Transport Committee and built by Leyland Motors and Associated Equipment Company (AEC) in the early 1930s to meet a British Army requirement for an offroad capable heavy transport vehicle to open up remote areas of the British Empire.

== Design ==
The AEC Roadtrain consisted of an eight-wheeled tractor unit and two eight wheeled trailers, the entire train was 71 ft 8 in (21.84 m) long. The roadtrain's 12 wheels were articulated and independently sprung, assisting in movement over uneven terrain. Each of the roadtrain's 12 axles were fitted with a single brake drum, alternating sides down the length of the train, whilst the braking system acted upon the rear trailer and moved with decreasing power towards to front tractor unit.

=== Tractor unit ===
The tractor unit was an 8x8 vehicle powered by a 130 horsepower (97 kW) six-cylinder AEC diesel engine of 540 cubic inches (8.8 L) displacement, driven through a 4 speed manual transmission and 3 speed transfer case. All wheels had single tyres, the steering for the tractor unit was from the first and fourth axles, with the vehicle pivoting on the centre two axles, traction was applied to all eight wheels through four differentials.

=== Trailers ===
The roadtrain's eight wheeled trailers were self-tracking, following in the tracks of the tractor unit. The trailers were fitted with two bogies at either end that turned in opposite directions, each bogie fitted with a turntable connected to the other by a spring loaded linkage.

== History ==
=== Development ===
At the 1927 British Colonial Office conference it was determined it would be more cost effective to develop a land tractor or road train than to invest the high costs required to install railways into remote areas of the British Commonwealth. The design specifications for the land tractor were created by the British Overseas Mechanical Transport Committee, for the purpose of transporting supplies to underdeveloped areas of the British Empire. Initially the project was funded by the British and South African governments, although another twenty five Commonwealth countries later contributed finances, including Australia.

=== Production units ===
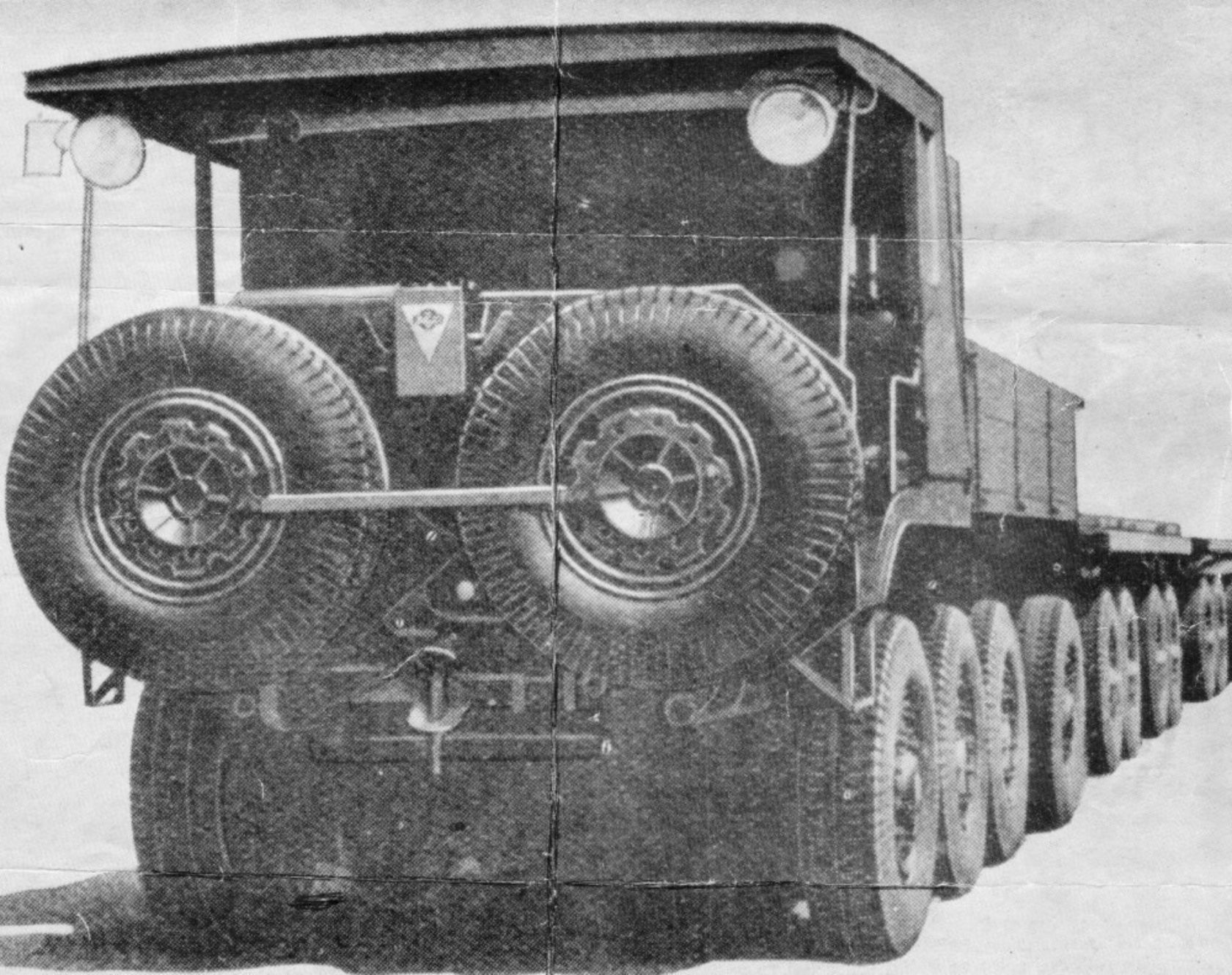
Prototype Leyland built Overseas Roadtrain before it went to Africa.

Only four (some sources state three) AEC Roadtrains were ever produced. The first prototype unit was constructed by Leyland Motors whilst the subsequent units were all built by AEC's wholly owned subsidiary company Hardy Motors. The trailers were all produced by R. A. Dyson & Co. of Liverpool.

==== African unit ====
The first AEC Roadtrain was completed in December 1930 at a cost of £12,000 and was fitted with a 539 cubic inches (8.83 L) six-cylinder petrol engine. This first unit completed 5,500 miles (8,900 km) of laden and unladen tests at the War Department's grounds at Farnborough, on completion of the trials the unit was shipped to the Gold Coast for further trials before it was put to work.

Arriving in Takoradi in February 1933, the unit operated mostly in the Ashanti Region, predominantly traversing the 240 miles (390 km) of road between Kumasi and Tamale, usually being ferried across the Volta River at Yeji. It was used to carry cement, pipes, timber and bags of salt, locals, livestock and agricultural produce including millet, kolanuts and cacoa, at one stage it was trialled as a military troop carrier. The African unit proved to be successful, completing over 80,000 miles (130,000 km) before it was sold to the Gold Coast Government for £2,000 in 1934. It is believed the petrol engine was later replaced with a diesel engine.

==== Australian unit ====
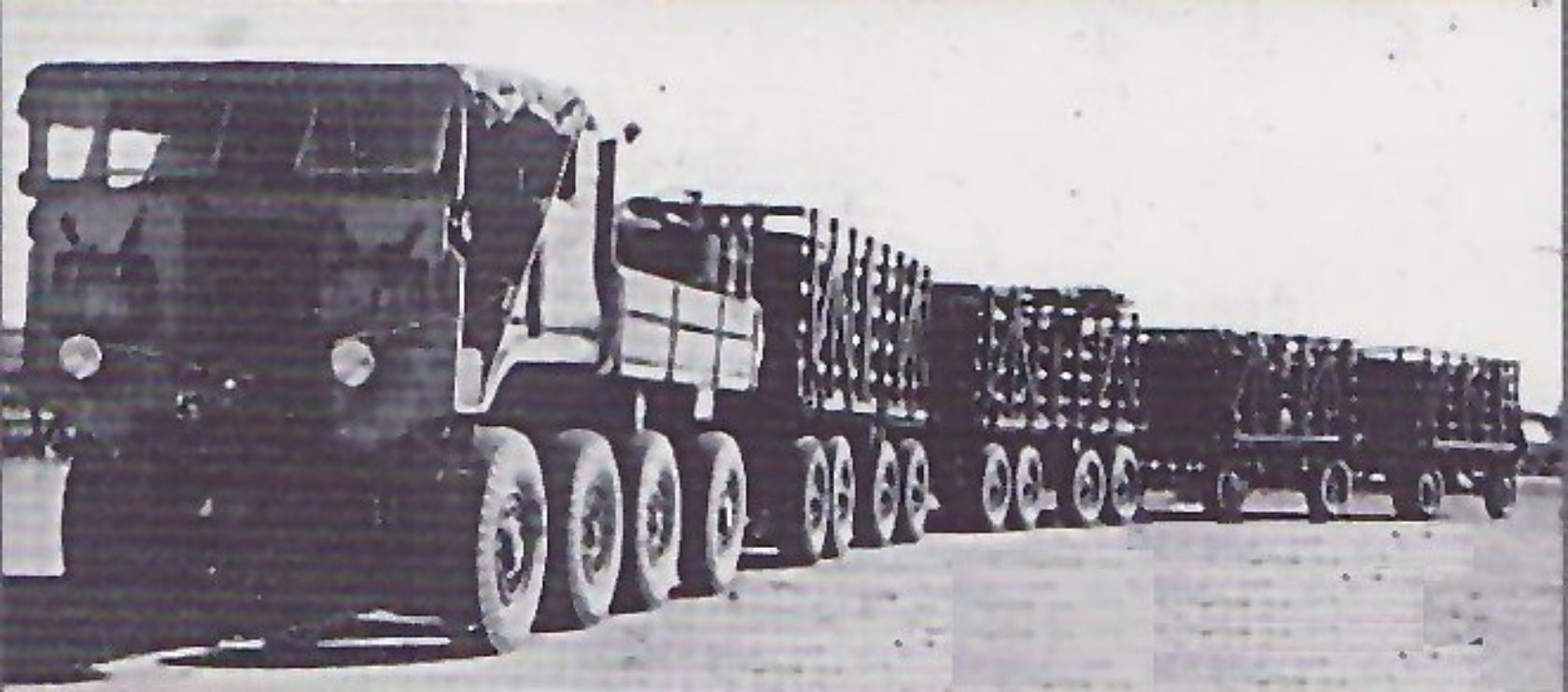
Government Roadtrain with two additional locally made trailers

Following the success of the first road train, a second was built by AEC at a cost of £7,000, the inclusion of AEC components including the engine contributing to the £5,000 saving from the first vehicle. The second unit had initially been destined to go to South Africa who had been involved in funding the program from the beginning, but the Government of Australia committed to pay £1,000 a year for two years to the British Overseas Mechanical Transport Committee, and on this basis a last minute decision was made to test the vehicle in Australia. Other countries considered included Southern Rhodesia, Swaziland (since 2018 renamed to Eswatini), Tanganyika, Mauritius and India, the Government of India had been told the unit could be demonstrated and possibly remain in India following trials in Australia.

Arriving in Australia in early 1934, following some local testing it set out in April from Adelaide to Alice Springs via Oodnadatta under the command of Captain (later Brigadier) E. M. Dollery, Chief Inspector of Mechanical Transport for the Defence Department in Australia, with a British crew comprising a Captain E. C. Roscoe, two driver/mechanics as well as a local cook. The road train covered the 1,100 miles (1,800 km) of unmade roads in three weeks, and carried all fuel and supplies for the trip. Captain Dollery later wrote:

"We tracked over trackless wastes of sandhills. Some days we only progressed two or three miles. We drove a car ahead to reconnoiter the most practicable routes and we usually had to make our own tracks to consolidate the sand, then we winched the trailers over one by one. When we reached the Hugh River we had to cross it eleven times in twenty two miles, each crossing involving a different tactic ... This was a completely new development in motor transport and all the new innovations were novel to us. It was the first time too we ever had a vehicle driven on all eight wheels, with a braking system that acted on the rear trailer first and so on back down the trailers to the prime-mover itself. But of course, the most striking part of its design, in regard to Australian conditions, was its ability to negotiate sharp turns."

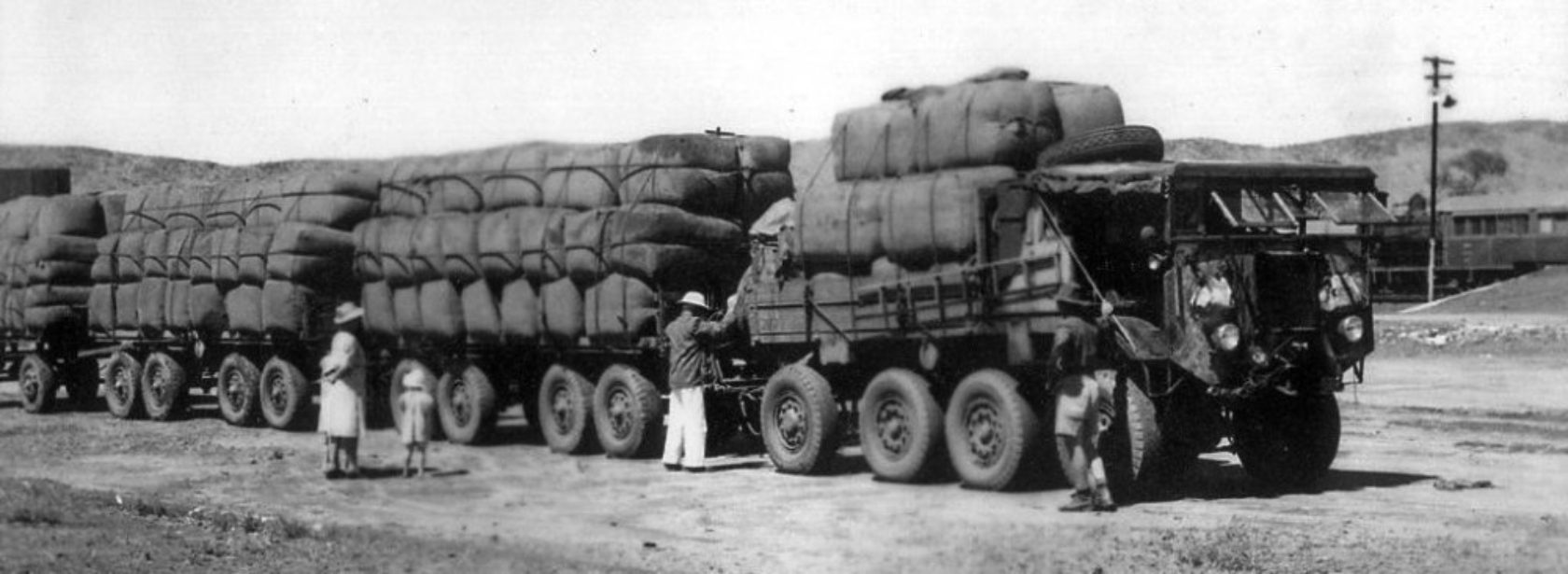
Government Roadtrain arrives in Alice Springs with a load of wool from Macdonald Downs

In Alice Springs the road train was loaded for its first commercial trip, a load of timber and corrugated iron for the first building to be erected in Tennant Creek, a pub.

The Government Roadtrain, as it became known in Australia, was purchased by the Australian Government later that year for £2,000 and remained in central Australia. Operated by the Department of the Interior, the Government Roadtrain was used to supply outback regions supplementing and leading to the demise of the cameleers who had before then been responsible for supplying outback Australia. The standard rate charged by Afghan and Pakistani cameleers charged two shillings and sixpence per ton per mile whilst the Government Roadtrain could charge as little as six and a half pence per ton per mile. During the dry season, May to October, the Government Roadtrain was used to supply remote communities and isolated cattle stations in the Victoria River, Wave Hill and Borroloola regions. During the wet season, November to April, the Government Roadtrain was used in central Australia, carting supplies to goldfields, cattle, windmills, boring equipment and supplies to remote cattle stations, wool from remote sheep stations and building material to outlying communities. In Australia an additional two trailers were built for the Government Roadtrain and in government service it covered over 1,280,000 miles (2,060,000 km) carrying loads of up to 45 long tons (46 t) (well beyond the original design specifications) before it was sold off to a timber dealer in 1946.

The Australian Government Roadtrain is believed to be the only surviving example and is located at the National Road Transport Museum in Alice Springs.

==== Russian units ====
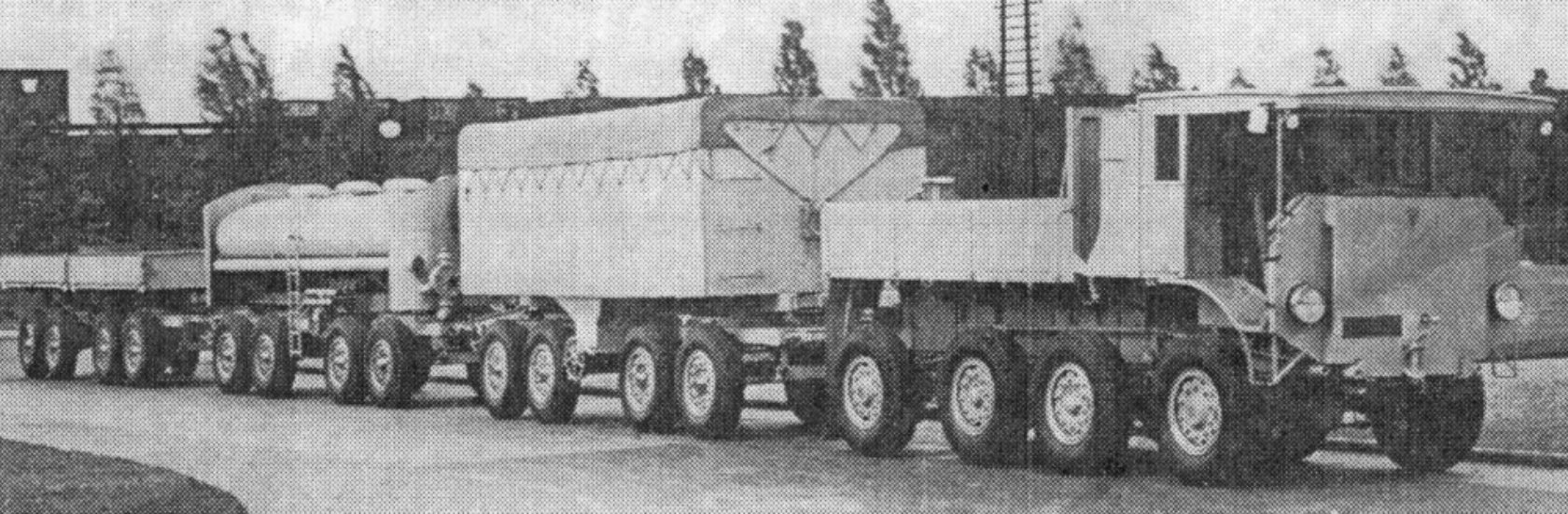
Overseas Roadtrain bound for Russia, with specialised trailers.

A third and probably a fourth AEC Roadtrain were sent to the Soviet Union in 1935. The Russian units were delivered with three trailers each with a gross vehicle weight of 30 long tons (30.5 t; 33.6 short tons) and a load carrying capacity 15 long tons (15.2 t; 16.8 short tons), one of the trailers delivered to the Soviet Union was fitted with a hopper for the carriage of grain, another was fitted with a fuel tank of 2,500 imperial gallons (11,000 L; 3,000 US gal) capacity. After trials were completed, they were used to carry heavy tools, stores and equipment to the Ural Mountains throughout World War II. There is some speculation that one of the Soviet units was later sent to Tanganyika.

== See also ==
- Road transport in Australia
