= AEC Militant =

AEC Militant Mk 1
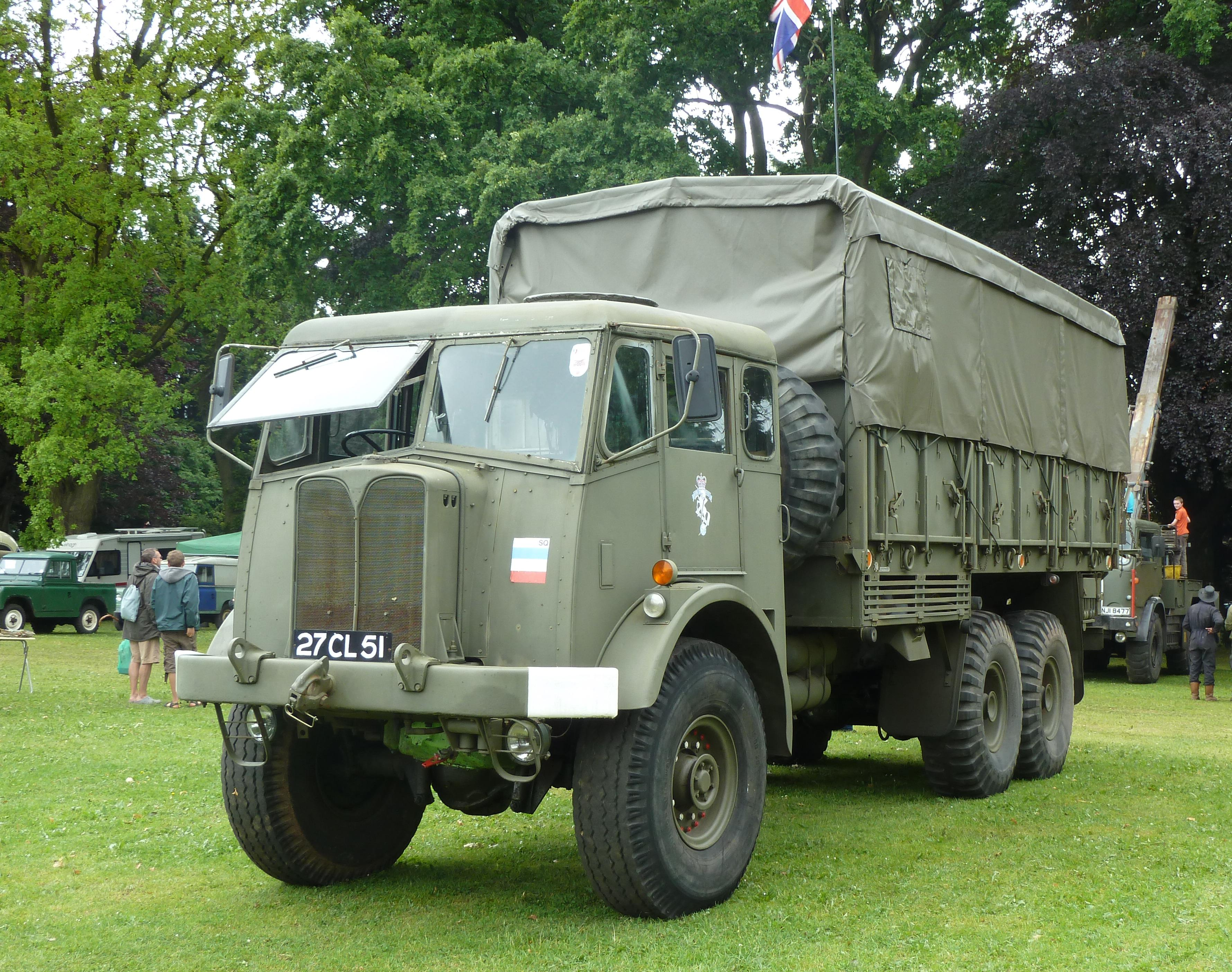
- AEC Militant Mk 1 Truck GS Cargo
- Type: Medium/heavy artillery tractor, 10-ton cargo truck
- Place of origin: United Kingdom

Production history
- Designer: Associated Equipment Company
- Manufacturer: Associated Equipment Company
- Produced: 1952–1964
- No. built: 3,200
- Variants: O859 (6×4); O860 (6×6)

Specifications
- Mass: Unladen 10.1–10.3 long tons (10.3–10.5 t)
- Length: 24 ft 1 in (7.34 m)
- Width: 8 ft (2.4 m)
- Height: 9 ft 8 in (2.95 m)
- Engine: AEC A223 straight-six diesel 150 bhp (110 kW)
- Drive: 6×4 or part time 6×6
- Transmission: 5F1Rx2
- Suspension: Live axles on semi-elliptical multi-leaf springs inverted at the rear
- Maximum speed: 25 mph (40 km/h)
- References: A complete directory of military vehicles

AEC Militant Mk 3
- Type: 10-ton cargo truck

Specifications
- Mass: Unladen 11.66 long tons (11.85 t)
- Length: 29 ft 9 in (9.07 m)
- Width: 8 ft 2 in (2.49 m)
- Height: 11 ft 6 in (3.51 m)
- Engine: AEC AV760 straight-six diesel 226 bhp (169 kW)
- Drive: 6×6
- Transmission: 6F1Rx2
- Maximum speed: 33 mph (53 km/h)
- References: The illustrated encyclopedia of military vehicles

The AEC Militant (or "Milly") was a post-war development by AEC of the AEC Matador artillery tractor used during World War II. Externally the most noticeable development was the cab, which was considerably enlarged. Unlike the Matador only six-wheel versions were produced. Other changes included the fitting of a larger, 11.3-litre 6-cylinder, diesel engine and the use of a steel frame for the cab, rather than the ash wood frame of the Matador. The Militant Mark 1 was produced in 6×4 (6 wheels, 4 driven) and 6×6 form (6 wheels, 6 driven), while the Militant Mark 3 was only produced in the 6×6 form (6 wheels, 6 driven).

== Variants ==
Although primarily intended as a replacement for the Matador artillery tractor, other variants included an articulated lorry tractor unit, a General Service or cargo lorry with a longer wheelbase and as a chassis for mounting various cranes, usually supplied by Coles.

== Service and civilian life ==
The Militant served with the British Army and some other armies in most parts of the world. It was intended as an improved artillery tractor, but after the Second World War, the development of large artillery pieces was gradually dropped in favour of more effective rockets and missiles, making this role largely redundant during the Militant's service life. Crews had mixed views of the Militant. Because it had no power steering, it took considerable effort to turn the steering wheel at slow speeds and in difficult conditions. However, it was credited with a good cross-country performance and was often used to recover the six-wheel drive Alvis Stalwart amphibious lorries that bogged in difficult conditions. (The Mk 3 did have a power assist Steering Ram).

Most variants were fitted with a chassis-mounted winch that was driven through the gearbox. This winch, which was intended for maneuvering of the towed field gun and for self-recovery of the vehicle, proved extremely strong and reliable. The Militant gained the nickname 'Knocker' from its military crews which may have been due to the rhythmic sound of the slow-revving engines.

The Knocker was the nickname of the Mk 1 and the one Mk 1 CALM was still in service with each RCT Transport Squadron until the AEC fleet was replaced by the Bedford TM 14 Tonne 6X6 in the early 90s. AEC Militant Mk 3 Medium Recovery Vehicles were replaced by Foden GS Recovery 6X6.

Many Militants were sold off by the Army in the 1970s and were purchased as heavy recovery vehicles or for forestry use by civilian operators. They were not as popular for forestry operations as their predecessor the Matador because the extra length and an extra axle made them less maneuverable in confined spaces. However, some users simply shortened the chassis and removed one axle, effectively creating a more powerful version of the Matador.

AEC Mk 1 Militants were still in service as late as 1985; the Mk 3s were still in service as late as 1990.

== Variants ==
=== Militant Mk 1 General Service (GS) Series ===
FV11001
6 × 4 Tractor Medium/Heavy Artillery.
FV11002
6 × 6 Tractor Medium/Heavy Anti-Aircraft.
FV11003
6 x 4 Truck Crane Bridging, 6 x 6 Truck Crane Bridging.
FV11004
6 × 4 Truck Tipper (End Only).
FV11005
6 × 4 Truck Tipper (Three Way).
FV11006
6 × 4 Truck Fuel Tanker (2500 Imperial Gallon Tank).
FV11007
6 × 4 Truck Cargo (14ft).
FV11008
6 × 4 Truck Cargo (16ft).
FV11009
6 × 4 Truck Fuel Tanker (2500 Imperial Gallon Tank).
FV11010
6 × 6 Tractor for Semi-Trailer.
FV11011
6 × 6 Truck Crane Missile.
FV11012
6 × 4 Truck Cargo Dropside.
FV11013
6 × 4 Crane General Purpose.
FV11014
6 × 4 Truck Excavator, 6 x 6 Truck Excavator.
FV11015
6 × 6 Tractor for 20 ton Trailer.
FV11016
6 × 6 Truck Cargo Dropside (18ft) with a front hook 7 ton winch.
FV11017
6 × 4 Truck Self-Propelled Launcher.
FV11018
6 × 6 Truck Cargo with a Scammell front hook 7 ton winch.
FV11019
6 × 4 Truck Fuel Tanker (1500 Imperial Gallon Tank).
FV11021
6 x 6 Truck Tipping Platform Self Loading Royal Engineers (R.E.) for loading and carrying wheeled or tracked vehicles, Prototype.
FV11022
6 x 6 Truck Cargo Heavy Duty (HD) RAF Nuclear Warhead Transporter.
FV11031
6 × 6 Tractor Light Anti-Aircraft.

=== Militant Mk 2 General Service (GS) Series ===
FV11041
6 × 6 Tractor Medium/Heavy Anti-Aircraft, Prototype. A total of four prototype vehicles of this variant were produced.
FV11042
6 × 6 Truck Cargo Dropside, Prototype. A total of six prototype vehicles of this variant were produced.

=== Militant Mk 3 General Service (GS) Series ===
FV11044
6 × 6 Tractor Medium Recovery Vehicle. Fitted with a Coles dual-section extensible jib crane.
FV11046
6 × 6 Truck Cargo Dropside. Available in right-hand drive and left-hand drive versions, the latter intended for the British Army of the Rhine (BAOR) in West Germany.
FV11047
6 × 6 Truck Cargo Dropside with a Scammell front hook 7 ton winch. Available in right-hand drive and left-hand drive versions, the latter intended for the British Army of the Rhine (BAOR) in West Germany.
FV11061
6 × 6 Heavy Armoured Command Vehicle, Prototype. Designed for use by command staff and signals personnel, it was produced by the Royal Ordnance Factory Leeds in 1966. Not adopted.
Unknown
6 × 6 Tractor Medium/Heavy Anti-Aircraft, proposed but not built
Unknown
6 x 6 Truck Fuel Tanker, proposed but not built
Unknown
6 × 6 Tractor for Semi-Trailer, proposed but not built
Unknown
6 x 6 Tractor Bulk Refueller, proposed but not built
Unknown
6 × 6 Truck Tipper, proposed but not built
Unknown
6 x 6 Truck Tipping Platform Self Loading Royal Engineers (R.E.) for loading and carrying wheeled or tracked vehicles. Proposed but not built.
Unknown
6 x 6 Truck Mobile Workshop, proposed but not built
Unknown
6 x 6 Truck Staff and Signals, proposed but not built

== Gallery ==
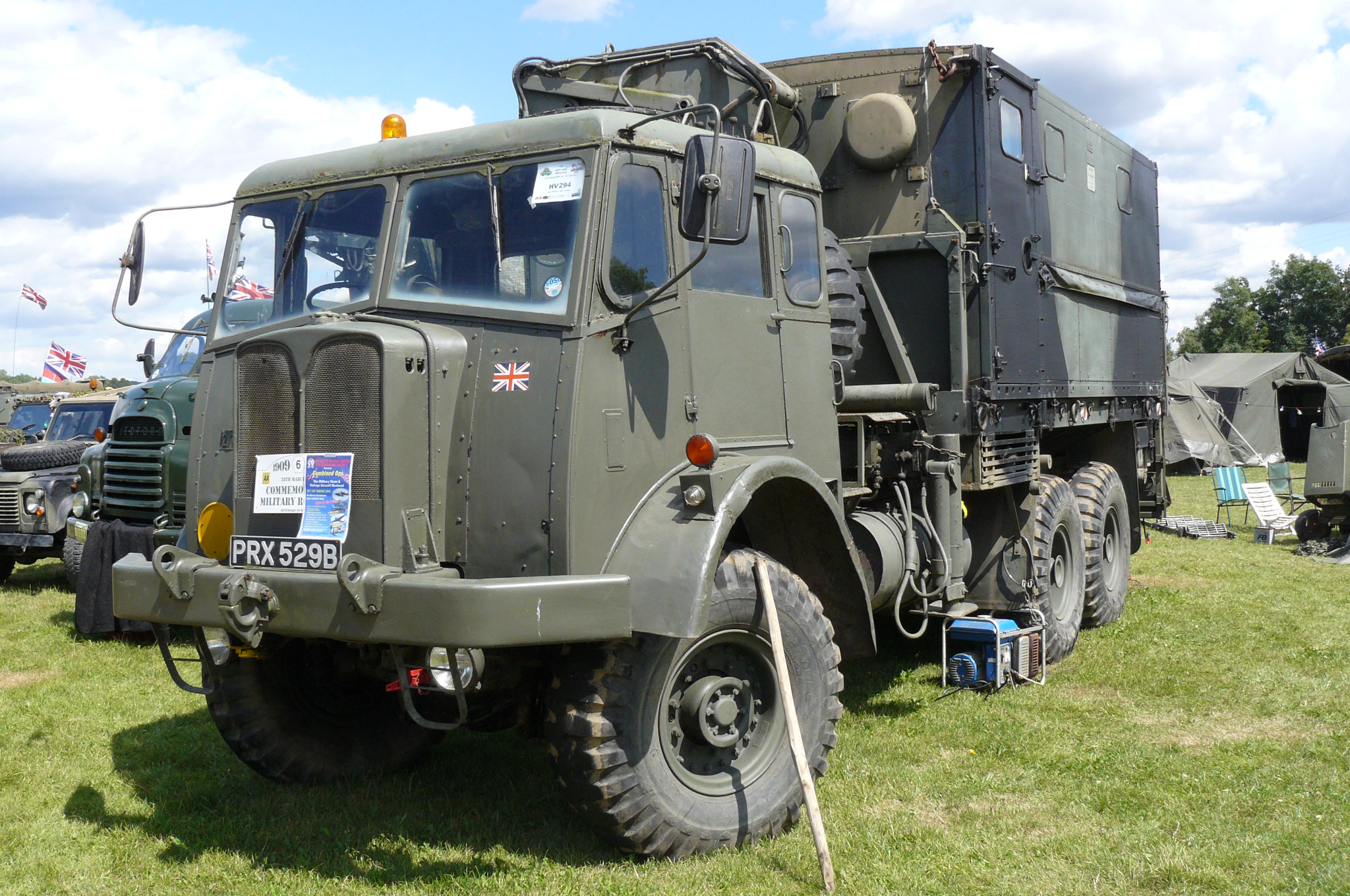
AEC Militant Mk I

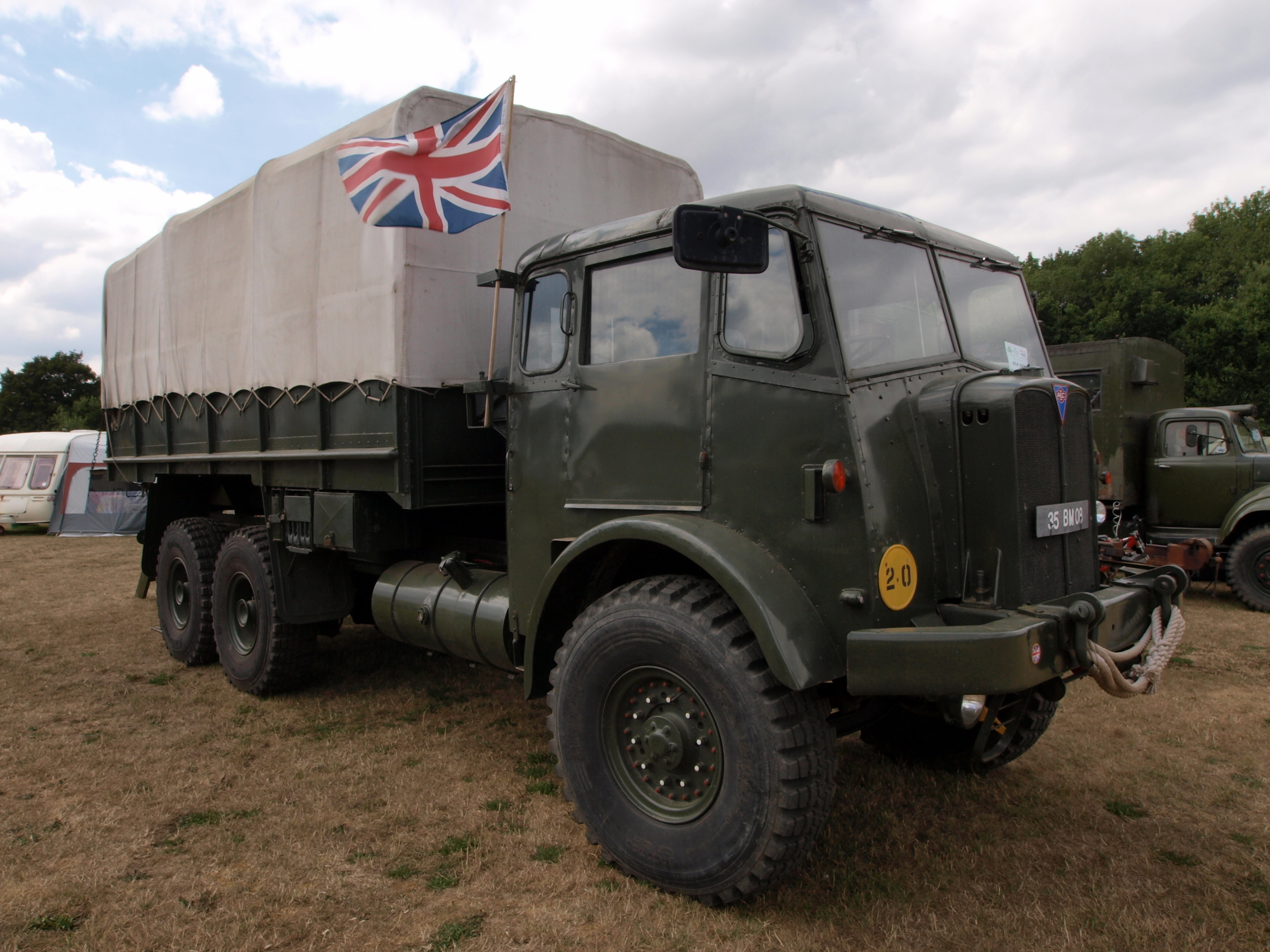
AEC Militant Mk I

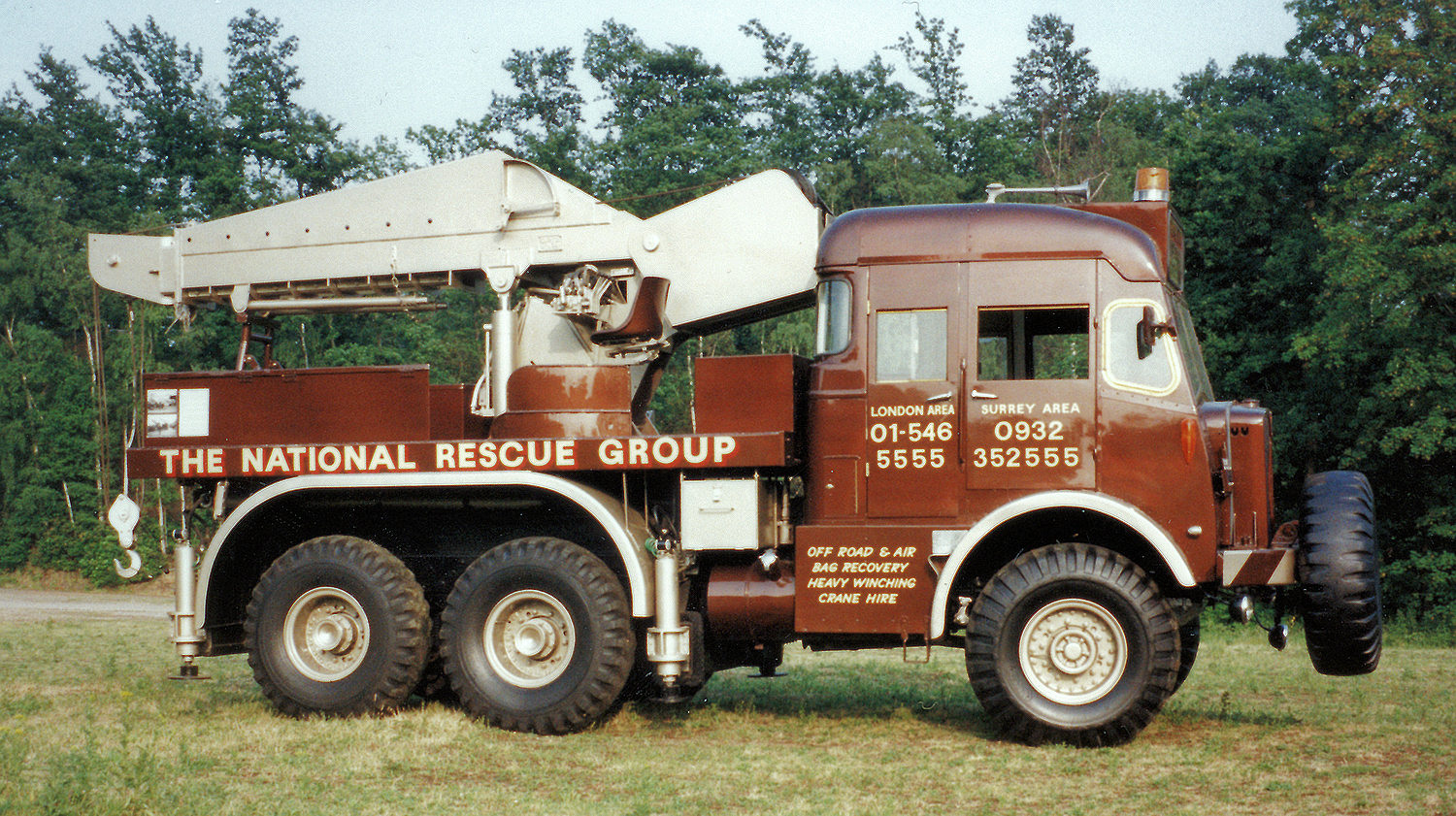
AEC Militant Mk I Breakdown Tender No.1456 MR Milly Tant

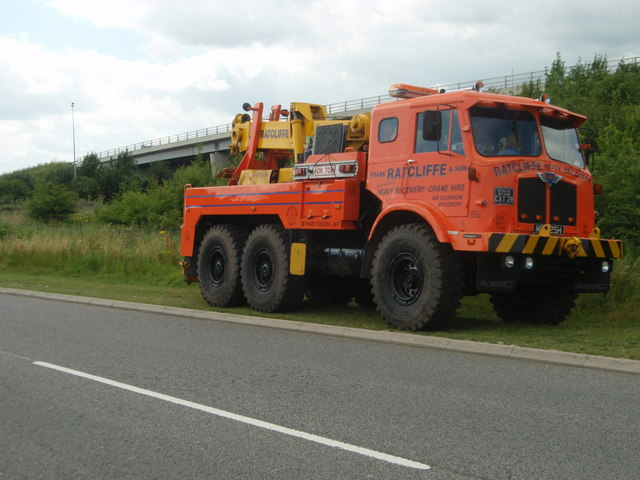
AEC Militant Mk III

== See also ==
- Armoured recovery vehicle
