= Rodoviária do Tejo =

Logo of Rodoviária do Tejo, S.A.

Rodoviária do Tejo, S.A. is a regional bus company in Portugal.

== History ==
The company was founded in 1860 as João Clara & Companhia (Irmãos) Limitada and later became Claras Transportes S.A.R.L. In 1975, the company was nationalized as part of Rodoviária Nacional and became the 'Passenger Managing Centre' (CEP) number 4. On February 1, 1991, the company was privatized, becoming Rodoviária do Tejo, S.A.

On 1 July 2015, the company spun off RDO - Rodoviária do Oeste, Lda to handle the Caldas da Rainha-based operations.

== Territory served ==
Rodoviária do Tejo serves the central west area of Portugal, with operations centering on:

- Caldas da Rainha
  - Alcobaça
  - Bombarral
  - Lourinhã
  - Nazaré
  - Peniche
- Leiria
  - Fátima
  - Figueira da Foz
  - Marinha Grande
  - Ourém
- Santarém
  - Alcoentre
  - Almeirim
  - Cartaxo
  - Rio Maior
- Torres Novas
  - Abrantes
  - Chamusca
  - Tomar
