= Rodoviária Nacional =

Portuguese transport company

Rodoviária Nacional was the state-owned bus network in Portugal, resulting from the nationalization, in 1975, of the largest bus operators in the country. The criteria used for nationalization was the fleet size: more than 60 vehicles.

== Operations ==
The services were first organized in ten "Centros Operacionais de Passageiros" (COP) (Passenger Operational Centres) managing the activities of a similar number of nationalized corporate groups, such organization meant a confusing geographical distribution of operations, so still in 1976 a reorganization into nine "Centros de Exploração de Passageiros" (CEP) (Passenger Managing Centres) settled on a more logical regional organization was set up.

In 1977, CEP10 was created for managing hire and special services in Lisbon. This division along with other CEPs started to promote medium to long distance services that would be labeled as "Expresso" from 1979. The CEP10 headquarters and terminal for long distance services was located on former Claras Transportes' station at Av. Casal Ribeiro, opened in 1973. The passenger amenities and ticket booths were located on the ground floor, the arrival and departure lanes on the first underground level, the workshops and depot on the second underground level, parcels and cargo section on third underground level, for such reasons this station was known as "the cave".

In 1984, the most of CEP5 and parts of CEP6 became the DGRL ("Direcção Regional da Grande Lisboa", or Regional Management of Greater Lisbon) split in 4 COPs, the process of fleet reorganization would last until September 1986. Also in 1984, Vila Franca de Xira, Arruda dos Vinhos, Alenquer (all from CEP6), Torres Vedras (CEP4) and Ericeira/Mafra (CEP5) corridors were passed to CEP10. The creation of DGRL along with CEP10 incorporations meant the extinction of CEP5 and CEP6.

A cargo section was also created, operating under the name RNTrans.

== Ultrena ==
This division was created to manage other activities from nationalized companies, such as the floriculture business of Arboricultora (from Caneças), the car hiring operations from Claras, or EVA Hotel (EVA stands for Empresa de Viação Algarve, or Algarve Road Transport Company). The workshops were also managed by Ultrena.

== Numbering ==
The coach fleet was numbered with four digits, corresponding the first to the CEP which the vehicle was affected (if the vehicle belonged to CEP 8, its fleet number would be 8xxx). For CEP 10 fleet, the first digit was a 0 (0xxx), the DGRL was three digit, preceded by the letter L (Lisboa) or CS (Cascais and Sintra) (L-xxx, CS-xxx), with the numbering strictly distributed by chassis manufacturer.

== The RNIP ==
In order to privatize the operator in 1991 RN became RNIP ("Rodoviária Nacional Investimentos e Participações" : RN Investments and Participations), the CEP's were renamed as:

CEP1 - Rodoviária de Entre Douro e Minho (REDM) - managing Northwest of Portugal, from Braga.

CEP2 - Rodoviária da Beira Litoral (RBL) - managing the coast side of central Portugal, from Coimbra.

CEP3 - Rodoviária da Beira Interior (RBI) - managing the inland central Portugal, from Castelo Branco.

CEP4 - Rodoviária do Tejo - managing the regions of middle Tagus (Santarém, Torres Novas, Abrantes, Tomar), Fátima, Leiria and West Region (Caldas da Rainha, Peniche, Alcobaça) from Torres novas.

DGRL (former CEP 5) - Rodoviária de Lisboa (RL) - managing the Lisbon Greater Metropolitan area, the north bank of Tagus (Loures, Alverca, Odivelas, Amadora, Oeiras, Sintra and Cascais) from Lisbon (Av. do Brasil).

CEP6 - Ceased operations in 1984, due to incorporation of its activities on CEP10 and DGRL.

CEP7 - Rodoviária Sul do Tejo (RST) - managing the south bank of Tagus of Lisbon area (Almada, Seixal) from Laranjeiro.

CEP8 - Rodviária do Alentejo - managing the whole Alentejo and most of Ribatejo, from Azeitão.

CEP9 - Rodoviária do Algarve - managing the Algarve region, from Faro.

CEP10 - Rodoviária da Estremadura, managing Vila Franca and Torres Vedras corridors and express services, from Lisboa (Av. Casal Ribeiro).

== Privatization ==
In 1992, the privatization process started, with Rodoviária do Algarve being acquired by Barraqueiro Transportes, REDM by Resende, Caima and Barraqueiro, as well as the cargo sections (that became known as Rodocargo and Transporta).

In 1993, RBL by Barraqueiro, Rodoviária do Tejo by REDM, Joalto and AVIC, RBI by Joalto and Rodoviária do Alentejo by Barraqueiro and Belos family (that recovered their nationalized company).

In 1994, Rodoviária da Estremadura was acquired by Barraqueiro.

Finally in 1995 Rodoviária Sul do Tejo and Rodoviária de Lisboa were privatized, the latter to Innotrans consortium (led by Barraqueiro and supported by Caixa Geral de Depósitos), which subsequently was split through the following companies:

- COP 1 (Amadora, Queluz and Cacém) operations sold to Vimeca (owned by Brazilian Imorey Group) that created the brand Lisboa Transportes for such operations;
- COP 2 and 3 (Caneças, Odivelas, Loures, Sacavém and Santa Iria da Azoia) kept Rodoviária de Lisboa brand and Barraqueiro ownership;
- COP 4 (Cascais and Sintra) sold to Stagecoach.

== Post Privatization ==
Rodoviária do Algarve was immediately renamed as EVA, remembering the nationalized Empresa de Viação Algarve.

Rodoviária Sul do Tejo became, in late 1990s, TST - Transportes Sul do Tejo. Since 2003 is owned by Arriva group, which entered in the Portuguese market in 2000 acquiring some medium-sized operators in the northwest of Portugal.

Rodoviária do Alentejo became Belos Alentejana, Belos Ribatejana and Belos Setubalense. When Belos family left the consortium with Barraqueiro, in early 2000s, Belos Alentejana became again Rodoviária do Alentejo (branded on its fleet simply as Rodoviária), Belos Ribatejana became simply Ribatejana and Belos Setubalense operations were incorporated on TST.

Rodoviária da Estremadura, or simply Estremadura, became a brand for excursion or hiring services from Barraqueiro group, with some coaches affected to Rede de Expressos. The corridors were renamed as Boa Viagem (Vila Franca de Xira, Alenquer, Sobral de Monte Agraço, Arruda dos Vinhos), EVM - Mafrense (Mafra and Ericeira), Barraqueiro Oeste (Torres Vedras, Lourinhã, Cadaval) and Barraqueiro, for Frielas operations.

REDM and RBL operations owned by Caima (Neves family), were taken by Transdev, known respectively as Transdev Norte and Transdev Centro.

RBI brand still exists and is owned by Joalto Group, who sold their operations to Transdev in 2010.

Stagecoach sold its operations to Vimeca owners in the early 2000s and a new operator was born, ScottUrb (an acronym for Sintra Cascais Oeiras - Transportes Terrestres Urbanos, or Terrestrial Urban Transport).
