= July 1902 =

Month in 1902

<<	July 1902					>>
Su	Mo	Tu	We	Th	Fr	Sa
		1	2	3	4	5
6	7	8	9	10	11	12
13	14	15	16	17	18	19
20	21	22	23	24	25	26
27	28	29	30	31

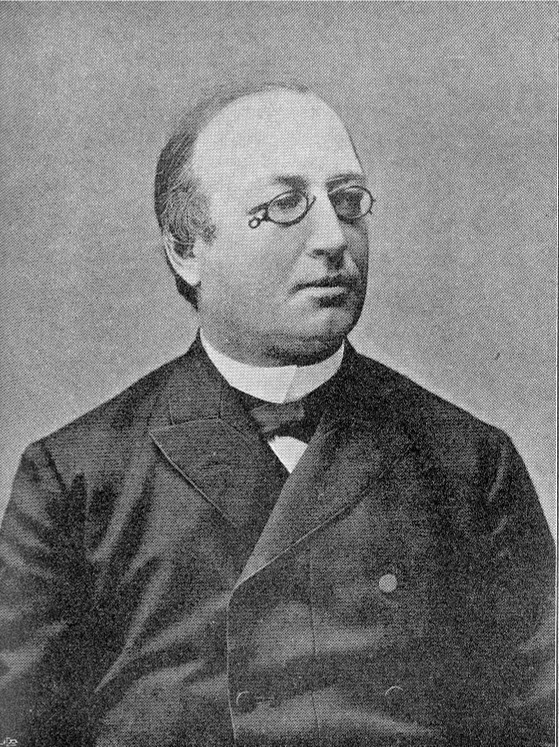
July 5, 1902: Erik Boström returns as Prime Minister of Sweden

The following events occurred in July 1902:

== July 1, 1902 (Tuesday) ==
- The Raymond Stampede, Canada's oldest professional rodeo, was launched in Raymond, Alberta.
- In London, the Prince of Wales (the future King George V of the United Kingdom), reviewed a parade of thousands of British colonial troops who had traveled from their native lands to be present for the coronation of his father, King Edward VII.
- The Philippine Organic Act was enacted by the United States Congress and became law, providing for the election of a Philippine Assembly following the cessation of the Philippine–American War.
- The Biologics Control Act took effect in the United States after being passed by Congress in the wake of the deaths of 13 children (starting on October 26, 1901) from a tainted serum that had been intended to treat diphtheria. The new law authorized the United States Public Health Service to inspect producers and test their medicines, as well as to require the first expiration dates to be placed on health products.
- The uninhabited Henderson Island of the Pitcairn Islands was formally annexed to the British Empire.
- Oliver Robert Hawke Bury became general manager of Great Northern Railway in the United Kingdom, after working for the Buenos Aires and Rosario Railway in Argentina.
- The first national anthem of the Korean Empire, commissioned by the Emperor Gojong, was presented to the imperial court by German composer Franz Eckert, the hymn's author as director of the Korean military band. It would be performed for the first time on September 9, 1902.
- Campbell's dwarf hamster (Phodopus campbelli) was discovered as a distinct species by explorer C. W. Campbell, who collected the first specimen for taxonomists, in Inner Mongolia, near the village of Shaborte.
- Luceafărul ("Evening Star"), a literary magazine in the Romanian language, was published for the first time, in Budapest.
- Born: William Wyler, Swiss-American film director, in Mülhausen, Elsass-Lothringen, German Empire (now Mulhouse, Alsace-Lorraine in France), under the name Wilhelm Weiller (d. 1981)
- Died: Anthony Giuseppe, an immigrant involved in the coal miners' strike, died after he was shot, apparently by accident, by Coal and Iron Police at a Lehigh Valley Coal Company colliery in Old Forge, Lackawanna County, Pennsylvania.

== July 2, 1902 (Wednesday) ==
- The Wimbledon tennis tournament concluded, with British players Laurence Doherty and Muriel Robb taking the men's and women's singles titles.
- United States Secretary of War Elihu Root telegraphed an order abolishing the position of Governor-General of the Philippines in recognition of the end of the Philippine–American War.
- Adolphe Alexandre Chaillet received the first patent for the "Shelby lamp", invented by him in 1897 while in the employ of the Shelby Electric Works in Shelby, Ohio.

== July 3, 1902 (Thursday) ==
- Less than four years after the Spanish–American War ended, the United States and Spain signed a "treaty of amity, commerce and navigation" at Madrid.
- Ministerial Party candidate Henry Garde won the by-election for Maryborough in Queensland, Australia, following the death of Charles Hastings Barton a few weeks earlier. On the same day, Digby Denham retained Oxley for the Ministerial party in the by-election caused by the death of Samuel Grimes.

== July 4, 1902 (Friday) ==
- U.S. President Theodore Roosevelt issued a complete amnesty for all Filipinos who had taken up arms against the United States during the Philippine Revolution.
- Thirty Bulgarian civilians were killed by troops of Turkey at the frontier between the two nations.
- The Pacific Electric Railway opened an interurban line between Los Angeles and Long Beach, California.
- Born:
  - Meyer Lansky, Polish-American mobster known as the "Mob's Accountant", in Grodno, Russian Empire, as Meier Suchowlański (d. 1983)
  - George Murphy, American dancer, actor, and politician, in New Haven, Connecticut (d. 1992)
- Died: Swami Vivekananda, 39, Indian religious leader, during meditation practice. He had previously predicted that he would not reach the age of forty.

== July 5, 1902 (Saturday) ==
- Following the resignation of Fredrik von Otter, Erik Gustaf Boström became Prime Minister of Sweden for a second time, having previously served from 1891 to 1900.
- At least 500,000 dinners were served to Londoners to celebrate the Coronation of Edward VII and Alexandra, in an exercise supervised by Sir Thomas Lipton even though the ceremony had been postponed until August because of the King's illness.
- The only Test cricket match ever played at Bramall Lane, Sheffield in England was won by the touring Australian XI.
- U.S. President Theodore Roosevelt issued an executive order forbidding federal civil service employees from using outside influence in attempts to get promoted.

== July 6, 1902 (Sunday) ==
- Maria Goretti, an 11-year-old girl living in Ancona in Italy, died the day after she was fatally stabbed by an 18-year-old neighbor, Alessandro Serenelli, when she resisted his romantic advances. Before dying, Maria forgave her killer. Serenelli went to prison for 27 years and, after his release, would ask for and receive forgiveness from Maria's mother, Assunta Goretti. Serenelli would enter a monastery and become well known as Father Stephano. He and Mrs. Goretti lived to see the beatification of Maria. After verification of miracles attributed to her, the canonization of Saint Maria Goretti by Pope Pius XII would take place on June 24, 1950.
- Born: Wiktoria Goryńska, Austrian-Polish artist and resistance leader against the Nazi German invasion, in Vienna (d. 1945 at the Ravensbrück concentration camp)

== July 7, 1902 (Monday) ==
- Joseph Chamberlain, the British Secretary of State for the Colonies, sustained head injuries in an accident while a passenger in a horse-drawn carriage and under convalescent care for the next 10 days. A historian would later note of Chamberlain that "during that time two events took place which, if he had been up and about, might conceivably have taken a different turning." The British Prime Minister, Lord Salisbury, chose the moment of Chamberlain's absence to resign and to ask King Edward VII to appoint Salisbury's nephew, Lord Balfour, as his successor.

== July 8, 1902 (Tuesday) ==
- The United States Reclamation Service, now the United States Bureau of Reclamation, was established within the Geological Survey of the Department of the Interior as the first federal agency to acquire the rights and distribution of the American water supply.

== July 9, 1902 (Wednesday) ==
- The Kingdom of Siam (now Thailand) ceded control of four parts of the southern Malay Peninsula to the control of the British Empire. The sultanates of Kedah, Perlis, Kelantan and Terengganu were incorporated into British Malaya and are now part of Malaysia.
- Horace Gray, an Associate Justice of the Supreme Court of the United States, informed U.S. President Theodore Roosevelt of his retirement after 20 years of service. Gray died two months later, on September 15.
- By a vote of 307 to 234, the Chamber of Deputies in France voted to invalidate the election of Count Jean de Castellane based on evidence of his acceptance of bribes.
- The United States began negotiations with Colombia for a treaty to construct a canal across the northernmost departamento of Colombia, the Departamento del Istmo, which would later secede to become the Republic of Panama.

== July 10, 1902 (Thursday) ==
- The Rolling Mill Mine disaster in Johnstown, Pennsylvania, United States, resulted in the deaths of 112 miners. Most were killed by methane gas poisoning following an explosion.
- The uninhabited atoll Oeno Island was formally annexed to the British Empire.
- Born: Kurt Alder, German-Polish chemist and Nobel Prize laureate, in Königshütte, German Empire (now Chorzów, Poland) (d. 1958)

== July 11, 1902 (Friday) ==
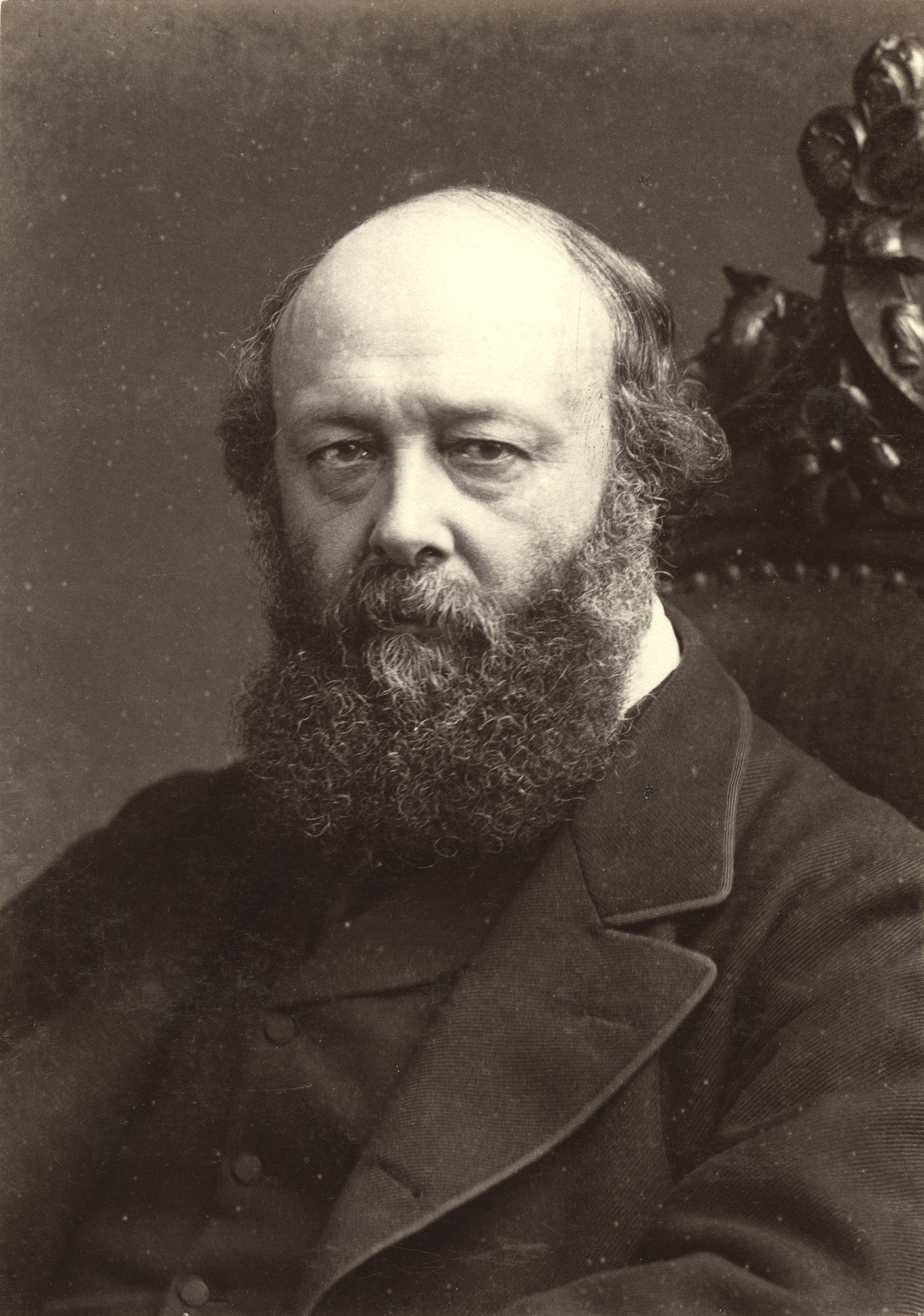
July 11, 1902: Robert Gascoyne-Cecil, Lord Salisbury, retires...

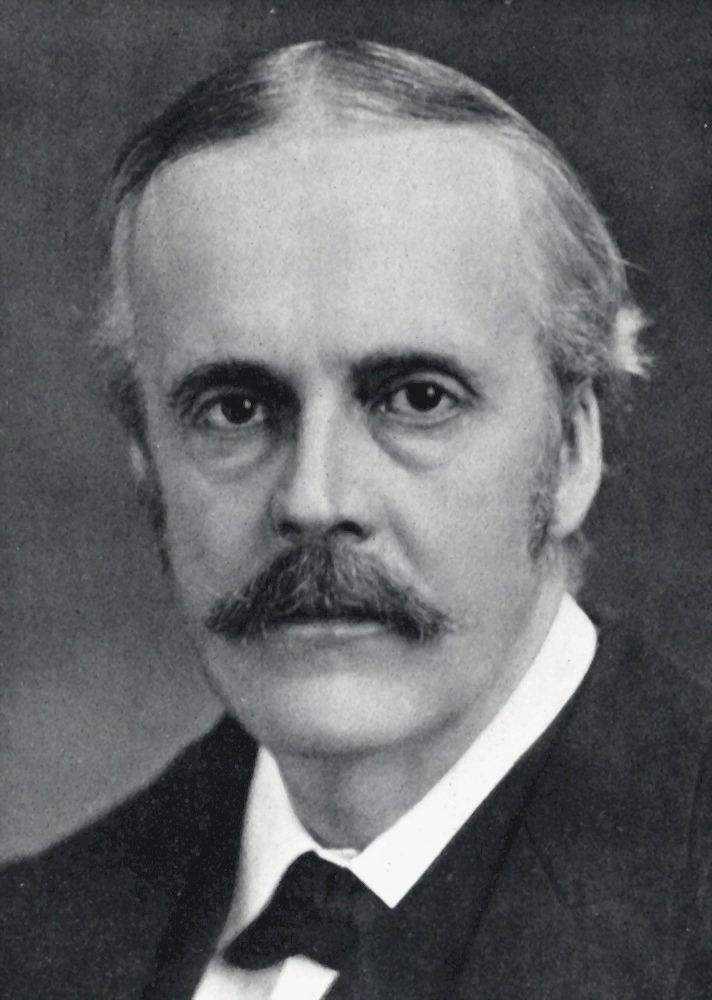
... and is succeeded as Prime Minister of the United Kingdom by his nephew, Arthur Balfour

- The British Prime Minister, Lord Salisbury, retired for health reasons, in order to be replaced by his nephew, Arthur Balfour.
- The Order of the Garter was conferred by King Edward VII of the United Kingdom on Archduke Franz Ferdinand of Austria.
- The town of Maryville, Illinois was incorporated.
- Born: Rolf Widerøe, Norwegian accelerator physicist, in Oslo (d. 1996)

== July 12, 1902 (Saturday) ==
- Lord Kitchener and John French, leaders of the British victory in the Second Boer War in South Africa, were given a heroes' welcome and a parade in London upon their return to the United Kingdom.
- The Columbia Amusement Company, which set the standard for the traveling burlesque shows for the next 25 years, was formed at the Columbia Theatre in New York City. The "Columbia Wheel" guaranteed a rotating series of burlesque acts to travel a circuit of theaters, with new companies starting tours each month.
- Arthur Balfour took office as the new Prime Minister of the United Kingdom.
- The first of the Neuquén–Cipolletti bridges on Argentina's Buenos Aires Great Southern Railway was opened. The first locomotive to pass over it, number 205, was driven by Antonio Mazzarolo.

== July 13, 1902 (Sunday) ==
- Liang Cheng was appointed as the Chinese Empire's minister (ambassador) to the United States. He arrived in the States on July 19 and would serve until 1907.
- King Victor Emmanuel III of Italy arrived in Saint Petersburg for his first official visit to the Russian Empire as the reigning monarch.

== July 14, 1902 (Monday) ==
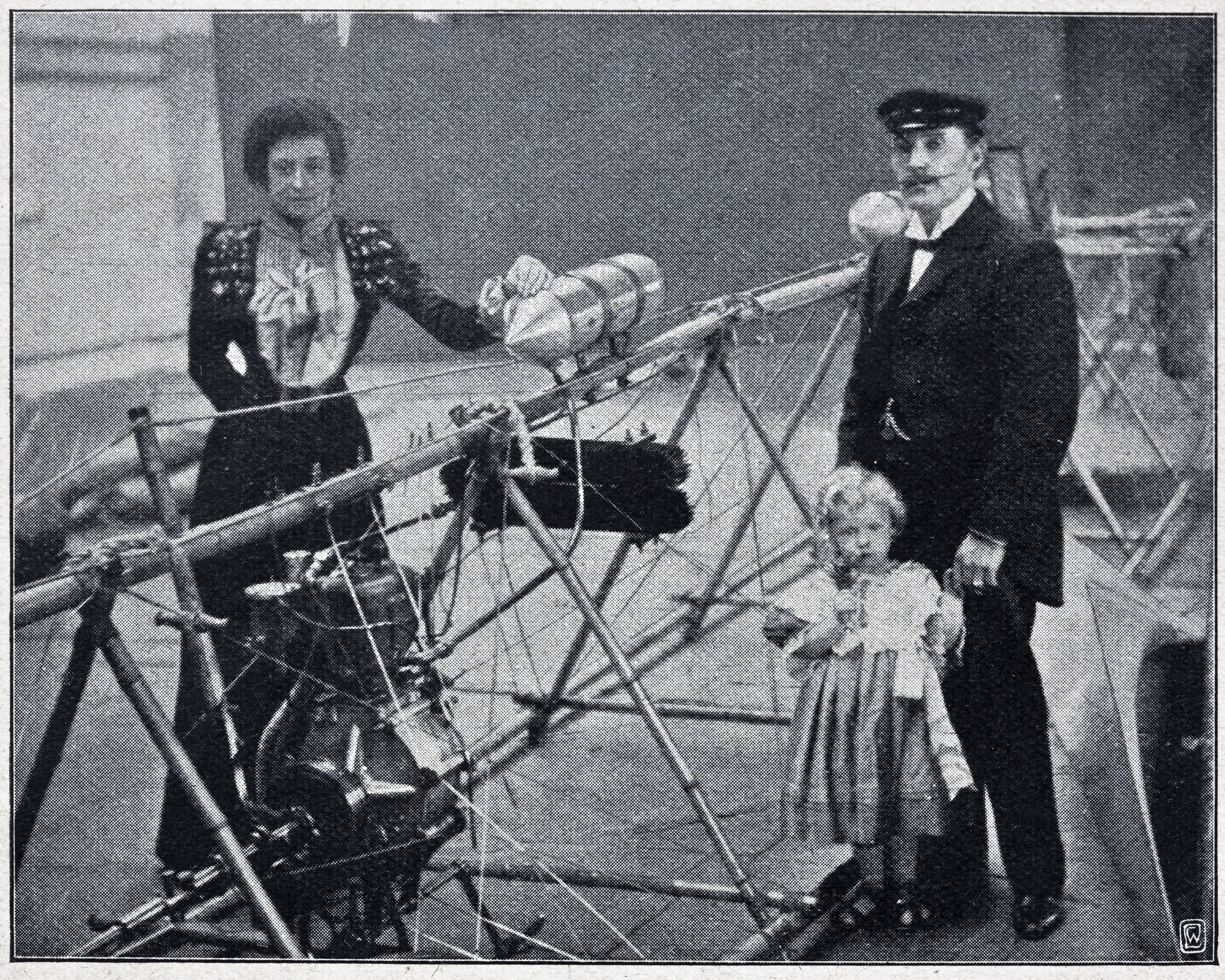
Mrs. and Mr. Spencer

- Sir Michael Hicks Beach resigned his portfolio as the British Chancellor of the Exchequer.
- St Mark's Campanile, the 400-year-old bell tower of St Mark's Basilica in Venice, completely collapsed, demolishing the logetta and killing the caretaker's cat.
- Rose Isabel Spencer, the wife of English aeronaut Stanley Spencer became the first woman to pilot a motorized aircraft. Mrs. Spencer guided Spencer's balloon airship successfully around Crystal Palace in London.
- Born: Josef Toufar, Czech Roman Catholic priest who was persecuted by the Communist government of Czechoslovakia as part of a campaign to discredit organized religion, in Arnolec, Bohemia (d. 1950)

== July 15, 1902 (Tuesday) ==
- The Australian ghost town of Shuttleton, New South Wales was founded by several copper mining companies for their employees, and was virtually uninhabited 40 years later after the companies had closed.
- Born: Edward Howell, English-Australian stage, film and TV actor, in Bromley, Kent, England (b. 1986)

== July 16, 1902 (Wednesday) ==
- U.S. Army Brigadier General Jacob H. Smith received a reprimand and a forced retirement from the service, on orders of the U.S. Commander-in-chief, President Theodore Roosevelt, for having issued "kill and burn" orders in the Philippines.
- The Pilgrims Society, an organization with a mission "to promote good-will, good-fellowship, and everlasting peace between the United States and the United Kingdom, was founded with the creation of The Pilgrims of Great Britain at a meeting in London at the Carlton Hotel by English aviation pioneers Harry Brittain and Charles Rolls, as well as United States Army and Confederate States Army officer Joseph Wheeler and British Army officer Bryan Mahon. Its American counterpart, The Pilgrims of the United States, would be founded six months later on January 13, 1903 at the Waldorf Astoria Hotel in New York City.
- The town of Lonsdale, Minnesota was created by auction of 80 acres of lots platted out for sale by the Milwaukee Land Company and corporate owner Thomas Wilby, in order to create a train depot and a stop on the Chicago, Milwaukee, and St. Paul Railway. One hundred years later, the population had grown from 271 people to almost 1,500, and the population now is over 4,200.
- Born:
  - Alexander Luria, Russian neuropsychologist, in Kazan, Russia (d. 1977)
  - Mary Philbin, American silent film actress, in Chicago (d. 1993)

== July 17, 1902 (Thursday) ==
- American engineer Willis Carrier successfully submitted his plans for the first modern air conditioning system to be installed, with the first practical means of controlling humidity in addition to the other functions of cooling, circulating and cleansing the air. The first Carrier system was installed during the summer at the Sackett-Wilhelms Lithographing & Publishing Company premises in Brooklyn, New York and refined. Carrier filed a patent application for his invention, "Apparatus for treating air", on September 16, 1904, and U.S. Patent No. 808,897 was granted on January 2, 1906. and, in 1915, founded the Carrier Engineering Corporation, one of the world's largest manufacturers of heating, ventilating and air conditioning systems.
- Lord Hopetoun, Governor-General of Australia since the foundation of the Commonwealth, departed Australia after more than 18 months in office and sailed from Brisbane with his family on his return to the United Kingdom. Lord Hopetoun was succeeded by Lord Tennyson, the Governor of South Australia.
- The Earl Cadogan announced his resignation as Lord Lieutenant of Ireland after seven years as the island's governor within the United Kingdom of Great Britain and Ireland. He would be succeeded on August 11 by the Earl of Dudley.
- The current regulation U.S. Army “saber for all officers, Model 1902" was adopted on July 17, 1902, by authority of General Order No. 81. The M1902 officer's sabre remains the standard within the United States Army for ceremonial purposes.
- The Texas Mexican Railway was converted to a standard gauge.

== July 18, 1902 (Friday) ==
- A spokesman for Buckingham Palace announced that the coronation of Edward VII and Alexandra as King and Queen Consort would take place in London on August 9.
- A public sea-water bath was opened at Kalvebod Brygge in Copenhagen.
- Born:
  - Chill Wills (Theodore Childress Wills), American film actor, best known for The Alamo and providing the voice of Francis the Talking Mule in a series of film comedies, in Seagoville, Texas (d. 1976)
  - Armitage Trail (pen name for Maurice R. Coons), American crime and detective fiction author known for his 1929 novel Scarface, adapted to film in 1932 and in 1983, in Madison, Nebraska (d. 1930 from heart failure)
  - Dimitar Panov, Bulgarian film and TV actor, in Veliko Tarnovo, Bulgaria (d. 1985)
- Died:
  - Hamoud bin Mohammed, 49, Sultan of Zanzibar since 1896 (b. 1853)
  - Mark W. Bullard, 79, American pioneer who established homesteads in the American west, including the town of Lakeview, Oregon (b. 1822)

== July 19, 1902 (Saturday) ==
- A rebellion on Easter Island by Moisés Tuʻu Hereveri against the Chilean administrator (Horacio Cooper White) and the recognized traditional King, Simeon Riro Kāinga, was suppressed by the arrival of the Chilean Navy ship Baquedano.
- Born: Ilya Vlasenko, Ukrainian Soviet Army officer and Hero of the Soviet Union for his leadership during the Battle of the Dnieper, in Dobrush, Russian Empire (now Dobrush, Belarus) (d. 1963)

== July 20, 1902 (Sunday) ==
- The first international match ever played by Argentina's national soccer football team took place in Uruguay's capital, Montevideo, at a field in the Paso del Molino barrio, where the Argentines were the guests of Uruguay's national team, which was also playing its first international match. Argentina won, 6 to 0, with the first-ever goal having been scored by Carlos Edgard Dickinson. Both national teams would later win FIFA World Cup titles, Uruguay in 1930 and Argentina in 1978, 1986 and 2022.
- Ali bin Hamud was proclaimed as the eighth Sultan of Zanzibar, two days after the death of his father, the Sultan Hamoud bin Mohammed. Alexander Stuart Rogers, a British colonial official, was appointed as the regent for the Sultan until Ali reached the age of 21.

== July 21, 1902 (Monday) ==
- Fluminense, a four-time national soccer football champion in Brazil, was founded in Rio de Janeiro.
- A German excursion steamer, Primus, sank in the Elbe River after being cut in two accidentally by a Hamburg America Line tugboat, Hansa, and 101 of the 206 people on board drowned.
- U.S. Army Major General Arthur MacArthur Jr., formerly the Governor-General of the Philippines, began his first job since his return to the United States, as commander of the United States Army's Department of the East.
- Born: Joseph Kesselring, American playwright, in New York City (d. 1967)

== July 22, 1902 (Tuesday) ==
- The International Council for the Exploration of the Sea, the world's oldest intergovernmental science organization, was founded in Copenhagen.
- The British Museum Act was given royal assent, empowering the trustees to remove "newspapers and other printed matter which are rarely required for public use" to a remote storage location. These would form the basis of the British Library Newspapers Division at Colindale, London. Other legislation given royal assent on the same day were the University of Wales Act, the Musical Copyright Act, the Labour Bureaux Act, the Prison Officers Act, the Pauper Children Act and the Immoral Traffic Act.
- Italian-born American prospector Felix Pedro discovered gold in an area north of the small trading post settlement of Fairbanks in the Alaska Territory, setting off the Fairbanks Gold Rush, the second wave of gold fever in Alaska, three years after the Klondike Gold Rush of 1896 to 1899.
- The town of Apache, Oklahoma, was incorporated in the course of allowing non-Indians to settle in the Kiowa, Comanche, and Apache Reservation in the former "Indian Territory" that is now the state of Oklahoma.
- Died: Thomas Croke, 78, Irish Catholic bishop of Auckland, New Zealand, and Archbishop of Cashel in Ireland (b. 1824)

== July 23, 1902 (Wednesday) ==
- The capsizing of a Chinese steamship, on the Xi River in China's Guangdong province, killed 200 people.
- Bournemouth Corporation Tramways began operating in Bournemouth, Hampshire, England.

== July 24, 1902 (Thursday) ==
- Born: Esther Averill, American children's book writer known for her series of The Cat Club books, in Bridgeport, Connecticut (d. 1992)

== July 25, 1902 (Friday) ==
- Boxer Bob Fitzsimmons failed in his bid to recover the title of World Heavyweight Champion of boxing, when he was defeated by James J. Jeffries with an eighth-round knockout in San Francisco.
- Club Olimpia, the first professional soccer football team in Paraguay, was founded in Asunción by Dutch merchant William Paats. It would win 38 league championships in its first 100 years of existence and three South American championships in the Copa Libertadores competition.
- France's President Émile Loubet signed a decree under the Association loi de 1901, seizing Roman Catholic schools in Alsace-Lorraine.
- The U.S. state of Arkansas hanged seven condemned prisoners in a single day.
- Died: Alfred Choubrac, 48, French painter and illustrator, from pneumonia (b. 1853)

== July 26, 1902 (Saturday) ==
- General Anténor Firmin, who had attempted to lead a revolution in Haiti for the formation of a union of Caribbean states, was declared an outlaw by the government of President Pierre Théoma Boisrond-Canal.
- Italy and Switzerland resumed diplomatic relations after mediation of their differences by Germany.
- Died: Charles Kendall Adams, 67, American educator and encyclopedia editor (b. 1835)

== July 27, 1902 (Sunday) ==
- The first major libel case of the 20th century was prompted by the publication, in the Philadelphia North American newspaper, of a false report that Cheyenne Indian Chief White Buffalo had been arrested and was awaiting trial for the murder of three white women as part of a hate crime. The story, written by W. R. Draper of Wichita, Kansas, was purchased from Draper by the newspaper and then reprinted in other newspapers across the United States. White Buffalo and the founder of the Carlisle Indian School traveled to Philadelphia to refute the article and the North American printed a retraction, as well as filing criminal charges and a civil suit against Draper as a deterrent against other people who would submit a false article.
- A powerful earthquake struck Santa Barbara County, California.
- Born: Yaroslav Halan, Ukrainian Soviet Communist and playwright, in Dünow, Austria-Hungary (now in Dynów in Poland) (d. 1949, assassinated by independence activists)
- Died: Gustave Trouvé, 63, French electrical engineer who invented miniature and less heavy electric motors and batteries, died from sepsis after accidentally cutting his thumb and index finger while working on his final invention for ultraviolet light therapy for treatment of skin diseases. (b. 1839)

== July 28, 1902 (Monday) ==
- President José Santos Zelaya of Nicaragua commuted the death sentence imposed on an American physician, Dr. Russell Wilson, by a Nicaraguan military court after Wilson had conspired with revolutionists to overthrow President Zelaya's government.
- A rare earthquake in the Great Plains states affected a 200-square-mile (520 km^{2}) area in northern Nebraska, northwest Iowa, South Dakota, and North Dakota.
- Born:
  - Albert Namatjira, Australian painter, in Hermannsburg, Northern Territory, Australia (d. 1959)
  - Karl Popper, Austrian philosopher, in Vienna (d. 1994)

== July 29, 1902 (Tuesday) ==
- The United Kingdom withdrew all of its claims to sovereignty over the Bay Islands off of the coast of Honduras, recognizing Honduran sovereignty over the six islands of Utila, Roatán, Guanaja, and several smaller islands.
- In the Leeds North by-election in the United Kingdom, brought about by the sitting Conservative MP, William Jackson, having been created Baron Allerton, Liberal candidate Rowland Barran took the seat from the Conservatives with a majority of 758.
- William F Messer was granted a patent (entailings uncertain) for the Lambert Record Company.

== July 30, 1902 (Wednesday) ==
- The militia was used to restore order in Shenandoah, Pennsylvania, after a street fight between striking coal miners and police, which resulted in at least one death.
- The 6th annual Bible Institute began at Earlham College, a Quaker institution in the United States.

== July 31, 1902 (Thursday) ==
- An explosion in an underground coal mine killed 96 men and boys working at a colliery in Mount Kembla, New South Wales in Australia.
- The Midwives Act 1902, regulating the profession of midwifery for the first time in the United Kingdom, was given royal assent and would take effect on April 1, 1903.
- The inaugural Circuit des Ardennes motor race took place near Bastogne, Belgium and was won by British driver Charles Jarrott.
- The lower section of the Great Orme Tramway, the longest funicular railway in the British Isles, was opened at Llandudno, Wales.
