= June 1902 =

Month in 1902

<<	June 1902					>>
Su	Mo	Tu	We	Th	Fr	Sa
1	2	3	4	5	6	7
8	9	10	11	12	13	14
15	16	17	18	19	20	21
22	23	24	25	26	27	28
29	30

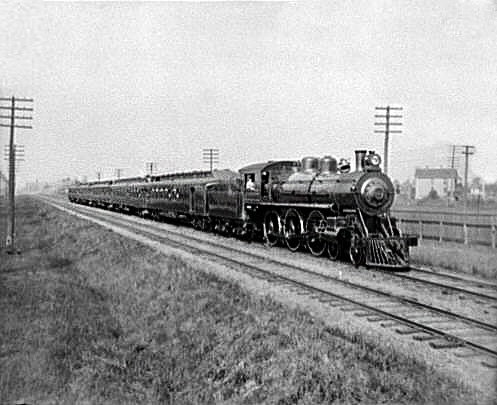
June 15, 1902: The 20th Century Limited begins service

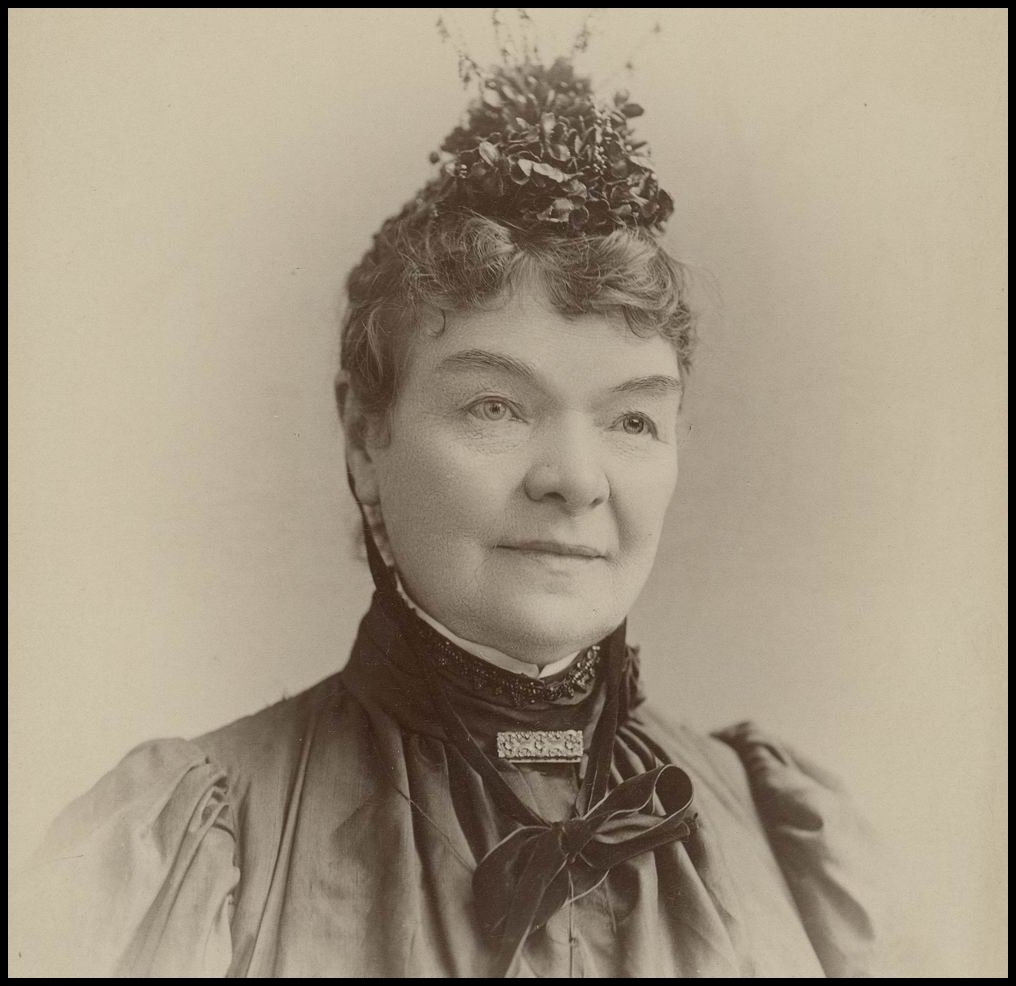
June 12, 1902: Suffragette Mary Lee lives to see Australia grant women the right to vote

June 19, 1902: King Albert of Saxony dies after a 28-year reign

The following events occurred in June 1902:

== June 1, 1902 (Sunday) ==
- Canada's amendment to its Chinese Immigration Act of 1885 took effect, doubling the "head tax" of C$50 to C$100 per person, with exceptions for tourists, diplomats and students. British Columbia, where most of the immigrants initially settled, was allowed to keep half of the tax. In 1903, the rate would be increased to C$500 per person.
- Born: Rear Admiral C. Wade McClusky, U.S. Navy aviator and hero in the Battle of Midway; in Buffalo, New York (d. 1976)

== June 2, 1902 (Monday) ==
- A strike by American anthracite miners in Scranton, Pennsylvania, escalated as maintenance employees join the industrial action by the United Mine Workers.
- Edward Elgar's latest composition, Land of Hope and Glory (adapted from one of Elgar's Pomp and Circumstance Marches with lyrics by A. C. Benson) was performed in public for the first time, by Clara Butt.
- In the election for the governor of the U.S. state of Oregon, Democrat George Earle Chamberlain won with 46.17% of the vote.
- The Congregation of Christian Brothers celebrated its centenary with High Mass at Holy Name Cathedral in Chicago.

== June 3, 1902 (Tuesday) ==
- France's Prime Minister Pierre Waldeck-Rousseau and his cabinet left office following his May 23 announcement.
- Died: John Henry Barrows, 55, American Presbyterian clergyman, President of Oberlin College and proponent of the Parliament of the World's Religions interfaith movement.

== June 4, 1902 (Wednesday) ==
- Eight Welsh coal miners were killed in an accident at Fochrhiw Colliery in Dowlais, Wales.
- Michael Henry Herbert was named as the new British Ambassador to the United States, to succeed the late Lord Pauncefote.

== June 5, 1902 (Thursday) ==
- The 1902 Open Championship golf tournament was won by Sandy Herd.
- Died:
  - Sir Daniel Cooper, 80, English-Australian politician who served as the first speaker of the legislature of the Colony of New South Wales when the colony was first granted self-government in 1856; at the time, the colony included the territory of the present states of New South Wales and Queensland (which was made a separate colony in 1859). (b. 1821)
  - Louis J. Weichmann, 60, a leading prosecution witness in the trial of the co-conspirators of John Wilkes Booth in the attempted assassination of various members of the U.S. government in 1865 (b. 1842)

== June 6, 1902 (Friday) ==
- Émile Combes formed a government as the new Prime Minister of France.
- A new constitution for the Commonwealth of Virginia, one of the 45 states of the United States, was approved by the Virginia Constitutional Commission by a vote of 90 to 10. The new constitution provided for literacy tests for African Americans and other person who was not a former member of the Confederate States Army nor the children or descendants of a Confederate States Army veteran.

== June 7, 1902 (Saturday) ==
- The SS Thomas Wilson, an American whaleback freighter operating in the Great Lakes, collided with the steamer George Hadley and sank in minutes, with the loss of its cargo and nine crew members.
- Italy took possession of a concession in Tientsin, China, installing a consul.
- On the same day that the meatpackers strike in Chicago was settled, bituminous coal miners went on strike in Virginia and West Virginia.

== June 8, 1902 (Sunday) ==
- The Kīlauea volcano began erupting on the island of Hawaii.
- U.S. President Theodore Roosevelt asked the Commissioner of Labor, Carroll D. Wright, to look into the ongoing coal strike and seek possible solutions. When the employers refused to negotiate, Roosevelt was dissuaded from intervening.
- Born:
  - James S. Rockefeller, U.S. banker and former captain of the U.S. rowing team that won the gold medal in the 1924 Summer Olympics (d. 2004)
  - James T. Berryman, American editorial cartoonist and Pulitzer Prize winner; in Washington D.C. (d. 1971)
- Died: Charles Ingalls, 66, American farmer known from the Little House on the Prairie books written by his daughter, Laura Ingalls Wilder, and the television series adaptation, in which he was portrayed by Michael Landon. (b. 1836)

== June 9, 1902 (Monday) ==
- Mexican soldiers massacred almost 200 men, women and children of the Yaqui Indian tribe.
- Gustav Mahler's Symphony No. 3 was performed in its entirety for the first time, at Krefeld, Germany, conducted by the composer.
- Cuba's President Tomás Estrada Palma granted amnesty to all American citizens who were incarcerated in Cuba, whether convicted of a crime or awaiting trial. Jurisdiction over the prisoners was transferred to the United States government.
- Professor Woodrow Wilson was chosen as President of Princeton University, succeeding Francis L. Patton.
- Born: Nehemiah "Skip" James, African-American blues musician; in Bentonia, Mississippi (d. 1969)

== June 10, 1902 (Tuesday) ==
- Thomas Thornycroft's statue of Boadicea and Her Daughters, erected on Victoria Embankment in London, was made visible to the public by removal of the surrounding hoardings, without an official unveiling. The sculptor had died 17 years earlier.
- Died:
  - Jacint Verdaguer, 57, Spanish Catalan poet and proponent of Catalan nationalism (b. 1845)
  - Auguste Schmidt, 68, German educator, novelist and feminist (b. 1833)

== June 11, 1902 (Wednesday) ==
- Arthur Lynch of Ireland, who was elected to the House of Commons of the United Kingdom in absentia while living in Paris, was indicted for high treason for becoming an officer for the Army of the South African Republic while the South Africans were fighting against the British Army during the Second Boer War. Lynch, an Irish war correspondent, had joined the enemy army after being persuaded that the United Kingdom's participation in the war was improper, then fled before he could be captured. Nominated as a candidate for the Irish Parliamentary Party, Lynch won election in 1901 from the Galway constituency.
- The Eight-Nation Alliance powers affected by the 1900 Boxer Rebellion in China agreed to reduce the Chinese Empire's indemnity to the affected nations by ten million dollars.
- An earthquake of magnitude 8.0 struck in the seabed beneath the Sea of Okhotsk in Russia.
- In Japan, the Chūō rail line from Ochanomizu to Shiojiri was completed.
- Died: Sidi Ali III ibn al-Husayn, 84, the Bey of Tunis during the North African kingdom's period as a French protectorate. Ali III was succeeded by his son, Muhammad IV al-Hadi. (b. 1817)

== June 12, 1902 (Thursday) ==
- The Commonwealth Franchise Act 1902 received Royal Assent, granting universal suffrage for federal elections in Australia for British subjects over 21 years of age who have lived in Australia for six months. This made Australia the second country to grant women's suffrage at a national level and the first to allow women to stand for parliament. However, indigenous people from Australia, Asia, Africa and the Pacific Islands (with the exception of Māori) were disqualified.
- France's Chamber of Deputies voted its confidence in the new government of Prime Minister Émile Combes.

== June 13, 1902 (Friday) ==
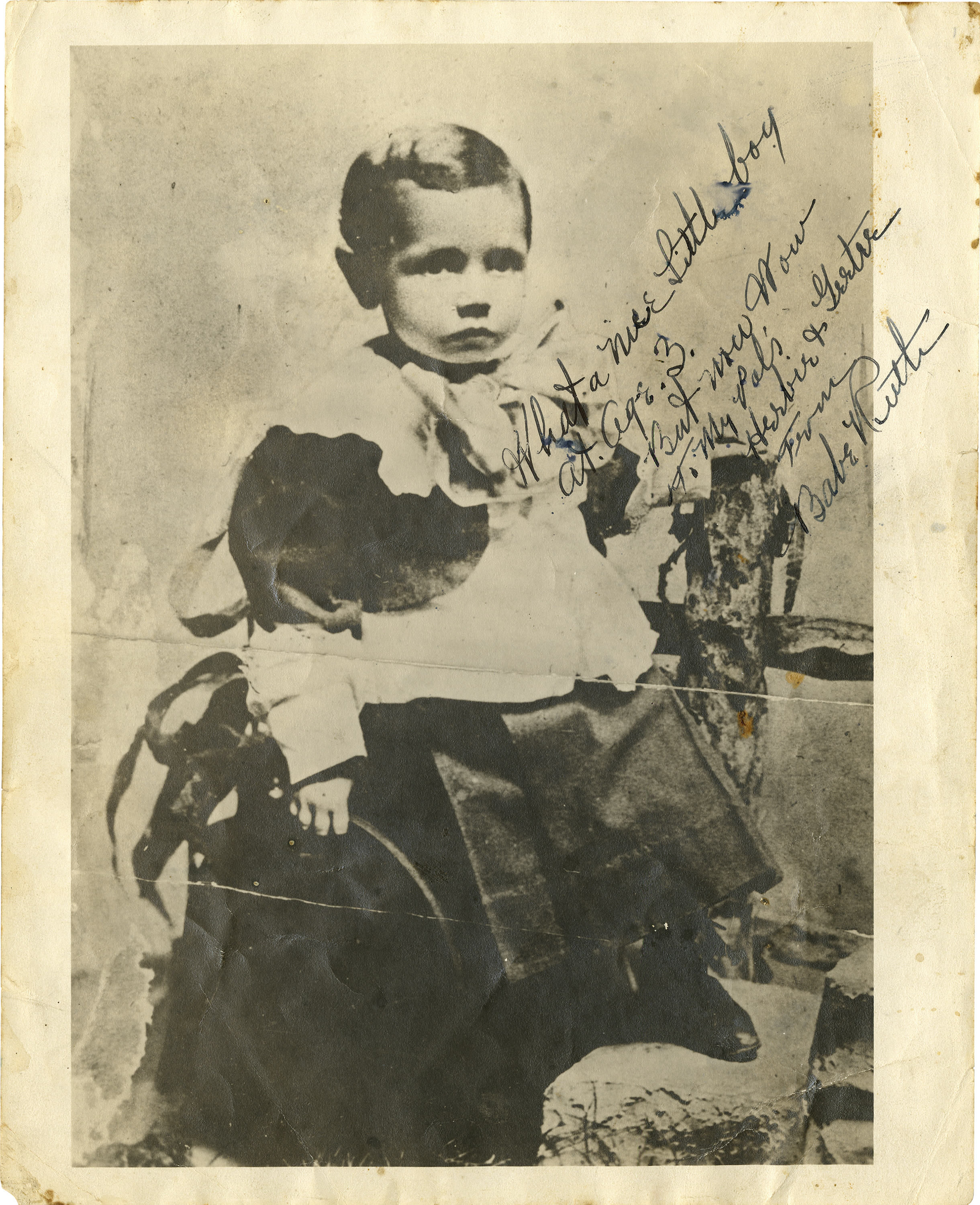
Future baseball star George Ruth

- George Herman Ruth, Jr., an uncontrollable 7-year-old truant, was turned over to the St. Mary's Industrial School for Boys in Baltimore after his mother was unable to take care of him. George would spend the next 12 years living and working at the school, and develop his athletic ability to become one of the greatest Major League Baseball players in history and acquire the nickname "Babe Ruth".
- The U.S. state of Texas passed an appropriations bill for one million dollars to excavate a ship channel to turn the town of Houston (population 45,000) into a deepwater port, despite the town's distance of 50 miles (80 km) from the Gulf of Mexico. The channel was constructed from Galveston to the city of Harrisburg, which would be annexed into Houston in 1926. Houston is now the fourth-most populous city in the United States with a population of 2.3 million people and a metropolitan area of seven million.
- The Minnesota Mining & Manufacturing Company, now known as 3M, was founded by five investors in Two Harbors, Minnesota. The company was formally incorporated almost five weeks later on July 15.

== June 14, 1902 (Saturday) ==
- Prince Ferdinand of Bulgaria and Tsar Nicholas II of the Russian Empire signed a military alliance providing for mutual aid in the event of an attack on either one of them by the Kingdom of Romania.

== June 15, 1902 (Sunday) ==
- The New York Central Railroad inaugurated its 20th Century Limited passenger train service between Chicago and New York City. Aimed at business travelers, it offered a barbershop and secretarial services.

== June 16, 1902 (Monday) ==
- Grane defeated Odds 2-0, to win the final of the 1902 Norwegian Football Cup.
- In a letter to Gottlob Frege, Bertrand Russell first described a mathematical problem that would later become known as Russell's paradox.
- Cuba's first ambassador to the United States, Gonzalo de Quesada, was received at the White House by President Theodore Roosevelt.
- Born: Barbara McClintock, American geneticist, recipient of the Nobel Prize in Physiology or Medicine; in Hartford, Connecticut (d. 1992)

== June 17, 1902 (Tuesday) ==
- Norwich City Football Club was formed at a meeting at the Criterion Cafe in Norwich.
- U.S. President Theodore Roosevelt signed the Newlands Reclamation Act into law, providing irrigation for the dry land of 10 of the western U.S. states and three U.S. territories (Arizona, New Mexico and Oklahoma).

== June 18, 1902 (Wednesday) ==
- HMAS Encounter, a British Royal Navy cruiser, was launched at HM Dockyard Devonport. Lady Sturges Jackson, wife of Vice-Admiral Sir Thomas Sturges Jackson, Admiral-Superintendent of Devonport, performed the ceremony.
- Died:
  - Samuel Butler, 66, English novelist known for his 1872 novel Erewhon (b. 1835)
  - James Macaulay, 85, Scottish physician, editor and crusader against vivisection (b. 1817)

== June 19, 1902 (Thursday) ==
- The United States Senate voted, 42 to 34, to build a canal between the Atlantic and Pacific Oceans across the Isthmus of Panama, rather than across Nicaragua, the preference of the United States House of Representatives.
- Died:
  - King Albert of Saxony, 74, German monarch within the German Empire since 1873 (b. 1828). He was succeeded by his 69-year-old brother, King George, who would reign for two years.
  - Lord Acton, 68, British historian and political adviser known for coining the phrase "absolute power corrupts absolutely" (b. 1834)

== June 20, 1902 (Friday) ==
- The White House in Washington, D.C. announced that it would temporarily discontinue visits by the general public and state dinners because of extensive remodeling and construction to be made on the first and second floors of the U.S. presidential residence and offices. Effective Saturday, "only Cabinet Officers, Senators, Representatives and such other callers as may have business of such urgency as to require his personal attention" would be received by President Theodore Roosevelt, pending completion of the renovation of the Executive Mansion and the building of a new Executive Office Building.

== June 21, 1902 (Saturday) ==
- Russia withdrew from further governing of the Chinese city of Tianjin by the Eight-Nation Alliance.

== June 22, 1902 (Sunday) ==
- Twenty-five people were killed and 35 seriously injured when lightning struck a church during a funeral service at the village of Piñeiro in the Province of Ourense, Spain.
- Born: Henri Deglane, French wrestler who won the gold medal in Greco-Roman wrestling in the 1924 Summer Olympics, then went on to a career in U.S. professional wrestling as the 1931 heavyweight champion of the American Wrestling Association (AWA); in Limoges, Haute-Vienne (d. 1975)

== June 23, 1902 (Monday) ==
- Lord Milner was sworn into office as the first British colonial governor of the Orange River Colony, formerly the independent Orange Free State, which ceased to be a republic following its May 31 surrender to the British Empire to close the Second Boer War. Milner had previously been administrator of British-occupied portions of the republic before the creation of the colonial government.
- The 1902 Wimbledon tennis tournament opened at the All England Lawn Tennis and Croquet Club at Wimbledon, a district of London.
- Hurricane Two made landfall near Corpus Christi, Texas, with winds of 70 mph.

== June 24, 1902 (Tuesday) ==
- The Target department store chain was founded, as Minneapolis financier George Dayton acquired Goodfellow's Dry Goods Store. After moving into a newly built six-story building in 1903, Goodfellow's would be renamed the Dayton Department Store and would open the first Target store on May 1, 1962, in the nearby suburb of Roseville.
- King Edward VII of the United Kingdom underwent an emergency appendectomy, and his coronation, scheduled for June 26, was postponed indefinitely.
- Born: Juan Antonio Yanes, Venezuelan sports executive and co-founder (in 1945) of the Venezuelan Professional Baseball League as owner of the Patriotas de Venezuela; in Caracas (d. 1987)
- Died: George Leake, 45, Premier of Western Australia, of pneumonia (b. 1856). Leake remains the only Western Australian state premier ever to die in office.

== June 25, 1902 (Wednesday) ==
- The Populist Party in the United States allied with the Democratic Party in both Nebraska and South Dakota, where the formerly rival parties agreed on a "fusion ticket" for a gubernatorial nominee.
- Born: Yasuhito, Prince Chichibu, member of the Japanese royal family and Japanese Imperial Navy admiral; in Tokyo. The second son of Emperor Yoshihito and younger brother of the Emperor Hirohito, he was second in line for succession during Yoshihito's reign from 1912 to 1925, but never the crown prince. He died of tuberculosis in 1950.

== June 26, 1902 (Thursday) ==
- King Edward VII of the United Kingdom instituted the Order of Merit. Membership was restricted to no more than 24 British Commonwealth citizens at any one time. The first 12 people honoured included heroes of the recently concluded Second Boer War: Lord Roberts, Lord Wolseley and Lord Kitchener.
- Born: Hugues Cuénod, Swiss operatic tenor; in Corsier-sur-Vevey (d. 2010)

== June 27, 1902 (Friday) ==
- In the U.S. National women's tennis championship, held in Philadelphia, Marion Jones defeated reigning champion Elisabeth Moore 6–1, 1–0, to win the singles title, after Moore became ill and was forced to concede.
- France's government ordered the closing of 120 schools for girls that had been established illegally after the passage of the Religious Associations Law.
- Galveston, Texas, broke a record for rainfall in one day as a result of Hurricane Two.

== June 28, 1902 (Saturday) ==
- The Triple Alliance between Germany, Austria-Hungary, and Italy, originally formed in 1882, was renewed.
- Following the failure of his legislation for reform of voting rights, Fredrik von Otter announced his resignation as Prime Minister of Sweden, along with his entire cabinet. Otter's predecessor, Erik Boström, was asked by King Oscar II to form a new government, which was constituted on July 5.
- Born: Richard Rodgers, American melody composer for stage musicals as part of the songwriting team of Rodgers and Hart, and later for Rodgers and Hammerstein; in New York City (d. 1979)

== June 29, 1902 (Sunday) ==
- The "Paris-Vienna Trail" motor race was won by Marcel Renault (France) driving a Renault in a time of 15 hours, 47 minutes and 43 seconds. The race, in retrospect, is sometimes referred to as the VII Grand Prix de l'ACF.

== June 30, 1902 (Monday) ==
- The 1902 Colonial Conference, attended by the premiers of the British Empire's colonies from around the world, was opened by Colonial Secretary Joseph Chamberlain in London. Chamberlain had summoned the administrators, to discuss Imperial Preference, whereby a system of free trade agreements between dominions and colonies within the British Empire might be introduced.
