= Číhošť miracle =

Alleged 1949 miracle in Czechoslovakia

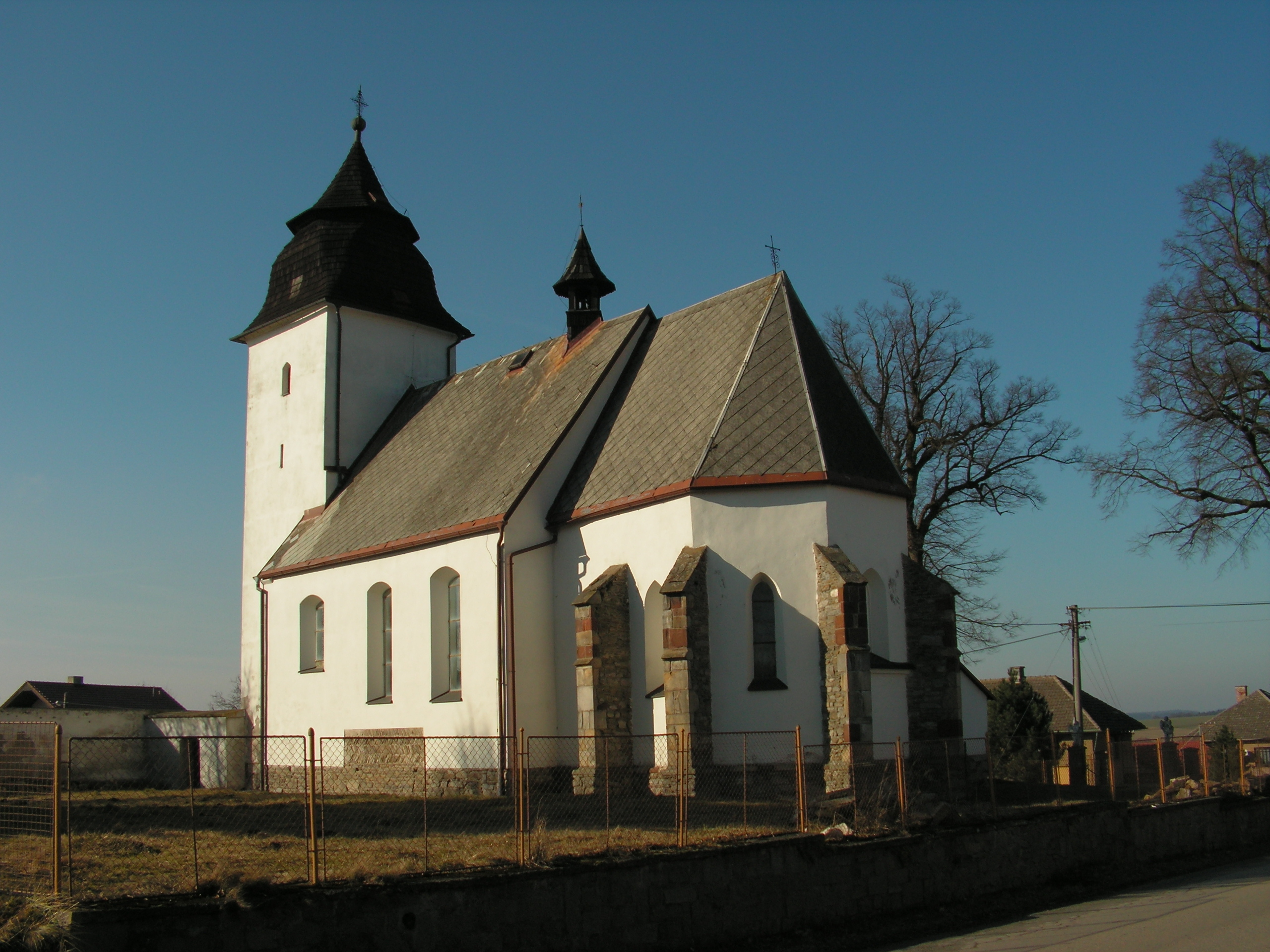
Church of the Assumption of the Virgin Mary in Číhošť

The event commonly referred to as Číhošť miracle happened on 11 December 1949, during the third Sunday in Advent, in the Church of the Assumption of the Virgin Mary in the village of Číhošť, Havlíčkův Brod District, Czechoslovakia. The alleged miracle was used by Communist authorities as a pretext for anti-religious repression. The priest Josef Toufar was tortured and died during the investigation of the event.

== Basic overview ==
During a church service held on 11 December 1949 in the Church of the Assumption of the Virgin Mary in Číhošť, several witnesses noticed that a half-metre long iron cross standing on the main altar moved several times on its own. The next day, one of them notified the priest, Josef Toufar, about the unusual event. Toufar claimed that he didn't notice anything, stating that he was in the pulpit, with his back to the altar and the cross. Later, he recorded the testimonies of 19 witnesses and soon after that, on 21 December, SNB (Czechoslovak National Security Corps) officers arrived to the village to examine the church.

The information about the miracle quickly spread and caught the attention of the authorities of the Communist state established after the coup d'état of 1948 in Czechoslovakia. The StB (State Security) decided to exploit the event for propaganda purposes to discredit the Catholic Church. In January 1950, they arrested Toufar and forced him—under brutal torture—to testify that he faked the miracle by installing a mechanical device leading from the pulpit to the cross. According to their version, he operated the device in order to deceive parishioners. During the interrogation, they took him back to Číhošť to film a falsified reconstruction of the event. Toufar was so badly beaten that in some passages of the film he had to be replaced by another priest. Shortly after that, he was transferred to a closely guarded state hospital in Prague, where he died on 25 February 1950, under a false name.

The court case of the "Číhošť Miracle" was heavily manipulated by the Communist authorities. It was reopened in 1968, during a period of political liberalization in Czechoslovakia, however, the investigation was stopped after the Warsaw Pact invasion of Czechoslovakia. Josef Toufar was fully rehabilitated only in 1998.

In 2013, the Czech Bishops' Conference announced the intention to start the process of beatification for him. Historian Tomáš Petráček was appointed as a postulator of his case.

== Background ==
Josef Toufar was born on 14 July 1902, in Arnolec. He studied to become a priest and came to Číhošť in 1948, at the time when an independent and supranational Catholic Church became a dangerous enemy for the newly established Czechoslovak Communist state. The repressions against the Church have gradually taken various shapes and resulted in arrests, tortures and murders. Fr. Toufar was one of many priests subjected to close monitoring and suspected of anti-state activities.

The police officer František Goldbricht was in the church on 21 December 1949, a few days before the StB agents presented the story about the built-in mechanical device. During the reconstruction of the case in 1968, he claimed that he didn't notice any such thing behind or under the altar. The StB claimed that the ropes and wires needed to set the cross into motion were hidden behind a bouquet of flowers on the altar, which was improbable as Church rules prohibit placing flowers on altars during Advent.

After the news about the miracle spread, the church became a popular place for a visit and many of the visitors asked Toufar for a small souvenir. The photographer Josef Peške, who made a photo of the cross on his request, later claimed that there wasn't any device under the cross. He copied the photo and Toufar distributed it to visitors. Peške was later sentenced to 13 years in prison, for "promotion of the Číhošť Miracle".

The warrant to arrest Fr Toufar was initially assigned to the local StB department in Jihlava, however, it was unsuccessful, as the priest was guarded by parishioners. He was arrested by the Prague department on 28 January 1950, and deported to the Valdice prison. The investigation of the "Číhošť Miracle" was closely watched by the highest communist authorities, Central Committee of the Communist Party and President Klement Gottwald. A member of the investigation team, Miloš Hrabina, remembered in 1962 that it was necessary to obtain incriminating materials, mainly the suspect's confession. A team of technicians was assigned to construct a mechanical device leading from the pulpit to the altar. They failed and then constructed a model which they presented at a press conference in March, 1950. Additionally, Fr. Toufar refused to recant, and was beaten repeatedly until he finally signed the confession contrived by Communists. During February 1950, his interrogator Ladislav Mácha "has beaten him so severely that on the 23rd of that month, he was unable to sit, move and spoke only very heavily." During his transfer to Číhošť shortly before his death, he had to be supported by the StB agents, as he was unable to walk on his smashed legs. His bleeding mouth had to be continuously wiped.

Josef Toufar died on 25 February, shortly after returning from Číhošť. His autopsy report was falsified in order to conceal mentions of injuries caused by torment in prison. He died under the false name J. Zouhar and was buried in a mass grave near to Ďáblice cemetery, allegedly along with a dead elephant from a zoo or a circus performing in Prague. His death was finally reported to his family four years later.

== Propaganda and fiction ==
The death of Josef Toufar and the "Číhošť miracle" have inspired several writers and filmmakers to create works of fiction and propaganda documents surrounding it:

- Běda tomu, skrze něhož přichází pohoršení (Alas for the One Through Whom the Umbrage Comes), a short propaganda film created by Přemysl Freiman in 1950
- Josef Škvorecký's novel Mirákl (The Miracle Game, 1972) is based on the story.
- Toufar, a chamber opera composed by Aleš Březina, directed by Petr Zelenka. Performed in the National Theatre in Prague
