= Číhošť =

- Municipality
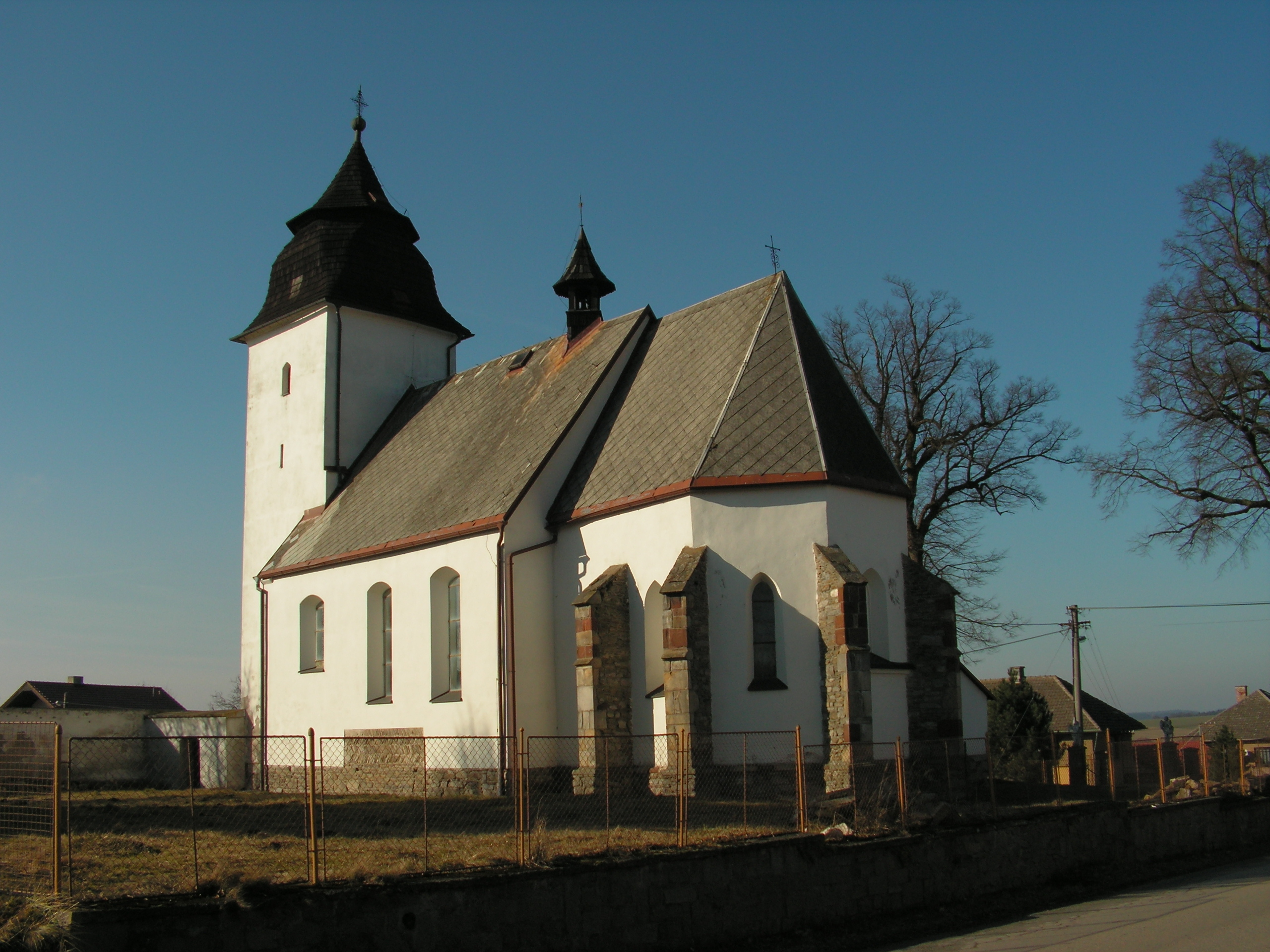
- Church of the Assumption of the Virgin Mary

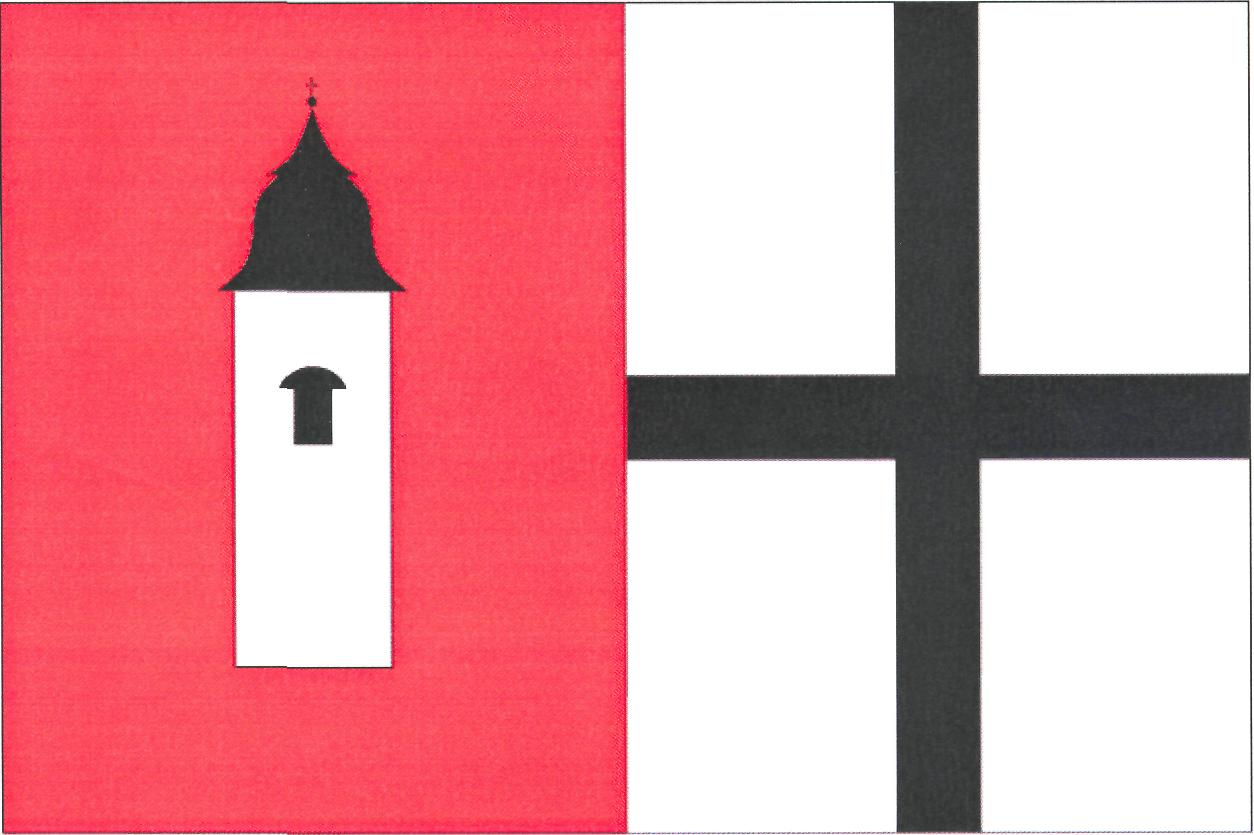
- Flag Coat of arms

- Location in the Czech Republic
- Coordinates: 49°44′31″N 15°20′6″E
- Country: Czech Republic
- Region: Vysočina
- District: Havlíčkův Brod
- First mentioned: 1347

Area
  - Total: 16.27 km^{2} (6.28 sq mi)
- Elevation: 545 m (1,788 ft)

Population (2026-01-01)
  - Total: 341
  - Density: 21.0/km^{2} (54.3/sq mi)
- Time zone: UTC+1 (CET)
  - Summer (DST): UTC+2 (CEST)
- Postal codes: 582 87, 584 01
- Website: www.cihost.cz

Číhošť (Czech pronunciation: [ˈtʃiːɦoʃc]) is a municipality and village in Havlíčkův Brod District in the Vysočina Region of the Czech Republic. It has about 300 inhabitants.

== Administrative division ==
Číhošť consists of five municipal parts (in brackets population according to the 2021 census):

- Číhošť (149)
- Hlohov (49)
- Hroznětín (35)
- Tunochody (69)
- Zdeslavice (32)

== Etymology ==
The name is derived from the personal name Číhošt (written as Čiehošt in old Czech), meaning "Číhošt's (court)".

== Geography ==
Číhošť is located about 22 kilometres (14 mi) northwest of Havlíčkův Brod and 41 km (25 mi) northwest of Jihlava. It lies in the Upper Sázava Hills. The highest point is the hill Borovina at 587 m (1,926 ft) above sea level.

In the municipality is located the officially calculated geographical centre of the Czech Republic. It is marked by a monument.

== History ==
The first written mention of Číhošť is from 1347. From 1348 to 1806, silver was mined in the hills above the village.

The village was the site of the so-called Číhošť miracle in 1949, which led to a crackdown by communist authorities against the Catholic Church and murder of local priest Josef Toufar.

== Demographics ==
Historical population

Year	Pop.	±%
1869	1,067	—
1880	1,044	−2.2%
1890	1,013	−3.0%
1900	915	−9.7%
1910	885	−3.3%

Year	Pop.	±%
1921	880	−0.6%
1930	844	−4.1%
1950	620	−26.5%
1961	574	−7.4%
1970	481	−16.2%

Year	Pop.	±%
1980	418	−13.1%
1991	347	−17.0%
2001	335	−3.5%
2011	311	−7.2%
2021	334	+7.4%

Source: Censuses

== Transport ==
There are no railways or major roads passing through the municipality.

== Sights ==
The main landmark of Číhošť is the Church of the Assumption of the Virgin Mary. It is a Gothic building from the first half of the 14th century, built on the site of an older church.
