= 1902 Atlantic hurricane season =

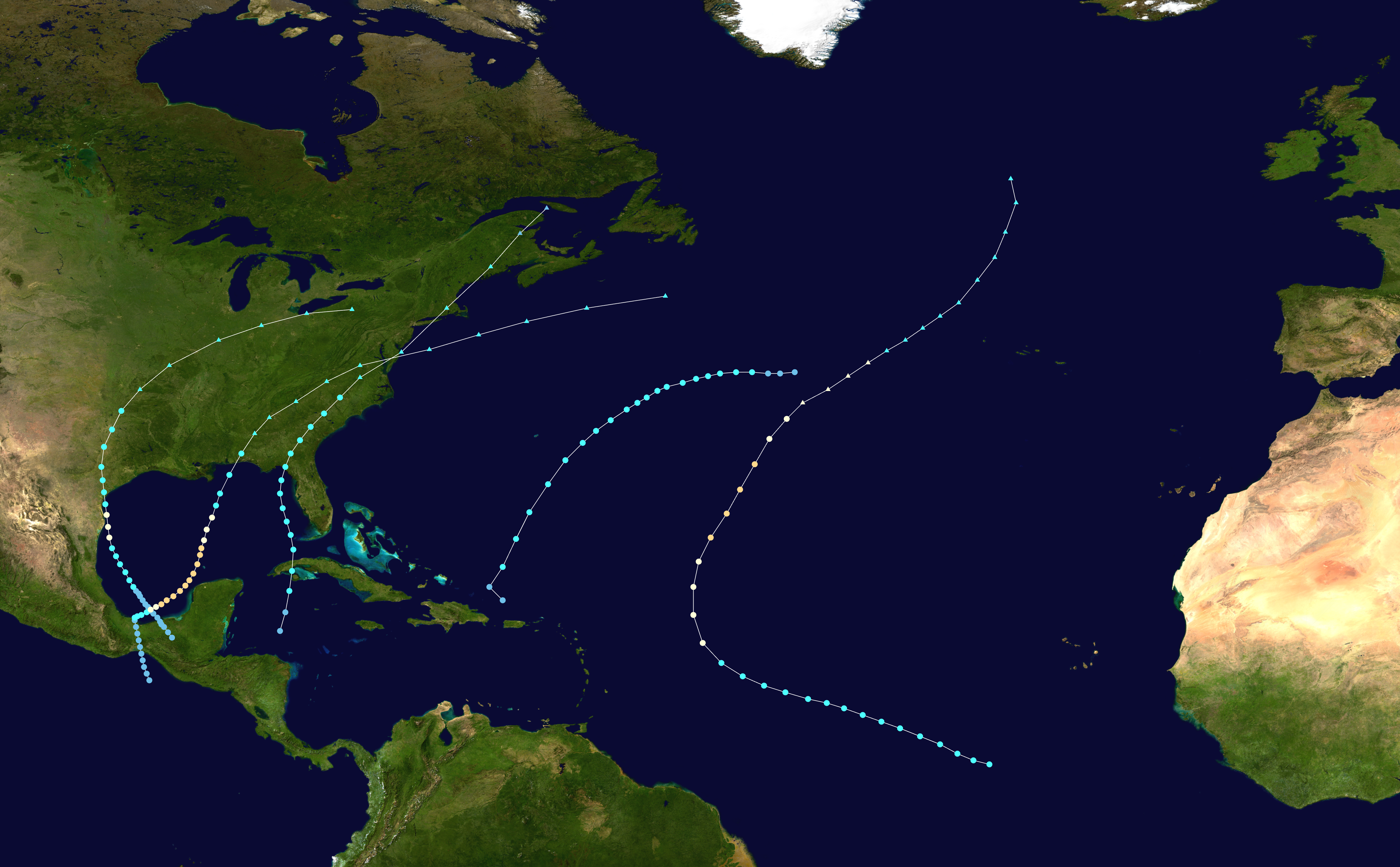
- Season summary map

Seasonal boundaries
- First system formed: June 12, 1902
- Last system dissipated: November 6, 1902

Strongest storm
- Name: Four
  - Maximum winds: 105 mph (165 km/h) (1-minute sustained)
  - Lowest pressure: 970 mbar (hPa; 28.64 inHg)

Seasonal statistics
- Total storms: 5
- Hurricanes: 3
- Total fatalities: 5
- Total damage: Unknown

Related articles
- 1900–09 Pacific hurricane seasons; 1902-19 Pacific typhoon seasons; 1900s North Indian Ocean cyclone seasons

The 1902 Atlantic hurricane season featured five known tropical cyclones, three of which made landfall in the United States. The first system was initially observed in the northwestern Caribbean on June 12. The last system dissipated on November 6 while located well southeast of Newfoundland. These dates fall within the period with the most tropical cyclone activity in the Atlantic. None of the systems existed simultaneously.

Of the season's five tropical cyclones, three reached hurricane status. However, none of them strengthened into major hurricanes, which are Category 3 or higher on the modern-day Saffir–Simpson hurricane wind scale. Along with 1901, this was the first time that two consecutive seasons lacked a major hurricane since 1864 and 1865. Only one storm left significant impact, which was the second hurricane. It brought flooding and strong winds to Texas, resulting in severe damage in some areas. A tornado spawned by the storm also caused five fatalities.

The season's activity was reflected with an accumulated cyclone energy (ACE) rating of 28, the lowest value since 1890. ACE is a metric used to express the energy used by a tropical cyclone during its lifetime. Therefore, a storm with a longer duration will have high values of ACE. It is only calculated at six-hour increments in which specific tropical and subtropical systems are either at or above sustained wind speeds of 39 mph (63 km/h), which is the threshold for tropical storm intensity. Thus, tropical depressions are not included here.

== Systems ==
=== Tropical Storm One ===
- Tropical storm (SSHWS)
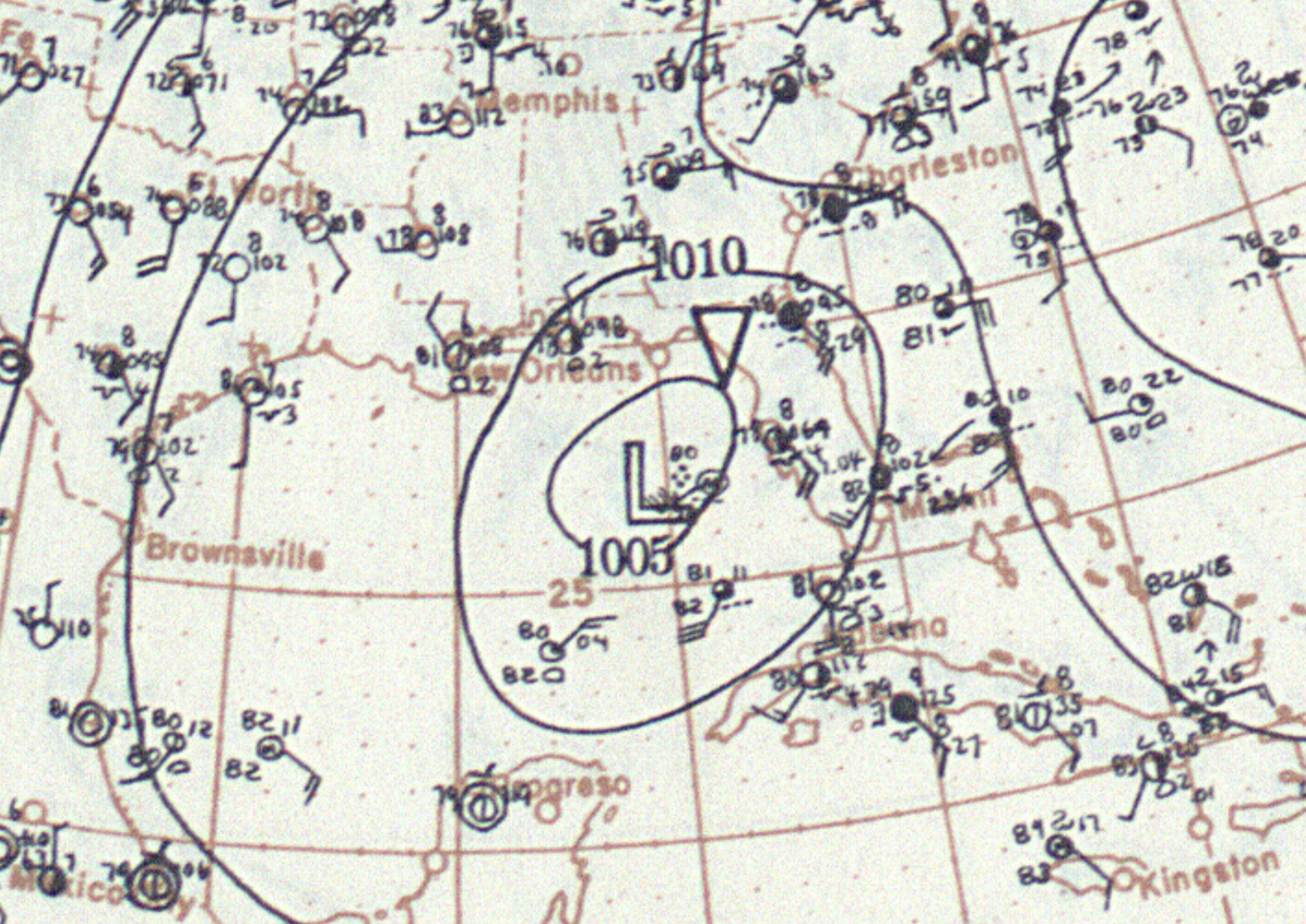
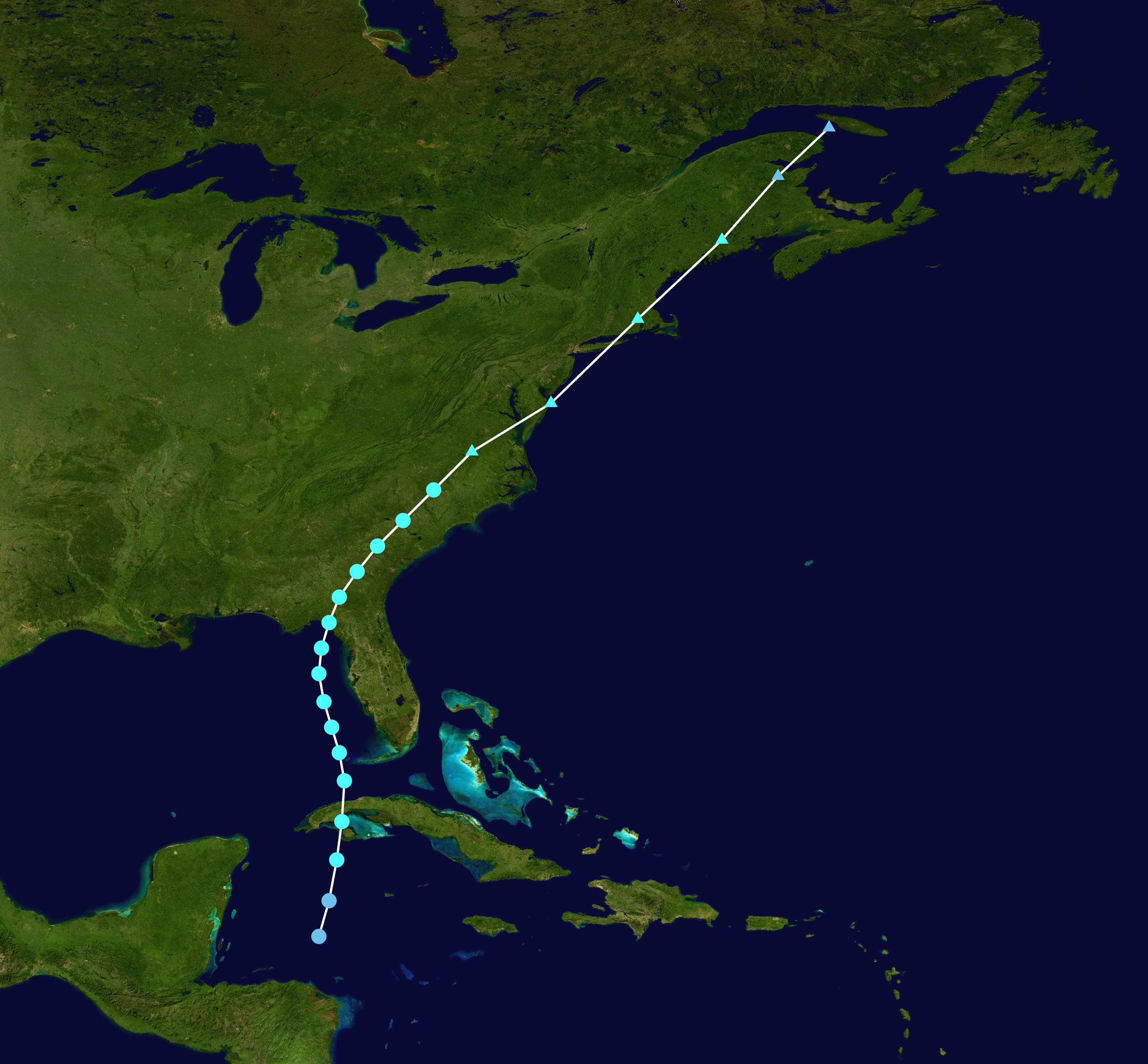
- Duration: June 12 – June 16
- Peak intensity: 60 mph (95 km/h) (1-min); <997 mbar (hPa)

In June, a low-pressure area was observed over the western Caribbean. At 12:00 UTC on June 12, a tropical depression developed about 20 mi (30 km) north of Swan Island, Honduras. The depression moved north-northeastward and intensified into a tropical storm early the next day. Later on June 13, the storm made landfall in modern-day Artemisa Province of Cuba with winds of 45 mph (70 km/h). After reaching the Gulf of Mexico late on June 13, the system continued to strengthen and peaked with maximum sustained winds of 60 mph (95 km/h). Around 23:00 UTC, it made landfall near Steinhatchee, Florida, at the same intensity.

After moving inland, the storm moved northeastward and slowly weakened. Around midday on June 16, the system became extratropical over southeastern Virginia and then accelerated northeastward, before dissipating near Anticosti Island, Quebec, late on the following day. Some locations in Florida observed tropical storm force winds. In Virginia, the steamer Falcon sank 2 mi (3.2 km) southeast of False Cape. On June 16, the cities of Fredericksburg and New Canton both set 24-hour rainfall records for the month of June, with 3.45 in (88 mm) and 3.7 in (94 mm) observed, respectively. A drought in the area was ended, which particularly benefited tobacco crops.

=== Hurricane Two ===
- Category 1 hurricane (SSHWS)
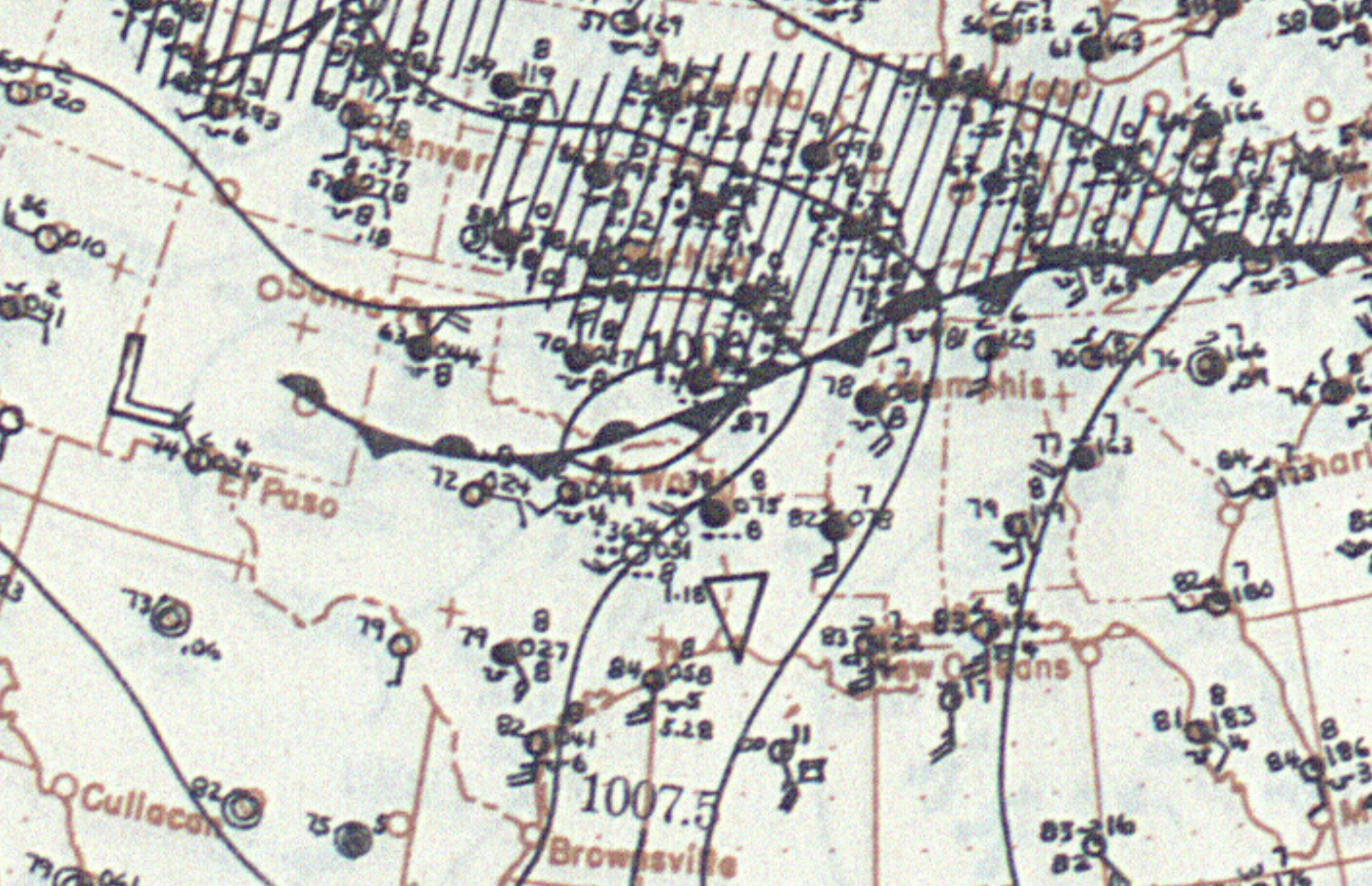
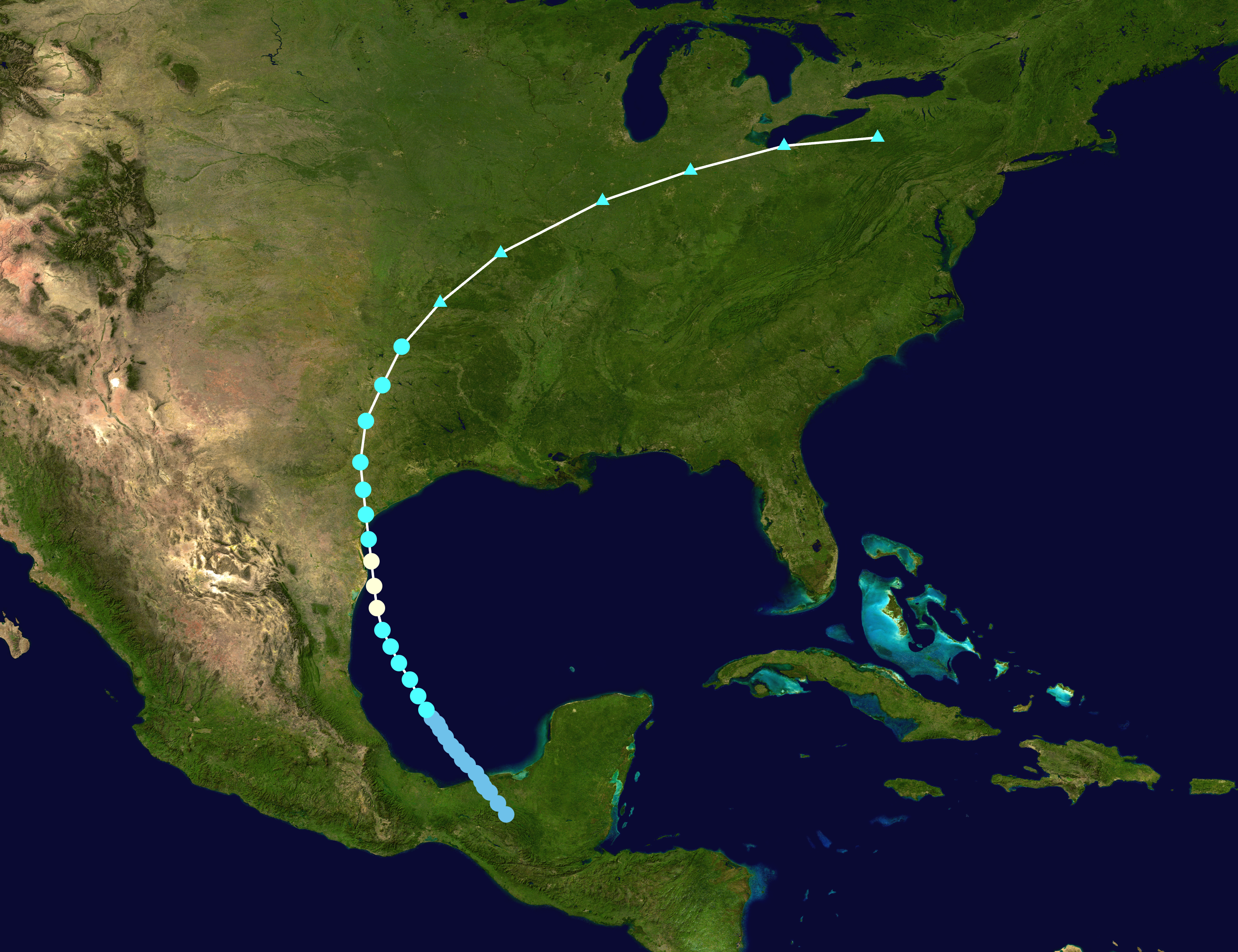
- Duration: June 21 – June 28
- Peak intensity: 80 mph (130 km/h) (1-min); <995 mbar (hPa)

The second observed tropical cyclone of the season developed over Chiapas at 00:00 UTC on June 21. Initially a tropical depression, the system moved slowly northwestward and reached the Gulf of Mexico early the next day. Around 12:00 UTC on June 23, it strengthened into a tropical storm. While curving north-northwestward, the storm intensified into a hurricane at 00:00 UTC on June 26. Six hours later, the hurricane attained its maximum sustained wind speed of 80 mph (130 km/h). However, it then began to weaken falling to tropical storm status late on June 26. At 21:00 UTC that day, the storm made landfall near Corpus Christi, Texas, with winds of 70 mph (115 km/h). After moving inland, the system quickly weakened and became extratropical over Oklahoma by midday on June 28. The remnants moved rapidly northeastward before dissipating over Pennsylvania the next day.

A drought existed in Texas for the previous six weeks. Thus, rainfall produce by this storm was beneficial to cotton and rice. However, withered corn stalks were easily blown down by the wind. Further, heavy precipitation in some areas resulted in flooding. The highest 24-hour rainfall total was 14.22 in (361 mm) at Nacogdoches, setting a daily rainfall record for June. This swelled Lanana and Bonita creeks. All bridges were swept away and communication was cut off, while the south side of town was underwater. At Galveston, 5.54 in (141 mm) of rain fell on June 27, setting a daily rainfall record. Over 6 in (150 mm) fell in La Porte, ruining more than 200,000 lb (91,000 kg) of hay west of town. Morgan's Point was 3 ft (0.91 m) under water. In Gregg and Harrison counties, heavy rains washed out the Texas and Pacific railroads. Flooding occurred across the upper Sabine basin as well.

Strong winds also buffeted portions of the state, with gusts up to 65 mph (105 km/h) in Galveston. A freight train was blown off the track at East Bernard in Wharton County. A tornado moved northeast through Krasna, near Wallis, killing five people. In El Campo, fruit fell off trees. Windmills and chimneys were blown down in Edna, while in Ganado and Louise, outhouses and barns were destroyed. In Houston, trees were uprooted and outhouses destroyed by the gale. Electric wires were downed. Trees were uprooted and damage to sorghum crops were reported in Lavaca County. The remnants of the storm produced heavy rainfall in Missouri and tornadoes in Indiana. The storm in Great Plains set up a cold and moist easterly wind which caused colder than normal temperatures in Nebraska and a rare late June snowstorm in Denver, Colorado; up to 8 in (200 mm) was observed.

=== Hurricane Three ===
- Category 2 hurricane (SSHWS)
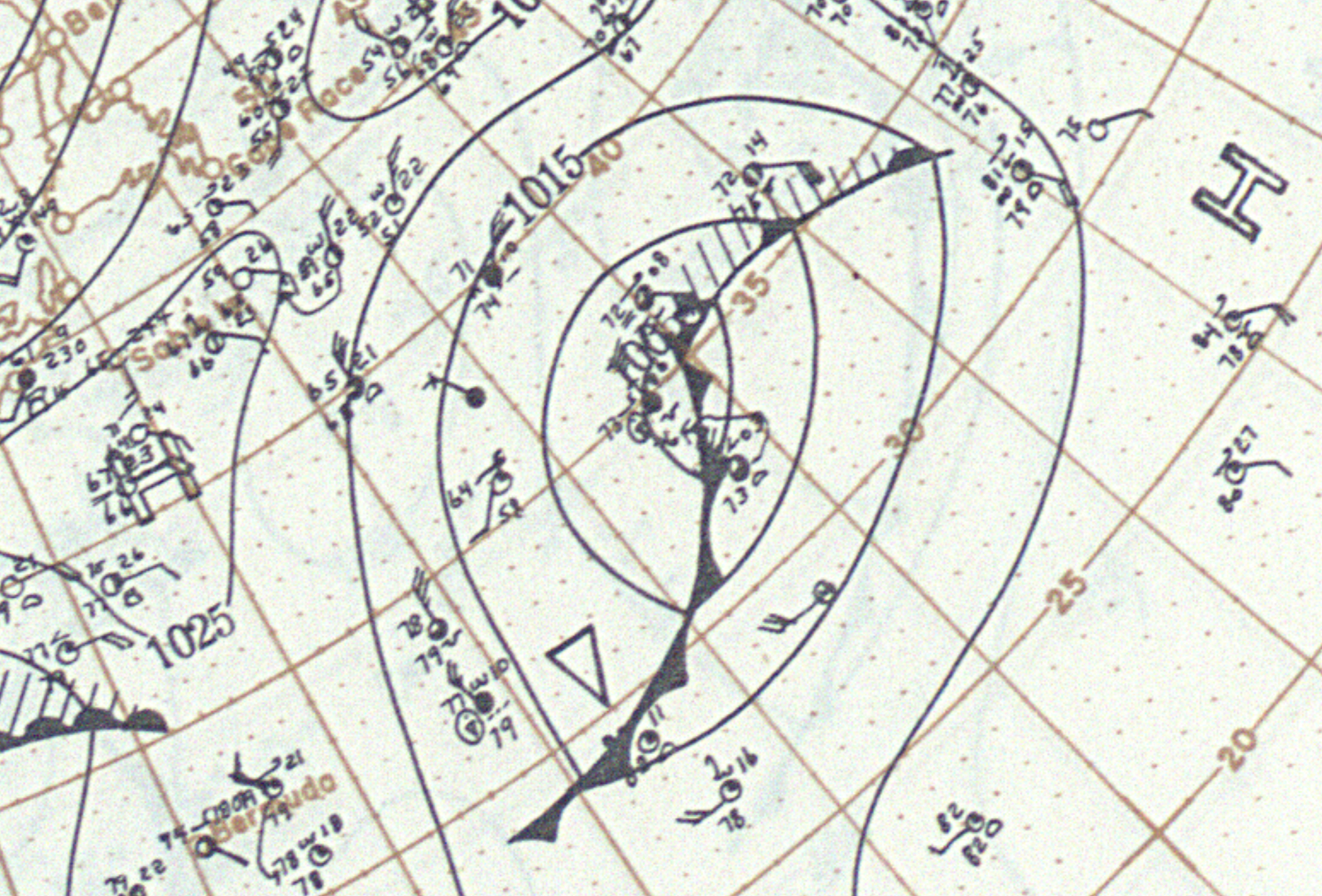
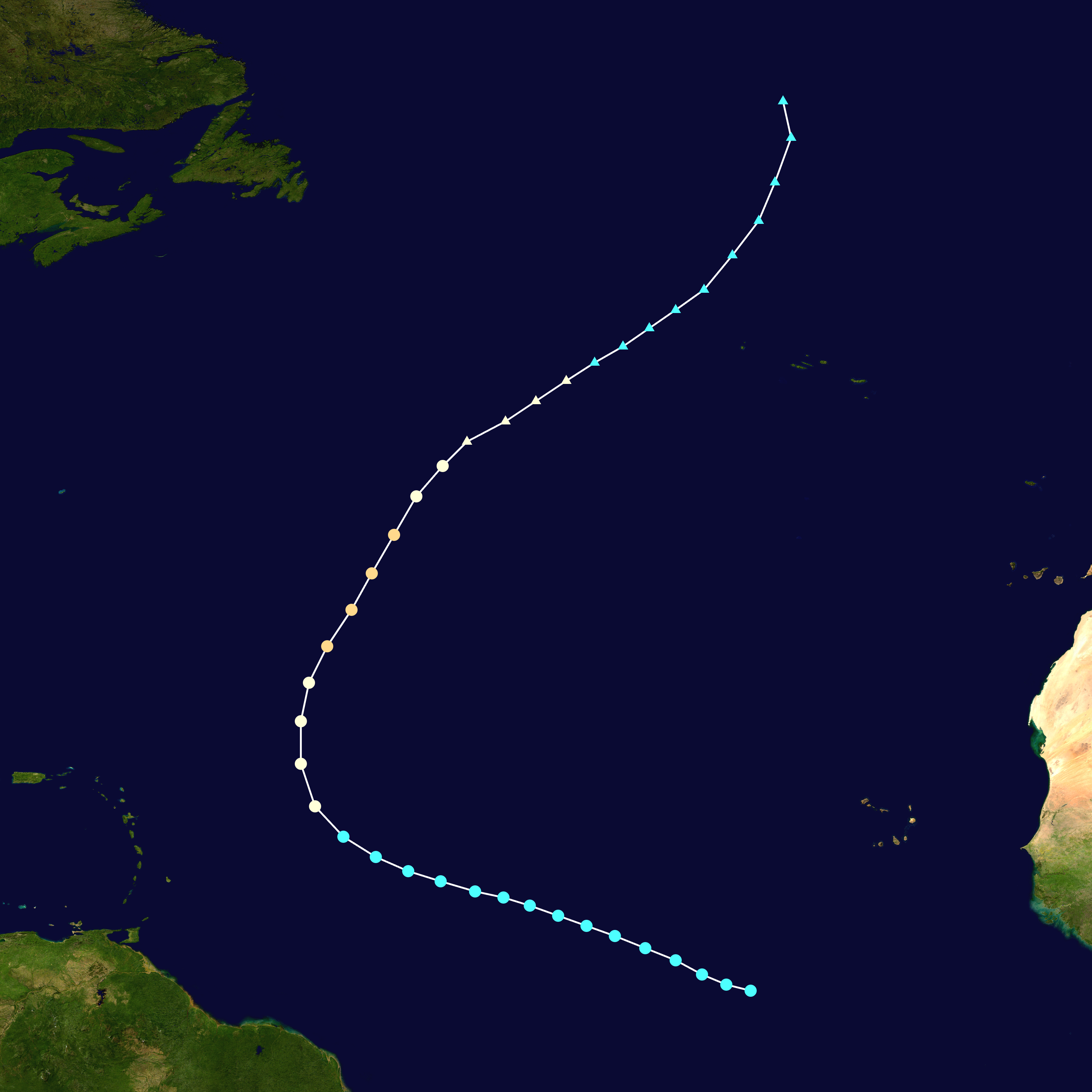
- Duration: September 16 – September 22
- Peak intensity: 100 mph (155 km/h) (1-min); 981 mbar (hPa)

A tropical storm was first observed at 06:00 UTC on September 16, while located about 640 mi (1,030 km) southwest of Cape Verde, at the most southerly latitude of any North Atlantic tropical-storm-strength cyclone on record. The storm headed west-northwestward for a few days and slowly strengthened. Late on September 19, it accelerated and began curving northwestward. At 00:00 UTC the next day, the storm strengthened into a Category 1 hurricane on the modern-day Saffir–Simpson hurricane wind scale. Later on September 20, the hurricane curved northward and then to the northeast. Further deepening occurred, with the storm becoming a Category 2 hurricane early the following day.

On September 21, the system peaked with sustained winds of 100 mph (155 km/h). A ship that encountered the storm and observed a barometric pressure of 981 mbar (29.0 inHg). The storm began weakening on September 22 and fell to Category 1 intensity. Several hours later, it became extratropical while located about 810 mi (1,305 km) west-southwest of Flores Island in the Azores. The remnants of this storm continued northeastward and weakened, until dissipating about 800 mi (1,285 km) southeast of Cape Farewell, Greenland, on September 25.

=== Hurricane Four ===
- Category 2 hurricane (SSHWS)
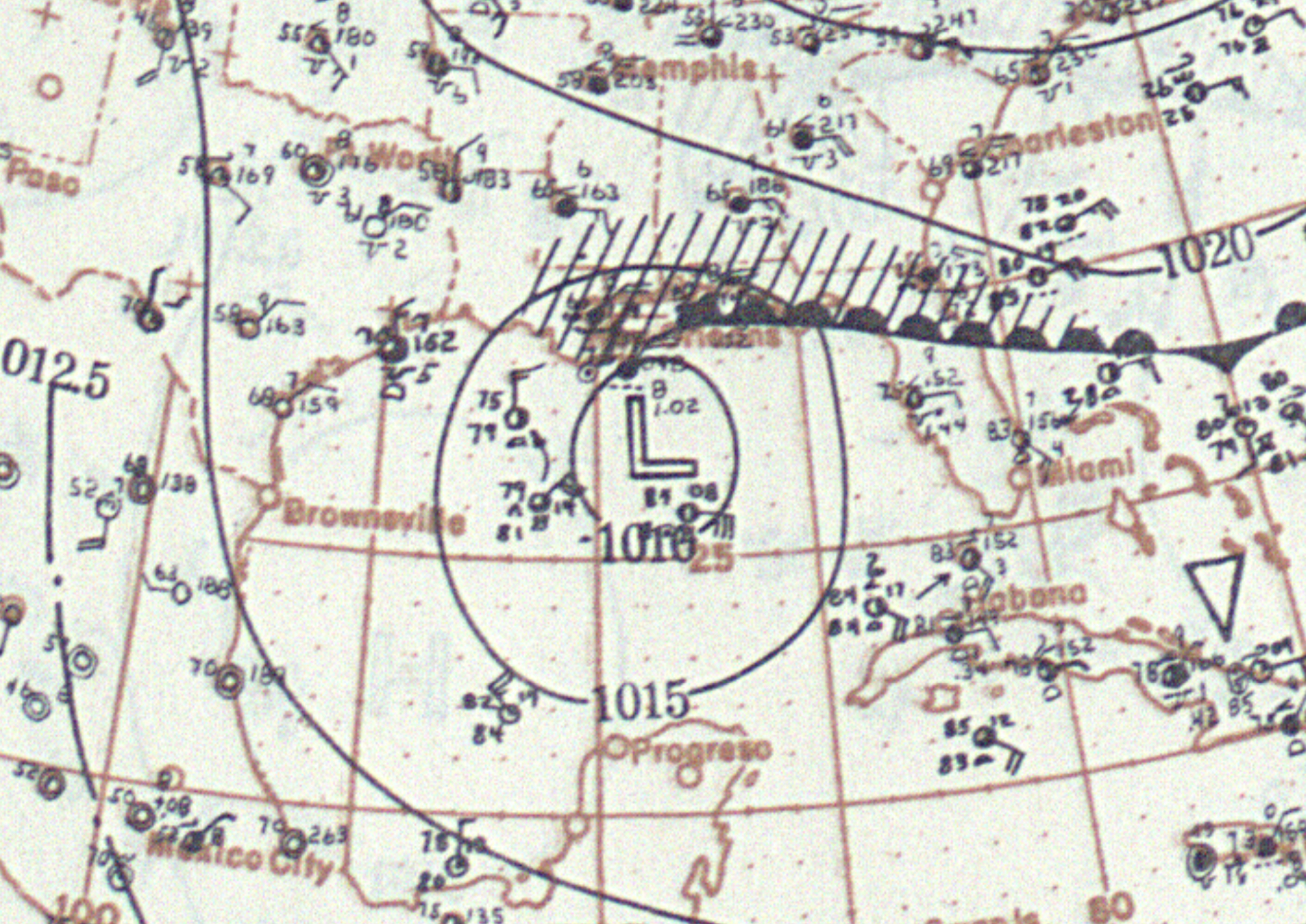
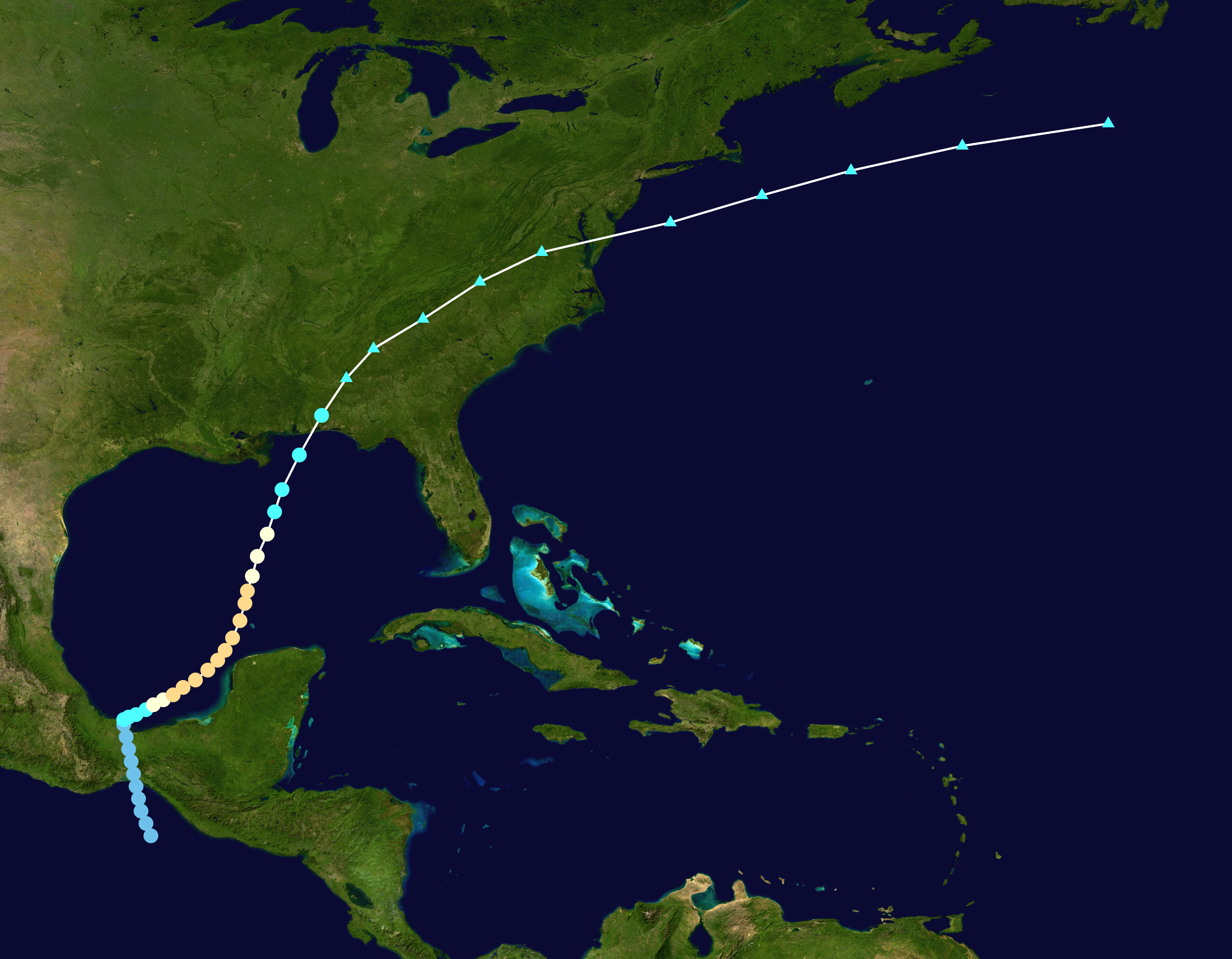
- Duration: October 3 – October 11
- Peak intensity: 105 mph (165 km/h) (1-min); 970 mbar (hPa)

A tropical depression developed in the Pacific Ocean while located about 105 mi (165 km) west-southwest of Tapachula, Chiapas, on October 3. The depression moved slowly north-northwestward and made landfall in a rural area of southeastern Oaxaca early the next day. On October 5, the system reached the Gulf of Mexico and soon intensified into a tropical storm. Thereafter, it curved east-northeastward and strengthened into a Category 1 hurricane by October 6. Early the next day, the storm became a Category 2 hurricane and peaked with maximum sustained winds of 105 mph (165 km/h) and a minimum barometric pressure of 970 mbar (29 inHg).

However, on October 9, the hurricane weakened to a Category 1. Around 06:00 UTC the following day, the system weakened further to a tropical storm. Later on October 10 at 21:00 UTC, it made another landfall near Pensacola, Florida, with winds of 60 mph (95 km/h). The storm rapidly weakened inland and became extratropical early on October 11. The remnants accelerated while moving across the Southeastern United States and eventually emerged into the Atlantic Ocean, before dissipating south of Atlantic Canada on October 13. Some damage was reported in Tabasco due to gales. Along the eastern Gulf Coast of the United States, strong winds were observed.

=== Tropical Storm Five ===
- Tropical storm (SSHWS)
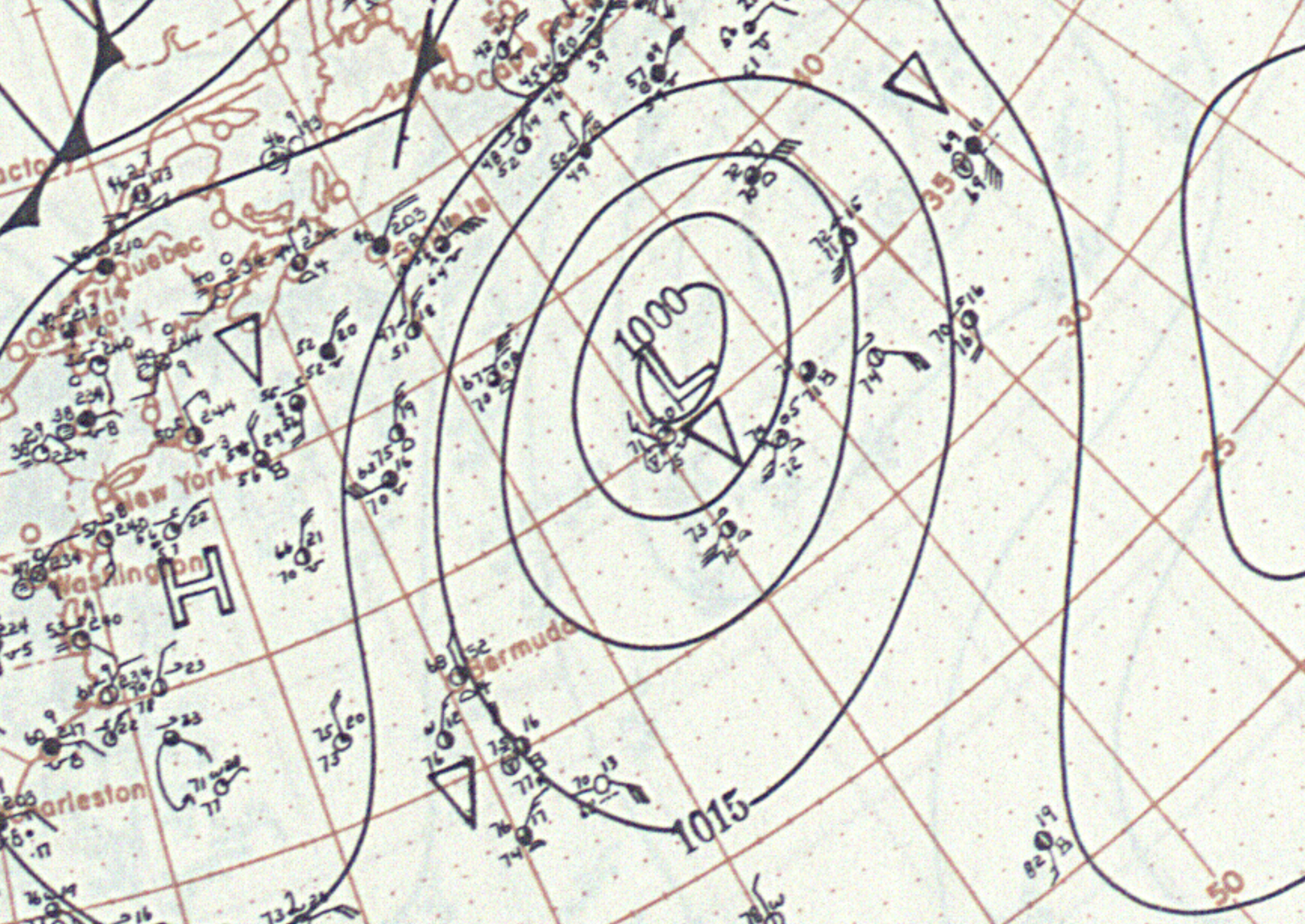
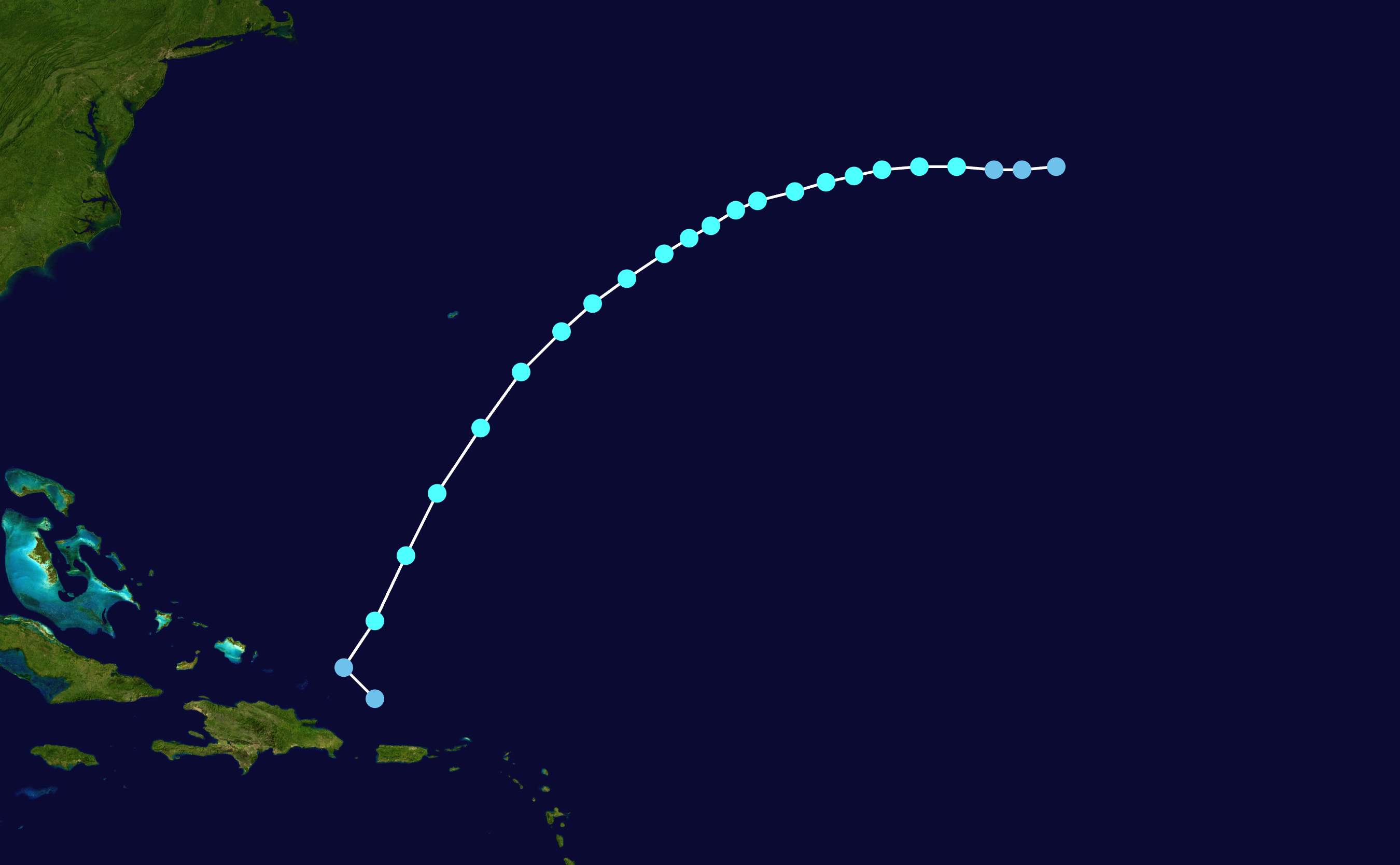
- Duration: November 1 – November 6
- Peak intensity: 70 mph (110 km/h) (1-min); <993 mbar (hPa)

The final storm developed north of Puerto Rico at 00:00 UTC on November 1 as a tropical depression. Initially, it headed northwestward, but re-curved to the northeast about six hours later. By midday on November 1, the depression strengthened into a tropical storm. The storm continued to intensify and peaked with sustained winds of 70 mph (110 km/h) early on November 3. Around that time, a ship observed a barometric pressure of 993 mbar (29.3 inHg), possibly suggesting hurricane intensity. Later on November 5, the storm began heading in a more eastward direction and weakened. At 06:00 UTC the next day, it weakened to a tropical depression and dissipated several hours later, while located about 760 mi (1,225 km) southeast of Cape Race, Newfoundland.

== Season effects ==
This is a table of all of the storms that have formed in the 1902 Atlantic hurricane season. It includes their duration, names, landfall(s)–denoted by bold location names – damages, and death totals. Deaths in parentheses are additional and indirect (an example of an indirect death would be a traffic accident), but were still related to that storm. Damage and deaths include totals while the storm was extratropical, a wave, or a low, and all of the damage figures are in 1902 USD.

Saffir–Simpson scale
TD	TS	C1	C2	C3	C4	C5

1902 North Atlantic tropical cyclone season statistics
Storm name	Dates active	Storm category at peak intensity	Max 1-min wind mph (km/h)	Min. press. (mbar)	Areas affected	Damage (US$)	Deaths	Ref(s).
One	June 12–16	Tropical storm	60 (95)	997	Cuba, East Coast of the United States (Florida), Atlantic Canada	Minor	None	
Two	June 21–28	Category 1 hurricane	80 (130)	995	Mexico, Great Plains (Texas), Midwestern United States	Unknown	5	
Three	September 16–22	Category 2 hurricane	100 (155)	981	None	None	None	
Four	October 3–11	Category 2 hurricane	105 (165)	970	Mexico, Gulf Coast of the United States (Florida), East Coast of the United States	Minor	None	
Five	November 1–6	Tropical storm	70 (110)	993	None	None	None	
Season aggregates
5 systems	June 12 – November 6		105 (165)	970		Unknown	5	

== See also ==
- Atlantic hurricane season
- 1900–1940 South Pacific cyclone seasons
- 1900–1950 South-West Indian Ocean cyclone seasons
- 1900s Australian region cyclone seasons
