= Model 1902 Army Officers' Sword =

Current U.S. Army sword

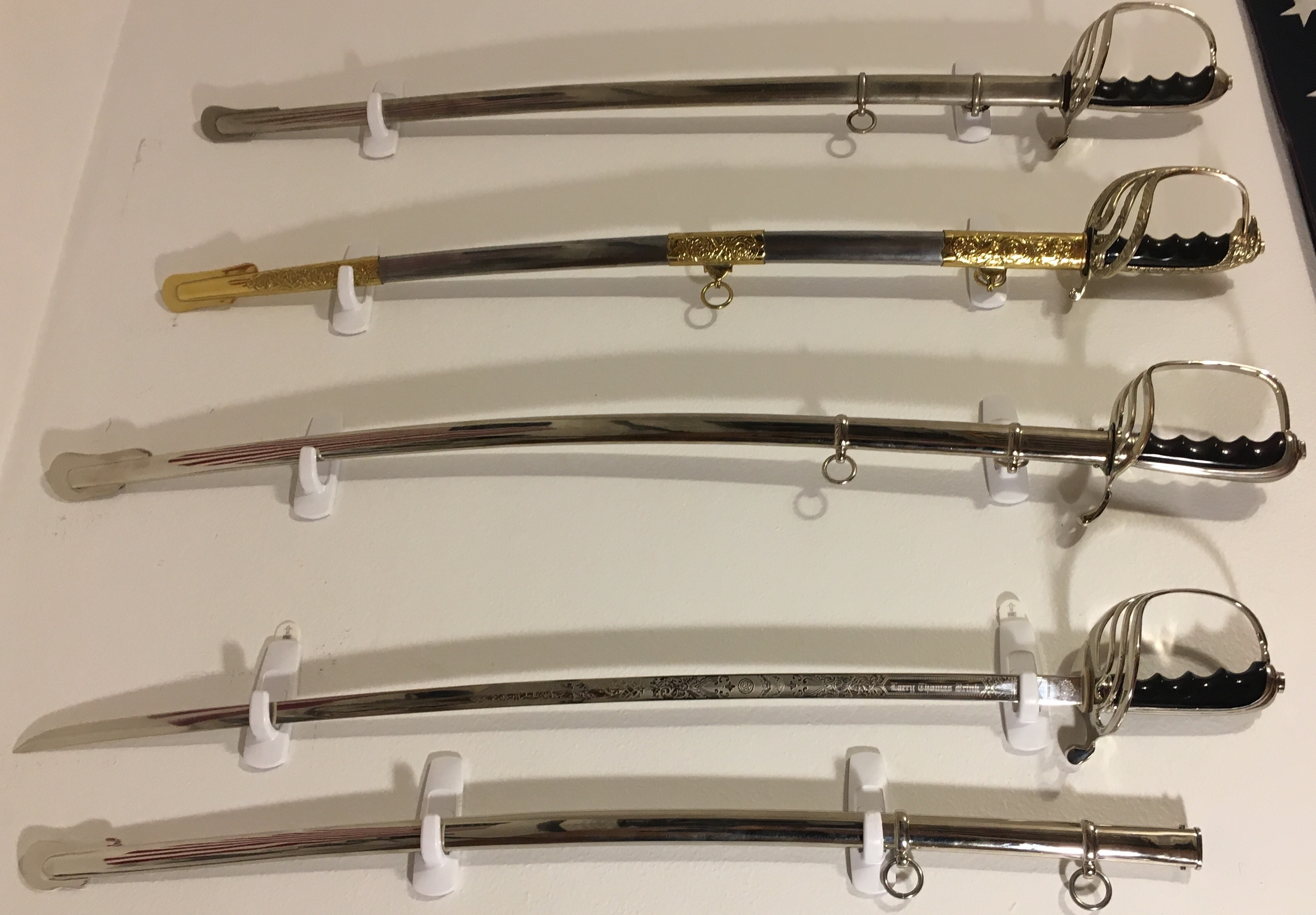
M1902 U.S. Army Officer's Sabers of various makes

The Model 1902 Army Officers' Saber is the current sword used by officers of the United States Army and United States Air Force. The official nomenclature for the current regulation U.S. Army saber is “saber for all officers, Model 1902”. It was adopted on July 17, 1902, by authority of General Order No. 81. The M1902 saber was authorized for all officers, both infantry and cavalry, with the exception of Chaplains. The lightly curved blade measures between 30 and 34 inches long with weights initially specified by the U.S. Army to be between 20.2 and 22.8 ounces (573 to 647 grams) and a point of balance of 3.25 inches from the hilt as specified for infantry sabers.

== History ==
By the early 1870s combat experience had convinced many American military officers that swords had, at best, a tertiary role in the modern army. Given its lack of usage during the American Civil War and Indian Wars, many objected to the weight of carrying the Model 1850 Army Staff & Field Officers' Sword. This led to the adoption of the Model 1860 Army Staff & Field Officers' Sword, previously only worn by officers unlikely to see direct combat, as the regulation sword for all categories of unmounted infantry officer in 1872. (Note: This has led to the sword also being referred to as the Model 1872 Army Staff & Field Officers' Sword, although its design is identical to the Model 1860) The M1860 was significantly lighter design to be used by officers primarily as a sign of rank. However many disliked the idea of carrying a purely ceremonial weapon in combat, and the M1860's delicate design proved ill-suited to the rigors of military use in the field. Some officers took to carrying the Model 1872 Cavalry Officers' Saber, or not carrying any sword at all. However the M1872, while much preferred over the delicate M1860, lacked the strength to hold up under heavy use. Criticism of both the M1860 and M1872 eventually lead to the adoption of the M1902 in July of that year for both cavalry and infantry officers. A sturdy and effective weapon, the M1902 took heavily from the previous cavalry officers' saber, and was considered a large improvement over its predecessors.

The final design of the M1902 was the result of many years of study and experimentation by Henry V. Allien & Company, in collaboration with several army officers after they approached Mr. Allien privately and requested he develop a more effective saber for the US military. After many years of research by Mr. Allien, including numerous trips to Europe and making a number of patterns with both straight and curved blades, a final design was completed and laid before General John C. Kelton, who was noted as being a skilled swordsman. He recommended making it less curved from center to point, the latter to be in line with the gripe, so as to give greater force in thrusting. Years later in June 1902, a board met in Washington DC to develop new regulations for Army uniforms, part of which induced the adoption of a new regulation saber. Henry V. Allien & Company submitted five pattern swords for the uniform board's consideration, three with straight blades and two with curved, and the Ordnance Department submitted a similar number. The result was that of the ten patterns, one of the Allien swords was adopted, the very one approved by General Kelton.

Although regarded as a significant improvement over the M1860, praise was not universal for the M1902. Although the uniform board contained several highly experienced and decorated officers, (Note: Most notably General Robert Patterson Hughes, who as a young officer was repeatedly cited for bravery during the Civil War, and Colonel Marion Perry Maus, who was awarded the Medal of Honor for his actions during the Geronimo Campaign) none were noted as experts in swordplay. The board's membership was selected to present a diverse set of military knowledge, as it also had to consider many other items of clothing and equipment, and was rather different than it might have if the adoption of a new regulation sword was its primary concern. The resulting M1902 pattern sword was considered a compromise between lightness and efficiency, with several members of the Ordnance Board questioning if such a light blade could still be effective in combat during a 1905 review of the sword. Nonetheless, the review eventually recommended maintaining the current pattern saber and the M1902 remains the regulation sword for officers of the US army.

The M1902's modern role is completely ceremonial, and it is virtually never carried except in parades and ceremonies, by commissioned officers in command of troops in formation. It is also used by United States Air Force officers for their parades and ceremonies. As a presentation saber, the M1902 is also sometimes given to newly commissioned officers of distinction or as retirement or change of command gifts.
