= Tomáš Petráček =

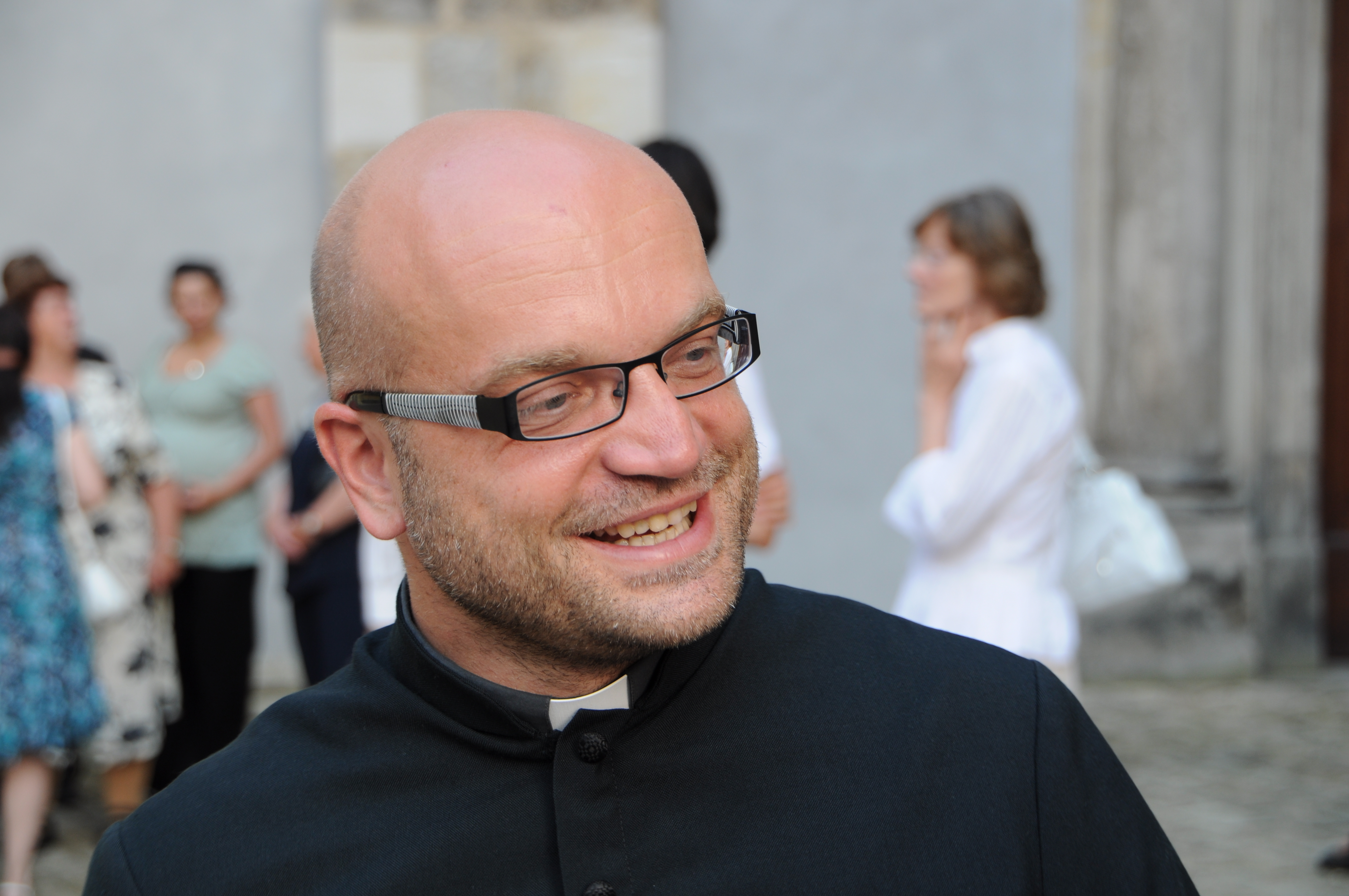
Tomáš Petráček

Tomáš Petráček (born 1972 in Hořice v Podkrkonoší) is a Czech public intellectual, Roman Catholic priest, and scholar. His work covers the intersection of church and social historians. He works at the Department of Cultural and Religious Studies at the Faculty of Education at the University of Hradec Králové in East Bohemia, and at the Institute for the History of Christian Art at the Catholic Theological Faculty of Charles University in Prague. He is the author of seven monographs and more than 80 articles, studies and papers not only in Czech but also in English, French, German and Polish. He is an active member of the editorial board for the Czech journal Salve, which deals with theological, historical, philosophical, and cultural themes. As a Roman Catholic priest, he serves as chaplain of the academic community in Hradec Králové. He was appointed Canon of the Chapter of All Saints Church at Prague Castle, founded in 1339 by Emperor and King Charles IV for professors of Charles University, in 2010.

== Work ==
The first topic that Petráček chose to investigate in his scholarly work was the social and economic history of the early Middle Ages in the Czech lands, focusing on the lower strata of society in particular. This work resulted in the 2003 publication of the monograph The Phenomenon of Donated People in the Czech Lands in the 11th–12th Centuries: On the Knowledge of Economic and Social History of the Czech Lands at the Time of Dukes. A second, revised and expanded version of the book was published in 2012 by the publishing house Argo under the title Serfs and Freemen, Dukes and Manorial Estates: the Phenomenon of Donated People in Premyslid Bohemia in the 10th–12th Centuries. Petráček has also published numerous other studies and articles concerning social, economic and religious history. In 2017, he published his book Power and Exploitation in the Czech Lands in the 10th–12th Centuries.

While studying theology, Petráček began to concern himself with issues in the history of Catholic exegesis during the modernist crisis in the Catholic Church. One of the key figures in the University of Fribourg was the Old Testament Exegesis Professor Vincent Zapletal (1867–1938) of the Dominican Order, who worked at the Theological Faculty of the University from 1893 to 1928. Zapletal was among the most significant figures in progressive Catholic exegesis, along with the French biblical scholar Marie Joseph Lagrange OP and German Jesuit Franz von Hummelauer. Zapletal sought a scientific interpretation of the Bible and employed a historical-critical method, and became a victim of the anti-modernist crisis in the Catholic Church between 1904 and 1914. Petráček completed a critical biography entitled Bible Science in the Period of the (Anti-)Modernist Crisis: The Life and Work of Vincent Zapletal OP (1897–1938). It was published in 2006 in the Czech Republic. There was also an abridged French version, Le Pere Vincent Zapletal O.P. (1867–1938). Petráček has also published numerous studies and articles appearing in the academic journals such as Revue Biblique or Mémoire Dominicaine and most of them in the Czech journal Salve. The culmination of his research work is The Bible and Modern Criticism: Progressive Czech and World Exegesis in the Vortex of the (Anti-)Modernist Crisis, which was published by the Vyšehrad publishing house in 2011.

Other scholarly interests of Petráček include historical anthropology and issues related to cross-cultural communication, adaptation, and the diversity and dynamics of society and culture in European history, particularly in the area of church, social and religious history. Petráček has examined the question of the causes and roots of the dynamic secularization of the Czech lands and in 2013 published Secularization and Catholicism in the Czech lands: Specific Aspects of the Czech Route from National Church to the Most Atheist Country in the World.

In the Polish publishing house El Press, he published three monographs in English. In his first English book In the Maelstrom of Secularization, Collaboration and Persecution: Roman Catholicism in Modern Czech Society and the State, the author explores the various processes which culminated in Roman Catholicism drastically falling in both position and status in the modern Czech culture, society, and state, thus rendering a privileged and self-confident national church a problematic, humiliated, barely tolerated and, for much of the 20th century, brutally persecuted community.

In the second English book, Church, Society and Change: Christianity impaired by conflicting elites, he presents four model situations to prove that the way in which the Christian elites of the different confessions coped with the primary problem of a divided Christendom is interpreted as a moment of rupture in the history of the Western church, which undermined its adaptive and innovative capacities and so set European society on the path to modern secularisation.

In his third book, Man, Values and the Dynamics of Medieval Society: Anthropological Concepts of the Middle Ages in a Transcultural Perspective, the author analyses how Medieval culture and civilization in Europe was able to come to terms with cultural, social and religious plurality and diversity without posing a threat to solidarity, openness, dynamism and the actual functioning of society using selected phenomena such as the Inquisition, Canon Law, cult of relics, etc.

In 2016 Petraček continued his research in the field of modern social and church history with the book The Council, Tradition, Reform: The Legacy of the Second Vatican Council.

In 2017 he published a small book with the title The West and its Faith: 9.5 Theses on the Impact of Luther‘s Reformation. The 500th anniversary of the beginning of the Reformation gave him, in particular within the context of the contemporary development of the position and role of the church in western society, an opportunity for more general thoughts concerning the influence of the events of the sixteenth century on the history of Christianity, the church and society.

Recently he published some studies in modern Czech social and church history, such as The First and Second Life of Father Josef Toufar (1902–1950) and Shifts in Interpretations of Modern Czech History.

== Teaching ==
In 2007, he was appointed head of the Department of Cultural and Religious Studies at the Faculty of Education at the University of Hradec Králové. Under Petráček's guidance, the department has become one of the university's most prolific departments for publications, and offers a study program in transcultural communication studies, which also includes an English language study option.
