= Arnolec =

- Municipality
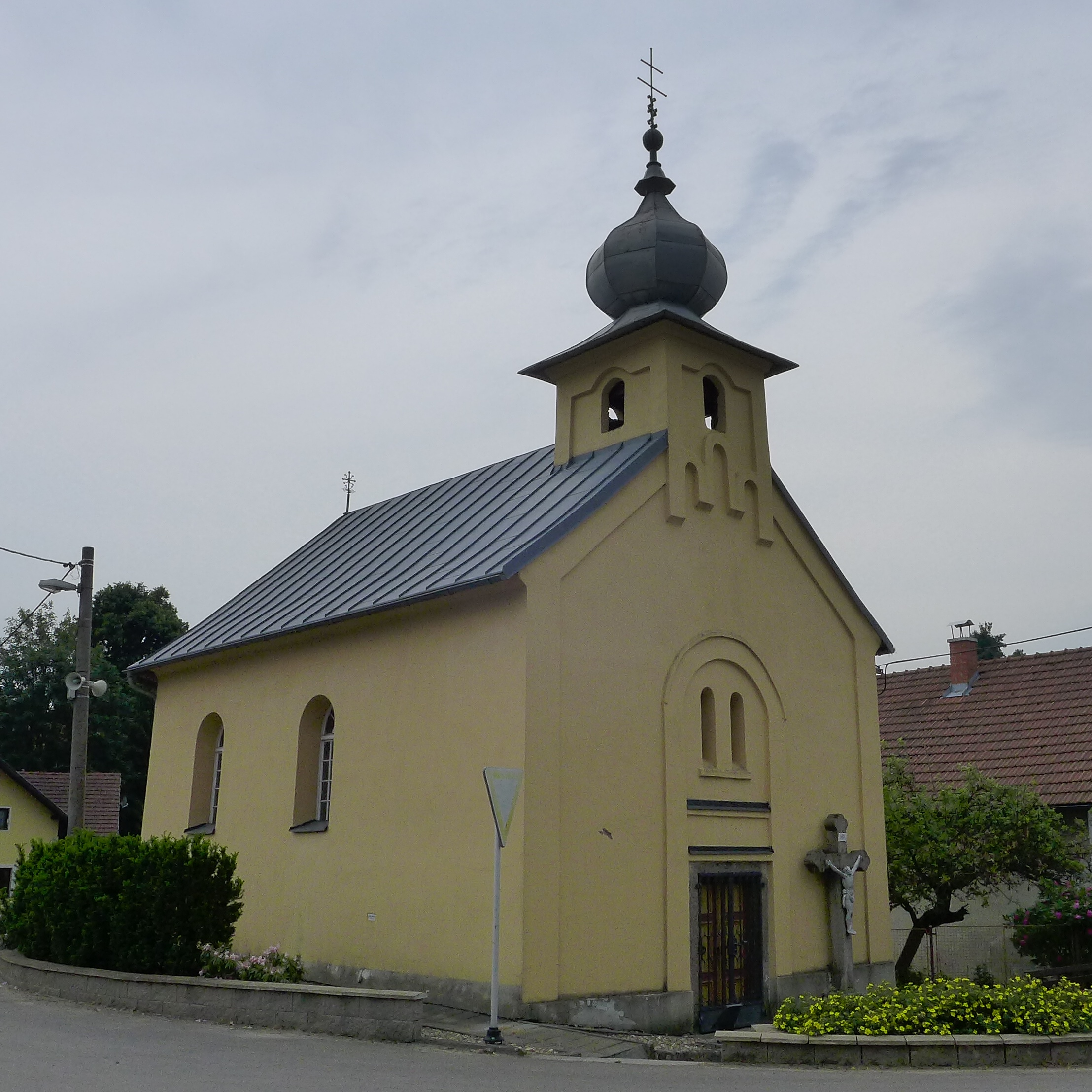
- Chapel of Saint Wendelin

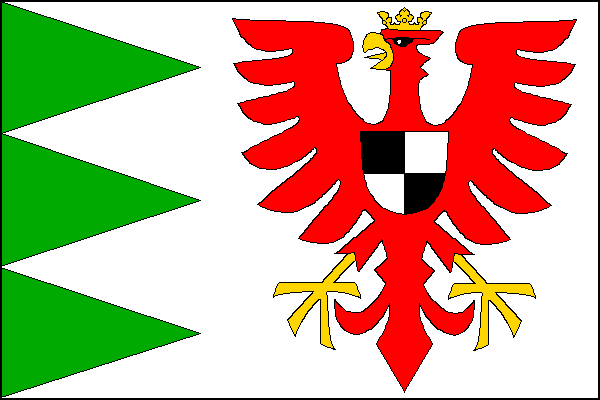
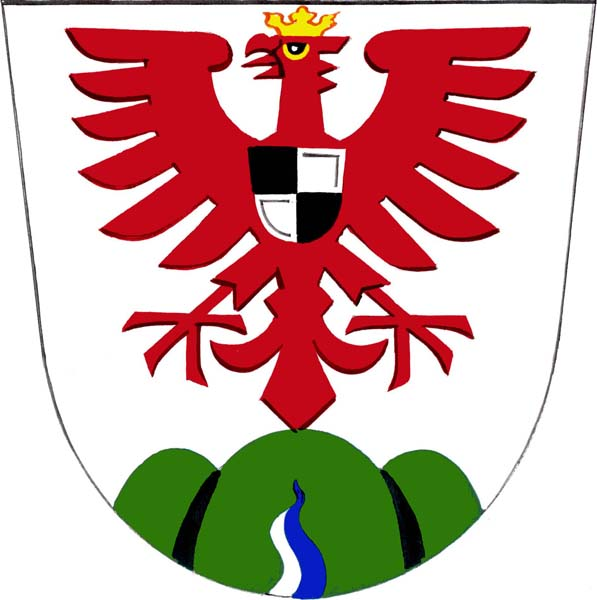
- Flag Coat of arms

- Location in the Czech Republic
- Coordinates: 49°26′10″N 15°49′19″E
- Country: Czech Republic
- Region: Vysočina
- District: Jihlava
- First mentioned: 1407

Area
  - Total: 11.36 km^{2} (4.39 sq mi)
- Elevation: 540 m (1,770 ft)

Population (2026-01-01)
  - Total: 200
  - Density: 18/km^{2} (46/sq mi)
- Time zone: UTC+1 (CET)
  - Summer (DST): UTC+2 (CEST)
- Postal code: 588 27
- Website: www.obecarnolec.cz

Arnolec (Czech pronunciation: [ˈarnolɛts]; German: Arnoldsdorf) is a municipality and village in Jihlava District in the Vysočina Region of the Czech Republic. It has about 200 inhabitants.

Arnolec lies approximately 18 kilometres (11 mi) east of Jihlava and 124 km (77 mi) south-east of Prague.

== Demographics ==
Historical population
Year	Pop.	±%
1869	357	—
1880	393	+10.1%
1890	390	−0.8%
1900	379	−2.8%
1910	374	−1.3%
1921	376	+0.5%
1930	354	−5.9%
1950	247	−30.2%
1961	271	+9.7%
1970	247	−8.9%
1980	241	−2.4%
1991	228	−5.4%
2001	184	−19.3%
2011	157	−14.7%
2021	174	+10.8%
Source: Censuses
