= History of the Argentina national football team =

The history of the Argentina national football team begins with their first official match, played on 20 July 1902 against Uruguay, a 6–0 win in Paso del Molino, Montevideo. One year before, there had been a precedent when representatives from both sides met in a match also in Montevideo, although it was not organised by any association and therefore is not considered official.

Since their inception in 1902, the Argentina national team has appeared in seven FIFA World Cup finals, including the inaugural final in 1930, 1978 (when the team won its first World Cup beating the Netherlands), 1986 (winning its second World Cup after defeating West Germany), 1990, 2014, 2022 (when the team won its third World Cup after defeating France) and 2026 (where they lost to Spain).

Argentina has been very successful in the Copa América, winning it 16 times. The team also won the FIFA Confederations Cup and the Kirin Cup, both in 1992, and the Argentine Olympic team won the Olympics football tournaments in Athens 2004 and Beijing 2008.

Argentina is the most successful team in the CONMEBOL–UEFA Cup of Champions, having won it twice, in 1993 and 2022. As of 2024, Argentina holds the record for most official titles won by a men's national team, with 23.

== History ==
=== Beginning and first titles ===
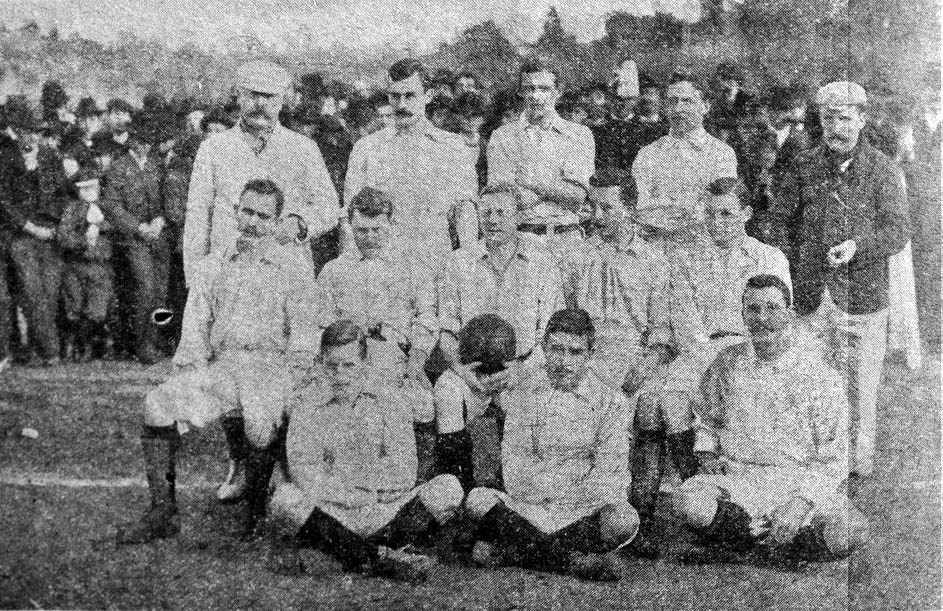
Argentina before playing its first official match against Uruguay, on July 20, 1902. This is also the first photo recorded of an Argentina national team

Although the first match ever recorded by an Argentine side was played on 16 May 1901 against Uruguay, this is not considered an official game due to the match not being organized by Uruguay's Football Association but by Albion FC in its home field, "Paso del Molino". The Uruguayan side had nine players from that club and the remainder from Nacional. Argentina won the match 3–2.

The match considered the first official game played by Argentina, was held in the same venue, on 20 July 1902 against Uruguay. Argentina defeated the Uruguayan side 6–0. The line-up was: José Buruca Laforia (Barracas A.C.), William Leslie (Quilmes), Walter Buchanan (Alumni), Eduardo Patricio Duggan (Belgrano A.C.), Carlos J. Buchanan (Alumni), Ernesto Brown (Alumni), Edward O. Morgan (Quilmes), Juan José Moore (cap.) (Alumni), Juan O. Anderson (Lomas A.C.), Carlos Edgar Dickinson (Belgrano A.C.), Jorge Brown (Alumni). The goals were scored by Dickinson, Arímalo, Morgan, Carve Urioste, Anderson and J. Brown.

During its first years of existence, the national team played only friendly matches until 1905, when the first edition of Lipton Cup was held. It was a cup organized by both the Argentine and Uruguayan Football Associations, with its last edition being contested in 1992. The first official title won by Argentina was the 1906 Copa Lipton, defeating Uruguay 2–0 in Montevideo. That same year, Argentina also played the Newton Cup, another competition organized by both associations, earning the trophy after defeating Uruguay 2–1 in Buenos Aires.

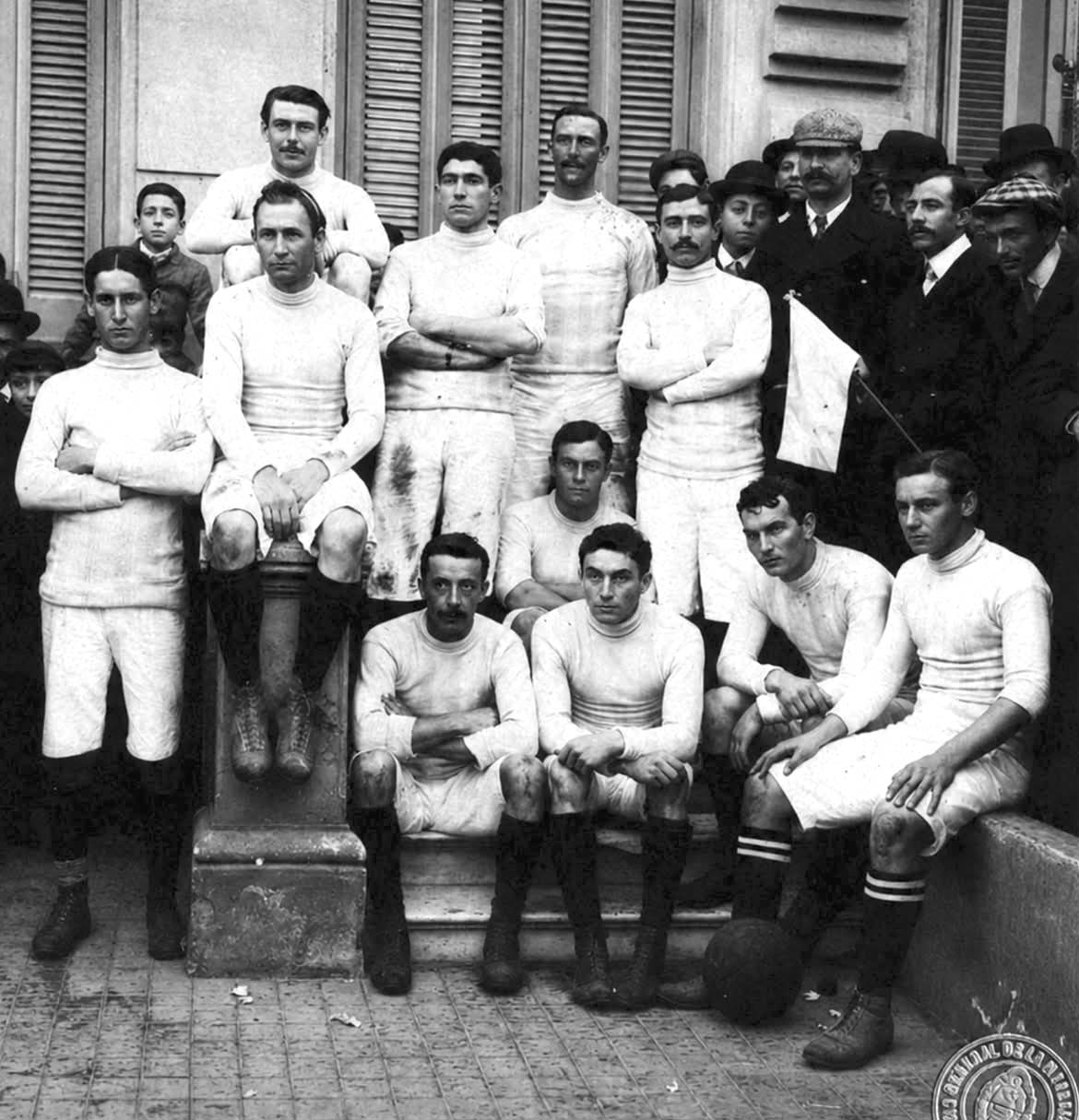
The classic light blue and white-striped jersey first worn on 9 July 1906 in Buenos Aires

On 9 July 1906, Argentina wore the lightblue and white shirt for the first time in a match v South Africa during their tour of South America. The match was held in Sociedad Sportiva Argentina. Since then, the albiceleste shirt has remained as the definitive kit for Argentina. The team's away kits have been in dark blue shades, with the colours of shorts and socks varying from time to time.

In the following years, matches played by the Argentine side were against South American teams only. The reasons varied, from the long time the trips took to other countries at that time to World War I.

Argentina would win four consecutive Newton Cups from 1907 to 1911, and four Lipton Cups from 1906 to 1909. After some Uruguayan victories, Argentina won the 1913, 1915 and 1916 Lipton and 1916 Newton Cup trophies.

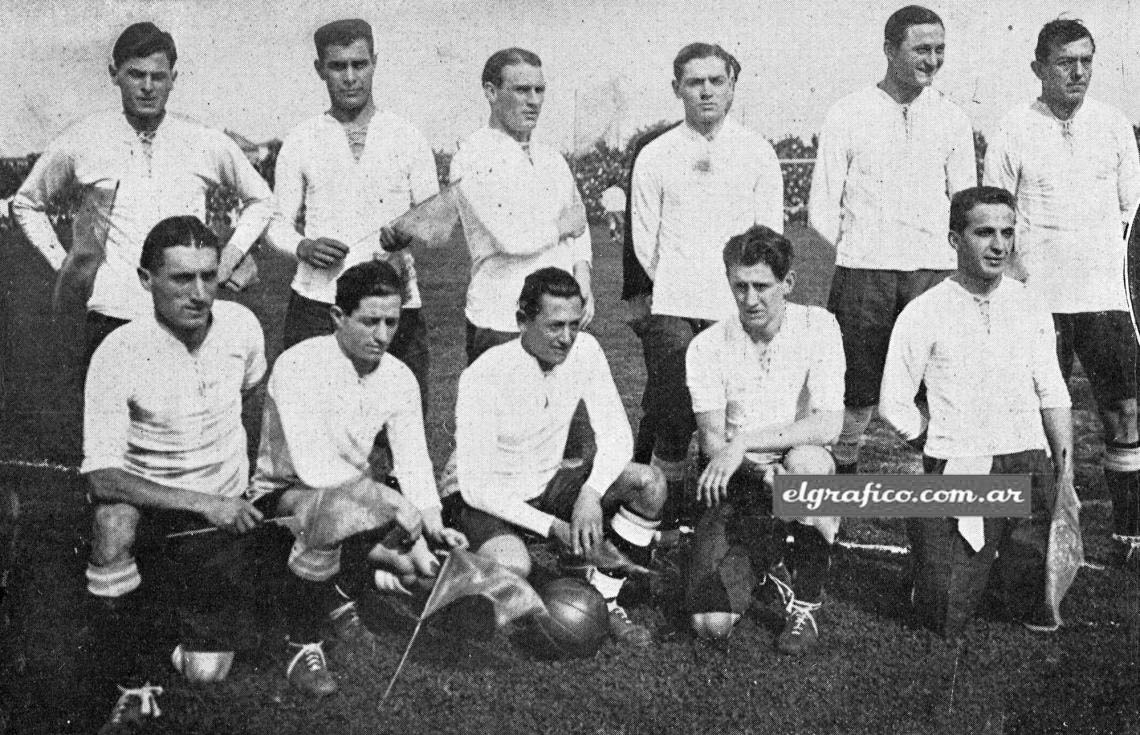
In 1921 Argentina won its first South American Championship

In 1916, Argentina contested the first tournament organized by CONMEBOL, the South American Championship (the current Copa América) hosted in Buenos Aires and Avellaneda and won by Uruguay. The host plus Brazil, Chile and Uruguay were the only teams contesting the inaugural competition. During that tournament Argentina played three matches, defeating Chile 6–0 and drawing Brazil and Uruguay, who became champions on goal difference. The line-up at the final was: Isola, Díaz, Reyes, Martínez, Olazar, Badaracco, Heissinger, Ohaco, H. Hayes, E. Hayes and Perinetti.

Argentina won its first South American championship in 1921, also held in Buenos Aires. The squad won all the games disputed, defeating Brazil, Paraguay and Uruguay to earn six points with no goals received. Notable players of that team were goalkeeper Américo Tesoriere and striker Pedro Calomino. Julio Libonatti was also tournament's top scorer.

=== The Olympic goal ===
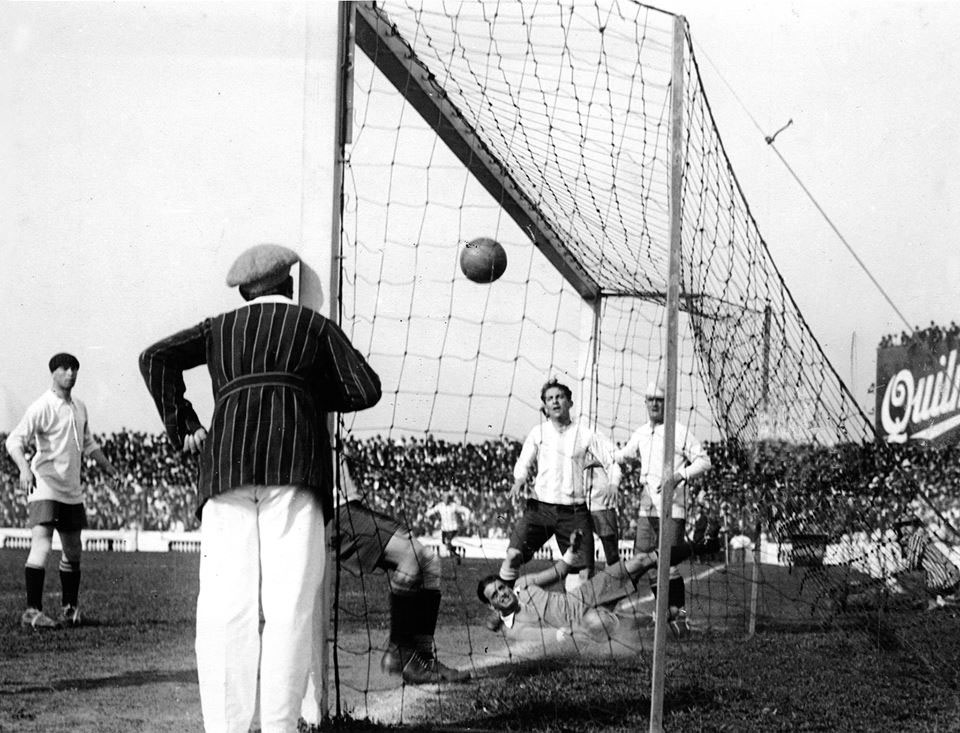
Onzari's olympic goal against Uruguay in 1924.

In 1924, Argentina played a friendly match against Uruguay at Sportivo Barracas' stadium. When only 15 minutes had been played, winger Cesáreo Onzari scored from a corner kick, with no other player touching the ball before scoring. Due to the fact that Uruguay was the Olympic champion, this play was called "Gol Olímpico". This designation remains to this day.

The goal stood since FIFA had previously regulated goals scored directly from the corner kick, as Onzari did during that match. According to La Nación newspaper, 52,000 fans attended the game, an Argentina 2–1 win, where the Uruguayan team left the field with only four minutes to play. Argentine players later complained about the rough play of the Uruguayans during the match, while their rivals also complained about the aggressiveness of local spectators, who threw bottles at them at the end of the match.

In 1925, the South American championship was hosted a third time in Argentina, and the Albiceleste won its second title. The team played four matches and remained unbeaten once more, defeating Paraguay and Brazil twice each. A highmark was the 4–1 victory against rivals Brazil.

Argentina won another consecutive title in 1927 obtaining the South American championship held in Peru. The team had a great campaign, finishing unbeaten with three wins in three games played. The national squad achieved a large victory over Bolivia (7–1), then beating Uruguay 3–2 and the local team 5–1 in the last match of the tournament. It was the third South American title for the Argentina national team.

=== 1928 Summer Olympics ===
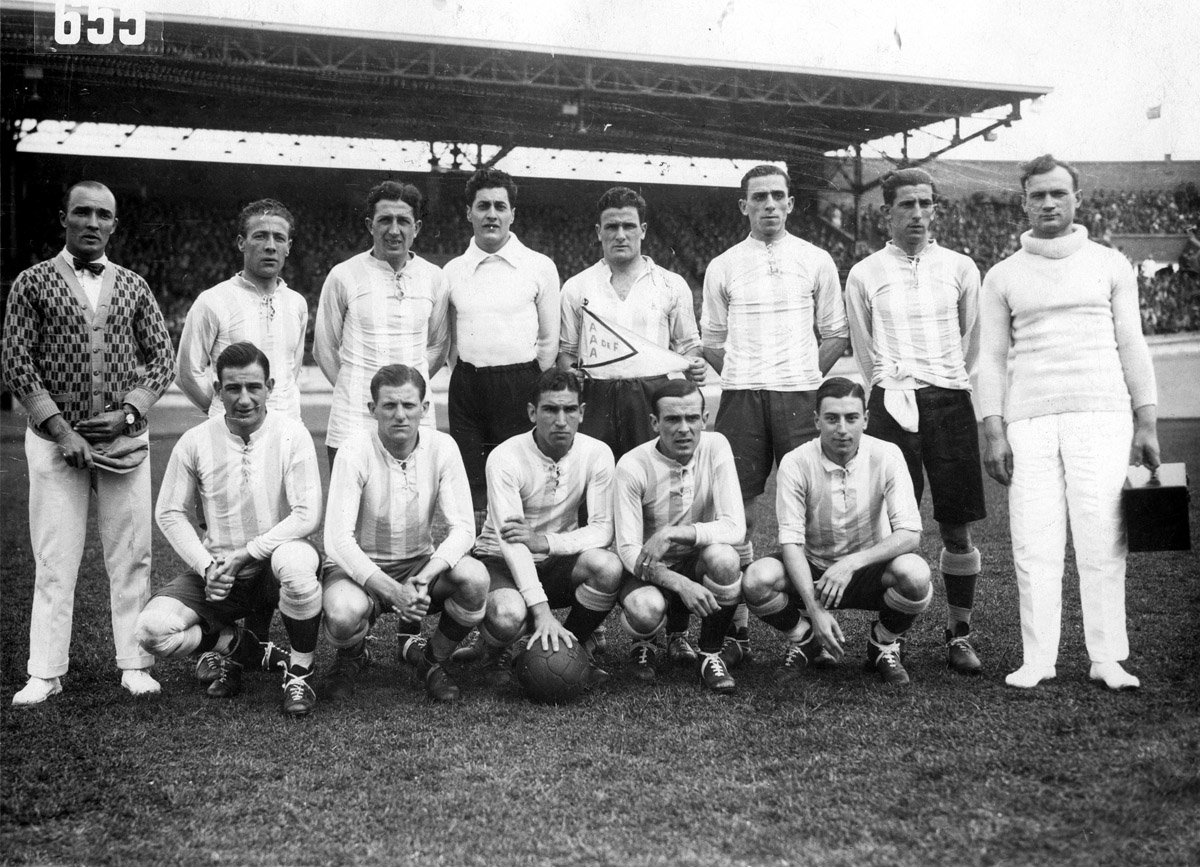
The team that reached the final of the 1928 Summer Olympics.

In 1928, Argentina went to Amsterdam to play the 1928 Summer Olympics, which was the first international tournament played by the national team in its history. The football squad reached the final after trashing the United States 11–2, Belgium 6–3 and Egypt 6–0. The final saw Argentina defeated by Uruguay 2–1, thus winning the silver medal.

=== 1930 World Cup ===
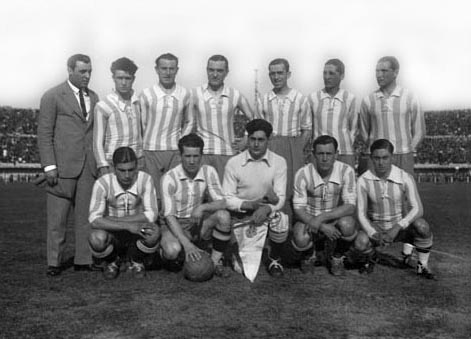
The Argentina squad that played the 1930 World Cup match vs. Mexico.

In 1929, Argentina hosted a new edition of the South American championship, winning its second consecutive title. Argentina finished unbeaten once more, defeating all its rivals in the group: Peru (3–0), Paraguay (4–1) and Uruguay in the last match played in the Estadio Gasómetro of Buenos Aires. Most of players that took part in the team would play for Argentina in the first World Cup organized by FIFA one year later.

Argentina was one of the 13 national teams attending to the inaugural FIFA World Cup hosted by Uruguay.

In the inaugural match of the World Cup, Argentina defeated France 1–0. The national team then beat Mexico 6–3 and finished its run in the first stage by defeating Chile 3–1. Argentina qualified to the semi-finals where the squad widely beat the United States 6–1. On July 30, Argentina played its first World Cup final against Uruguay, but lost 4–2.

=== 1934–54: A long absence ===
Argentina played only one game at the next World Cup in Italy in 1934. The tournament format was a knockout tournament, and Argentina lost its only match 3–2 to Sweden. Argentina would not participate in the 1938 World Cup in France, the last before World War II. The first World Cup after the War was the 1950 World Cup held in Brazil, but Argentina did not enter the competition due to a conflict with the Brazilian Football Confederation. For the 1954 World Cup in Switzerland, Argentina refused to participate.

In 1951, Argentina played England for the first time and were defeated 2–1 at Wembley Stadium. The second leg was played in Buenos Aires on 14 June 1953, where Argentina won 3–1, though the match caused great repercussions in Argentina.

=== From Los Carasucias to the 1958 disaster ===
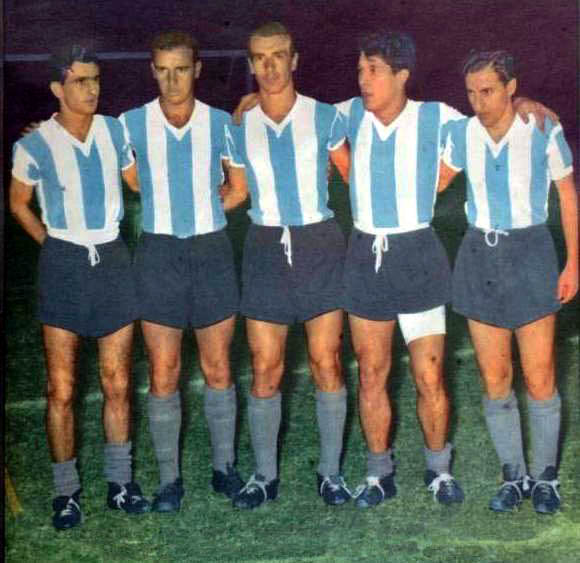
Los Carasucias: Corbatta, Maschio, Angelillo, Sívori and Cruz.

Although Argentina did not contest any World Cups from 1938 to 1954, the team won the 1937, 1941, 1945, 1946, 1947, 1955 and 1957 South American championships, all squads coached by Guillermo Stábile.

The 1957 squad is probably the most remembered team of those years because of its skilled players and exquisite style of playing showed on the field. Argentina thrashed Colombia (8–2), Ecuador (3–0), Uruguay (4–0), Chile (6–2) and Brazil (3–0). The team was defeated by Peru in the last game but won the tournament due to finishing first in its group. The attacking line, formed by Oreste Corbatta, Humberto Maschio, Antonio Angelillo, Omar Sívori and Osvaldo Cruz, was widely praised, being still remembered by the media and football fans. Maschio was also the topscorer with 9 goals.

Argentina returned to a World Cup competition after 24 years, more precisely to the 1958 held in Sweden. The team suffered the absence of Maschio, Angelillo and Sívori (playing in the Italian first division but not called by Stábile for the tournament), who had made outstanding performances in Lima one year before. Although the squad was formed with valued players, the lack of experience facing European squads was evidenced once the tournament finished. Argentina lost to West Germany 3–1 in the first game, though they came back to defeat Northern Ireland in the second match. Argentina was finally thrashed by Czechoslovakia 6–1, one of the worst defeats of a national team in a World Cup and being eliminated from the competition. The poor performance was called "El desastre de Suecia" ("The disaster of Sweden"). After the team arrived in Buenos Aires, 10,000 people were waiting in the Ezeiza International Airport to insult them.

=== Transition ===
After the "Sweden disaster", Argentina returned to official competitions in 1959, winning a new edition of the Copa América, its 12th title. The team thrashed Chile 6–1 at the debut, then beat Bolivia 2–0, Peru and Paraguay 3–1, Uruguay 4–1 and finished with a 1–1 draw against Brazil. Argentina remained unbeaten, winning five of six matches played. The team was coached by a triumvirate composed by Victorio Spinetto, José Della Torre and José Barreiro, replacing Guillermo Stábile after his 19-year tenure in the national team. Argentina would not win a Copa América until 1991 Copa América, when the team coached by Alfio Basile obtained the trophy in Chile.

In 1959, José Manuel Moreno became Argentina coach, although he did not spend much time with the team. Under his coaching Argentina disputed the South American championship in Ecuador, where the squad defeated Paraguay 4–2, drew the hosts 1–1 and suffered a large defeat, 5–0, at the hands of Uruguay, although the team achieved a great 4–1 victory against Brazil with three goals by José Sanfilippo in the last match. Once the tournament finished, Moreno left his place and Guillermo Stábile started his 2nd period as coach of the Argentina national team.

In 1960, Argentina won its first and only Pan American championship held in San José, Costa Rica. That same year the team suffered three losses to Brazil: two of them in the Roca Cup and the next in the Atlantic Cup. That was the last match where Argentina was coached by Stábile in his second tenure. He would be replaced by Victorio Spinetto.

In 1961, Argentina started a tour across Europe, playing several matches against local national teams. The squad only achieved one victory against Portugal with two losses and two draws. After a short period coached by José D'Amico, Juan Carlos Lorenzo took over the team. Argentina had a poor performance at the 1962 World Cup, being defeated by England (3–1) to be eliminated from the tournament.

In the 1963 South American Championship, Argentina finished third in the tournament, although the team achieved important victories over Brazil (3–0), Ecuador and Colombia, but lost to Bolivia and Peru. That same year, Argentina was also defeated by Brazil in the Roca Cup.

=== Nation's Cup ===
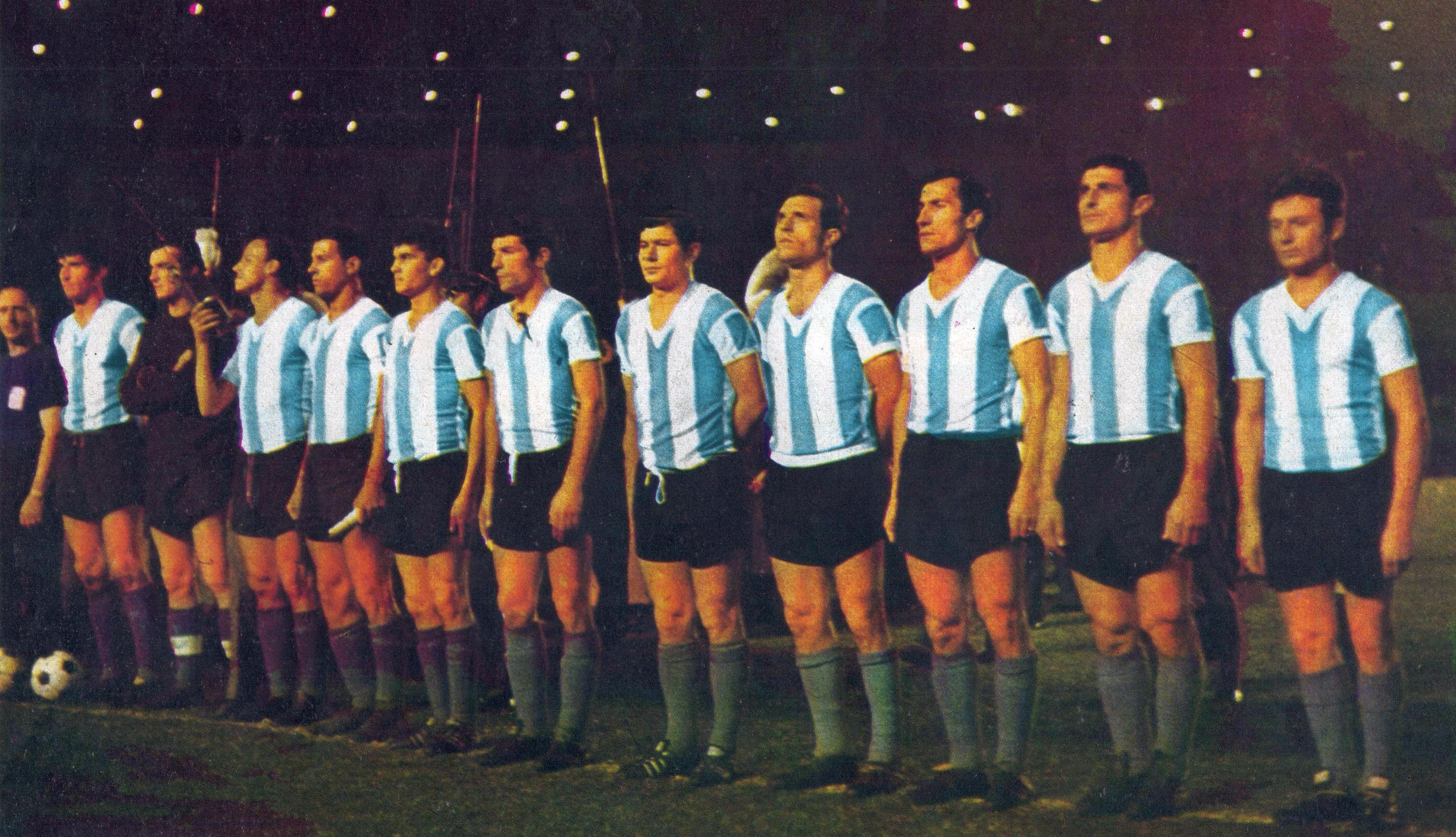
The team that won the Nations' Cup in 1964

In 1964, Argentina won the Nations' Cup, a friendly tournament organized by the Brazilian Association to commemorate its 50th anniversary. Argentina took part of the championship with the debut of José María Minella as coach, along with the local squad, England and Portugal. Then called "a little World Cup", the Nations' Cup is considered "the first great title" won by Argentina. The team remained unbeaten winning all the matches played, with a large 3–0 over Brazil. The victory over Brazil was highly praised by the media due to the Brazilians not being defeated as hosts since the 1950 World Cup final. Argentina finished the tournament with no goals received.

=== The transition continues: 1965–74 ===
Argentina, still coached by Minella, qualified to the 1966 World Cup held in England for the first time. The team shared their group with Chile, Paraguay and Bolivia. Argentina finished the round unbeaten with three matches won and two draws. Minella left the team, being replaced by Osvaldo Zubeldía after qualification was over. Juan Carlos Lorenzo took over the squad, beginning his second tenure with the national side.

The national side played several friendly matches against the Soviet Union, Poland and Italy before its flight to England. Argentina only drew the first two games and was defeated in the last in Torino.

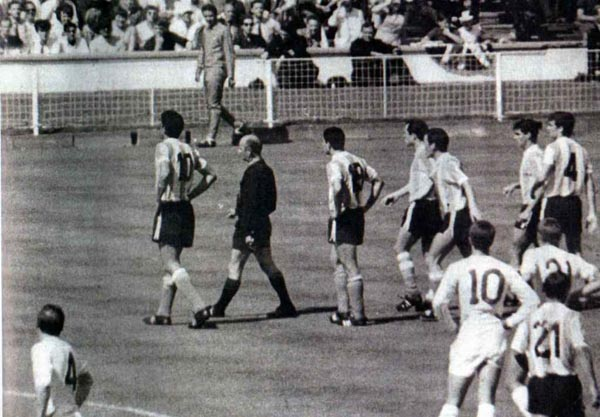
Antonio Rattín (#10) was sent off by referee Kreitlein in the match against England.

Argentina made its debut in Group 2 of the World Cup, defeating Spain 2–1. The next matches were against West Germany, which ended 0–0 and Switzerland where Argentina also won 2–1. Argentina qualified to the quarter-finals where the team was defeated by the host team 1–0. It was a controversial match where midfielder Antonio Rattín was sent off by German referee Rudolf Kreitlein for "violence of the tongue", despite the referee speaking no Spanish. Rattín was so incensed with the decision, believing the referee to be biased in favour of England, that he refused to leave. As a way to show his disgust, he sat on the red carpet exclusively meant for the Queen to walk on. He eventually had to be escorted from the field by two policemen and as a final sign of disgust, wrinkled at a British pennant before being escorted out. This incident, and others surrounding the same game, arguably started the long-lasting rivalry between both national teams, although on the other hand, it also allowed for the institution of yellow and red cards into football, a solution devised by FIFA after the spark that set off the incident.

Although Argentina did not have a great performance in England, the players were well received by the crowd in Ezeiza, in part due to the incident with Rattín and the Queen's carpet, where Rattín himself later saying that he "didn't know where he had sat on".

The next step for the team was the 1967 Copa América, hosted by Uruguay. Argentina made a good campaign, winning five over six matches disputed, being defeated only by the host team and finished second.

During 1967 and 1969, the Football Association named four different coaches to the national team: Carmelo Faraone, who only coached two matches, Renato Cesarini, José M. Minella, Humberto Maschio and Adolfo Pedernera. In those years, Argentina played a series of friendly matches with most of them being South American teams and a few European teams. Argentina also played a new edition of the Lipton Cup, obtaining it by goal average over Uruguay.

In 1969, Argentina began qualifying for the 1970 World Cup under Pedernera. The national squad shared its group with Bolivia and Peru, losing the first two games played as the away team. Although Argentina won the next game (over Bolivia, 1–0), the 2–2 draw against Peru in the last fixture (played at La Bombonera) allowed the Peruvian squad to be one of the South American representatives in the World Cup, eliminating Argentina. To date, this remains the only time that Argentina has failed to qualify for a World Cup in which it entered a team. This poor performance that caused the absence of a national representative in the 1970 World Cup is still regarded as one of Argentina's biggest frustrations in its history.

After the frustration of 1969, the Association named Juan José Pizzuti, who had won the Intercontinental Cup with Racing Club three years before, as coach of the national team. Pizzuti was the manager during three years, in which Argentina played several friendly games against South American teams, which included the 1971 Roca Cup title (shared with Brazil). In 1972, Argentina was invited to play the Brazil Independence Cup, where the team did not achieve good results.

After the Independence Cup, Pizzuti was replaced by Omar Sívori, the most notable player of the 1957 Copa América triumph and had previous experience as manager of Rosario Central and Estudiantes de La Plata. Argentina played some friendly matches as preparation for qualifying, with some interesting results such as a 3–2 over West Germany in Munich.

=== "The Ghost Team" and 1974 World Cup ===
Qualifying for the 1974 World Cup began in September 1973, where Argentina shared its group with Bolivia and Paraguay. Bolivia used to play its home venues at La Paz, where Argentine players suffered the lack of oxygen and other effects caused by altitude sickness. To avoid complications, Sívori decide to prepare a team to play in altitude. Following his instructions, Miguel Ignomiriello took many players to Tilcara so they could become acclimatized to altitude.

Argentina won the match played in La Paz 1–0. That team was nicknamed "La Selección Fantasma" ("The Ghost National Team" in Spanish) due to the lack of organisation existing in the Association at the time, meaning the media could not get information about the team during its tenure in Tilcara. A year later, Mario Kempes revealed that the players themselves had to organize some friendly matches to get money to buy food because the Association forgot about them completely.

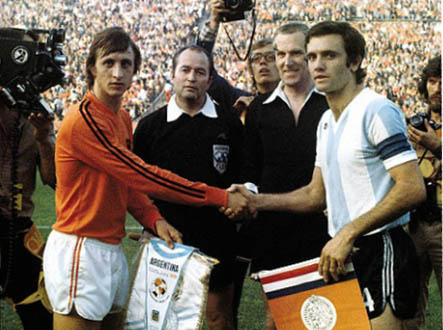
Roberto Perfumo with Netherlands captain Johan Cruyff.

Argentina won the other games against Bolivia and Paraguay (4–0 and 3–1 respectively, both in Buenos Aires), finally qualifying for the World Cup.

After having qualified for the 1974 World Cup, Sívori left and was replaced by Vladislao Cap. With its new coach on the bench, Argentina played only four matches before the competition, facing European teams. Argentina defeated Romania and France and drew England before suffering a defeat to the Netherlands 4–1.

Once more, Argentina had a poor performance in a World Cup. They were defeated by Poland in their opening game 3–2, followed by a 1–1 draw with Italy. In the last game of the first round, Argentina defeated Haiti 4–1, granting qualification to the second round of the tournament, where the team lost to the Netherlands and Brazil, and ending with a 1–1 draw to East Germany. Argentina finished last in the group table and eighth in the overall table.

=== The Menotti era: Beginning of greatness ===
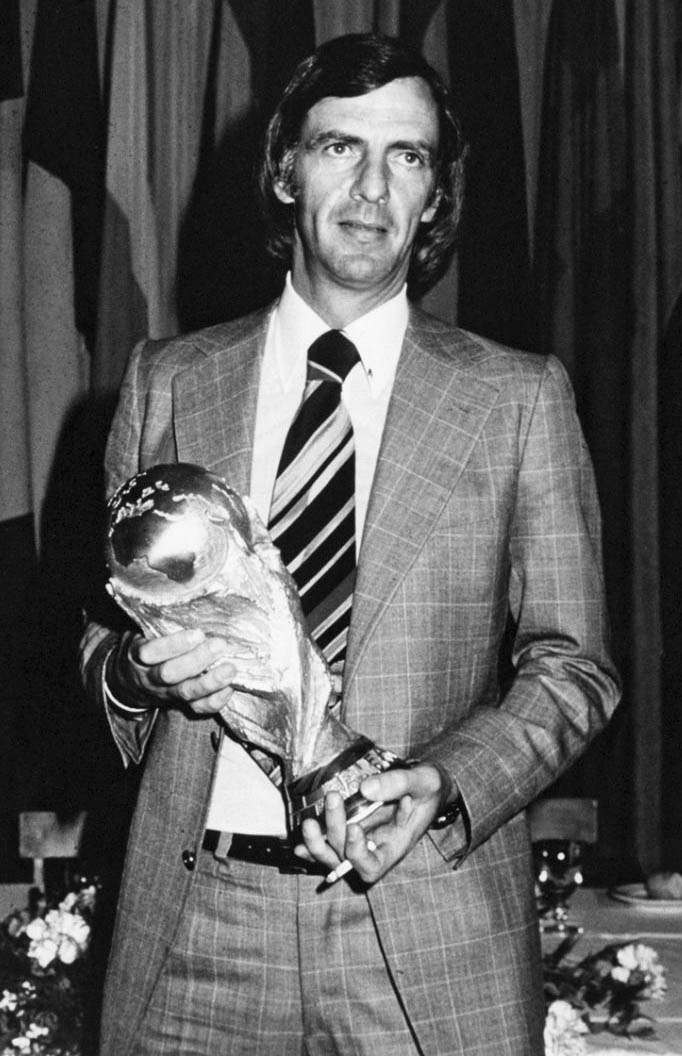
César Menotti was the manager who won the FIFA World Cup for the first time in 1978 with Argentina.

The demise of the team in the World Cup forced the Association to make changes in Argentine football. David Bracuto was named president of the Football Association in 1974. He offered César Luis Menotti the head coaching role of Argentina, which Menotti accepted under several conditions, one being that native players under 25 should not be sold to foreign clubs.

Menotti debuted on 12 October 1974 in a friendly match against Spain. Argentina began a long preparation for the 1978 World Cup which would be hosted on home soil for the very first time, playing friendly matches and tournaments. During those years, Argentina played a total of 33 matches. The year 1977 was also the international debut of Diego Maradona, who played for the first time at age 16 against Hungary. The match was held in Buenos Aires with a large victory for Argentina by a 5–1 scoreline.

==== 1975 Copa América ====
Argentina also played a new edition of Copa América, where for the first time there was no fixed venue. All matches were played throughout each country across the tournament. Argentina debuted thrashing Venezuela but lost to Brazil in the two games played (2–1 and 1–0). Brazil qualified to the next stage and the national team was eliminated.

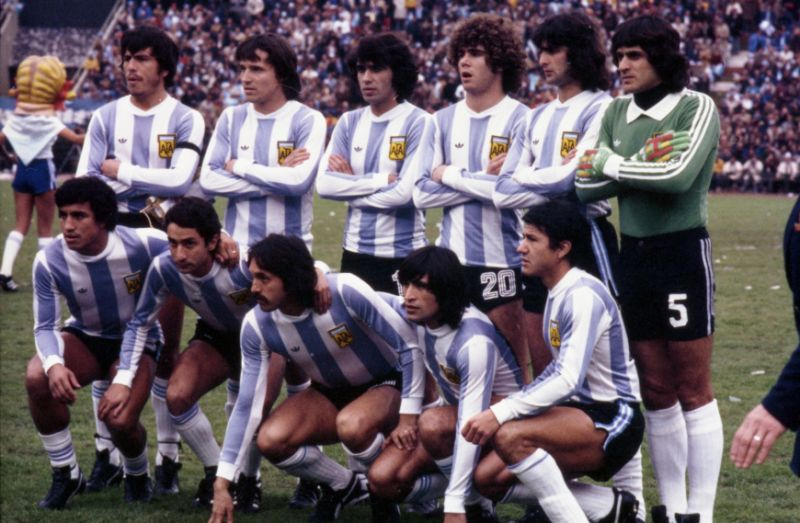
Argentina host the FIFA World Cup for the first time in 1978.

In 1978, the final preparations for the World Cup began, playing several matches against South American and European teams. Although Maradona was considered one of the best players in the world, Menotti did not include him in the definitive list for the tournament.The Argentine military junta that ruled Argentina by then pushed Menotti to include River Plate's midfielder Norberto Alonso instead of Maradona, and that Menotti almost certainly knew that the prodigiously talented 17-year old would not be able to handle the immense pressure and attention in the biggest sporting event in Argentina's history. Nevertheless, other journalists assert that there were too many offensive midfielders.

==== 1978 FIFA World Cup ====
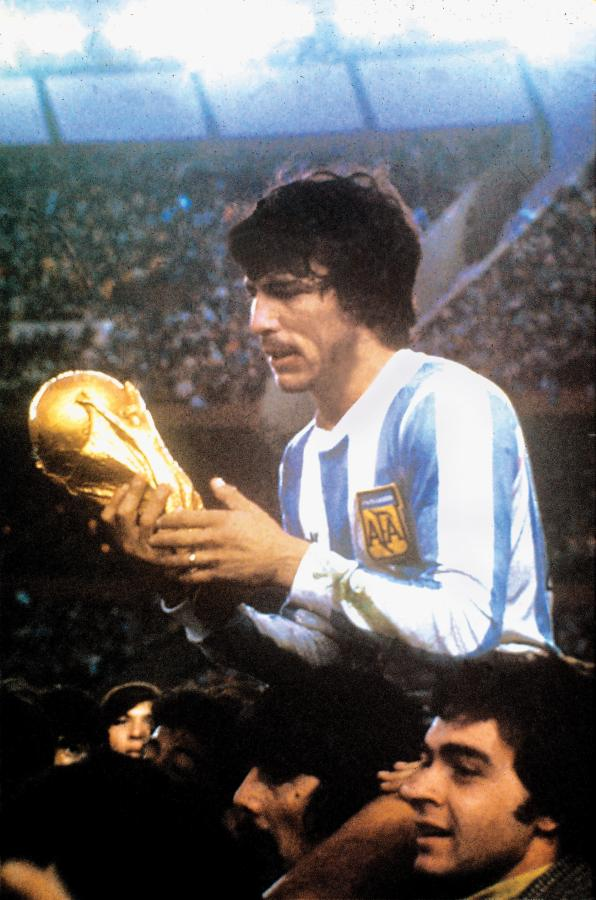
Passarella holding the FIFA World Cup Trophy after the 1978 final.

Argentina finally debuted on 2 June 1978 against Hungary, winning 2–1. Argentina defeated France 2–1 in the second game and qualifying for the second stage, although the team lost to Italy 1–0, finishing second in Group A. In the second round Argentina was placed in Group 1 sharing it with Brazil, Poland and Peru. In the first game, Argentina beat Poland 2–0, with both goals from Mario Kempes. Next game was against South American powerhouse Brazil in which the game ended with a 0–0 draw. The last game was against Peru, a rival that Argentina easily defeated with a 6–0 win. Argentina was able to edge out Brazil in the group and went on to the final. Argentina had to beat Peru by four goals or more to progress. The nature of Argentina's victory has fueled rumors that the match was fixed.

That large victory over Peru allowed Argentina to play in the final. On 25 June 1978, at River Plate's Estadio Monumental in Buenos Aires, Argentina played its second World Cup final. Mario Kempes gave Argentina the lead in the 38th minute, with the Dutch squad able to respond in the 82nd minute for the equalizer. The game went to extra time and Mario Kempes once again gave the Argentines the lead and Daniel Bertoni added another goal which sealed the win for Argentina, which became the second South American team to win the World Cup at its home soil. Kempes was not only the most notable player of the team but also the top scorer of the tournament with six goals.

==== 1979 Copa América ====
After the success of the World Cup, Menotti continued as coach and Argentina played some friendly matches as preparation for the 1979 Copa América. Maradona scored his first goal for the Senior team against Scotland in Glasgow, where Argentina won 3–1.

==== 1979 FIFA World Youth Championship ====
The highlight of 1979 was the 1979 FIFA World Youth Championship obtained by the under-20 team in Tokyo. The team, also coached by Menotti, won the tournament with Maradona and Ramón Díaz as the leaders and most notable players of the squad. The tournament was also the first official championship played by Maradona in a national team.

==== 1980 Mundialito ====
Due to Argentina needing no qualifiers to the next World Cup as holders, the national team played a series of matches as preparation for the competition. In 1980 there were no official tournaments so the team toured in Europe and also hosted friendly games in some of the most important cities of Argentina such as Mar del Plata, Córdoba and Mendoza. Argentina played the 1980 Mundialito, a friendly competition hosted by Uruguay in commemoration of the 50th anniversary of the first World Cup tournament, where the team defeated West Germany and drew with Brazil to be eliminated in the first stage.

==== Demise in 1982: the end of an era and the beginning of the Maradona era ====
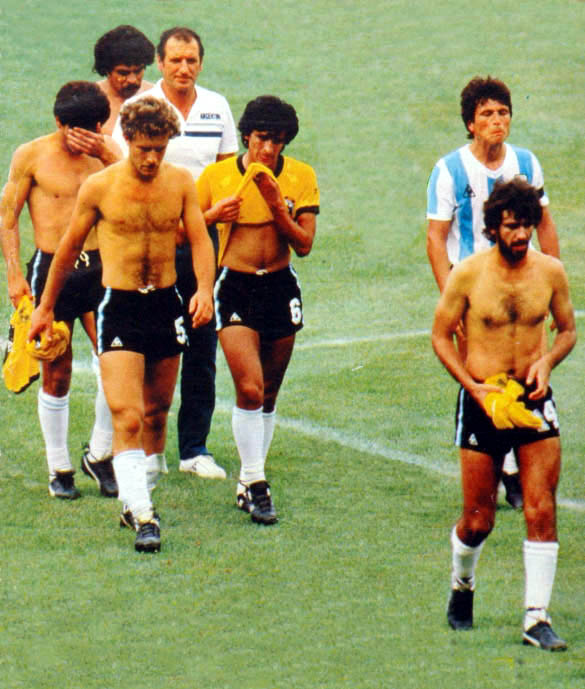
Argentina players leaving the field after being eliminated by Brazil at the 1982 FIFA World Cup.

In 1982 the Argentine squad travelled to Spain to participate in the 1982 World Cup while Argentina was fighting in the Falklands War (Guerra de Malvinas) with the United Kingdom after the invasion of the Falkland Islands had been ordered by president Leopoldo Galtieri on April 2.

The lineup was based on the 1978 team with the addition of Diego Maradona (who had won a domestic title playing at a high level) and Ramón Díaz. The squad arrived in Spain as a big favourite to win the Cup. Argentina debuted with a 1–0 loss to Belgium at Camp Nou in Barcelona. There were internal tensions within the camp between the older and younger players, and this caused problems. Nevertheless, the team recovered by defeating Hungary (4–1) and El Salvador (2–0) therefore qualifying for the next stage. In the second round, Argentina shared a group with Italy and Brazil, being defeated by both (2–1 and 3–1) and eliminated from the championship. Maradona could not show his skills during the tournament, suffering from the rough play of rivals (especially Claudio Gentile in the game against Italy). He would eventually be sent off by the referee after kicking Brazilian player Batista in the groin.

Other players that formed the squad were Juan Barbas, Gabriel Calderón (from the 1979 youth championship-winning team), Patricio Hernández, Julio Olarticoechea, Enzo Trossero and Jorge Valdano.

The failure at the World Cup caused Menotti to leave his post. Despite the poor performances, the national team achieved two world titles (senior and youth) during the nine years with Menotti as coach. That was the first time that Argentina planned and carried out long-term work with clear and serious objectives.

=== Carlos Bilardo era: the road to Mexico ===
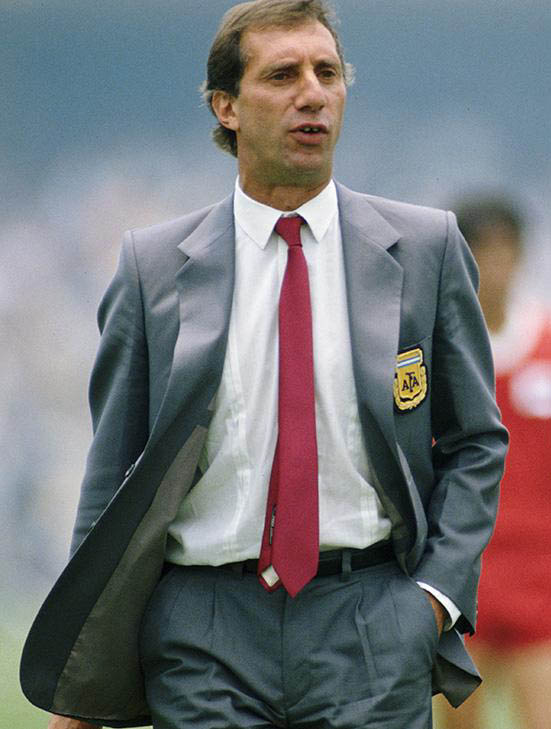
Carlos Bilardo led Argentina to win their second FIFA World Cup in 1986. He also reached with the team the final in 1990.

To replace Menotti, the Football Association choose Carlos Bilardo, who had won the 1982 Metropolitano with Estudiantes de La Plata. Bilardo was famous for his perfectionism and obsession with tactic and strategy of the game, which called the attention as much as followers as critics. The Bilardo era began in May 1983 with a 2–2 draw with Chile in Santiago. Soon after Argentina played the 1983 Copa América, the first official tournament with Bilardo. The squad was eliminated on first round with 3 draws (2 with Ecuador and a 0–0 with Brazil), winning its only match 1–0 to Brazil in Buenos Aires.

The team was formed by footballers playing in domestic Argentine Primera División exclusively, being some of them goalkeepers Ubaldo Fillol and Nery Pumpido, defenders Néstor Clausen, José Luis Brown, Enzo Trossero, Julio Olarticoechea and Roberto Mouzo; midfielders Claudio Marangoni, Jorge Burruchaga, Alejandro Sabella and José Daniel Ponce; forwards Ricardo Gareca, Alberto Márcico.

After the Copa América, Argentina travelled to Calcutta to play the Nehru Cup, then playing a series of friendly matches before the qualifiers to 1986 World Cup in Mexico. The team made a successful tour on Europe where it won the three matches disputed, including a 3–1 against West Germany in Düsseldorf. In May 1985, Argentina played its first qualifying match against Venezuela, winning 3–2. Argentina won three consecutive games, to Colombia (3–1 home, 1–0 away) and Venezuela (3–0 home) but lost to Peru 1–0 in Lima in a match where Peru midfielder Claudio Reyna marked Maradona with excessive roughness, although he was not sent off by the referee.

Argentina played the last match of the qualifiers against Peru in Buenos Aires. The visitor team won by 2–1 qualifying to Mexico, but in the last minutes of the match Ricardo Gareca scored the 2–2 that allowed Argentina to be one of the four South American representatives at Mexico.

Although he led the team to a new qualification for a World Cup, Bilardo was hardly criticized by the media which focused on the low level of the team during the process. Some journalists also accused Bilardo to play defensively, leaving behind the historic Argentine landmark of short passes and dribblings according to their point of view. Clarín, the most popular newspaper of Argentina, was one of the hardest opponents of the coach, and Bilardo himself declared that Clarín called Association President Julio Grondona to ask him to fire the coach.

Before the World Cup, Argentina toured Europe losing to France (one of the favorites to win the Cup) and Norway and largely defeating Israel by 7–2.

==== 1986: Return to glory ====
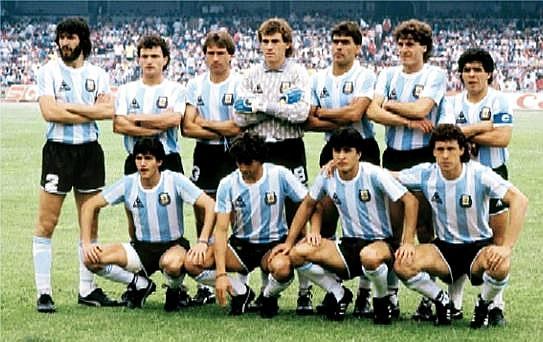
The team that debuted v. South Korea at the Estadio Olimpico Universitario in Mexico City.

Argentina entered the 1986 World Cup with hope because of one player, Diego Maradona. Argentina was placed in Group A alongside Italy, Bulgaria, and South Korea. In the first game, Argentina was able to beat South Korea 3–1. The second match was against Italy, a tougher opponent. Italy took the lead in the sixth minute but Diego Maradona responded with a goal in the 34th minute. The game later ended with a 1–1 draw. The last group game was against Bulgaria, which resulted in a 2–0 Argentina win; therefore Argentina passed to the next round being the first in the group.

My daughter Daniela could not be called by her last name. The word "Bilardo" was banned. I could not walk on the street, I could not get out of my house. After the World Cup, everything changed

— Carlos Bilardo on the previous days to the 1986 World Cup

Argentina entered the round of 16 against South American rivals Uruguay in Puebla. The hot-tempered game ended in a 1–0 win for Argentina. Next, Argentina moved on to the quarter-finals, playing England at the Estadio Azteca in Mexico City. The game started very evenly, with both teams getting chances to score but none were able to finish. The first half ended with Argentina having the majority of possession but unable to get past a tough defense. Six minutes following the second half, Maradona scored a controversial goal in which he used his hand; once the match finished, Maradona called it "la mano de Dios" ("the hand of God"), explicitly admitting the infringement. The goal began with a defensive error from Steve Hodge, who passed the ball incorrectly back to his goalkeeper, Peter Shilton. At that time, Maradona was still continuing his run and reached the ball first and netted it in with his left fist. After the goal, Maradona encouraged his teammates to embrace the goal so the referee would allow it. Four minutes after the "hand of God" goal, Maradona scored a goal which people called "The Goal of the Century" because of the individual effort of Maradona, who starting his run from the half-way line, passed four English midfielders (he beat midfielder Terry Butcher twice) and dribbled around Shilton, finally scoring the goal which allowed Argentina to win the match, 2–1. That victory was very celebrated due to not only the rivalry between both teams but Argentina had lost the Falklands War at the hands of the British Army four years prior.

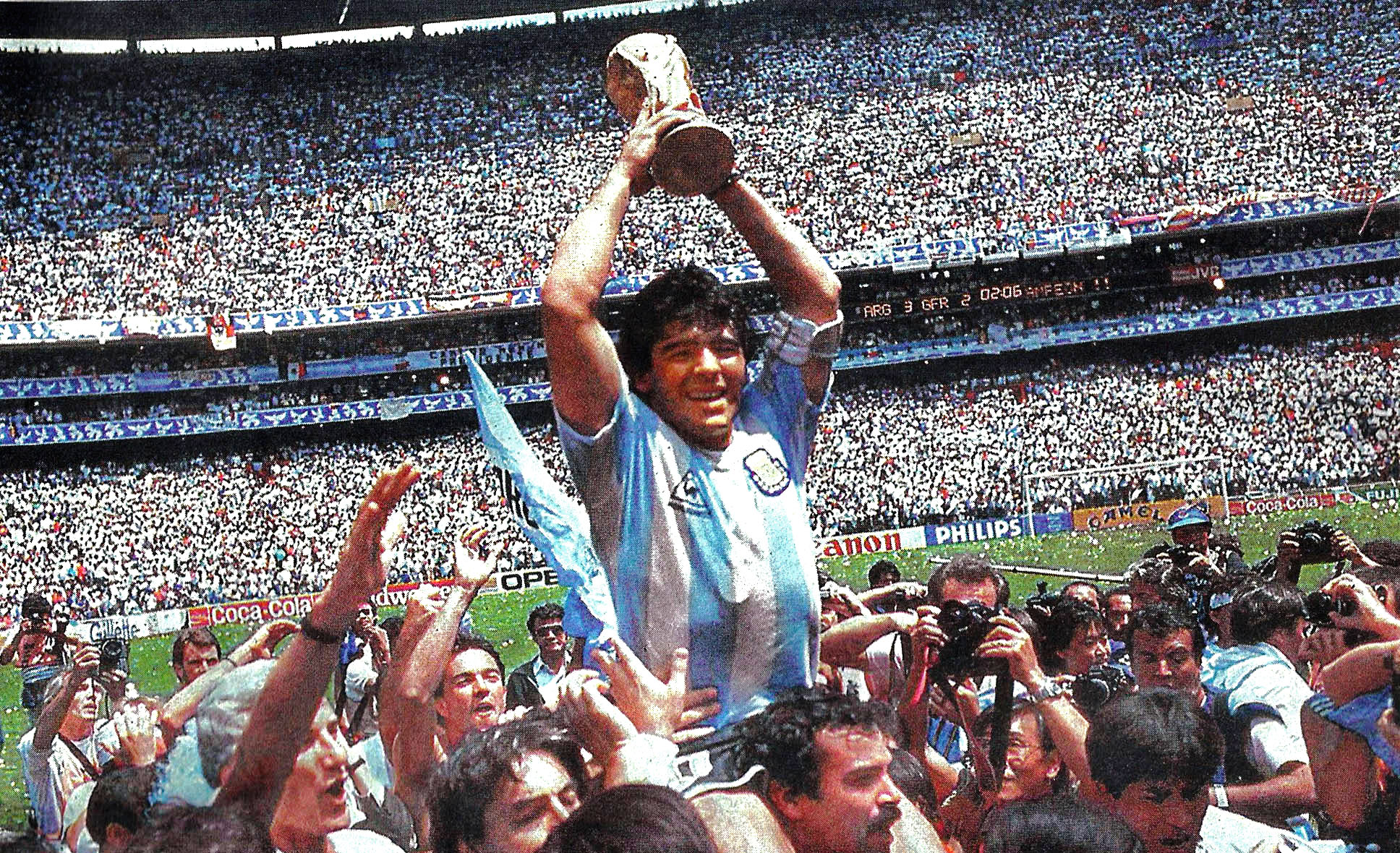
Diego Maradona raising the FIFA World Cup trophy at the Estadio Azteca in Mexico City.

In the semi-finals, Argentina defeated Belgium 2–0 at the Estadio Azteca to advance to the final against West Germany. Argentina won a game played at the Azteca in which the squad won its second World Cup title. José Luis Brown opened the scoring for Argentina, then the team increased the lead with a goal by Jorge Valdano. Germany started a comeback with goals from Karl-Heinz Rummenigge and Rudi Völler, which evened the game at 2–2. Jorge Burruchaga scored the winning goal in the 83rd minute, giving Argentina a 3–2 victory over Germany.

Argentina remained unbeaten in the World Cup, winning five over six matches disputed. Maradona played at a superlative level, as he had done in the 1979 Youth Championship leading Argentina to the title. Maradona was the national team top-scorer with five goals, apart from winning the Gold Ball as the best player of the tournament.

Other important players for the team were defenders José Luis Brown and Oscar Ruggeri, midfielders Héctor Enrique and Jorge Burruchaga and forward Jorge Valdano. The line-up in the final was: Nery Pumpido, Brown, José Luis Cuciuffo, Ruggeri, Julio Olarticoechea; Ricardo Giusti, Sergio Batista, Enrique, Burruchaga; Maradona, Valdano.

==== 1987–1990 ====
After winning the World Cup, the players went on vacation and Argentina did not play a match until 1987, when a new edition of Copa América was contested. The tournament changed its format, returning to a unique host where Argentina was chosen. Argentine formed a team with a mix of players from European and local leagues. The squad debuted with a 1–1 draw against Perú, then beat Ecuador 3–0. In the second stage, Argentina lost to Uruguay (which would be the champion) 1–0 in Buenos Aires and was eliminated. At the end of 1987, Argentina played West Germany (the rival of the 1986 final) winning 1–0 at the Estadio José Amalfitani. In 1988, the squad played the Four Nations Cup, losing to the Soviet Union (4–2) and West Germany (1–0).

Argentina immediately went to Australia to contest the Australia Bicentennial Gold Cup, where the team did not have a good performance, with one win against Saudi Arabia and a large defeat by the local team (4–1).

Back to Argentina, the team started its preparation for the 1989 Copa América, held in Brazil. Argentina qualified to the second round after beating Chile and Uruguay (both 1–0) and two draws with Ecuador and Bolivia (both 0–0). In the second stage, Argentina lost to Brazil and Uruguay (both 2–0) and only drew with Paraguay (0–0). Argentina was eliminated without winning a game and with no goals scored on this round. Some players of the team were Pumpido, Brown, Ruggeri, Clausen, Cuciuffo, Burruchaga, Maradona, Enrique, Giusti (all of them world champions in 1986), Claudio Caniggia, Abel Balbo, Luis Islas, Roberto Sensini, Gabriel Calderón, Néstor Gorosito and Pedro Troglio.

==== 1990: Finalist again ====
Argentina went to the 1990 World Cup with no qualifiers needed as being the previous champion. Prior to the World Cup, the national team played some several matches with no good results: Argentina lost to Mexico (0–2) and Scotland (0–2), winning just one of the five games played (to Israel, chosen again to be the last rival before the tournament as it had been four years before). In addition, Jorge Valdano (one of the most important players during the 1986 World Cup) trained hard in order to be in good physical condition for the Cup, but Bilardo decided not to include him in the definitive list of players. To that, Valdano said, "I swam through the ocean but I drowned at the shore." In addition to Valdano not playing, a number of other important players were injured, so Argentina resorted to cynical tactics on the field, as they knew they could not win easily in a straight fight.

Argentina finally debuted at the inaugural match at the San Siro in Milan, being defeated by Cameroon (1–0). This result caused a great surprise in Argentina so the national team line-up was based on the 1986 world champion.

Argentina won its second match against the Soviet Union 2–0 (where titular goalkeeper was Nery Pumpido seriously injured, being replaced by Sergio Goycochea for the rest of the tournament), and drew 1–1 with Romania in the last match of first round, both played in Naples, where Maradona played for Napoli in the Serie A. The team qualified to the second round, where they faced Brazil at the Stadio delle Alpi in Turin. In a match where Brazil played much better than Argentina, with forwards Müller and Careca repeatedly shooting to the goal but missing the target (the ball clashed Argentina's posts a couple of times, while Goycoechea stopped other shots) Argentina (with Maradona in bad physical condition) resisted Brazilian offensive movements during the first half, which ended 0–0. In the second half, Brazil was not so persistent as it had been during the first 45 minutes, so Argentina took advantage of the situation. With nine minutes till full-time, Maradona took the ball in the centre of the field, dribbled past three opponents and made a precise pass to winger Claudio Caniggia, who advanced with the ball to a goal after dribbling around goalkeeper Cláudio Taffarel. Argentina won the match 1–0, eliminating its arch-rival in a World Cup for the first time. That match is still regarded by the media and fans as one of the most remarkable moments of an Argentina national team.

For their quarter-final match in Florence, Argentina narrowly eliminated Yugoslavia in an exciting penalty shootout, with Goycoechea becoming a hero after stopping three penalty kicks, including the last two. Maradona also missed a penalty kick, a rare occurrence; at one point Argentina were behind the Yugoslavs, but Goycoechea's outstanding goalkeeping kept Argentina in the tournament.

Argentina advanced to the semi-finals where it played against Italy in Naples. The local host was considered favourite to win the match because their striker Salvatore Schillaci was the tournament's top scorer (he would be awarded both the Golden Boot and the Golden Ball at the end of the tournament) and Argentina had many injured players, Maradona being one of them. Maradona, a Napoli player, made comments pertaining to North–South inequality in the country and the risorgimento, asking Neapolitans to root for Argentina. Nevertheless, Argentina made its best performance in the World Cup and the match ended 1–1 after 90 minutes. With zero goals in extra time, the game went to a penalty shootout where Goycoechea was the hero again, stopping the shots from Aldo Serena and Roberto Donadoni to send Argentina to its second-straight World Cup final.

For the final in Rome, Argentina played West Germany, coached by former player Franz Beckenbauer. Caniggia, Olarticoechea & Batista were suspended for one game after receiving a yellow card each and Guisti for a red card in the match against Italy so they could not play the final. Germany arrived to the final as a wide favorite to take the Cup, as the squad had shown an effective and precise playing style, unlike Argentina which (with the exception of the game with Italy) had not had good previous performances. In addition, German footballers were in good condition while the Argentine players came to the final with several injuries, including Maradona. The game proved to be violent, brutal and bad tempered, particularly from the Argentines. Nevertheless, Germany only could score a goal at 83 minutes for a doubtful punishment by Mexican referee Edgardo Codesal, who awarded Germany a penalty kick for what he thought was a foul by Roberto Sensini against Rudi Völler. The call was controversial, and it was heavily debated by the Argentinian players. Andreas Brehme converted the penalty kick to give West Germany team its third World Cup title.

The 1986 champion side could not repeat the high performances made four years prior, most notably Maradona, who played all the tournament injured. Other players, including Ruggeri and Burruchaga, played in similar conditions due to injury.

The most notable player for Argentina was Sergio Goycochea, who is still remembered by his outstanding performance at the penalty shootouts.

=== The Basile era: 4 titles in 3 years ===
After the World Cup, Bilardo resigned, considering that his era had finished, as did Diego Maradona, announcing that the 1990 World Cup had been his last tournament.

Alfio Basile was announced as his replacement. The new coach started his tenure convinced that the new era would come up with youth players to the team, so he mostly called up footballers who were playing in the domestic league rather than footballers from international championships, at least for the first time.

Argentina debuted with Basile on the bench in February 1991, defeating Hungary 2–0 in Rosario. The national team played some friendly matches and tournaments such as the Stanley Rous Cup, where Argentina drew 2–2 with England at Wembley Stadium (after losing 0–2 after the first half). In March, Diego Maradona failed a drug test for cocaine in Italy, being suspended by 15 months.

==== 1991 Copa América ====
1991 was also the year when Argentina played its first official championship with Basile, the Copa América held in Chile. Argentina won its 13th Copa after 32 years, with a great performance on the field. The team debuted with a wide 3–0 to Venezuela, then defeating Chile 1–0 finishing the first stage with a 4–1 over Paraguay.

On the final round, the Albiceleste achieved a great 3–2 over Brazil, then drew 0–0 with Chile and defeated Colombia 2–1 in the final match, winning the Cup due to points average. Argentina won the tournament unbeaten, winning six of seven matches. Gabriel Batistuta was also the leading scorer of the Copa with six goals. Apart from Batistuta, Sergio Goycochea, Leonardo Astrada, Claudio Caniggia, Diego Simeone (who wore the number 10 kit shirt), Dario Franco, Leo Rodríguez were some of the most notable Argentine players.

==== 1992 FIFA Confederations Cup ====
In 1992, Argentina won the friendly tournament Kirin Cup (defeating Japan and Wales). Then, in October, the team won the King Fahd Cup, where they easily defeated Ivory Coast 4–0 in the semi-final and Saudi Arab 3–1 in the final game.

==== 1993 Artemio Franchi Trophy ====
On 24 February 1993, Maradona returned to the team when Argentina played the Artemio Franchi Trophy against Denmark in Mar del Plata. Argentina won 5–4 in a penalty shoot-out after a 1–1 draw.

==== 1993 Copa América ====
That same year, the national team also played the Copa América hosted by Ecuador, winning its second consecutive South American title. Maradona had returned to active football after being suspended due to the incident with drugs but Basile did not call him for the Cup, so Simeone wore the emblematic number 10 again.

Argentina only drew the matches against Mexico and Colombia (both 1–1) and defeated Bolivia 1–0 to pass to the next stage. Argentina first eliminated Brazil for the second-straight time, (6–5 via penalty shootout after a 1–1 draw), then Colombia the same way (6–5 p.s.), arriving to the final game against Mexico, which the national team won 2–1, with two goals from Batistuta. Argentina achieved its 14th title, winning only two matches in normal time, the rest either in extra time or penalties. This was the last Copa América Argentina had won until 2021, when they defeated Brazil 0–1.

Some of the players that took part in the squad were Goycochea, Ruggeri, Batistuta, Franco, Simeone, Fernando Redondo and Luis Islas.

==== A second "disaster" in 1993 ====
Immediately after the Copa América, Argentina had to play the qualifiers for the 1994 World Cup, held in the United States. The team shared group with Colombia, Paraguay and Peru. Argentina won the first two as visitor to Peru (1–0 in Lima) and Paraguay (3–1 in Asunción) but lost to Colombia 2–1 in Barranquilla. In Buenos Aires, Argentina defeated Peru 2–1, drew with Paraguay 0–0 and suffered a catastrophic loss to Colombia 5–0 on 5 September 1993 in the Estadio Monumental. It became the largest defeat to a national team since a 1–6 result in the 1958 World Cup. Colombia, with great players such as Carlos Valderrama, Freddy Rincón, Faustino Asprilla and Leonel Álvarez not only won the qualifiers unbeaten, but sent Argentina to play against the representative of Oceania to get a place for the World Cup.

The most important sports magazine of Argentina, El Gráfico, went into "mourning" with a completely black cover with the only legend: "Vergüenza" ("Shame") that expressed the deception and humiliation after the defeat.

Argentina had to play two knockout games against Australia to earn a place at the World Cup. Basile asked Maradona to return to the national squad so the team needed him to qualify to the Cup. Maradona agreed and he flew to Sydney with the rest of the team. Argentina played the first game on 31 October 1993 which ended 1–1. The second match was in Buenos Aires, where the national team won 1–0 (Batistuta) qualifying for the World Cup.

==== The trophy drought begins: 1994 FIFA World Cup ====
Argentina played several friendly matches as preparation for the World Cup. The team lost to Brazil 0–2 but beat Morocco 3–1 at Salta and smashed Israel 3–0 in Ramat Gan. Argentina debuted in the championship thrashing Greece 4–0 in Boston, with a hat-trick by Batistuta. Maradona also scored the third goal for Argentina, which would be his last goal in a World Cup. The national team played its second match against Nigeria again in Boston, which defeated by 2–1 (2 goals by Caniggia). At the end of the match, Argentina became a favorite to win the tournament, due to the attacking playing style showed by the squad (playing with four forwards), the number of goals scored and the good performances of some of its players such as Redondo, Caniggia, Batistuta, and even the aging Maradona, who looked in great shape and scored a gem of a goal.

At the end of the match against Nigeria, Maradona was called for the drug test, which gave positive results for ephedrine, a banned substance. The impact and repercussion of the news were immediate, and Maradona was expelled from the tournament and suspended for 15 months by FIFA.

With the team still hurt after losing its leader, Argentina was defeated by Bulgaria in the sweltering heat of Dallas for their last match of the first round. The team qualified to the knockout phase, where they were beaten by Romania 3–2 in Los Angeles; Basile decided not to include Caniggia in this match after he was benched during the 27th minute of the Bulgaria match. After the successes of 1986 and 1990, Argentina was eliminated in the second round. Although eliminated; in an ESPN interview with Quique Wolff, Maradona called the 1994 squad the greatest Argentina team of all time.

=== The Passarella era ===
==== 1995 King Fahd Cup ====
Argentina would again participate in the 1995 edition of the King Fahd Cup, the last under the name before it would be recognized as the FIFA Confederations Cup. During the group stage the team would win its first game against Japan 5–1 and have a goalless draw its second game against Nigeria. They would ultimately lose the final against Denmark 2–0.

==== 1998 World Cup ====
With Maradona officially retired, Argentina went into the tournament with high expectations, still fielding players from their previous tournament, with Gabriel Batistuta still a constant goalscoring threat and Diego Simeone remaining as the leading figure from the anchorman position. Drawn into Group H of the competition, their opponents consisted of Japan, Jamaica and Croatia. They began their campaign with a 1–0 victory over the Asian nation, following it up with a 5–0 demolition of the Caribbeans. Their third group game was against the Croatians, who had also confirmed qualification to the next round and ended with victory for the Albiceleste by 1–0.

Argentina went into the knockout phase with the impressive record of seven goals scored, keeping clean sheets in all three group games. Their opponent was England, fielding an equally strong team. Argentina took the lead with just six minutes played through Gabriel Batistuta from the penalty spot, only for Alan Shearer to equalize through the same means four minutes later. Six minutes after, youngster Michael Owen broke past Roberto Ayala to score a great individual effort, which was eventually cancelled out one minute into stoppage time after a free kick routine put Javier Zanetti through on goal to score, leaving the final result at 2–2 at the end of the first half.

In the second half, England playmaker David Beckham was sent off after a kick on Simeone, with the scores remaining unchanged until the end of normal time and extra time. Argentina won 4–3 on penalties, after Ayala scored the decisive spot kick to book their quarter-final spot, where the Netherlands awaited them.

The game was an equally fought match, with both sides scoring early goals; Patrick Kluivert netting after just 12 minutes and Claudio López equalizing five minutes later. Argentina held an advantage as the Dutch went a man down with the dismissal of Arthur Numan after his second booking for a foul on Simeone, though they were unable to take the opportunity and break the deadlock before they too went a man down; with Ariel Ortega receiving two successive yellow cards, the first one for diving inside the penalty box, with the second coming after headbutting Dutch goalkeeper Edwin van der Sar. Argentina's defence held tightly as extra-time beckoned, until a long aerial ball from Dutch captain Frank de Boer found Dennis Bergkamp, who maneuvered around Ayala and beat the Argentine goalkeeper Roa to send the Dutch through, eliminating Argentina from the competition.

=== The Bielsa era ===
==== 2002 World Cup ====
After a 1–0 win against Nigeria in the opening match, Argentina lost 1–0 to England and drew 1–1 with Sweden to finish third in Group F and to be eliminated from the group stage for the first time since 1962 which was their worst performance in their history.

==== 2004 Copa America ====
At the 2004 Copa America, Argentina started out well by thrashing Ecuador, 6–1. In the team's second game, however, they lost 1–0 to Mexico. The team rebounded in their last group stage by defeating Uruguay, 4–2. They finished second place in Group B and advanced to the quarterfinals, where they eliminated hosts Peru, 1–0. In the semifinals, they defeated Colombia, which had won the previous tournament, 3–0 to advance to the final. There, they faced rivals Brazil. With the teams drawing 1–1 late, Argentina went ahead in the 87th minute with a strike from Cesar Delgado, which looked like it would give Argentina its first Copa America title since 1993. However, they conceded a game-tying goal in stoppage time by Adriano, to send the game to penalties, where they lost 4–2.

=== The Pékerman era ===
==== 2005 Confederations Cup ====
Argentina were awarded a spot in the 2005 FIFA Confederations Cup because Brazil had won both the 2002 FIFA World Cup and the 2004 Copa América. Since both competitions award their winners a place in the Confederations Cup, the runners-up in the Copa América 2004 were called to play. During the group stage, Argentina would win its first two games: 2–1 against Tunisia and 4–2 against Australia. They would then draw 2–2 Germany in the last game of group stage, and would advance to knockout. They would draw Mesico in the semi-final of the knockout stage, where they would go to penalties after a 1–1 draw after extra time. They would advance after a 6–5 on penalties. Argentina would ultimately bow out to Brazil in the final after a 4–1 result.

==== 2006 World Cup ====
After Argentina had been eliminated at the group stage at Korea/Japan 2002 FIFA World Cup, although they had been among the pre-tournament favorites. There was a high expectation of a better performance in the 2006 World Cup in Germany. Argentina qualified for the knockout stages with wins over the Ivory Coast (2–1) and Serbia and Montenegro (6–0), and a 0–0 draw with the Netherlands.

In the round of 16, Argentina defeated Mexico 2–1 in extra-time, the winning goal scored by Maxi Rodríguez; this goal went on to win an online poll organized by FIFA as the best goal of the World Cup. In the quarter-final, they lost 4–2 in penalties against hosts Germany after a 1–1 draw. A brawl erupted between the Argentines and Germans after the game ended; unused substitute Leandro Cufré was sent off for kicking Per Mertesacker, while Maxi Rodríguez hit Bastian Schweinsteiger from behind. Following an investigation of video evidence, FIFA issued four-and two-game suspensions for Cufre and Rodríguez respectively. Germany's Torsten Frings was also suspended for the semi-final match for punching Julio Cruz.

Shortly after the elimination, coach José Pékerman resigned from his position. The AFA appointed Alfio Basile, who had previously managed the national side during the 1994 World Cup, as his successor.

=== Return of Basile ===
==== 2007 Copa América ====
Argentina won all three games in the group stage, beating the United States, Colombia and Paraguay. After convincing victories over Peru and Mexico in the quarter-final and semi-final, respectively, they were favorites to beat Brazil in the final, but were defeated 3–0.

During Sports Illustrated's 2009 all-decade awards and honors, the publication called Argentina the decade's biggest underachievers in the sport, citing their ongoing title drought and inability to win a trophy throughout the decade. It wrote: "the magnificently talented Albicelestes may have won World Cups in 1978 and '86, but this decade has been one long disaster...has one of the world's great soccer countries forgotten how to raise a trophy?"

=== The Maradona era ===
==== 2010 World Cup ====
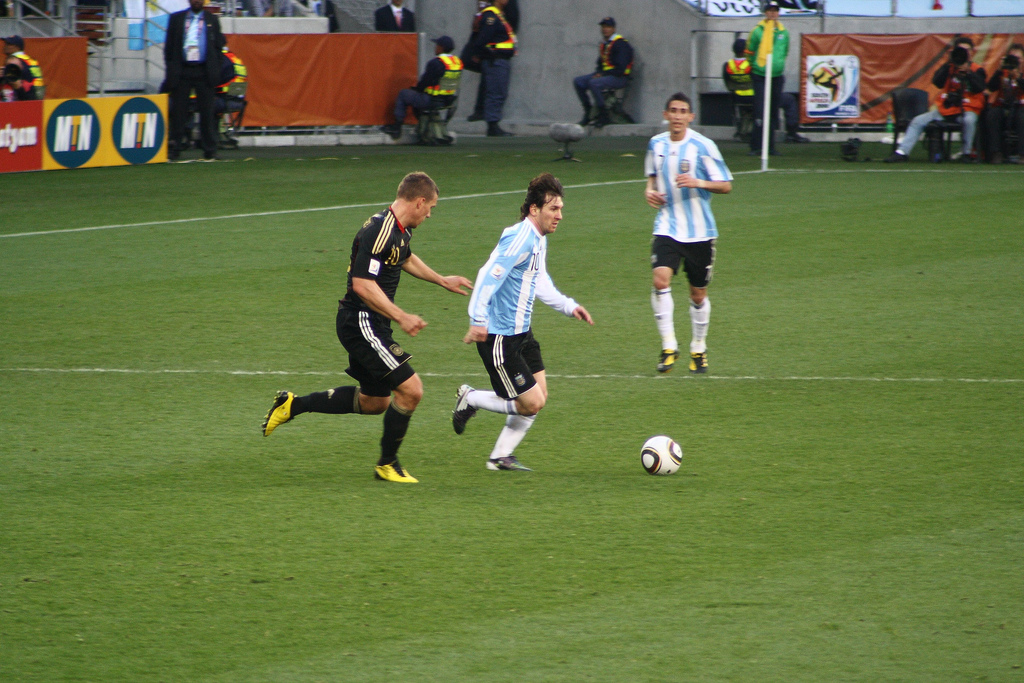
Lionel Messi carries out the ball, followed by Lukas Podolski in the quarter-finals of the 2010 World Cup.

Prior to the 2010 World Cup, Diego Maradona was appointed head coach. During the qualification process, he oversaw a 6–1 defeat to Bolivia in La Paz, Bolivia, and after a string of losses and draws, Argentina came dangerously close to failing to qualify, but victories in the last two matches secured qualification for the final tournament. In the final tournament itself, Argentina was placed in Group B, winning all their games. Their first game was against Nigeria, where Argentina netted a goal in the sixth minute to ensure a 1–0 victory. In the second match, against South Korea, a Gonzalo Higuaín hat-trick and a Korean own goal finished the score at 4–1. Argentina's last group game was against Greece, a 2–0 victory.

Argentina then advanced to the round of 16 to play Mexico. The game started with controversy when Carlos Tevez headed a ball from Lionel Messi for a goal; replay clearly showed that Tevez was in an offside position. Eventually, Argentina beat Mexico 3–1 to advance to the quarter-finals. In a much-hyped game, Argentina was shocked after Germany eliminated them with a 4–0 win. Thomas Müller opened the scoring in the third minute, with Miroslav Klose adding an additional two and Arne Friedrich one.

=== The Batista era ===
==== 2011 Copa América ====
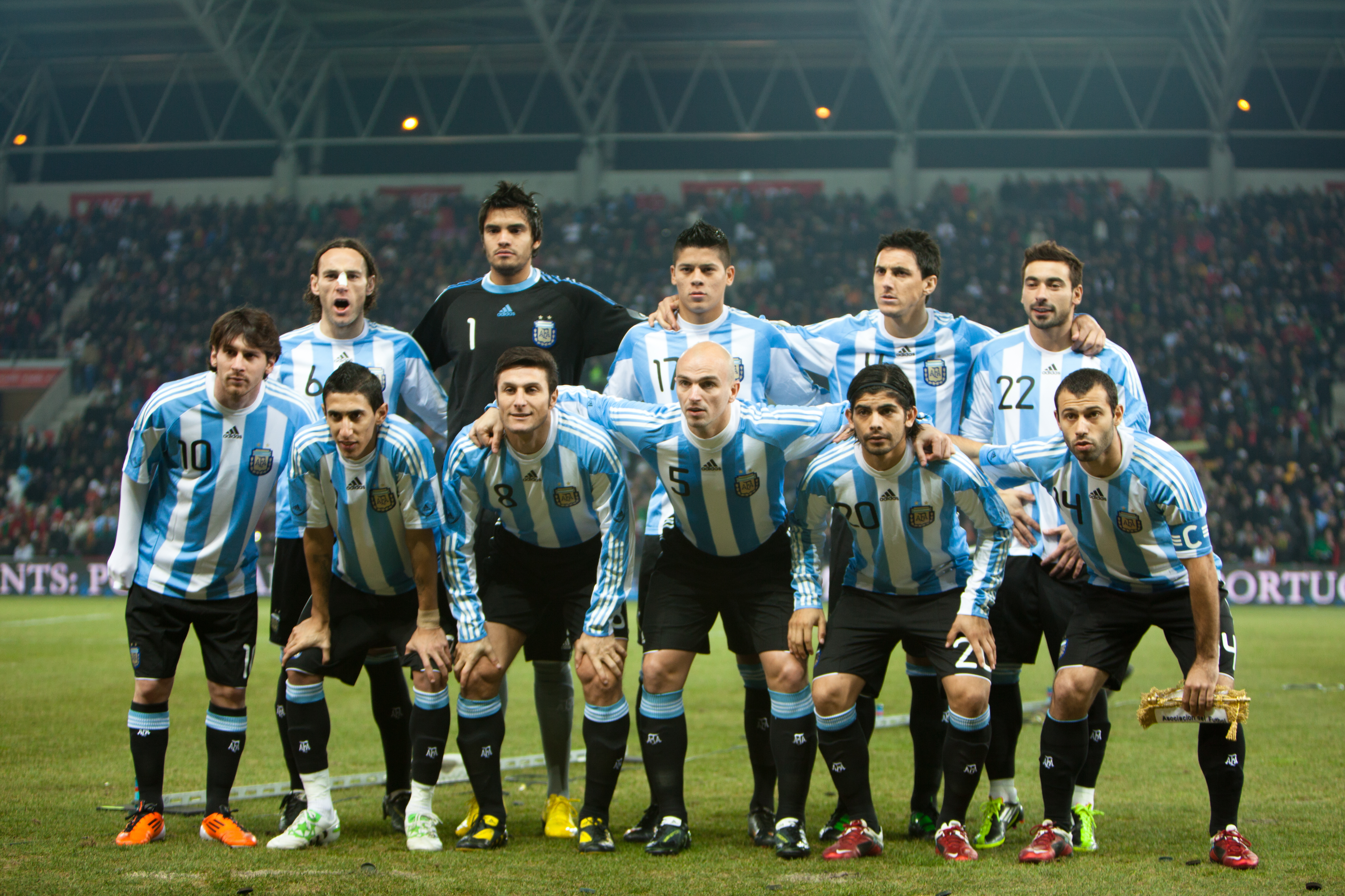
Argentina line-up at a friendly match vs. Portugal in Geneva, February 2011.

The 2011 Copa América was the first major tournament for new coach Sergio Batista. Argentina started the tournament with a shocking 1–1 tie against underdogs Bolivia. In their second game, they played a goalless draw against Colombia in Santa Fe, but went on to win their third game 3–0 against underdogs Costa Rica. Argentina was to play Uruguay in the quarter-finals. After going down after five minutes to a Diego Pérez goal, Gonzalo Higuaín equalized in the 17th minute. The score remained unchanged and after extra time, Argentina lost 5–4 in penalties with a miss from Carlos Tevez. After the elimination, Batista was sacked and replaced by former Estudiantes de La Plata coach Alejandro Sabella.

=== The Sabella era ===
==== 2014 World Cup ====
Argentina qualified for the 2014 World Cup and were drawn into Group F alongside Nigeria, Iran and debutants Bosnia and Herzegovina. Argentina had beaten all three of those teams, easily making it through to the next round. In the next round, they beat Switzerland 1–0 after a goalless 90 minutes. In the quarter-finals, they beat Belgium, also 1–0 through an early goal. They then beat the Netherlands 4–2 from a penalty shootout in São Paulo, but lost to eventual winners Germany in the final at the Maracanã Stadium in Rio de Janeiro, finishing their campaign as runners-up.

=== The Martino era ===
==== 2015 Copa América ====
Argentina entered the subsequent tournament, the 2015 Copa América as heavy favorites to take home the trophy. They began their group stage against Paraguay, where after leading 2–0 for most of the match ultimately settled for a 2–2 draw. Despite doubts in defence, they overcame the difficulties to beat fellow tournament favorites Uruguay and Jamaica. Their quarter-final opponent was Colombia, whose sturdy defense was impossible to break through and goalkeeper David Ospina making impressive saves to keep the game tied at 0–0. In penalties, Argentina missed several chances until Carlos Tevez, who was the sole player to miss his spot kick during the previous tournament, netted his attempt to send la Albiceleste through to the semi-finals to face Paraguay. The game was evenly played until half-time, when the score was 2–1 to Argentina, but four more goals during the second half allowed Argentina to cruise to the final, where they met host nation Chile.

The final was a hotly contested match, with both sides having great chances to open the scoring, particularly with a powerful shot from Sergio Agüero in the first half for Argentina, with Alexis Sánchez having a clear one for Chile in the second half. With the scores still tied at the end of regulation, the match went to penalties. Only captain Lionel Messi netted his penalty attempt, with Gonzalo Higuaín sending his attempt well over the crossbar and Éver Banega having his shot saved by Claudio Bravo to leave the final scoreline at 4–1 in penalties.

==== Copa América Centenario ====
Once more, Argentina entered the tournament as heavy favorites to take home the trophy after 22 years of international drought. La Albiceleste cruised through their group, with their opening match being a replay of the Copa América final from the year before against trophy holders Chile, which Argentina would go on to win 2–1. Further victories against Panama and Bolivia allowed them to top the group with the maximum number of points. Their quarter-final match was against surprise side Venezuela, where the match remained even for both sides before the Argentines won 4–1. They then dispatched hosts United States 4–0 to earn yet another final clash against Chile.

As previously, it was an even match, with Chile initially having the upper hand and more possession before going a man down, with Marcelo Díaz being dismissed after obstructing Messi on the ball. This, however, made it more difficult for Argentina to break through their defence, and they too would go a man down not long after with Marcos Rojo receiving a straight red card for a tackle on Arturo Vidal. Once again the match finished 0–0 and went to penalties. Although Sergio Romero saved Vidal's penalty kick, Messi shot his attempt over the crossbar, with the subsequent players netting their attempts until Bravo saved from Lucas Biglia and Francisco Silva netted the final penalty to once again hand Chile the trophy. The defeat caused frustration within the Argentine players, with Messi announcing his retirement from international football not long after, as well as many others suggesting their departure from the national team as well.

=== The Sampaoli era ===
==== 2018 FIFA World Cup qualifying and warm-up preparation friendlies ====
On 20 May 2017, the Argentine Football Association announced that Jorge Sampaoli would take over as the new national team manager, officially on 1 June 2017. Sampaoli's first game in charge was a friendly match against Brazil on 9 June in Australia, with Argentina winning 1–0. However, Argentina struggled during the qualifiers, and it took a Lionel Messi hat trick at Ecuador to confirm qualification for the 2018 FIFA World Cup.

On 27 March 2018, in a warm-up preparation friendly match, Argentina, without its captain Messi, who was sidelined for the match due to an injury, was routed 6-1 by 2010 FIFA World Cup champion Spain at the Wanda Metropolitano stadium in Madrid. It was Spain's biggest win over another previous World Cup champion, and Argentina's biggest loss since their 6–1 loss to Bolivia in 2009, and also tied the record for Argentina's biggest loss overall, by a margin of five goals.

==== 2018 FIFA World Cup ====
On 14 May 2018, Sampaoli announced a 35-man preliminary squad for the 2018 World Cup, and the final squad list was released on 21 May 2018.

When the World Cup in Russia came around, the tournament was a disaster for the Albiceleste. Argentina competed in Group D. Argentina drew 1–1 with Iceland during their opening World Cup group match, with one goal scored by Sergio Agüero, and the other one by Alfreð Finnbogason, an underwhelming performance that drew heavy criticism, especially towards Sampaoli. In the next group match, Argentina suffered a heavy 0–3 loss by Croatia due to "a defence left exposed, a midfield that was overrun and an attack that was blunted", which put them on the brink of elimination and led to unconfirmed reports that Sampaoli would be sacked. The match against Croatia was Sampaoli's 13th game in charge, where he had used 13 lineups and a total of 59 players, and despite a myriad of attacking choices the defence was poor. Sampaoli remained in his position, as Argentina defeated Nigeria 2–1 in the third group match thanks to an 88th minute go-ahead goal to advance to the knockout stage. In the round of 16, Argentina lost to France 4–3, despite an initial 2–1 lead as they conceded three successive goals, and was eliminated from the tournament.

=== The Scaloni era: a new golden age for Argentina ===
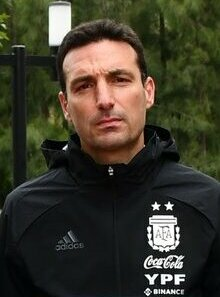
Lionel Scaloni was the Argentina manager who won the 2022 World Cup. He also won the 2021 Copa América, the 2024 Copa America and the 2022 Finalissima with the team.

On 15 July 2018, the Argentine Football Association announced that Sampaoli had left his position as national coach by mutual consent. In October 2018, after an interim, Lionel Scaloni, a previous assistant of Jorge Sampaoli, took the national team. He didn´t have any experience coaching any adult team, so he was criticized by a big part of the Argentine´s sport media.

==== 2019 Copa América ====
Argentina lost to Colombia in the 1st group stage game, then tied to Paraguay, then won against Qatar, before advancing to the Quarterfinals vs Venezuela where they won 0–2, then the semi-finals they lost 2–0, so 3rd place, Argentina won over Chile 2-1 while Messi and Medel both getting red cards. Because of the result, the public's opinion on the team's coach improved.

Because of this sudden change in the fans' support and "going up" at the project, they were nicknamed "La Scaloneta" (The Scaloneta), in a combination of Scaloni's surname and the Spanish word for van (camioneta).

==== End of the drought: 2021 Copa América & 2022 Finalissima titles ====
At the 2021 Copa América, Argentina finished top of Group A with 3 wins and 1 draw. They defeated Ecuador and Colombia in the quarter-finals and semi-finals respectively to advance to the final. Argentina won their 15th Copa América title with a 1–0 victory against Brazil at Maracanã Stadium in Rio de Janeiro, ending their 28-year title drought and giving them their first trophy since 1993. Argentina would continue their undefeated winning streak including winning the 2022 Finalissima game against Italy to win their second championship in history.

==== 2022 World Cup glory ====
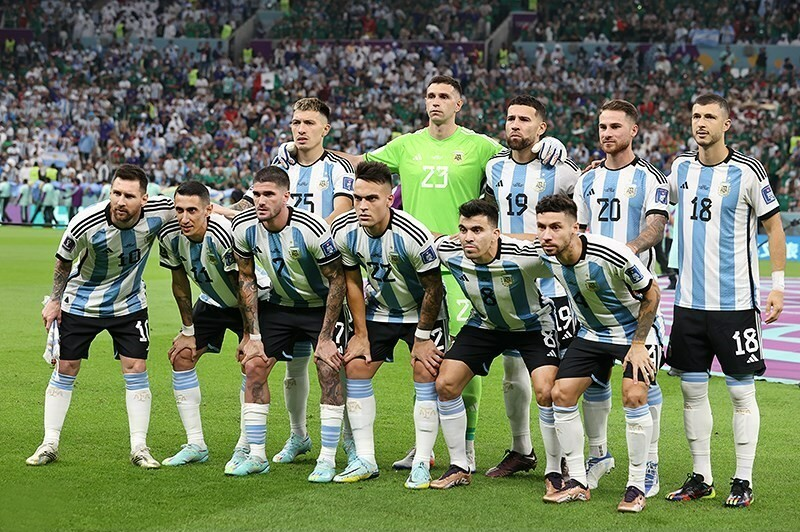
Argentina line-up against Mexico at the 2022 FIFA World Cup.

After a shocking 2–1 defeat against Saudi Arabia in the opening match, Argentina managed to top Group C, after beating the Mexico and Poland national football teams (2–0 in both matches) to advance to the knockout stages. In the round of 16, Argentina defeated Australia 2–1, then they defeated the Netherlands 4–3 on penalties after a 2–2 draw in the quarter-final, and they secured a 3–0 victory over Croatia in the semi-final.

In the final on 18 December, Argentina faced the defending World Cup champions France. Messi scored the opening goal of the match, and began the counter-attack that led to Ángel Di María scoring Argentina's second goal. It went to extra time after Kylian Mbappé scored two goals, where Messi restored Argentina's lead, only for Mbappé to score a hat trick to send the match to a penalty shoot-out. Messi scored the first penalty for his team, while the goalkeeper Emiliano Martinez saved Kingsley Coman's penalty attempt. Gonzalo Montiel's penalty secured Argentina's 4–2 victory, giving them their first World Cup title since 1986. It has been regarded by fans and commentators as one of the greatest football matches of all time, as well as one of the greatest World Cup finals in history.

Messi was awarded the Golden Ball as best player of the tournament, while also being the World Cup's second top scorer (7 goals) after Mbappé. Likewise, Emiliano Martínez was awarded the Golden Glove as the best goalkeeper of the tournament, and Enzo Fernández was awarded the best young player award.

==== 2024 Copa América ====
Argentina entered the 2024 Copa América as defending champions. They would win 2–0 win over Canada in the opening game. It would be his 35th Copa América match, which broke the tournament record. A 1–0 victory in the next match against Chile on 25 June ensured they would top their group and advance to the knockout stage.

On 4 July, in the quarter-finals against Ecuador, following a 1–1 draw after 90 minutes, the game went to penalties. Argentina advanced following a 4–2 victory in the shootout. On 14 July, during the final the final against Colombia, Messi was substituted in the 66th minute after suffering a severe ankle injury, later revealed to be on his right ankle's ligament, but Argentina eventually won in extra time courtesy of a Lautaro Martínez strike. Argentina would lift the trophy, their fourth in three years, and Martínez won the Golden Boot for the tournament with 5 goals.

==== 2026 FIFA World Cup ====
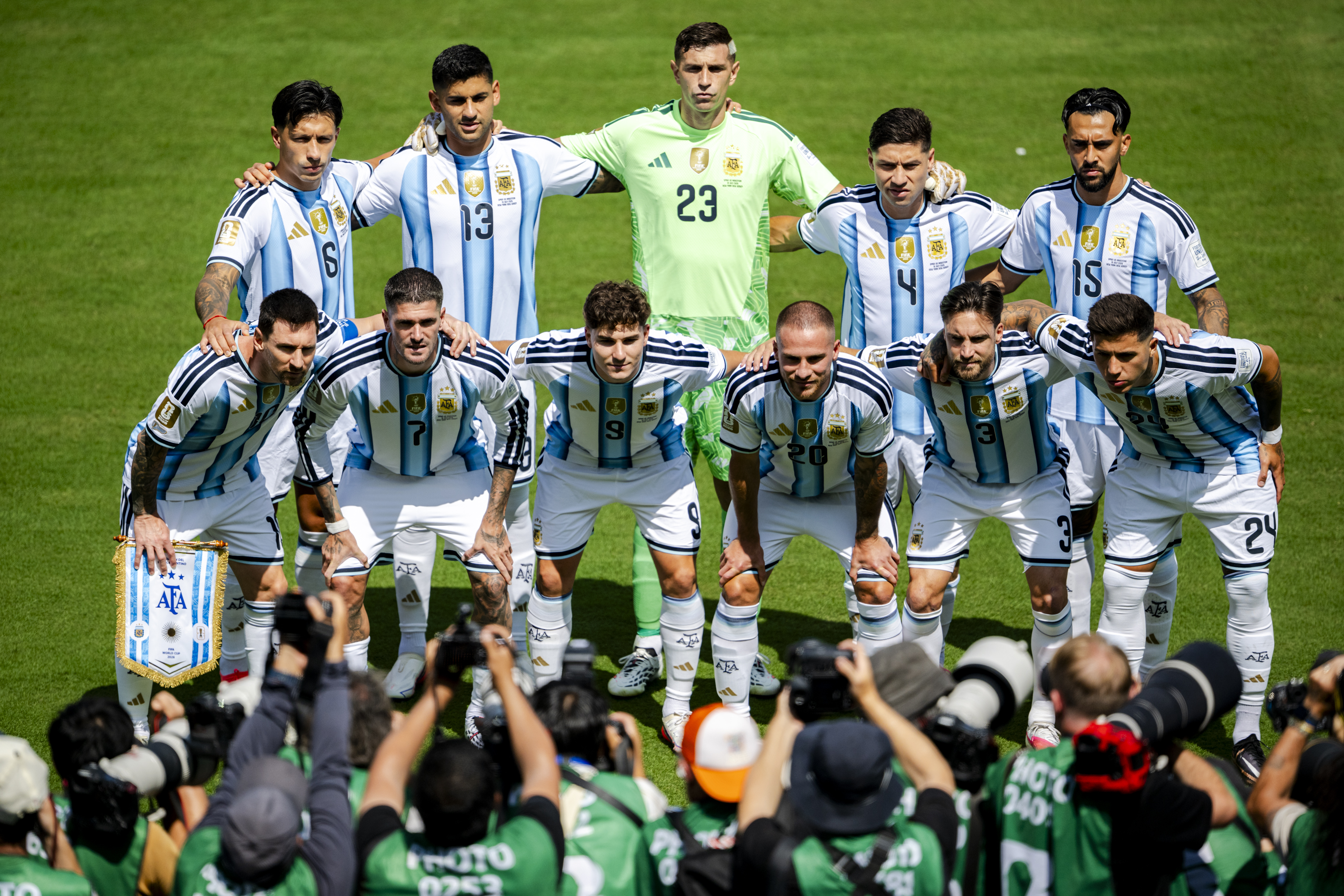
Argentina's starting lineup during the final

The 2026 edition of that tournament saw the team enter as the defending world champions, with the Albiceleste starting off by defeating Algeria, 3-0, in Kansas City, Missouri, as well as Austria, 2-0, and then Jordan, 3-1, both in Arlington, Texas, in the group stage, before starting the knockout round by defeating Cape Verde, 3-2 (following extra time), in Miami Gardens, Florida, in an encounter almost immediately billed as one of the most "epic" World Cup games ever played; the next game for the team would witness it fall behind, 2-0, against Egypt, before surging late to win, 3-2, in Atlanta, Georgia, then defeating Switzerland, 3-1 (extra time), back in Kansas City, and engineering another late comeback win in the semifinal against England, 2-1, also in Atlanta, reaching its second consecutive World Cup Final, this time, against Spain, the defending champions of Europe, with that game being played in East Rutherford, New Jersey; Spain would win that game, 1-0, after extra time, for its second title ever in the World Cup (after the one in 2010), and denying La Albiceleste its second consecutive title. Lionel Messi, the national team's star forward for two full decades by that point in time, scored eight total goals during that particular edition, entering the final, breaking the tournament record for goals set by Germany's Miroslav Klose (16), set between 2002 and 2014, and was widely credited in the sports media with "sealing" its aforementioned 2-1 win over England in the semifinal to reach its second consecutive such tournament final.

== Bibliography ==
- "Historial de la Selección Argentina 1901-1985", Sólo Fútbol Anuario 1985, Editorial Sineret, Buenos Aires (1985)
- Historia de la Selección Argentina 1901-1991
- Argentina national team 1901-2008 at RSSSF
- Argentina: Other matches 1901-2008 at RSSSF
- Selección Nacional: Historia at AFA website
- Biblioteca del Fútbol Argentino
- Copa América 1916-2007 at RSSSF
