= Liceo Francisco Bauzá =

Coordinates: 34.8634°S 56.2078°W

Francisco Bauzá Lyceum
- Liceo Francisco Bauzá
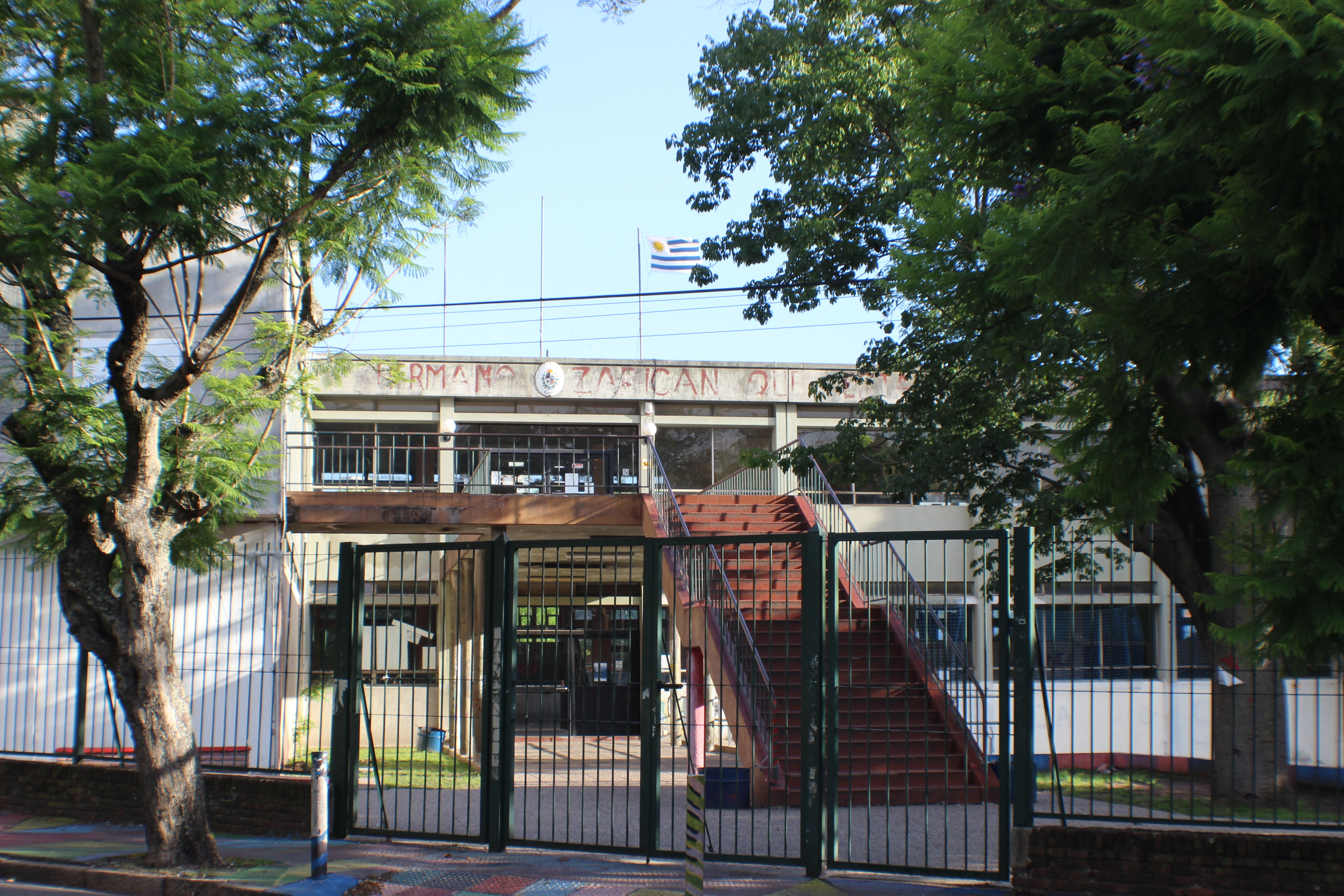

Location
- 896 Lucas Obes St. Paso del Molino, Montevideo; Uruguay

Information
- Other name: Liceo No. 35 de Montevideo
- Type: Public secondary
- Established: 1936
- Headmistress: Jacqueline Nielli Motta
- Gender: Coeducational
- Website: Liceo Francisco Bauzá

Liceo Francisco Bauzá is a public secondary school in Montevideo, Uruguay. Officially designated Liceo N.º 6 of Montevideo, it is located in the Paso del Molino neighborhood and provides upper secondary education, serving students in the second and third years of Educación Media Superior, corresponding to the final two years of secondary education (grades 11 and 12). It is among the largest high schools in Uruguay by student enrollment.

== History ==
The school was established in 1936 and initially operated in the same building as Liceo Héctor Miranda. In 1937, it relocated to a property on Agraciada Avenue, on the boundary between the Paso del Molino and Prado neighborhoods. That same year, it was officially named Francisco Bauzá by law, in honor of the Uruguayan writer, educator, and politician.

== Notable alumni ==
- Fernanda Auersperg – accountant and politician
- Alejandro Sánchez Pereira – politician
