= 1902 Uruguay v Argentina football match =

First international football match in South America
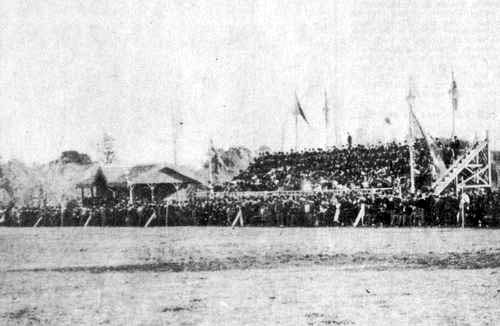
- Albion F.C. Stadium, venue
- Event: Friendly
Uruguay	Argentina
(Uruguay)	(Argentina)
0	6
- Date: 20 July 1902
- Venue: Albion F.C. Stadium, Paso del Molino, Uruguay
- Referee: Roberto W. Ruud (Argentina)
- Attendance: 8,000

Uruguay 0–6 Argentina was an association football match between Uruguay and Argentina in 1902. It was the first international match for both sides, and also the first international held in South America. Argentina won 6–0, initiating a longtime rivalry between both teams, that have met more than 190 times since that first encounter, becoming the international derby with the most matches played worldwide, surpassing even the England–Scotland rivalry, which, first held in 1872, is the oldest fixture in the world.

== Overview ==
One year before, there had been a precedent when representatives from both sides met in a match also in Montevideo, although it was not organised by any association and therefore is not considered official. Moreover, the match was organised by local club Albion in its home field located in Paso del Molino, Montevideo. The Uruguayan side had nine players from that club and the remainder from Nacional. Argentina won the match by 3–2.

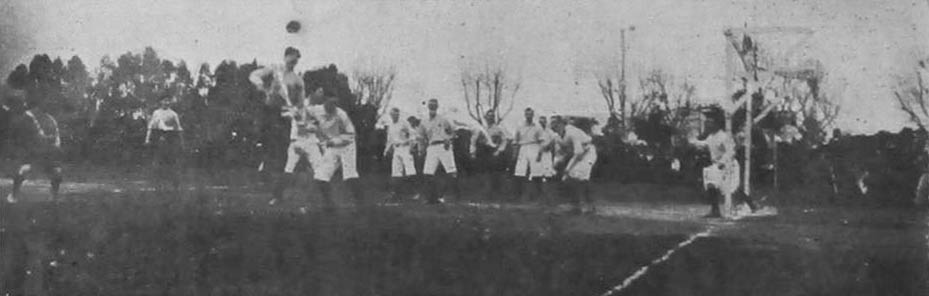
A moment of the match: Bolívar Céspedes heading the ball

In 1902, both associations, AUF and AFA, agreed to play a match in the same venue. President of AFA, Francis Hepburn Chevallier-Boutell and Lomas A.C. player Juan O. Anderson selected the players for the match. Chevallier-Boutell also chose the uniforms, so Uruguay played in a blue shirt with a white diagonal sash while Argentine wore light blue shirts. Argentina easily beat Uruguay 6–0, with Carlos Dickinson making history after scoring the first goal of the match. Uruguay starting line-up included eight players from Nacional and three from Albion, while Argentina team was formed by players from Alumni (5), Quilmes (2), Belgrano A.C. (2), Lomas (1), and Barracas A.C. (1).

During a long lapse of time, Argentina and Uruguay played each other exclusively so no other national teams had been formed in South America. 8,000 spectators attended the match. Both sides played thirteen consecutive times between 1902 and 1909, giving birth to a strong rivalry that remained through the years. Some competitions contested by Argentina and Uruguay were soon created, such as Copa Lipton (first held in 1905), and Copa Newton (started in 1906).

== Match details ==
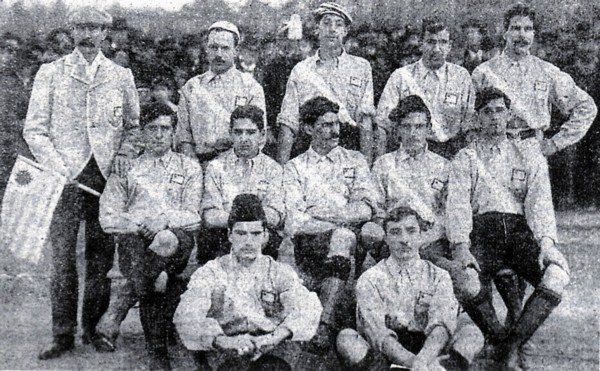
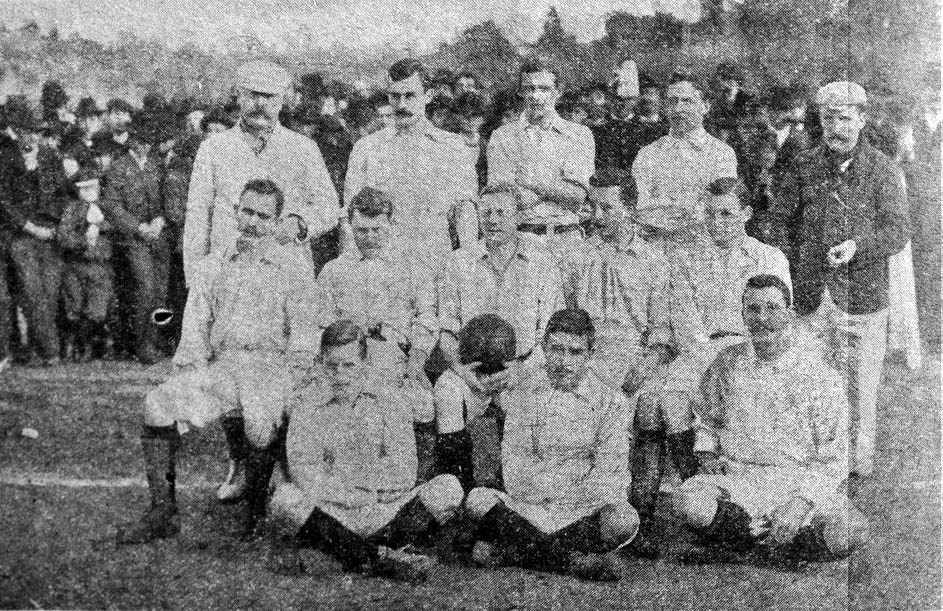
Uruguay (left) and Argentine teams before playing their first international
20 July 1902
14:35

Uruguay	0–6	Argentina
	Report	Dickinson 3'; Arímalo 31' (o.g.); Morgan 64'; Urioste 66' (o.g.); Anderson 71'; J. Brown 86'

Albion FC Field, Paso del Molino
Attendance: 8,000
Referee: Roberto W. Ruud (Argentina)

Uruguay
Argentina

GK	Enrique Sardeson
DF	Carlos Carve Urioste
DF	Germán Arímalo
MF	Miguel Nebel (c)
MF	Alberto Peixoto
MF	Luis Carbone
FW	Bolívar Céspedes
FW	Gonzalo Rincón
FW	Juan Sardeson
FW	Ernesto Boutón Reyes
FW	Carlos Céspedes

GK	José Buruca Laforia
DF	William Leslie
DF	Walter Buchanan
MF	Eduardo Patricio Duggan
MF	Carlos J. Buchanan
MF	Ernesto Brown
FW	Edward O. Morgan
FW	Juan José Moore (c)
FW	Juan O. Anderson
FW	Carlos Edgar Dickinson
FW	Jorge Brown

== See also ==
- Argentina–Uruguay football rivalry
- History of the Argentina national football team
- 1872 Scotland v England football match
