= Liceo Instituto Batlle y Ordóñez =

Coordinates: 34.8497°S 56.2021°W

Liceo Instituto José Batlle y Ordóñez
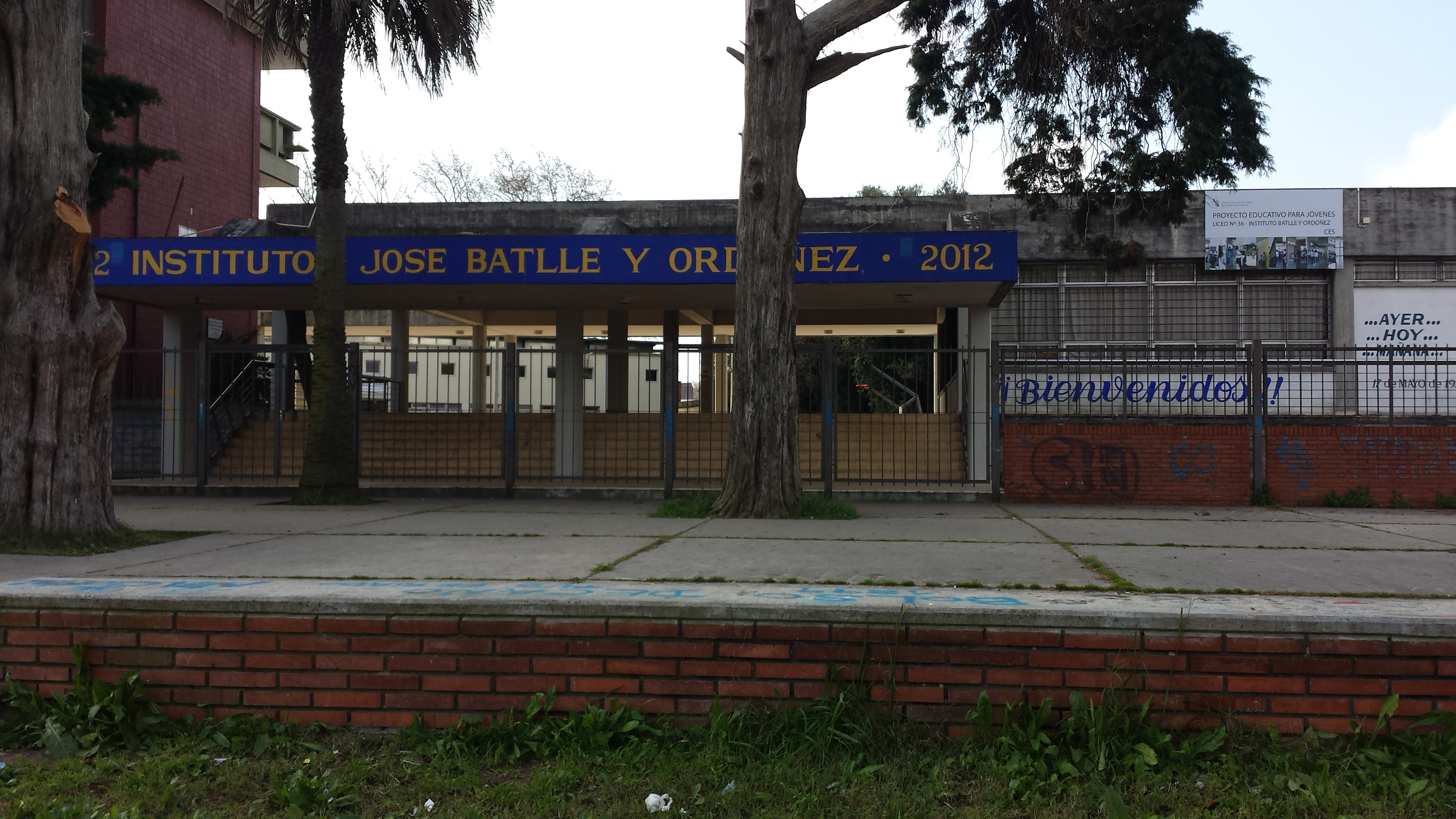

Location
- 711 Camino Castro; Paso de las Duranas, Montevideo; Uruguay

Information
- Other name: Liceo No. 36 de Montevideo
- Type: Public secondary
- Established: 1940
- Gender: Coeducational
- Nickname: IBO

Liceo Instituto Batlle y Ordóñez is a public secondary school in Montevideo, Uruguay. Located in the Paso de las Duranas neighborhood, it is officially designated Liceo N.º 36 of Montevideo. It is named after José Batlle y Ordóñez, President of Uruguay in the early 20th century and a leading figure behind major social and economic reforms.

== History ==
The origins of the institution date back to 17 May 1912, with the establishment of the Female Secondary Education Section of the University of the Republic, at a time when secondary education in Uruguay was administered by the university. Commonly known as the Universidad de Mujeres (Spanish for 'Women’s University'), the institution provided both lower and upper secondary education exclusively for women.

In 1939, a purpose-built facility designed by architect Octavio de los Campos was inaugurated on the then Diagonal Agraciada—now Libertador Avenue—in the Aguada neighborhood, to serve as the headquarters of the institution. In December 1944, it was officially renamed Instituto Batlle y Ordóñez, in honor of former President José Batlle y Ordóñez, a key promoter of the legislation that led to its creation.

Enrollment grew steadily over the decades. While the institution initially admitted 66 students, by 1962 it had 2,035 students enrolled in the secondary section and a further 982 in the preparatory courses. However, in 1979, the female section was dissolved. The building formerly occupied by the institution was later used by several teacher-training institutions, before ultimately becoming the headquarters of the Instituto de Profesores Artigas. Following the democratic transition, the Liceo Instituto Batlle y Ordóñez was relocated to a new campus in the Paso de las Duranas neighborhood of Montevideo, where it was reorganized as a coeducational public secondary school and operates under the authority of the National Administration of Public Education.

== Notable alumni ==
- Alejandro Sánchez Pereira – politician
