= James Oswald Anderson =

Argentine association football player

Personal information
- Born: 18 March 1872 Buenos Aires, Argentina
- Died: 21 July 1932 (aged 60) Reading, Berkshire, England
Association football career
- Position: Striker
Senior career*
Years	Team	Apps	(Gls)
1895–1902	Lomas	37	(31)
International career
1902	Argentina	1	(1)
- * Club domestic league appearances and goals

Sport
- Cricket career

Cricket information

Domestic team information
- Years: Team
- 1906–1912: Hertfordshire

Career statistics
Competition	Minor Counties
Matches	27
Runs scored	754
Batting average	19.33
100s/50s	1/2
Top score	101
Catches/stumpings	18/–
- Source: CricketArchive, 17 June 2022

James Oswald Anderson (18 March 1872 – 21 July 1932), also known as Juan O. Anderson, was an Argentine sportsman. He played football for Lomas between 1895 and 1902, and participated in Argentina's first official match against Uruguay in 1902, where he scored one of six goals for his team. Additionally, he was President of the River Plate Rugby Union between 1904 and 1905, and later played cricket for Hertfordshire between 1906 and 1912.

== Life ==
James Oswald Anderson was born into a British family in Buenos Aires on 18 March 1872 and educated in England at Bedford Modern School where he was in the First XI and the First XV.

Anderson played football as a striker for Lomas between 1895 and 1902, scoring 31 goals in 37 appearances. He was the top goal scorer in the 1896 season. He helped organise and participated in Argentina's first official match against Uruguay in 1902 where he scored a goal for his country in its 6–0 victory. The previous year, he was behind the first football match in South America against the same opposition, losing 3–2 in Montevideo. However, this match is not recognised as part of Argentina's history, as the Argentina line-up was known as the "J. O. Anderson XI Team". In 1893, he co-founded the Argentine Association Football League (AAFL), the precursor to the Argentine Football Association (AFA). He served as secretary, and later as vice-president of the AAFL.

James Oswald Anderson was also a pioneer in cricket, a sport he practiced from a very young age.

Anderson encouraged the development of all sport in Argentina, and founded the River Plate Rugby Union in 1889, which would go on to become the Argentine Rugby Union. He was the President of the governing body between 1904 and 1905. He moved to England to play cricket for Hertfordshire between 1906 and 1912.

Anderson died in Reading, Berkshire on 21 July 1932.
