= Fernanda Auersperg =

Uruguayan politician (born 1971)

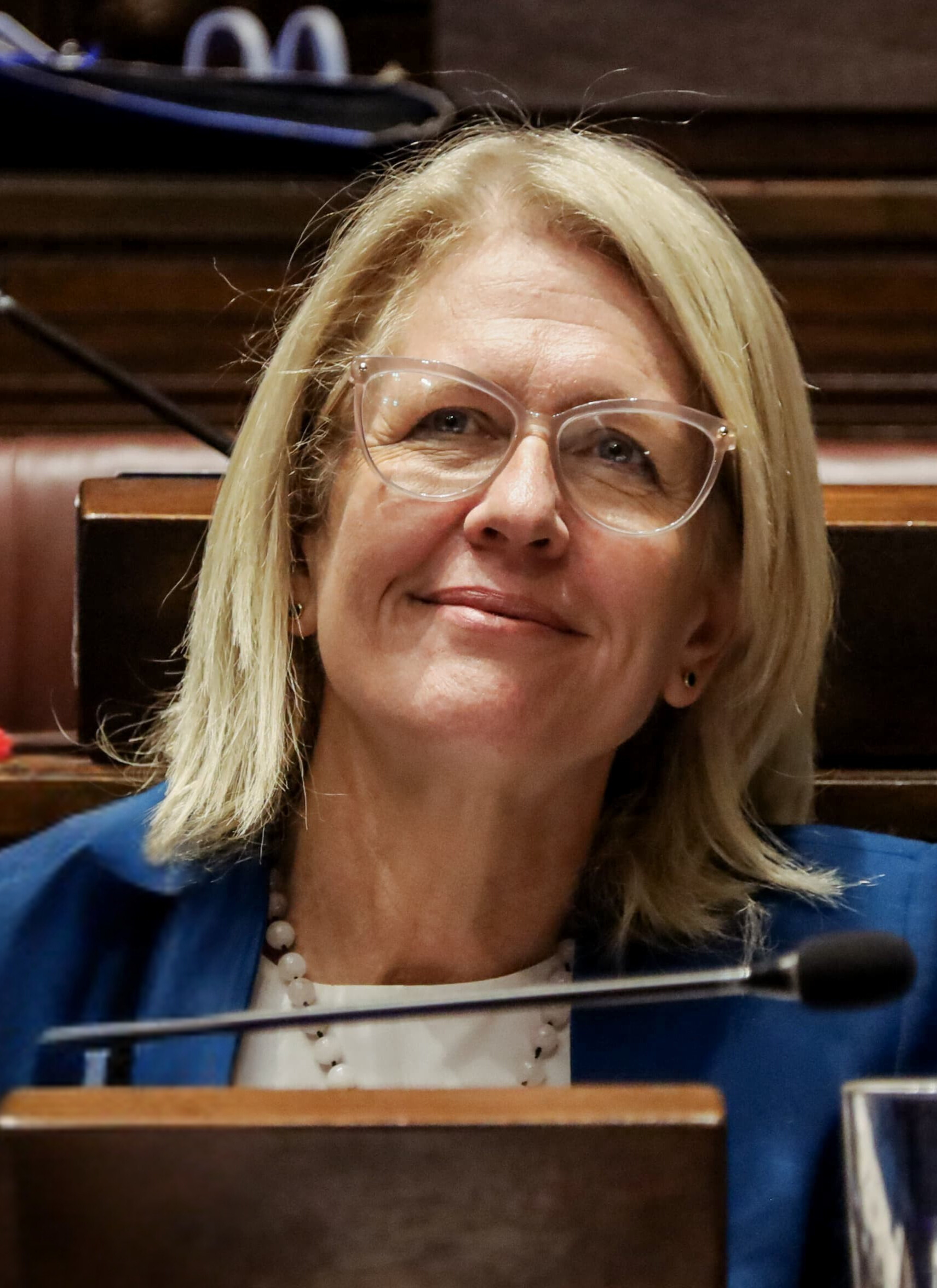
- Auersperg in 2025

National Representative
- Incumbent
- Assumed office February 15, 2025
- Constituency: Montevideo

Personal details
- Born: August 7, 1971 (age 54) Montevideo, Uruguay
- Party: National
- Spouse: Rafael Tomé (m. 2001)
- Children: 3
- Education: University of the Republic
- Occupation: Accountant; politician

María Fernanda Auersperg Kosenkov (born August 7, 1971) is a Uruguayan accountant and politician who has served as a National Representative since 2025. A member of the National Party, she served as Director of Social Protection at the Ministry of Social Development from 2020 to 2025.

== Early life and education ==
Auersperg Kosenkov was born in Montevideo, on August 7, 1971, the daughter of Fernando Gobertus Auersperg and Marta Kosenkov. She is of Austrian descent and a descendant of the House of Auersperg. She attended Colegio San Francisco de Asís and completed her upper secondary education at Liceo Francisco Bauzá.

She graduated from the University of the Republic with a degree in accounting in 1996, and later completed a management development program at the University of Montevideo in 2001, as well as a leadership course on social impact projects offered by the Inter-American Development Bank in 2020.

== Career ==
From 1993 to 1997, she worked as a senior auditor in the Audit Department of PricewaterhouseCoopers. After graduating, she served as Manager of the Insurance Division at the Uruguayan branch of the Spanish multinational Banco Santander from May 1997 to July 2003. Later, from 2004 to 2016, she held the position of General Manager of Deutsche Bank’s Uruguayan subsidiary, where she oversaw the bank’s operations in the country.

== Political career ==
Auersperg joined the National Party in 2017, becoming a member of Espacio 40, a faction led by Javier García Duchini.

In 2020, she was appointed National Director of Social Protection at the Ministry of Social Development during the administration of President Luis Lacalle Pou. During her tenure, the department oversaw the implementation of various social programs and the establishment of new care centers, including the Community Mental Health Reference Center inaugurated in 2024.

In the 2024 general election, she ran for the Chamber of Representatives and was elected for the 50th Legislature. She took office on February 15, three days after resigning from her position at the Ministry of Social Development.
