= Alejandro Sánchez Pereira =

Uruguayan politician (born 1980)

Alejandro Sánchez
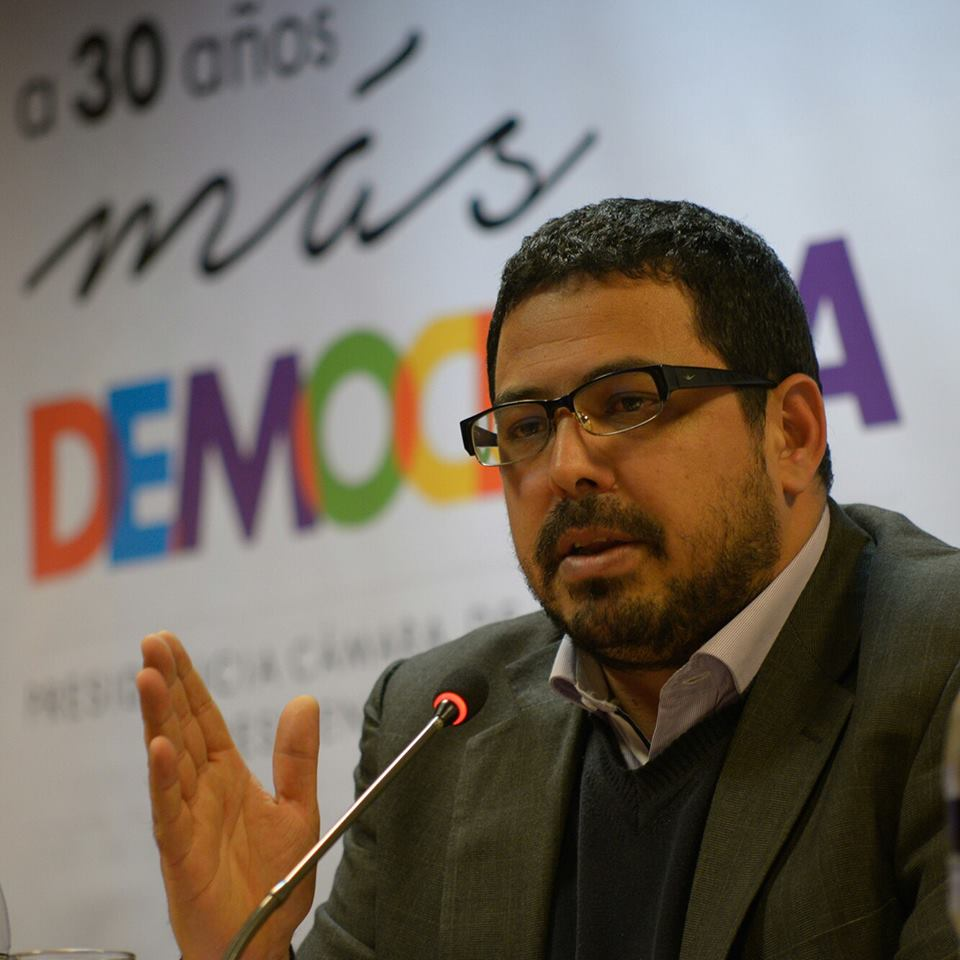
- Official portrait, 2019

Secretary of the Presidency
- Incumbent
- Assumed office 1 March 2025
- President: Yamandú Orsi
- Preceded by: Rodrigo Ferrés

Senator of the Republic
- In office October 20, 2020 – 1 March 2025
- Preceded by: José Mujica

National Representative
- In office February 15, 2010 – October 14, 2020
- Constituency: Montevideo

Personal details
- Born: Alejandro Sánchez Pereira; April 24, 1980 (age 45) Montevideo, Uruguay
- Party: Broad Front
- Children: 2

Alejandro Sánchez Pereira, better known by his nickname Pacha (born 24 April 1980) is a Uruguayan politician, serving as the 20th Secretary of the Presidency since 2025. A member of the Movement of Popular Participation – Broad Front, he served as a Senator of the Republic from 2020 to 2025 and as a National Representative from 2010 to 2020.

== Early life ==
Sánchez was born in Montevideo in 1980, the son of two farmers' market vendors and supporters of the Broad Front. He has a younger brother, Daniel. Raised in Peñarol–Lavalleja, he attended public schools in his neighborhood. He attended Liceo Instituto Batlle y Ordóñez and Liceo Francisco Bauzá, and enrolled at the University of the Republic to study sociology, but did not graduate.

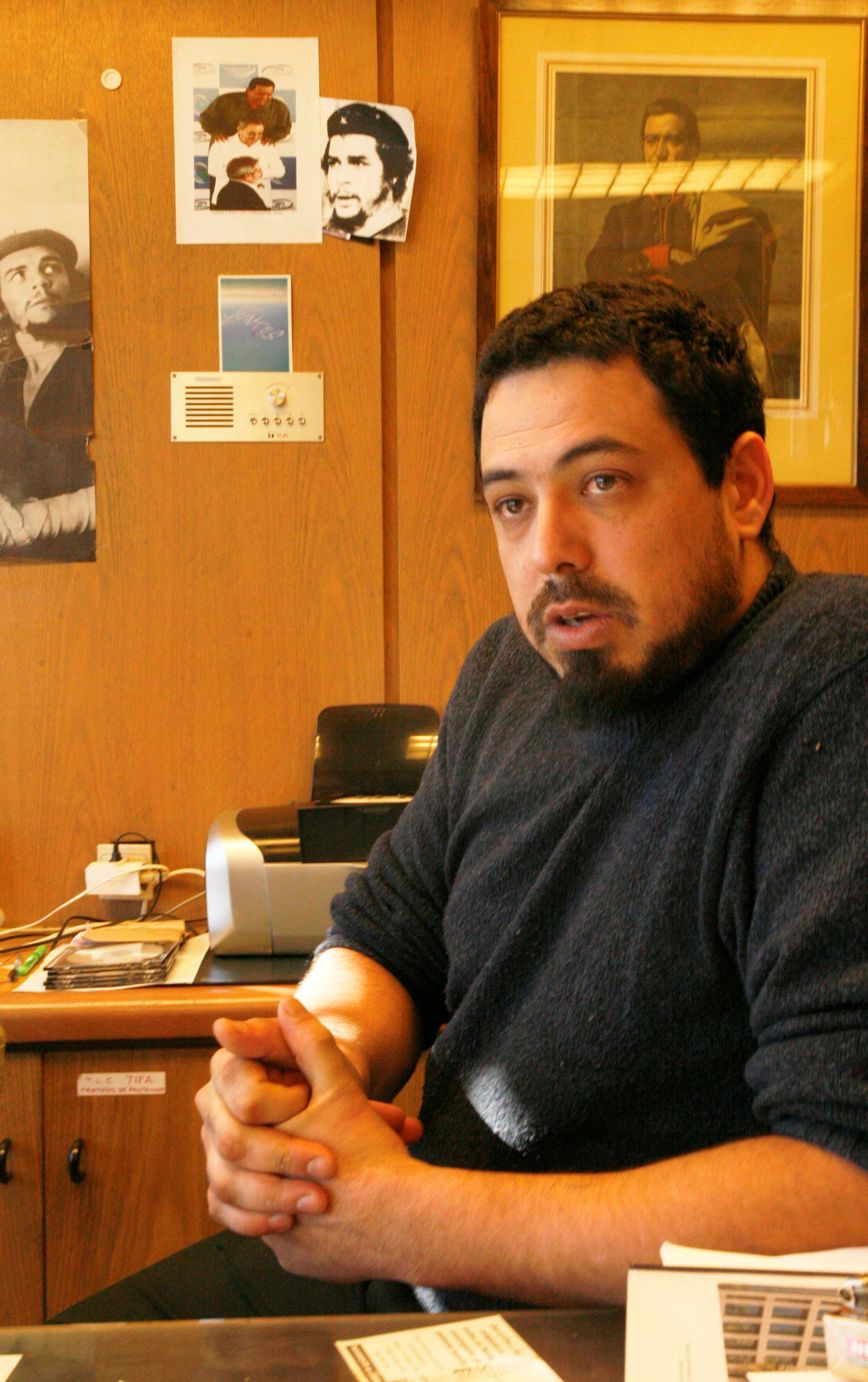
Alejandro Sánchez Pereira in his office in 2010.
