= 1995 King Fahd Cup Group B =

Group B of the 1995 King Fahd Cup took place between 6 and 10 January 1995. Argentina won the group on goal difference, and advanced to the final, while Nigeria finished second and advanced to third-place playoff. Japan failed to advance.

== Standings ==
Team	Pld	W	D	L	GF	GA	GD	Pts
Argentina	2	1	1	0	5	1	+4	4
Nigeria	2	1	1	0	3	0	+3	4
Japan	2	0	0	2	1	8	−7	0

== Results ==
=== Japan v Nigeria ===
6 January 1995
01:00 AST

Japan	0–3	Nigeria
	Report	Amunike 4'; Adepoju 55'; Amokachi 65'

King Fahd II Stadium, Riyadh
Attendance: 25,000
Referee: Ion Crăciunescu (Romania)

Japan	Nigeria

JAPAN:
GK	1	Shigetatsu Matsunaga
DF	2	Yoshihiro Natsuka
DF	3	Satoshi Tsunami	Booked
DF	4	Masami Ihara
DF	7	Takumi Horiike
MF	5	Tetsuji Hashiratani
MF	8	Tsuyoshi Kitazawa		(substituted off) 73'
MF	10	Ruy Ramos		(substituted off) 46'
MF	15	Motohiro Yamaguchi
FW	9	Toshihiro Yamaguchi	Booked
FW	11	Kazuyoshi Miura
Substitutions:
MF	14	Hiromitsu Isogai		(substituted in) 46'
FW	16	Masahiro Fukuda		(substituted in) 73'
Manager:
Shu Kamo

NIGERIA:
GK	1	Peter Rufai
DF	2	Augustine Eguavoen
DF	3	Benedict Iroha
DF	5	Uche Okechukwu
DF	20	Uche Okafor
MF	8	Mutiu Adepoju
MF	11	Emmanuel Amunike
MF	13	Sunday Oliseh
FW	12	Samson Siasia		(substituted off) 83'
FW	14	Daniel Amokachi
FW	18	Efan Ekoku		(substituted off) 62'
Substitutions:
MF	10	Jay-Jay Okocha	Booked	(substituted in) 62'
MF	6	Momodu Mutairu		(substituted in) 83'
Manager:
Shuaibu Amodu

=== Japan v Argentina ===
8 January 1995
20:00 AST

Japan	1–5	Argentina
Miura 57'	Report	Rambert 31'; Ortega 45'; Batistuta 47', 86'; Chamot 54'

King Fahd II Stadium, Riyadh
Attendance: 10,000
Referee: Rodrigo Badilla (Costa Rica)

Japan	Argentina

JAPAN:
GK	1	Shigetatsu Matsunaga
DF	2	Yoshihiro Natsuka
DF	3	Satoshi Tsunami	(yellow card) 10'
DF	4	Masami Ihara
DF	7	Takumi Horiike		(substituted off) 62'
MF	5	Tetsuji Hashiratani
MF	9	Toshihiro Yamaguchi		(substituted off) 51'
MF	14	Hiromitsu Isogai
MF	15	Motohiro Yamaguchi
FW	11	Kazuyoshi Miura
FW	16	Masahiro Fukuda
Substitutions:
MF	8	Tsuyoshi Kitazawa		(substituted in) 51'
DF	18	Hiroshige Yanagimoto		(substituted in) 62'
Manager:
Shu Kamo

ARGENTINA:
GK	1	Carlos Bossio
DF	2	Roberto Ayala
DF	3	José Chamot
DF	4	Javier Zanetti
DF	6	Néstor Fabbri
MF	5	Hugo Pérez
MF	7	Ariel Ortega		(substituted off) 67'
MF	8	Alejandro Escudero	(yellow card) 35'	(substituted off) 55'
MF	20	Christian Bassedas
FW	9	Gabriel Batistuta
FW	11	Pascual Rambert	(yellow card) 26'
Substitutions:
MF	18	Gustavo López		(substituted in) 55'
MF	17	Marcelo Gallardo		(substituted in) 67'
Manager:
Daniel Passarella

=== Nigeria v Argentina ===
10 January 1995
01:00 AST

Nigeria	0–0	Argentina
	Report

King Fahd II Stadium, Riyadh
Attendance: 20,000
Referee: Ali Bujsaim (United Arab Emirates)

Nigeria	Argentina

NIGERIA:
GK	1	Peter Rufai
DF	2	Augustine Eguavoen
DF	3	Benedict Iroha	(yellow card) 80'
DF	5	Uche Okechukwu
DF	20	Uche Okafor
MF	8	Mutiu Adepoju
MF	10	Jay-Jay Okocha		(substituted off) 51'
MF	11	Emmanuel Amunike	(yellow card) 77'
FW	12	Samson Siasia
FW	14	Daniel Amokachi
FW	18	Efan Ekoku		(substituted off) 76'
Substitutions:
MF	17	Sam Pam		(substituted in) 51'
MF	6	Momodu Mutairu		(substituted in) 76'
Manager:
Shuaibu Amodu

ARGENTINA:
GK	1	Carlos Bossio
DF	2	Roberto Ayala	(yellow card) 64'
DF	3	José Chamot
DF	4	Javier Zanetti
DF	6	Néstor Fabbri
MF	5	Hugo Pérez	(yellow card) 30'
MF	7	Ariel Ortega
MF	8	Alejandro Escudero
MF	20	Christian Bassedas
FW	9	Gabriel Batistuta
FW	11	Pascual Rambert
Substitutions:
Manager:
Daniel Passarella
