= Paso del Molino =

Coordinates: 34°51′S 56°13′W

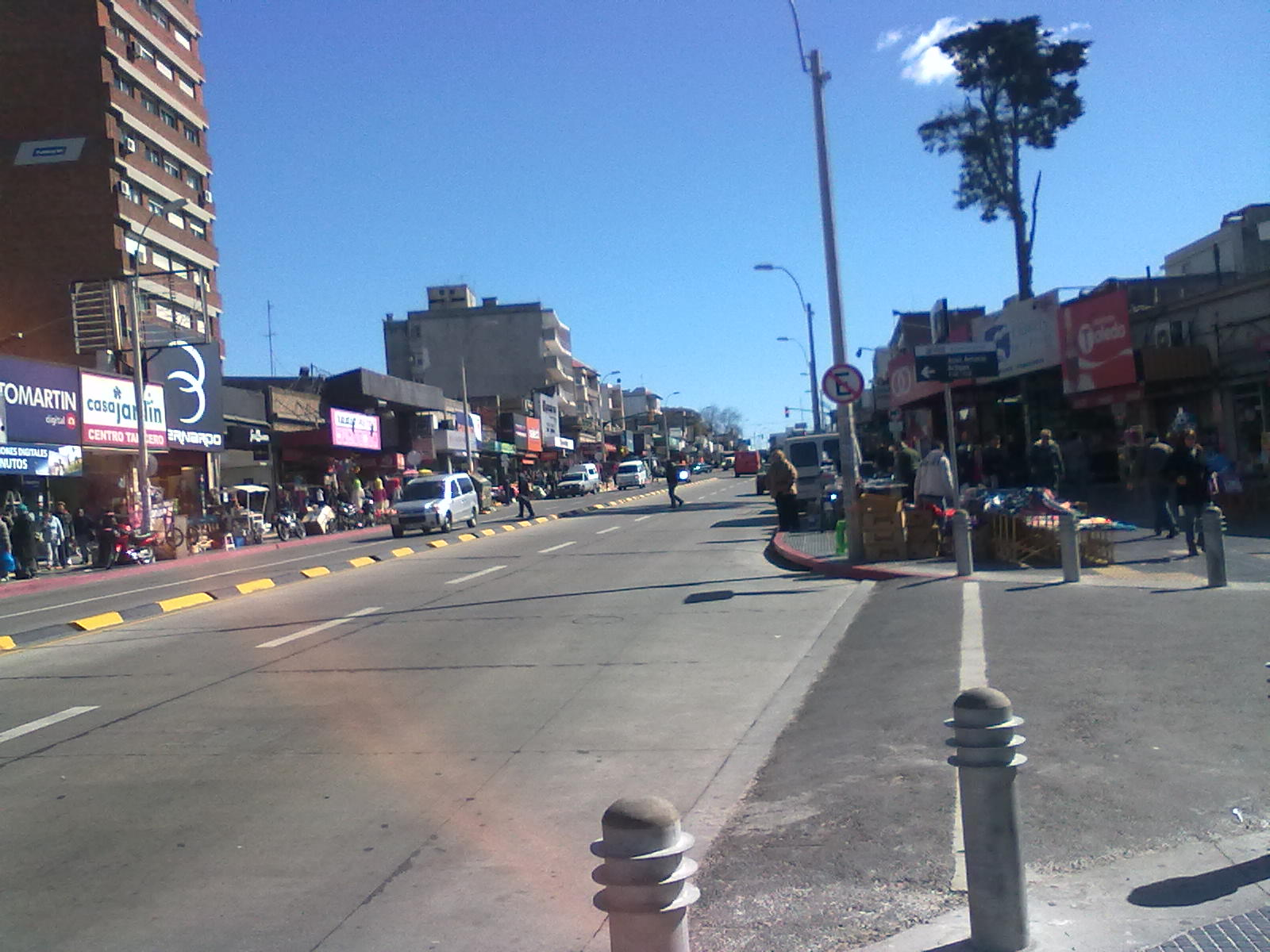
Street of Paso Molino neighborhood

Paso del Molino (Mill's Crossing) is a barrio (neighbourhood or district) of Montevideo, capital of Uruguay.
