= August 1902 =

Month in 1902

<<	August 1902					>>
Su	Mo	Tu	We	Th	Fr	Sa
					1	2
3	4	5	6	7	8	9
10	11	12	13	14	15	16
17	18	19	20	21	22	23
24	25	26	27	28	29	30
31

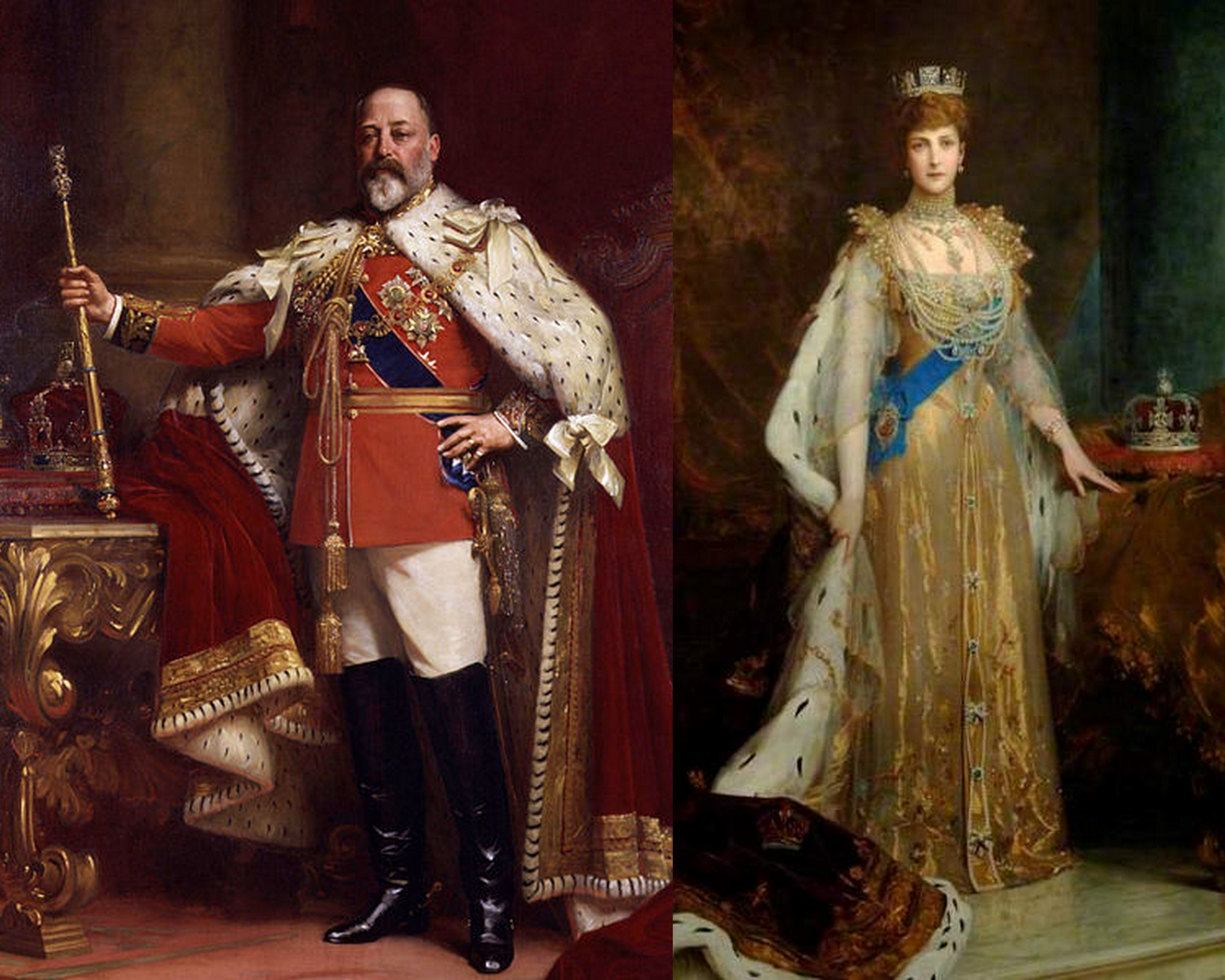
August 9, 1902: King Edward VII of the United Kingdom and Queen consort Alexandra crowned at Westminster Abbey.

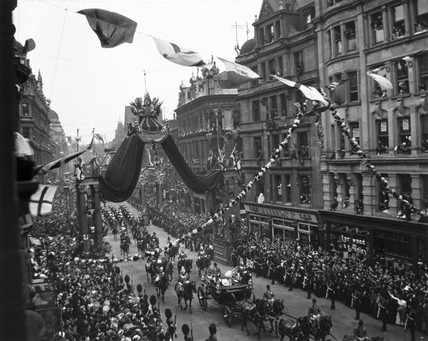
Thirty thousand people travel in the procession through London.

The following events occurred in August 1902:

== August 1, 1902 (Friday) ==
- The Mount Kembla Mine disaster at Wollongong, Australia, the worst mining disaster in the country's history, killed 96 miners. A royal commission appointed to look into the disaster later stated that only the substitution of safety lamps for flame lights could have saved the lives of the victims.
- Raffaele Palizzolo, a former Deputy from Palermo, Italy was jailed for the 1893 murder of banker Emanuele Notarbartolo, former mayor of Palermo, by the Assize Court in Bologna.
- In the United Kingdom, the Clitheroe by-election, brought about by the elevation to the House of Lords of the incumbent Liberal MP, was won by Labour Representation Committee candidate David Shackleton, who was unopposed.
- Born: Pete Latzo, American boxer and world welterweight champion 1926 to 1927; in Colerain, Pennsylvania (d. 1968)

== August 2, 1902 (Saturday) ==
- The Philippine opera Sangdugong Panaguinip (The Dreamed Alliance), the first opera to be performed in the Tagalog language, premiered at the Zorrilla Theatre in Manila.
- Born: Pope Cyril VI of Alexandria, Coptic Orthodox Patriarch from 1959 to 1971; in Damanhour, Egypt (d. 1971)

== August 3, 1902 (Sunday) ==
- The Philippine Independent Church was established by Isabelo de los Reyes and the recently excommunicated Catholic priest Gregorio Aglipay, and other Filipinos who were dissatisfied with the friars from Spain who dominated the Roman Catholic Church in the area. The new church rejected the concept of spiritual authority and infallibility of the Pope and abolished the celibacy requirement for priests.
- Died: August Klughardt, 54, German composer and conductor (b. 1847)

== August 4, 1902 (Monday) ==
- In the Tchipindo area of present-day Angola, Portuguese troops killed a small group of native rebels, including Mutu ya Kavela, a leading counsellor of "King" Kalandula.
- The Italian government ordered that all ships in the nation's navy be equipped with wireless telegraphic transmitters.
- The Belgian ship Wordsworth was wrecked off Assu Torre, Bahia, Brazil.
- The French soccer football team Cannes was founded by an English sportsman, Herbert Lowe, and a group of friends.

== August 5, 1902 (Tuesday) ==
- Anténor Firmin formed a rebel government in Haiti at Gonaïves.
- Spain's Prime Minister Práxedes Mateo Sagasta announced that he planned to retire from politics.

== August 6, 1902 (Wednesday) ==
- The Cunard Line ocean liner RMS Carpathia was launched from the shipyard in Wallsend in England, after being christened by the daughter of the Cunard Line vice-chairman. It would make its maiden voyage on May 5, 1903. Converted to a troop ship for World War I, Carpathia would be sunk by a German submarine on July 17, 1918.
- Died: Harry Tracy, 26, American outlaw, committed suicide after being wounded by a posse at Creston, Washington (b. 1875)

== August 7, 1902 (Thursday) ==
- José Plácido de Castro, a rebel against the government of Bolivia, declared the Bolivian province of Acre independent the day after capturing the town of Xapuri. The province would be annexed by Brazil the following year as the Acre War ended with the signing of the Treaty of Petrópolis.
- Died: Nikolaos Vokos, 48, Greek artist, died from an undisclosed illness.(b. 1854)

== August 8, 1902 (Friday) ==
- Wadiyar IV reached the age of 21 and assumed full power as the maharaja of the Kingdom of Mysore in British India, now part of the state of Karnataka. At the time of his death in 1940, Wadiyar IV would be one of the wealthiest men in the world. The regency of his mother, Kempa Nanjammani Vani Vilasa Sannidhana, ended after seven years.
- The Royal Commissions Act 1902, an Australian Act of Parliament, received royal assent, allowing the Governor-General to issue letters patent in the name of the Crown for a Commission of Inquiry.
- Sir Edmund Barton, Prime Minister of Australia, was knighted by King Edward VII, becoming the first incumbent prime minister to be knighted.
- The British Academy was founded in London as King Edward VII granted royal assent to its charter.
- On the eve of the coronation of King Edward VII, Charles T. Ritchie became the new British Chancellor of the Exchequer, Austen Chamberlain became the new Postmaster General, and the Earl of Dudley became the new Lord Lieutenant of Ireland of the United Kingdom.
- Born: Paul Dirac, English physicist known for the Dirac equation and his contributions to quantum mechanics and quantum electrodynamics, 1933 Nobel Prize in Physics laureate; in Bristol (d. 1984)
- Died: James Tissot, 65, French artist (b. 1836)

== August 9, 1902 (Saturday) ==
- The Coronation of Edward VII and Alexandra took place at Westminster Abbey, London, after delays caused by King Edward VII of the United Kingdom having to undergo emergency surgery during June. Georges Méliès's film The Coronation of Edward VII (a staged re-enactment containing actuality footage) was shown in London that same evening.
- Born:
  - Gujarmal Modi, Indian industrialist who founded the conglomerate Modi Enterprises in 1933; in Mahendragarh, Patiala State, British India (now in the Haryana state) (d. 1976)
  - Zino Francescatti, French violinist; in Marseille, Vaucluse département (d. 1991)
  - Henriette Dibon, French poet; in Avignon (d. 1989)

== August 10, 1902 (Sunday) ==
- In Japan's parliamentary elections the Rikken Seiyūkai party, formed a year earlier by former Prime Minister Itō Hirobumi, won 191 of the 376 seats in the Imperial Diet. General Katsura Tarō, who made a point of avoiding politics, remained the Prime Minister of Japan.
- Born:
  - Norma Shearer, Canadian-born American actress who won the 1930 Academy Award for Best Actress; in Montreal (d. 1983)
  - Arne Tiselius, Swedish biochemist and 1948 Nobel Prize in Chemistry laureate; in Stockholm (d. 1971)

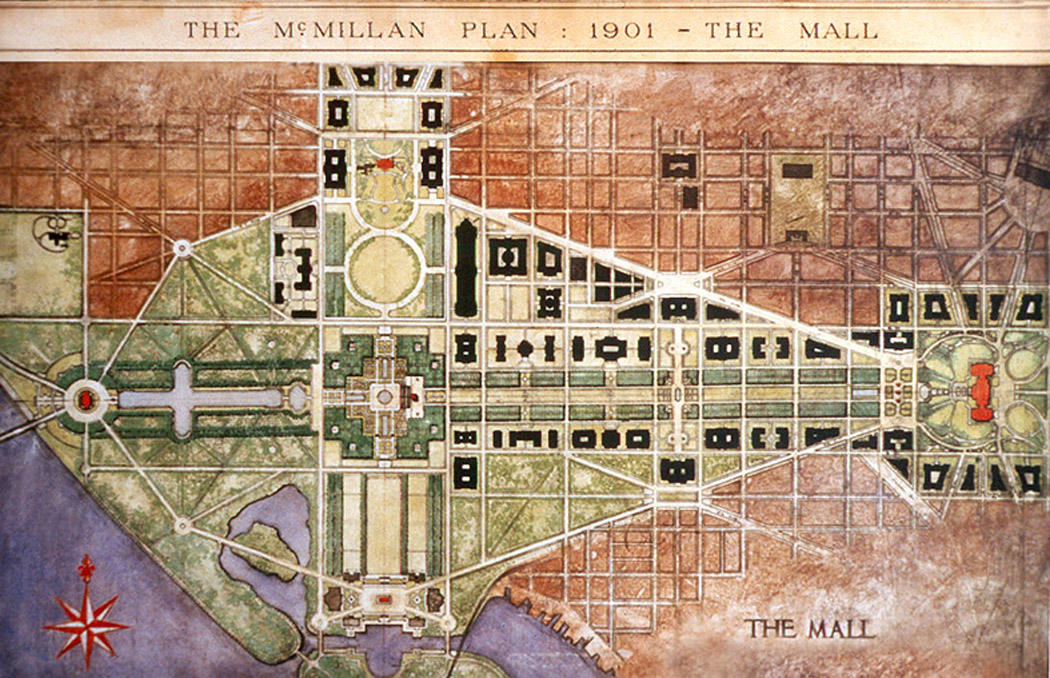
McMillan Commission Plan

- Died: U.S. Senator James McMillan, 64, known for chairing the McMillan Commission that devised the plan for the layout of the National Mall landscaping of memorials, monuments and government buildings in Washington, D.C. (b. 1838)

== August 11, 1902 (Monday) ==
- The Częstochowa pogrom was carried out against the Jewish community in the Russian-occupied city of Chenstokhov (now Częstochowa in Poland), killing 14 Jews.
- The conference of colonial premiers ended in London with the assembled colonial government leaders agreeing to adopt the metric system of weights and measures throughout the British Empire.
- By an overwhelming majority, the Chilean Congress ratified the arbitration treaty and the arms limitation treaty recently signed with Argentina.
- U.S. Supreme Court Justice Horace Gray publicly announced his retirement.
- Born:
  - Alfredo Binda, Italian cyclist, three-time UCI world champion and five-time winner of the Giro d'Italia; in Cittiglio (d. 1986)
  - Lloyd Nolan, U.S. film and television actor, 1955 Emmy Award for Best Actor winner; in San Francisco (d. 1985)

== August 12, 1902 (Tuesday) ==
- The German luxury ocean liner SS Kaiser Wilhelm II, operated by Norddeutscher Lloyd, was launched from the shipyard at Stettin (now Szczecin in Poland). It would have its maiden voyage on April 14, 1903.
- Venezuelan crisis of 1902–1903: After a battle in which 167 men were killed, rebels in Venezuela gained control of the city of Barcelona. At the request of the American ambassador to Venezuela, Herbert Wolcott Bowen, a U.S. Navy warship was dispatched to Caracas to protect American interests.
- The International Harvester Company was incorporated in Trenton, New Jersey, with start-up capital of $120 million.
- Canadian-born American inventor Reginald Fessenden was granted 13 separate U.S. patents for his wireless telegraphy inventions.
- While following two burglary suspects, Patrolmen Timothy T. Devine and Charles Pennell of the Chicago Police Department in Illinois were shot and killed in an ambush. Six suspects were arrested after Devine and Pennell's deaths. Another assailant would shoot and kill Pennsylvania State Constable Harry Foster "Darby" Bierer of Westmoreland County, Pennsylvania, on July 9, 1903, while Bierer was trying to arrest him for dynamiting a mine building in Luxor, Pennsylvania. The suspect would be hanged for Bierer's murder on February 11, 1904.
- Born: Mohammad Hatta, the first Vice President of Indonesia and third Prime Minister of Indonesia; in Fort de Kock, Dutch East Indies (now Bukittinggi, Indonesia) (d. 1980)

== August 13, 1902 (Wednesday) ==
- The former U.S. Navy ship USS Cheyenne, sold in 1900 and renamed the Jacob Kuper, exploded and sank off of the coast of Staten Island in New York Harbor near Tompkinsville, after its boiler exploded and killed four people.

== August 14, 1902 (Thursday) ==
- German chemist Wilhelm Normann was granted a patent for his 1901 invention of hydrogenation of fats in the production of margarine and vegetable shortening after applying for the patent on February 27, 1901.
- The city of Clarkston, Washington, on the opposite side of the Snake River from Lewiston, Idaho, was incorporated after being renamed for William Clark of the Lewis and Clark Expedition; Lewiston had been named in honor of the other leader of the expedition, Meriwether Lewis.
- A team of five explorers led by J. Norman Collie and guided by Hans Kaufmann made the first ascent of Howse Peak, at 10,810 feet (3,290 m) the highest peak in the Waputik Mountains of the Canadian Rockies.
- Born: Lillian Mary Pickford, pioneering British neuroendocrinologist; in Jubbulpore, Central Provinces, British India (now Japalpur, Madhya Pradesh state (d. 2002)

== August 15, 1902 (Friday) ==
- The city of Tianjin (at the time, spelled Tientsin in the western press) was returned to complete control of the Chinese government, after having been taken by the Eight-Nation Alliance during the Boxer Rebellion.
- In order to satisfy the requirement of being a member of parliament to be part of the British government, Postmaster General Austen Chamberlain was elected unopposed to a seat in the House of Commons.

== August 16, 1902 (Saturday) ==
- Having recently surrendered to the United Kingdom to end the Second Boer War, former South African Boer generals Louis Botha, Christiaan de Wet and Koos de la Rey were welcomed to England.
- King Edward VII was the honoree of Coronation Review at Spithead as the Royal Navy's Channel Fleet, which had defended the English Channel since 1854, passed in a line in front of the royal party, marking the first time that a review was performed at a British coronation.
- Born: Georgette Heyer, British novelist; in Wimbledon, London (d. 1974)

== August 17, 1902 (Sunday) ==
- Indian-born Albert De Wilton was appointed Inspector-General of Police and Prisons in British Ceylon.
- Born: Magda Staudinger, Latvian biologist and chemist; in Elva, Russian Empire (d. 1997)
- Died: John Dolbeer, 75, American lumber company entrepreneur and inventor of the first "steam donkey" logging engine, patented in 1882 (b. 1827)

== August 18, 1902 (Monday) ==
- A volcanic eruption killed at least 150 people on the island of Tori-shima in Japan The surviving residents were evacuated and the island, also referred to as "Bird Island", would never be repopulated and would become a bird sanctuary visited only by researchers.
- The Moro people on the Philippine island of Mindanao began a rebellion against local authorities.
- George Gardiner won the World Light Heavyweight boxing champion by knocking out Jack Root in the 17th round of a bout in Salt Lake City, Utah.
- Born:
  - Frans Hemerijckx, Belgian Flemish humanitarian who founded the Damine Foundation for treatment of leprosy; in Ninove, East Flanders, Belgium (d. 1969)
  - Adamson-Eric, Estonian artist, as Erich Carl Hugo Adamson; in Tartu, Russian Empire (d. 1968)
  - Luciana Frassati Gawronska, Italian writer; in Pollone (d. 2007)

== August 19, 1902 (Tuesday) ==
- The Browder Life Safety Net, used by firemen in the early 20th century to catch people jumping from a burning building, was given its first use during a fire when the New York City Fire Department saved the life of a baby dropped from the fourth floor of a tenement during a fire.
- Born:
  - Ogden Nash, American poet; in Rye, New York (d. 1971)
  - Gus Bootle, U.S. federal judge who oversaw the desegregation of the U.S. state of Georgia during his tenure from 1954 to 1972; in Walterboro, South Carolina (d. 2005)

== August 20, 1902 (Wednesday) ==
- U.S. President Theodore Roosevelt established the Alexander Archipelago Forest Reserve as federally-protected land in the U.S. Alaskan Territory, by presidential proclamation.
- The first match between two Romanian soccer football clubs took place at the Pădurea Verde in front of 100 spectators, as Reuniunea de Sport Lugoj defeated FC Timișoara, 3 to 2.
- Born: Li Fang-Kuei, Chinese linguist; in Guangzhou (d. 1987)

== August 21, 1902 (Thursday) ==
- A magnitude 7.3 earthquake struck the Moro Gulf, Mindanao, Philippines, causing over 100 deaths and substantial damage.
- The Carnegie Trust for the Universities of Scotland was incorporated after Andrew Carnegie's gift of $10 million, a native of Dunfermline who had become a successful industrialist after emigrating to the United States at the age of 12.
- The largest ocean liner in the world at the time, the White Star Line steamship RMS Cedric, was launched from Belfast, Ireland.
- Born: Narbal Fontes, popular Brazilian novelist; in Tietê, São Paulo (d. 1960)
- Died:
  - General Franz Sigel, 77, German military officer during the March Revolution, who later became a Union Army general during the American Civil War (b. 1824)
  - Bessie Bonehill, 47, English vaudeville comedienne and male impersonator who toured Europe and the United States, died from stomach cancer (b. 1855)

== August 22, 1902 (Friday) ==
- An earthquake of magnitude 7.7 struck Xinjiang Province, China, resulting in at least 2,500 deaths and considerable damage.
- The Cadillac Automobile Company was founded by two investors in the Ford Motor Company, William Murphy and Lemuel Bowen, to manufacture vehicles using the engine design of Henry M. Leland.
- Theodore Roosevelt traveled in a Columbia Electric Victoria automobile through Hartford, Connecticut, becoming the first President of the United States ever to travel by car.
- Asbury Latimer, a candidate in the United States Senate primary in South Carolina, assaulted rival Democratic candidate John J. Hemphill, while campaigning in the town of Gaffney.
- Born:
  - Leni Riefenstahl, German film director and Nazi propagandist; in Berlin (d. 2003)
  - Omer Poos, United States District Judge for Illinois from 1958 to 1976 (d. 1976)

== August 23, 1902 (Saturday) ==
- Monarchists in Brazil attempted a coup against President Manuel Ferraz de Campos Sales as part of a plan to restore the rule of the House of Orléans-Braganza for the first time since 1889. In hopes of installing Luís do Orléans-Braganza, a grandson of the last Emperor, Pedro II, to the throne, the mob briefly took control of the towns of Taquaritinga (at the time called and Espírito Santo do Pinhal in the state of Ribeirãozinho) in the state of São Paulo. The revolt failed to gain support, and the plan was abandoned one day after a brief takeover of the local police stations.
- American cookery pioneer Fannie Farmer opened her own cookery school in Boston.
- Born: Ida Siekmann, East German nurse who became the first person to be killed at the Berlin Wall; in Gorken, East Prussia, German Empire (now Górki in Poland) (d. 1961)

== August 24, 1902 (Sunday) ==
- A statue of Joan of Arc was unveiled in Saint-Pierre-le-Moûtier, France, a town she successfully took in 1429.
- Born: Carlo Gambino, Italian-American mobster; in Palermo, Sicily, Italy (d. 1976)

== August 25, 1902 (Monday) ==
- Parcel post services were inaugurated between the United States and the United Kingdom.
- Explorer Harry de Windt completed his overland trip from Paris to New York, after having traveled entirely by land (with the exception of the Bering Strait) across Europe, Russia and North America in 248 days.
- In war games of the United States Navy, a simulated invasion force, the "White Squadron", entered Salem Harbor off of the coast of Massachusetts and attempted to take control of it, but was repelled by the defending "Blue Squadron".
- Born: Stefan Wolpe, German composer; in Berlin (d. 1972)

== August 26, 1902 (Tuesday) ==
- In the Democratic primary election for the U.S. Senator to represent the state of South Carolina, William Elliott and John Gary Evans were selected to run off on September 9.
- U.S. Patent 707,699-A was granted for the first battery-powered hearing aid, invented by Miller Reese Hutchison and already on the market under the brand name "Acousticon".
- Born: On Watanabe, Japanese mystery novelist; in Yakomura, Hokkaido (killed in traffic accident, 1930)

== August 27, 1902 (Wednesday) ==
- The Men's Singles competition at the 1902 U.S. National Tennis Championships was won by William Larned of the United States, who defeated Reginald Doherty of the United Kingdom in four sets at the Newport Casino in Newport, Rhode Island.
- The town of Huxley, Iowa, was incorporated.
- The statue of Anders Sandøe Ørsted, the former Prime Minister of Denmark, was unveiled at the Ørstedsparken, a public park at Copenhagen.
- The French full-masted sailing ship Laennec was launched from Saint-Nazaire, France and named for Dr. René Laennec, inventor of the stethoscope. It would later be sold to a German company and renamed the Oldenburg in 1922, and in 1933 to the Finnish Navy and named the Suomen Joutsen (literally "Swan of Finland") and now serves as a floating museum.
- Born: Herbert Menges, English musical composer and conductor; in Hove, East Sussex (d. 1972)

== August 28, 1902 (Thursday) ==
- King Victor Emmanuel III of Italy and his Minister of Foreign Affairs, Giulio Prinetti, arrived in Berlin for a state visit to Germany.
- Born:
  - Margaret Murie, American conservationist described by the Sierra Club and The Wilderness Society as the "Grandmother of the Conservation Movement"; in Seattle (d. 2003)
  - Sir Patrick Linstead, English chemist; in Southgate, London, England (d. 1966)
  - Justin M. Andrews, American public health administrator for the Communicable Disease Center, and architect of the National Malaria Eradication Program; in Providence, Rhode Island (d. 1967)
- Died: George Douglas Brown, 33, English novelist, died of pneumonia a year after the publication of his bestselling novel The House with the Green Shutters (b. 1869)

== August 29, 1902 (Friday) ==
- A general strike took place in Florence as a result of an industrial dispute at the Pignone iron works. Troops were called out to quell any unrest.
- Representatives of Austria-Hungary, Belgium, Germany, Japan, the Netherlands, Spain and the United Kingdom signed a treaty with China for the revision of tariffs.
- The Government of Japan agreed to international arbitration on the issue of the liability of foreigners for taxes.
- Born: Verrier Elwin, British anthropologist; in Dover, Kent (d. 1964)
- Died: Reese C. De Graffenreid, 43, U.S. Representative for Texas since 1897 (b. 1859)

== August 30, 1902 (Saturday) ==
- In Martinique, Mount Pelée erupted again, with the resulting pyroclastic flow extending further than the flows of 8 and 20 May 1902, and destroying the settlements of Morne-Rouge and Ajoupa-Bouillon; over 1,000 people were killed altogether.
- Henry James's novel The Wings of the Dove was published in London by Constable & Co.
- Held as a prisoner since July by American forces on Mindanao in the Philippines, the Sultan of Binidayan was killed during an attempt to escape.
- Died: Theodore F. Seward, 67, American musicologist and social crusader known for recording and preserving Negro spirituals (including "Swing Low, Sweet Chariot", founder of the Brotherhood of Christian Unity, the Golden Rule Brotherhood, and the "Don't Worry" Clubs during the 19th century (b. 1835)

== August 31, 1902 (Sunday) ==
- A powerful storm struck the South African city of Port Elizabeth (now Gqeberha), destroying most of the ships in harbor. Of 28 ships in port, 19 were wrecked after being blown ashore.
- Died:
  - John Trivett Nettleship, 61, English author and book illustrator (b. 1841)
  - Mathilde Wesendonck, 73, German poet (b. 1828)
  - Charles H. Duprez, 69, American minstrel show performer and manager of Duprez & Benedict's Minstrels (b. 1833)
