= Duprez =

Duprez may refer to:

- Caroline Duprez (1832-1875), French soprano
- Gilbert Duprez (1806–1896), French tenor, singing teacher and minor composer
- June Duprez (1918–1984), English film actress
- Fred Duprez (1884–1938), American film actor and comedian who appeared mainly in British films
- Charles H. Duprez (1833–1902), American minstrel show performer and manager
  - Duprez & Benedict's Minstrels, an American minstrel group led by Charles H. Duprez and Lew Benedict that enjoyed its greatest popularity in the late 1860s and 1870s
- Karina Duprez (born 1946), Mexican director and former actress
