= October 1902 =

Month in 1902

<<	October 1902					>>
Su	Mo	Tu	We	Th	Fr	Sa
			1	2	3	4
5	6	7	8	9	10	11
12	13	14	15	16	17	18
19	20	21	22	23	24	25
26	27	28	29	30	31

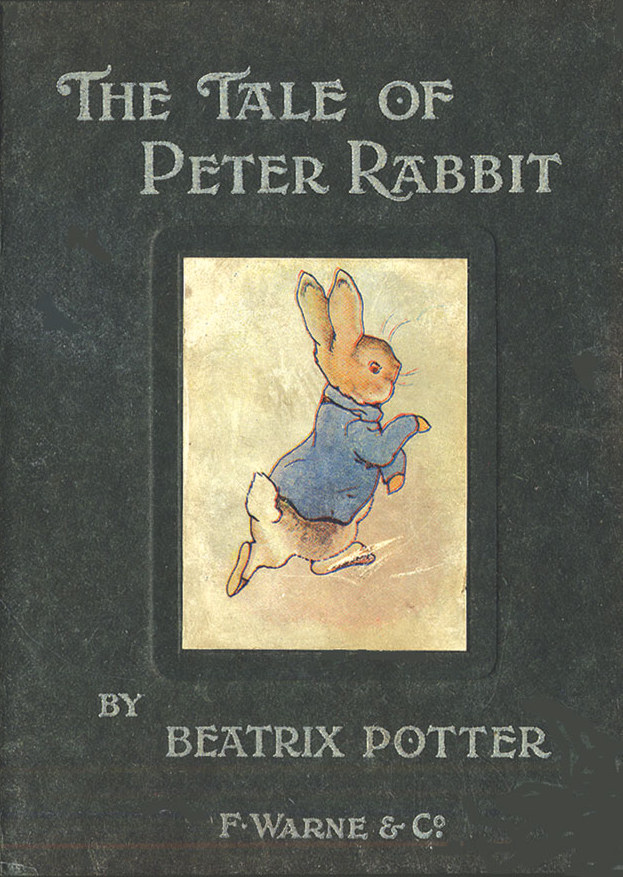
October 2, 1902: The Tale of Peter Rabbit published throughout Britain

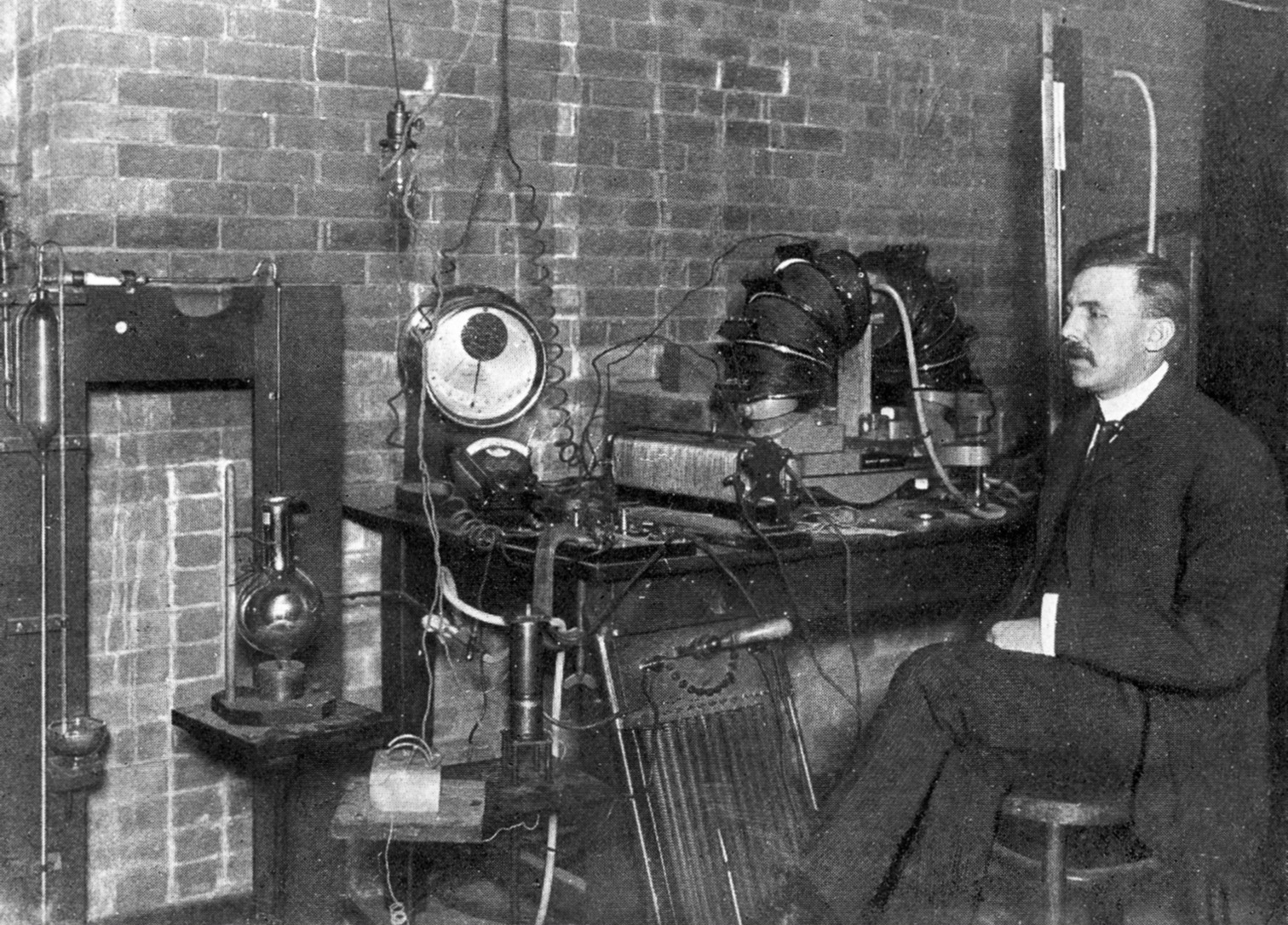
October 13, 1902: Ernest Rutherford sends wireless signal to moving train

The following events occurred in October 1902:

== October 1, 1902 (Wednesday) ==
- Dakar replaced Saint-Louis, Senegal, as capital of French West Africa.
- The Royal Navy established its Home Fleet, under Vice-Admiral Gerard Noel.
- After none of the candidates received a majority of the vote in the 1902 Vermont gubernatorial election, the state legislature voted to select J. G. McCullough, who had finished in first place in the general election a month earlier.

== October 2, 1902 (Thursday) ==
- Beatrix Potter's illustrated children's book The Tale of Peter Rabbit, was commercially published by Frederick Warne & Co.
- Born: Leopold Figl, future Chancellor of Austria, in Rust im Tullnerfeld, Austria (d. 1965)

== October 3, 1902 (Friday) ==
- U.S. President Theodore Roosevelt convened a conference of representatives of government, labor, and management, in a bid to end the long-running anthracite workers' strike. The United Mine Workers declined President Roosevelt's request that the striking miners return to work while the U.S. Congress acted on their demands.

== October 4, 1902 (Saturday) ==
- The Central American Court of Compulsory Arbitration was created in San Jose, Costa Rica. Of the five Central American nations, Guatemala declined to participate and the court agreement was binding only upon Costa Rica, El Salvador, the Honduras and Nicaragua.

== October 5, 1902 (Sunday) ==
- The funeral of French novelist Émile Zola, who died a week earlier in mysterious circumstances, took place at the Cimetière de Montmartre in Paris. It was attended by thousands, including Alfred Dreyfus, whose innocence Zola had protested.
- U.S. Army Captain John J. Pershing completed a campaign of subduing the Moros on the Philippine island of Mindanao, after having destroyed 140 forts. The dead included the Sultan of Cabugatan.
- Born:
  - Ray Kroc, American fast food entrepreneur known for creating the McDonald's restaurant chain; in Oak Park, Illinois (d. 1984)
  - Larry Fine, American actor and comedian who was one of The Three Stooges; in Philadelphia, Pennsylvania (d. 1975)

== October 6, 1902 (Monday) ==
- The laying down of the first telegraphic cable between Canada and Australia was completed, with the connection of a cable 3,455 nautical miles (3,976 mi) in length between Vancouver and Australia's Fanning Island.
- An earthquake of magnitude 7.2 struck the Hindu Kush region of Afghanistan.

== October 7, 1902 (Tuesday) ==
- Representatives of France and the Kingdom of Siam (now Thailand) signed a convention to settle the disputed boundary between Siam and French Indochina.
- The British Miners' Federation voted to send money to striking coal mine workers in the U.S. state of Pennsylvania.

== October 8, 1902 (Wednesday) ==
- Russia formally transferred part of its Russian Manchuria territory back to China, with the restoration to the Chinese of land south of the Liau River.

== October 9, 1902 (Thursday) ==
- In Altona, Manitoba in Canada, Henry Toews, a teacher at the Mennonite School, shot one or more colleagues and three children before wounding himself; he would survive another three months but would die before a trial could be arranged. Only one of his victims, Anna Kehler, died as a result of the shooting.
- The Supreme Court of Nebraska ruled that mandatory prayer, Bible reading and hymn singing in public schools was prohibited by the state constitution.
- The first season of the Primera Fuerza football competition begins in Mexico.

== October 10, 1902 (Friday) ==
- The U.S. Navy refused to allow the government of Colombia to send soldiers across the Isthmus of Panama.
- The Japanese steamer Yoshina Maru was abandoned after catching fire in the Van Diemen Strait. The ship drifted ashore at Kagoshima, Japan.

== October 11, 1902 (Saturday) ==
- The U.S. Open golf tournament was won by Scotland's Laurie Auchterlonie.

== October 12, 1902 (Sunday) ==
- On Mindanao in the Philippine Islands, the Sultan of Bacolod rejected the offer of U.S. Navy Commander Sumner.

== October 13, 1902 (Monday) ==
- New Zealand scientist Ernest Rutherford, while working at McGill University in Canada, demonstrated the first wireless communication system with a moving vehicle. Operating from a railway station, McGill contacted a moving train using a Grand Trunk Railway passenger train that was traveling between Toronto and Montreal.
- Born: Arna Bontemps, American writer, in Alexandria, Louisiana (d. 1973)

== October 14, 1902 (Tuesday) ==
- John O' Donnell, one of the Irish members of parliament for the House of Commons of the United Kingdom, was convicted of intimidation and incitement of a boycott, and sentenced by the Crimes Act Court to six months imprisonment.

== October 15, 1902 (Wednesday) ==
- Following discussions with the United Mine Workers and with representatives of major coal operators in Pennsylvania, U.S. President Roosevelt appointed six people to a special commission to investigate working conditions.

== October 16, 1902 (Thursday) ==
- The first British youth offenders institution opened at the Borstal prison, in Rochester, Kent.
- The House of Commons of the UK suspended John O'Donnell from membership because he had insulted the Prime Minister.
- In Paris, the murder of a servant was discovered, leading to the arrest of the murderer, Henri-Léon Scheffer, through fingerprint identification,
- UMWA President Mitchell issued a call to members to meet as delegates in a convention to vote on a proposition to return to work.

== October 17, 1902 (Friday) ==
- By a margin of 529 to 233, the French Chamber of Deputies voted a motion of confidence in the Prime Minister of his government for their policy of enforcement of the Associations Law.

== October 18, 1902 (Saturday) ==
- Born:
  - Miriam Hopkins, American actress, in Savannah, Georgia (d. 1972)
  - Pascual Jordan, German physicist, in Hanover (d. 1980)

== October 19, 1902 (Sunday) ==
- Died: Jim Younger, 54, American outlaw who committed crimes with Jesse James as part of the James–Younger Gang, committed suicide a year after his parole.

== October 20, 1902 (Monday) ==
- In the Philippines, the 8-member Second Philippine Commission of 5 Americans and 3 Filipinos passed Act No. 484, opening bids for the building of an electric power grid to Manila, as well as the first electric streetcar system. Only one person submitted a bid, which was awarded to Charles M. Swift on March 24, and created the Manila Electric Railroad and Light Company, or "MERALCo."

== October 21, 1902 (Tuesday) ==
- Delegates of the United Mine Workers met in Wilkes-Barre, Pennsylvania and voted unanimously to call off the anthracite coal mine strike in order to allow Congress to investigate working conditions and to make recommendations.
- Serving as the neutral arbitrator in the controversy between Germany and the U.S. and the UK over a dispute in Samoa, King Oscar II of Sweden ruled in favor of Germany.
- Canadian Public Works minister Joseph-Israël Tarte was fired by Prime Minister Wilfrid Laurier after public questioning Laurier's plans to revise Canada's tariff system.

== October 22, 1902 (Wednesday) ==
- Denmark's Landstinget voted on ratification of the treaty to sell the Danish West Indies to the United States. The vote was 33 in favor, and 33 against, and the treaty failed by a single vote.

== October 23, 1902 (Thursday) ==
- The coal strike of 1902 of Pennsylvania's anthracite miners ended after 163 days, following an agreement to have arbitration of the dispute.
- General Rafael Uribe Uribe and his remaining 1,500 Colombian rebels surrendered to government forces at La Ciénaga.

== October 24, 1902 (Friday) ==
- J. P. Farrell became the second Irish M.P. in the United Kingdom House of Commons to be sentenced to imprisonment for violating the Crimes Act.
- A jury in Cheyenne, Wyoming, found Tom Horn guilty of murder.
- One of the largest volcanic eruption of the 20th century occurs at Santa María in Guatemala; over 6,000 people died.

== October 25, 1902 (Saturday) ==
- In Jamestown, New York, 19-year-old George Edwin McClurg, substituting for an injured player at left halfback on the Jamestown High School football team, died of a brain hemorrhage caused by an injury in a game against the Central High School team from Buffalo, New York. The game ended an 11-11 tie. Jamestown High School canceled the remainder of its football season.
- In a freak accident, 20-year-old Stanton Walker, a spectator at an amateur baseball game in Morristown, Ohio, died after a foul ball struck his hand, accidentally driving a knife he was holding into his chest.
- Born: Eddie Lang, American jazz guitarist; in Philadelphia (d. 1933)
- Died: Frank Norris, 32, American novelist, died of peritonitis, following surgery on a burst appendix (b. 1870)

== October 26, 1902 (Sunday) ==
- Departing on their next stop for the 1902 Russian polar expedition, a group of Russian explorers led by Baron Eduard von Toll left their camp on Bennett Island and disappeared without a trace.
- Voting took place in Switzerland for the 167 seats of the National Council, with the Free Democratic Party of Switzerland winning 100 seats for a majority.
- The São Paulo Athletic Club finished in first place at the end of first season of competitive football in Brazil,
- Born: Jack Sharkey, American heavyweight boxing champion; in Binghamton, New York (d. 1994)
- Died: Elizabeth Cady Stanton, 86, American social activist (b. 1815)

== October 27, 1902 (Monday) ==
- China recalled its Minister to the United States, Wu Ting Fang, to serve in a different capacity.

== October 28, 1902 (Tuesday) ==
- The British freighter ship SS Ventnor sank two days after striking a reef while sailing from Wellington Harbour in New Zealand on a voyage to Hong Kong. While the crew evacuated the ship before it sank, one of the four lifeboats capsized, killing all 13 people aboard. The ship went down with its cargo, including the bodies of 499 Chinese gold miners whose remains were being taken back to China.

== October 29, 1902 (Wednesday) ==
- The records of Vice Admiral William Bligh, known for the 1789 Mutiny on the Bounty, were made public 85 years after his death, with the presentation of his papers to the State Library of New South Wales, by Bligh's grandson William Russell Bligh.

== October 30, 1902 (Thursday) ==
- The U.S. government's newly-appointed Anthracite Coal Strike Commission began its inspection of working conditions in coal mines.

== October 31, 1902 (Friday) ==
- A partial solar eclipse occurred.
- Born: Carlos Drummond de Andrade, Brazilian poet, in Itabira (d. 1987)
