= November 1902 =

Month in 1902

<<	November 1902					>>
Su	Mo	Tu	We	Th	Fr	Sa
						1
2	3	4	5	6	7	8
9	10	11	12	13	14	15
16	17	18	19	20	21	22
23	24	25	26	27	28	29
30

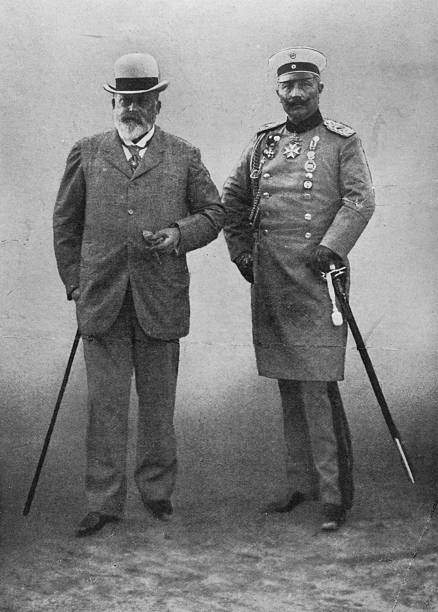
November 11, 1902: King Edward VII and nephew Kaiser Wilhelm II agree to British and German blockade of Venezuela

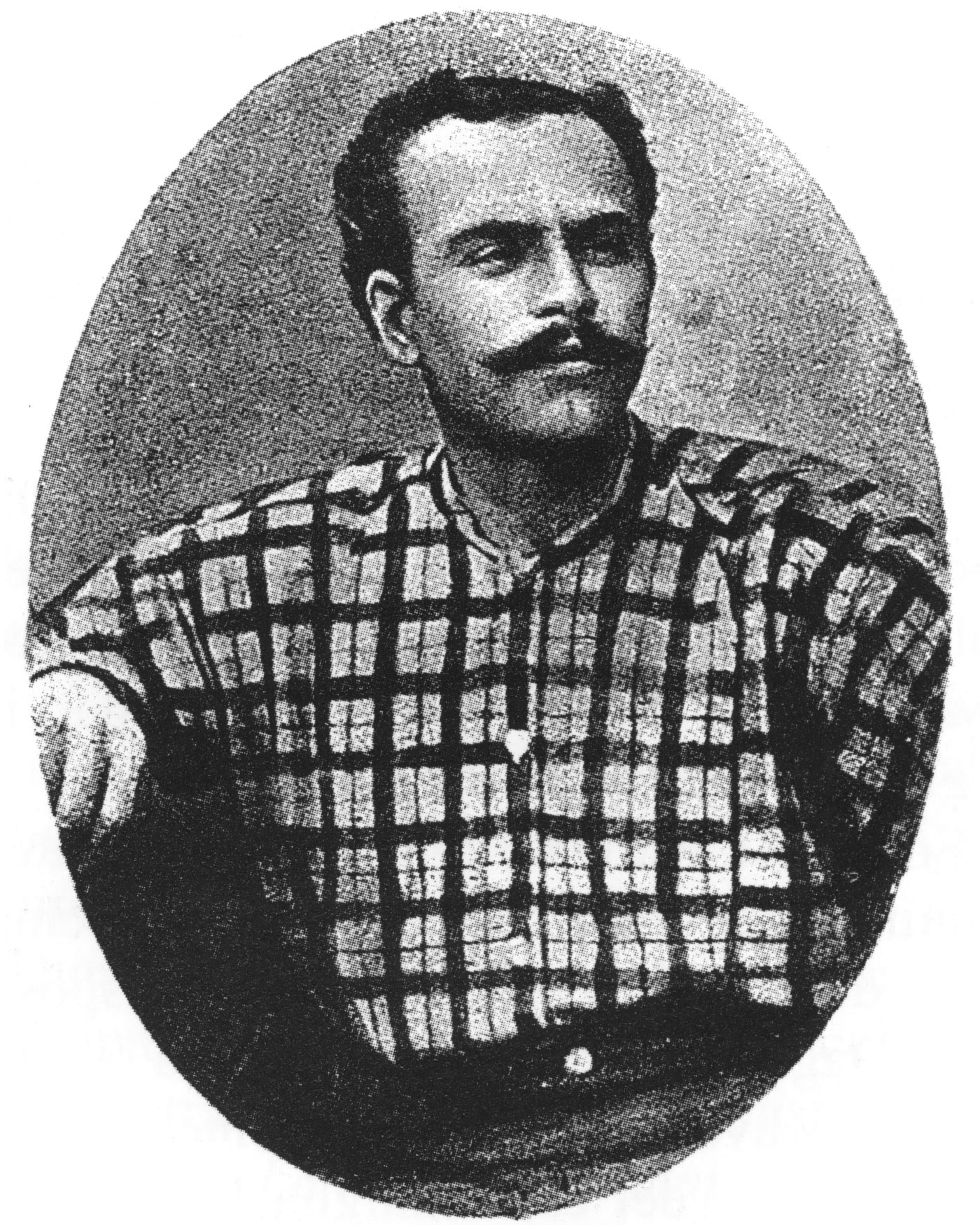
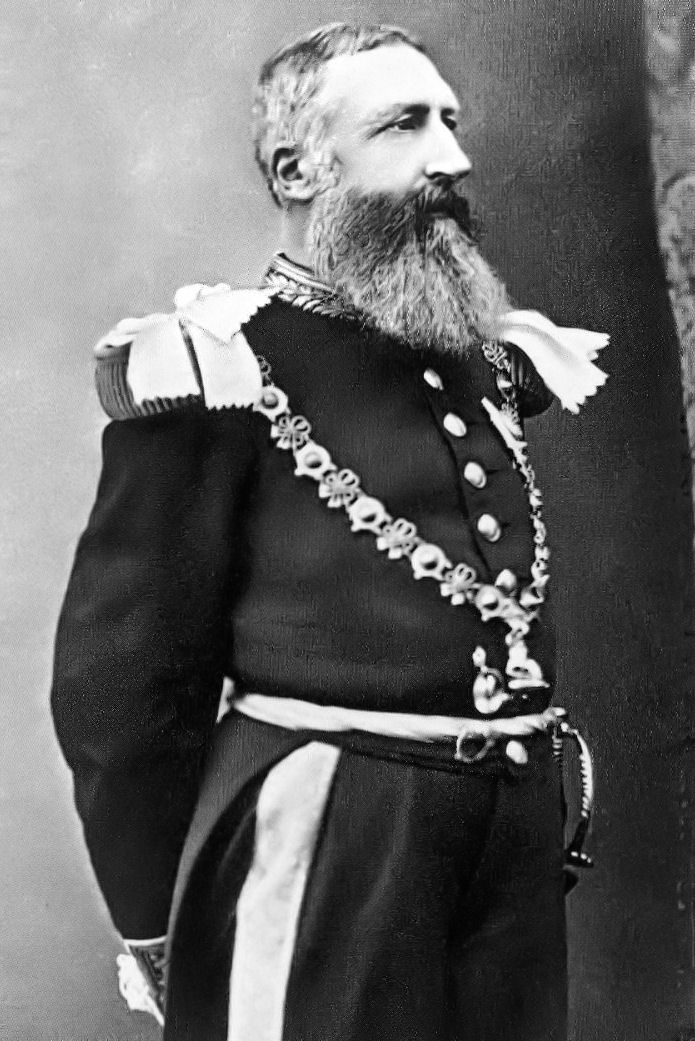
November 15, 1902: Gennaro Rubino tries to assassinate Belgium's King Leopold II

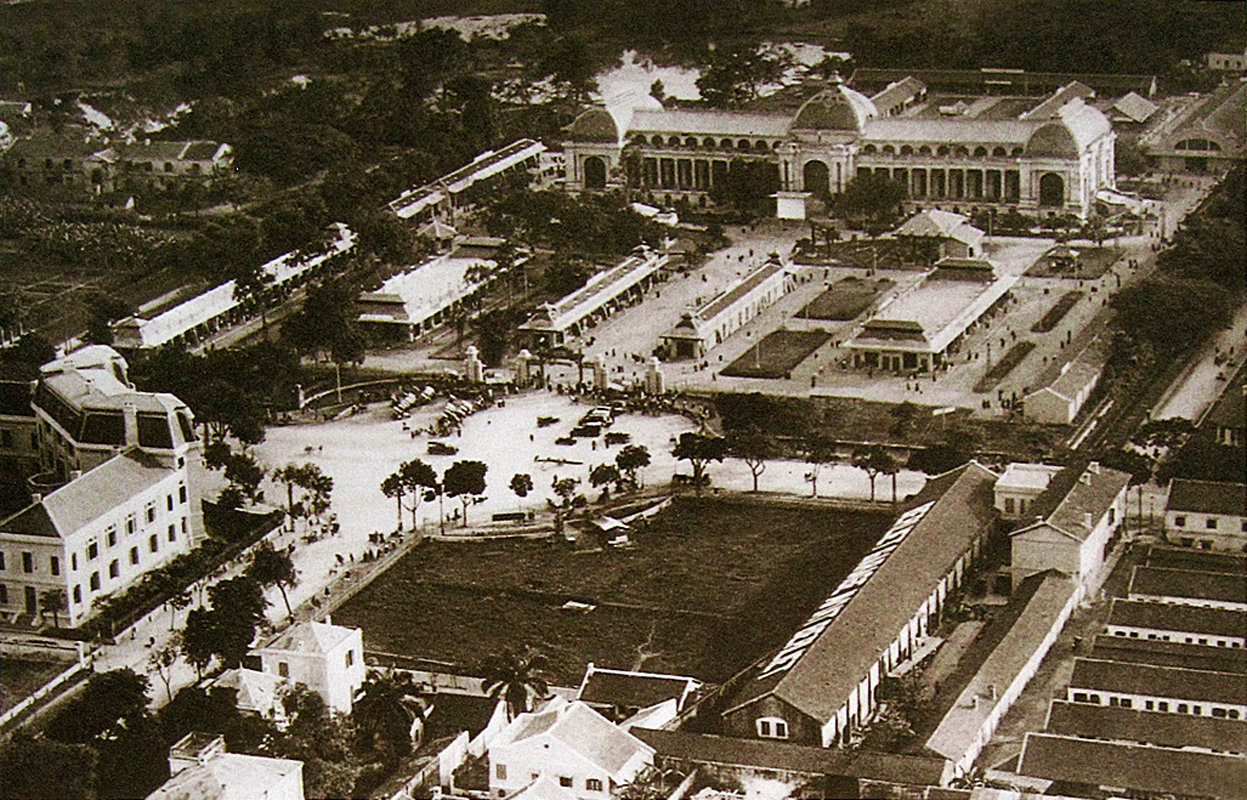
November 15, 1902: Hanoi World's Fair opened in French Indochina

The following events occurred in November 1902:

== November 1, 1902 (Saturday) ==
- Born: Eugen Jochum, German conductor; in Babenhausen, Bavaria (d. 1987)

== November 2, 1902 (Sunday) ==
- The Golden State Limited passenger train, running between Chicago and Los Angeles, was inaugurated.
- Born: Princess Mafalda of Savoy, the daughter of King Victor Emmanuel III of Italy and his wife Elena of Montenegro; in Rome (d. 1944)

== November 3, 1902 (Monday) ==
- The first communications cable between Australia and Canada was inaugurated at Southport, Queensland, was activated in a ceremony by Australia's Postmaster-General, James Drake. The other end of the undersea telegraph cable was a station in Vancouver, British Columbia.
- The British Antarctic Expedition began with the departure of Scottish explorers on the steamer Scotia.

== November 4, 1902 (Tuesday) ==
- An explosion of fireworks killed 15 people in New York City's Madison Square.
- The government of Venezuela announced that the revolution in the South American nation had ended.
- William Redmond became the third Irish MP in the UK House of Commons to be arrested on charges of violating the Crimes Act.
- Election Day took place in 22 of the 46 states of the U.S., including New York.

== November 5, 1902 (Wednesday) ==
- The sinking of the Australian passenger ship SS Elingamite killed 45 people as the vessel foundered near the Three Kings Islands in New Zealand, in a thick fog. Another 150 people were rescued.
- Elections were held in Austria for the lower house of parliament, the Reichsrat. The Christian Socialist Party won 50 of the 78 seats.
- The UK House of Commons approved a $40 million package of financial aid to Britain's South African colonies.
- A French arbitration commission ruled that striking coal miners were not entitled to an increase in their wages. Miners voted at Lens to return to work on November 13.

== November 6, 1902 (Thursday) ==
- In the United Kingdom, the Liverpool East Toxteth by-election, brought about by the resignation of sitting MP Augustus Frederick Warr was retained for the Conservatives by Austin Taylor. The day before, the Cleveland by-election was won by Herbert Samuel who retained the seat for the Liberals, with an increased majority.

== November 7, 1902 (Friday) ==
- Sir Marcus Samuel was installed as the Lord Mayor of London.

== November 8, 1902 (Saturday) ==
- A reciprocal trade treaty was signed by the United States and by the Dominion of Newfoundland, which was separate from Canada at the time.
- Canada's government dispatched the Royal Canadian Mounted Police to stop a winter pilgrimage by a group of dissatisfied members of the Doukhobors, a religious group that had migrated to British Columbia from Russia.

== November 9, 1902 (Sunday) ==
- Born: Anthony Asquith, British film director, son of H. H. Asquith and Margot Asquith; in London (d. 1968)

== November 10, 1902 (Monday) ==
- Bocconi University was founded in Milan by Italian politician Ferdinando Bocconi, in memory of his late son Luigi.
- The Birthday Honours list was issued by Britain's King Edward VII. Those honoured included art collector Max Waechter, Chief Justice of the Supreme Court of Hong Kong Meigh Goodman, and Australian newspaper proprietor John Winthrop Hackett, all of whom received knighthoods.

== November 11, 1902 (Tuesday) ==
- Kaiser Wilhelm II of Germany visited his uncle, King Edward VII of the United Kingdom, at Sandringham House. The summit meeting resulted in an agreement on future action in South America, which would lead to the Venezuelan crisis in December.
- The supporting party of Britain's Discovery Expedition to Antarctica, led by Robert Falcon Scott, Edward Adrian Wilson and Ernest Shackleton, overtook the "Farthest South" record of 78°50′ S, set by Norway's Carsten Borchgrevink.

== November 12, 1902 (Wednesday) ==
- Germany agreed to a U.S. proposal to submit the question, of whether the Chinese indemnity should be paid in gold or in silver, to the Hague Tribunal for a ruling.

== November 13, 1902 (Thursday) ==
- Germany's Reichstag voted to amend its tariff bill to permit the German government to retaliate against any nations that discriminated against Germany and German nationals.

== November 14, 1902 (Friday) ==
- The newly formed Anthracite Coal Strike Commission, set up by agreement of labor and management representatives, began the taking of witness testimony as it opened its investigation in Scranton, Pennsylvania.

== November 15, 1902 (Saturday) ==
- Italian anarchist Gennaro Rubino failed in an attempt to assassinate Belgium's King Leopold II. The King was returning from a memorial service for his wife, who had recently died. Rubino was seized by the crowd and arrested by police.
- The Hanoi Exhibition world's fair opened in Hanoi, the capital of French Indochina.
- Rodrigues Alves was sworn in for a four-year term as the fifth President of Brazil, succeeding Manuel Ferraz de Campos Sales.
- Italy's ailing Prime Minister Giuseppe Zanardelli attempted to introduce various social reforms, including changes to taxation and a divorce bill.
- A lawsuit was filed in federal court in the U.S. state of Virginia to prevent certification of the new state constitution and of Virginia's 10 U.S. Congressmen, on grounds that no election had actually been held.

== November 16, 1902 (Sunday) ==
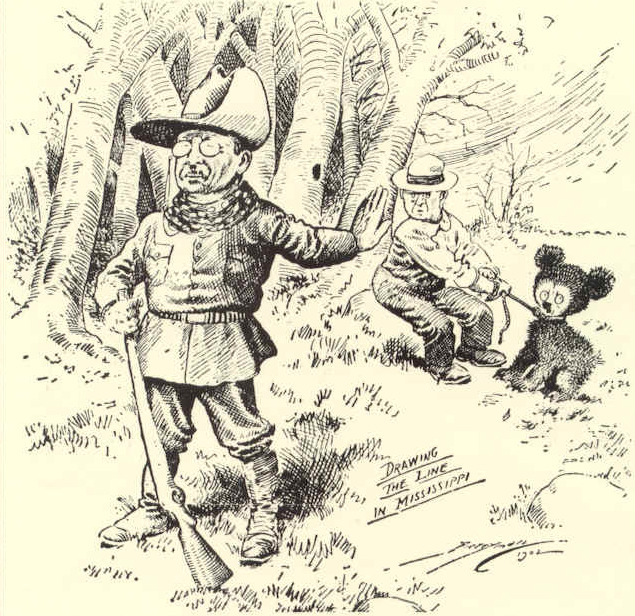
Berryman's Teddy Bear cartoon

- The image and name of what would become the "Teddy bear" stuffed animal toy was created in an editorial cartoon by Clifford K. Berryman of The Washington Post. Captioned "Drawing the Line in Mississippi", the cartoon referred to U.S. President Theodore Roosevelt's work at settling a boundary dispute between the U.S. states of Mississippi and Louisiana, but also to an incident two days earlier when Roosevelt refused to shoot a bear cub. The cartoon, in turn, inspired toy manufacturer Morris Michtom to create the stuffed animal which he originally marketed as "Teddy's bear".

== November 17, 1902 (Monday) ==
- The ashes of Christopher Columbus were deposited in a mausoleum in the cathedral at Seville in Spain.
- Born: Eugene Wigner, Hungarian physicist and Nobel Prize laureate; in Budapest (d. 1995)

== November 18, 1902 (Tuesday) ==
- The British steamer SS Greenock collided with another steamer, SS Ape, near Gourock Bay and Cloch Point in the River Clyde, Scotland. One crew member was lost.

== November 19, 1902 (Wednesday) ==
- Diplomatic relations were established between Persia and Greece for the first time in 24 centuries. The last time there had been a Persian ambassador to Athens had been in 492 BC, until the Persian King Darius the Great ordered Persian invasion of Greece.

== November 20, 1902 (Thursday) ==
- The Cordillera of the Andes Boundary Case, a territorial dispute between Argentina and Chile, was decided in favour of Argentina.
- British administrator Hallam Tennyson, former Governor of the state of South Australia and son of the late poet Alfred, Lord Tennyson, was appointed Governor-General to succeed Lord Hopetoun.
- Martial law was ended by the British administrators of the recently conquered Transvaal Colony, which had formerly been the South African Republic until the British victory in the Second Boer War.

== November 21, 1902 (Friday) ==
- A peace treaty to end the Colombian Civil War was signed between representatives of the government of Colombia and the leader of the anti-government Liberal guerrillas. The signing ceremony took place aboard the USS Wisconsin, anchored off of the Isthmus of Panama, which was part of the Republic of Colombia at the time.
- Edward Prior replaced James Dunsmuir as Premier of British Columbia in Canada.
- Born: Mikhail Suslov, Soviet politician; in Shakhovskoye, Russia (d. 1982)

== November 22, 1902 (Saturday) ==
- The House of Commons of the United Kingdom voted to abolish its tariff on imported sugar and to accept the Brussels Convention, despite the objections of Prime Minister Arthur J. Balfour.
- Died:
  - Friedrich Alfred Krupp, 48, German industrialist was found dead in a possible suicide. (b. 1854)
  - Walter Reed, 51, American army physician who led the fight to eradicate yellow fever, and for whom the Walter Reed Army Hospital is named, died of (peritonitis). (b. 1851)

== November 23, 1902 (Sunday) ==
- Born: Victor Jory, Canadian actor; in Dawson City, Yukon (d. 1982)

== November 24, 1902 (Monday) ==
- U.S. President Roosevelt awarded the contract for construction of a transpacific undersea telegraph cable to the Commercial Cable Company.

== November 25, 1902 (Tuesday) ==
- The first round of voting in the elections for 76 of the 80 seats of the New Zealand House of Representatives was held. Voting for the four Māori electorates would take place on December 22. While the New Zealand Liberal Party of Prime Minister Richard Seddon lost two seats, it retained its majority with 47 seats, compared to 19 for the Conservative Party and 14 for independent candidates.
- King Edward VII of the United Kingdom, acting as arbitrator in the border dispute between Argentina and Chile, announced his decision.
- Negotiations between the U.S. and Colombia for a lease of an American zone on Colombia's isthmus of Panama were suspended.

== November 26, 1902 (Wednesday) ==
- Italian opposition leader Sidney Sonnino tabled a reform bill intended to alleviate poverty in the impoverished southern part of the nation, by measures such as reducing land taxes in Sicily, Calabria and Sardinia.

== November 27, 1902 (Thursday) ==
- The Kingdom of Siam, now Thailand, suspended its production of silver coins.

== November 28, 1902 (Friday) ==
- The Danish language opera Saul og David, with libretto composed by Einar Christiansen and written by Carl Nielsen, was given its first public performance, making its debut at the Royal Danish Theatre in Copenhagen.
- Scottish mining engineer Robert Williams was granted a 99-year concession by Portugal for construction of the Benguela railway in the colony of Portuguese East Africa, later the People's Republic of Mozambique. "A Portuguese concession to construct a railway".

== November 29, 1902 (Saturday) ==
- At The Hague, Dutch judge Tobias Asser, issued his decision of the amount of damages to be awarded by the government of Russia, arising from the seizure of the boats of American seal hunters.

== November 30, 1902 (Sunday) ==
- Kid Curry Logan, the second-in-command of Butch Cassidy's Wild Bunch gang in the American "Wild West", was sentenced to 20 years hard labor.
