= September 1902 =

Month in 1902

<<	September 1902					>>
Su	Mo	Tu	We	Th	Fr	Sa
	1	2	3	4	5	6
7	8	9	10	11	12	13
14	15	16	17	18	19	20
21	22	23	24	25	26	27
28	29	30

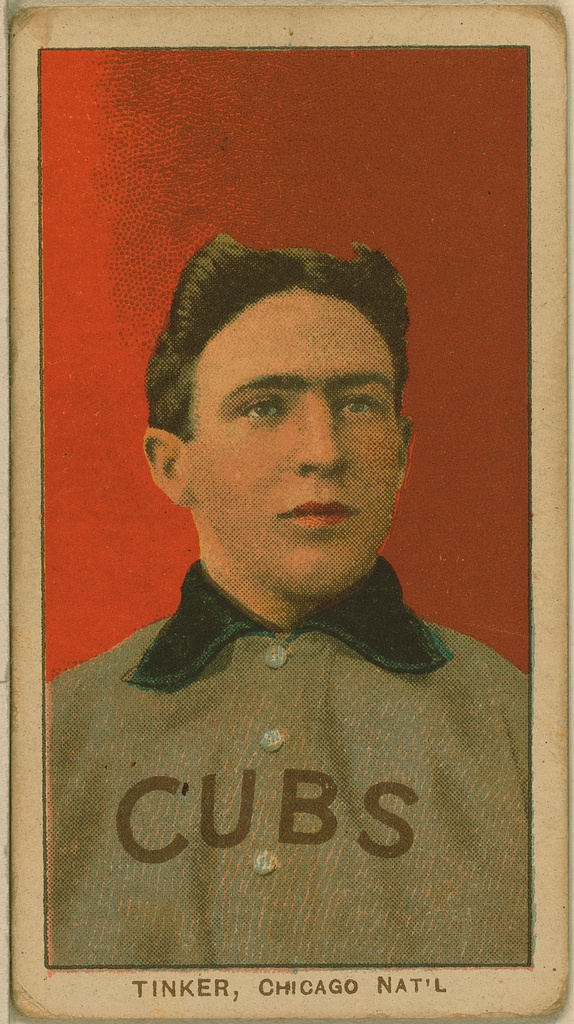
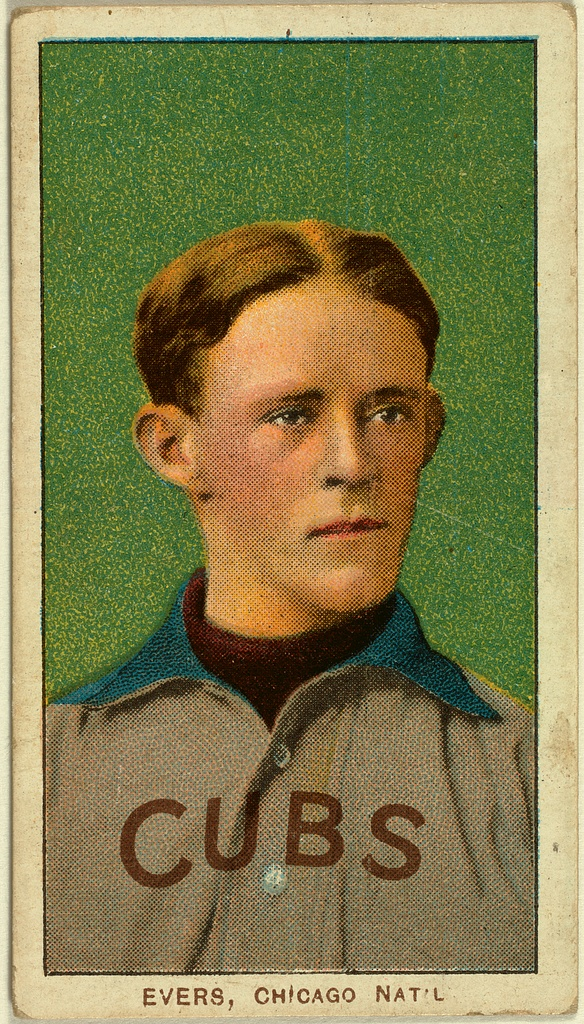
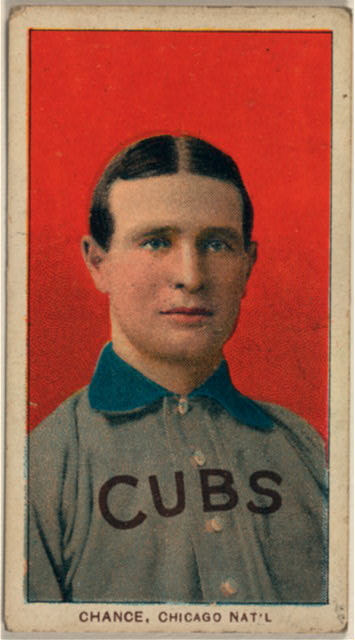
September 13, 1902: Tinker, Evers and Chance team up for a double play for the first time

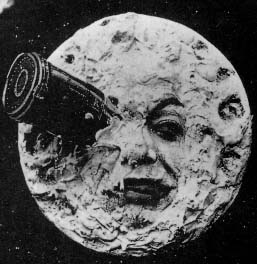
September 1, 1902: French sci-fi film A Trip to the Moon premieres in Paris

The following events occurred in September 1902:

== September 1, 1902 (Monday) ==
- The classic silent film, Le Voyage dans La Lune (A Trip to the Moon), was released at the Théâtre Robert-Houdin in Paris, France, by actor/producer Georges Méliès, and proved an instant success.

== September 2, 1902 (Tuesday) ==
- Haitian admiral, Hammerton Killick, a supporter of presidential candidate Anténor Firmin, captured the German ammunition ship, the Markomannia, which was on its way to provide ammunition to Firmin's rival Pierre Nord Alexis.
- General Zontchev, leader of the Secret Macedonian-Adrianople Revolutionary Organization, was arrested and taken in Bulgaria and taken to Sofia to stand trial.
- The U.S. state of Vermont held an election for Governor, with no candidate receiving a majority of the vote, and the election had to be decided by the state legislature. Republican John G. McCullough received 45.6% of the vote, and Local Option Party candidate Percival W. Clement had 40.3%.

== September 3, 1902 (Wednesday) ==
- U.S. President Theodore Roosevelt narrowly escaped death in Pittsfield, Massachusetts, after a streetcar collided with the carriage in which he was riding. Roosevelt's bodyguard, agent William Craig of the United States Secret Service was killed. President Roosevelt was only slightly injured, but developed an abscess on his leg that forced him to abandon his cross-country tour on September 23 and to return for medical treatment.

== September 4, 1902 (Thursday) ==
- The first completely electric railway line, the 66 miles (106 km) Ferrovia della Valtellina, began operations in Italy, using a 3,000-volt alternating current system designed by Hungarian engineer Kálmán Kandó and a team from the Ganz Works in Budapest.
- Voting concluded in Denmark for the Landstinget, the upper house of Denmark's bicameral legislature. Under an indirect system, male voters selected electors who, in turn, voted for the persons to fill 27 of 53 elective seats (26 of which were partway through their terms) in the 66-seat body, which had 13 persons appointed by the King. The electors, in turn, voted on September 19.
- George Hackenschmidt became the first world champion of professional wrestling by defeating European Greco-Roman champion Tom Cannon at Liverpool.
- The Absaroka National Forest was established in the U.S. state of Montana by the United States General Land Office.
- Edward Elgar's Opus 43, Dream Children, was played for the first time, premiering at the Queen's Hall in London.
- In Australian rules football, the first-ever interleague competition between the Victorian Football Association (VFA) and its relatively-new rival Victorian Football League (VFL) as two all-star teams played a charity match to raise money for Melbourne's Fred McGinis, who had played in both leagues. The VFL defeated the VFA by a score of 9-17 to 4-3 (equivalent to 71 to 27).

== September 5, 1902 (Friday) ==
- The United Kingdom and the Chinese Empire signed a commercial treaty.
- The provisional government of Haiti, led by president Pierre Théoma Boisrond-Canal, faced overthrow as government troops were overcome by rebels.
- Paul Haas replaced Bartomeu Terradas as president of FC Barcelona.
- Died: Rudolf Virchow, 80, German scientist and politician (b. 1821)

== September 6, 1902 (Saturday) ==
- Admiral Hammerton Killick of the Haitian Navy, 46, drowned after blowing up his gunboat, Crete-a-Pierrot, to avoid surrendering to the German warship SMS Panther.
- Died:Sir Frederick Abel, 75, British chemist (b. 1827)

== September 7, 1902 (Sunday) ==
- In the final of Sweden's Rosenska Pokalen football tournament, Gelfle defeated Djurgården 1-0.
- Died: William N. Roach, American politician and member of the United States Senate from 1893 to 1899 (b. 1840)

== September 8, 1902 (Monday) ==
- The Yacolt Burn, a forest fire that killed 65 people over five days in the U.S. states of Oregon and Washington, began near Eagle Creek on the Oregon side of the Columbia River that separates the two states. The immediate cause of the blaze was traced to a group of boys who had been attempting to burn a nest of hornets.
- In the town of Candela, Italy five people were killed and ten injured when 400 peasants involved in a wage dispute blocked local roads. Violence erupted and troops fired at the strikers.

== September 9, 1902 (Tuesday) ==
- Cuba's House of Representatives voted, 48 to 2, to become indebted to the United States for a $55 million loan, payable over 50-years with a variable interest rate not to exceed five percent per annum.
- British humorist P. G. Wodehouse resigned from the Hongkong and Shanghai Banking Company in London to begin a full-time writing career.

== September 10, 1902 (Wednesday) ==
- Russian officials in the Primorye region (modern territories of Amur Oblast and Primorsky Krai) a portion of Manchuria that had been annexed by the Russians in 1860, began the expulsion of all foreigners from the area, other than the indigenous Chinese residents.
- John Malarkey became the first, and only baseball pitcher to earn a win, not by holding the opposing team to a lesser score, but by hitting the game-winning home run. Pitching in the National League for the Boston Beaneaters (now the Atlanta Braves), Malarkey had held the St. Louis Cardinals to three runs and the score was tied, 3 to 3, as Malarkey came up to bat in the bottom of the 11th inning. Hitting the only home run of his career, Malarkey earned a win to finish his won-lost record at 8-10.

== September 11, 1902 (Thursday) ==
- The battleship USS Wisconsin, and the cruisers USS Cincinnati and USS Panther were dispatched to the Isthmus of Panama, at the time a part of the South American nation of Colombia, to protect American interests during a revolution in Colombia.
- Nellie Tayloe, a kindergarten teacher in Nebraska, married Tennessee lawyer William B. Ross, setting her on a path to becoming the first woman to serve as the governor of a U.S. state. The couple and their children moved to Cheyenne, Wyoming in 1906 and, with his wife's assistance, William Ross began a political career, winning election as Governor of Wyoming in 1922. Ross died on October 2, 1924, from complications of an appendectomy, and Nellie Tayloe Ross was nominated by the state Democratic Party to run in a special election to fill the remainder of his term, winning by an overwhelming majority. She served as Governor of Wyoming from 1925 to 1927.

== September 12, 1902 (Friday) ==
- The Yacolt Burn forest fire was brought under control.

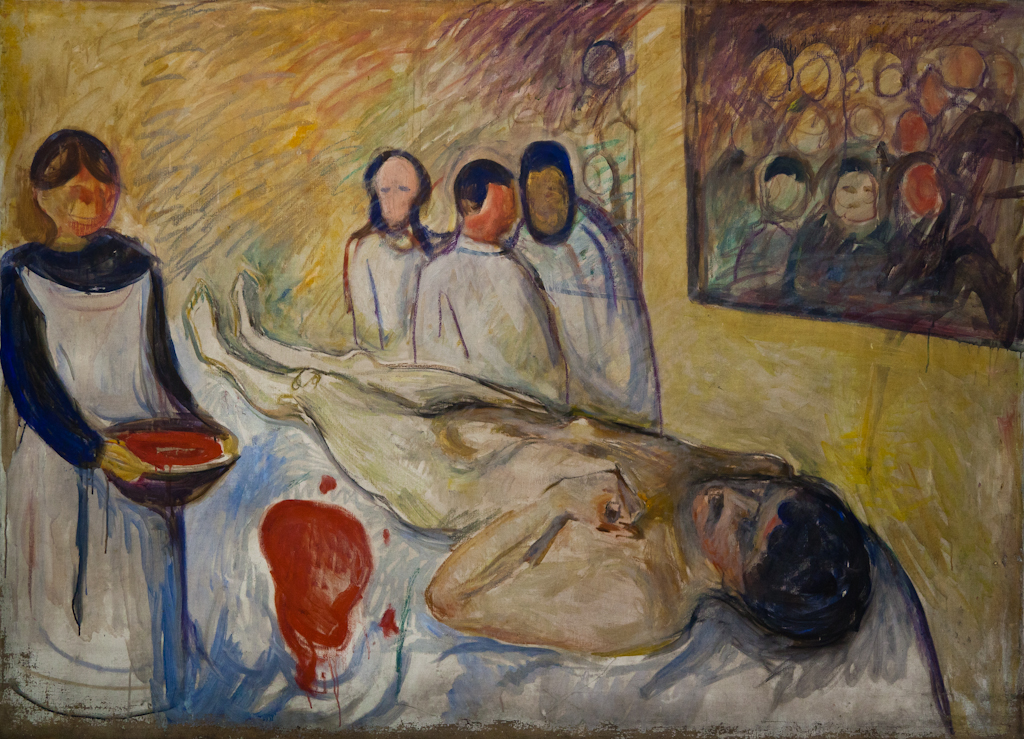
Munch's unusual self portrait, made 10 years after The Scream

- Norwegian painter Edvard Munch underwent surgery at the National Hospital in Christiana for an injured left hand and refused general anesthesia so that he could witness the entire experience in order to capture it later in art. Munch requested, and received local anesthesia in the form of a dose of cocaine "thereby enabling him to follow the operation, albeit in severe pain", and later used the memories of the experience to paint a self-portrait, På operasjonsbordet (On the Operating Table)
- Born: Juscelino Kubitschek, President of Brazil 1956 to 1961; in Diamantina, Minas Gerais (d. 1976)

== September 13, 1902 (Saturday) ==
- Harry Jackson became the first British criminal to be convicted on the basis of fingerprint evidence, after being found guilty of burglary.
- "Baseball's Sad Lexicon": Chicago Cubs players Joe Tinker, Johnny Evers and Frank Chance turned their first double play, two days after playing together for the first time.

== September 14, 1902 (Sunday) ==
- Protesters assembled at Dublin's Phoenix Park to protest against enforcement against the British government's Criminal Law and Procedure (Ireland) Act 1887 and the appointment as Lord Lieutenant of Ireland of Englishman, William Ward, 2nd Earl of Dudley.

== September 15, 1902 (Monday) ==
- Dai-ichi Life insurance company was founded in Kyōbashi, Tokyo, Japan.

== September 16, 1902 (Tuesday) ==
- Camille Pelletan, France's Navy Minister, delivered a speech at Bizerte that was heavily criticized for using language considered offensive in England, Italy and Germany.
- Queen Wilhelmina of the Netherlands appeared in person to open the nation's parliament, the Staten-Generaal.
- Born: Jakob Sporrenberg, German war criminal; in Düsseldorf (executed, 1952)

== September 17, 1902 (Wednesday) ==
- Opera singer Nellie Melba arrived in Brisbane at the start of her first Australian tour, having spent the previous 16 years in Europe.

== September 18, 1902 (Thursday) ==
- U.S. Navy Lieutenant Commander Robert Peary and his party of Arctic explorers arrived in Sydney, Nova Scotia, four years after having departed.

== September 19, 1902 (Friday) ==
- A stampede killed 115 people, nearly all African-American, at the Shiloh Baptist Church in Birmingham, Alabama, during a speech by Booker T. Washington. Believing that the building had caught fire, the crowd panicked and charged toward the lone exit. The victims were either trampled to death or smothered.
- Captain Otto Sverdrup and the Norwegian Arctic Expedition returned to Norway on the steamer Fram, four years after having departed. Though the Fram did not attempt to reach the North Pole, it charted the area west of Canada's Ellesmere Island and discovered three new islands, which were claimed for Norway but would be awarded to Canada and became the Sverdrup Islands.
- In voting by the electors selected on September 5 for elections to Denmark's parliament, the ruling Højre Party of Prime Minister Johan Deuntzer lost 13 of the 19 seats it had held, but and lost it 42-seat majority. After voting completed, the Højre Party held only 29 seats and two opposition parties combined for 31, and Deuntzer had to form a coalition government.
- Died: Masaoka Shiki, 34, Japanese haiku poet, died from tuberculosis (b. 1867)

== September 20, 1902 (Saturday) ==
- The schedule was published for the 1902–03 Primera Fuerza season, the first season of Mexico's first national soccer football league.

== September 21, 1902 (Sunday) ==
- The Cedars-Sinai Medical Center system began in the U.S. city of Los Angeles with the opening of the 12-bed Kaspare Cohn Hospital, named in honor of Jewish philanthropist Kaspare Cohn, who funded the first years and donated a two-story house located at 1443 Carroll Avenue to offer free medical care to L.A. residents. By 1910, it would relocate to a building for 60 beds and in 1930, no longer free, would become the Cedars of Lebanon Hospital with 279 beds. Cedars of Lebanon and the Mount Sinai Hospital (founded 1918) would merge to create the current research medical center.
- Canadian businessman John Lineham and partners John "Kootenay" Brown and George K. Leeson made the first discovery of oil in Western Canada, hitting a gusher at what is now Cameron Creek in the province of Alberta. The well would yield only 8,000 barrels of oil, but would lead to further exploration.
- The U.S. Army transport USAT Warren began the repatriation of most of 43 Philippine political prisoners of war who had been exiled to Guam by the U.S. during the Philippine–American War. The rest would agree to return in February, 1903.
- Born: Luis Cernuda, Spanish poet; in Seville (d. 1963)

== September 22, 1902 (Monday) ==
- The Mariana Islands were struck by a magnitude 7.5 earthquake, which caused major damage on Guam and Saipan.
- The Republic of Cuba's President, Tomás Estrada Palma, requested that the United States withdraw its artillery companies stationed in the island nation.
- In Canada, the Canadian Pacific Railway, through its subsidiary, the Ottawa, Northern and Western Railway, acquired the Pontiac Pacific Junction Railway.
- Born: John Houseman, British-American actor and producer; in Bucharest, as Jacques Haussmann (d. 1988)

== September 23, 1902 (Tuesday) ==
- In the U.S. state of Pennsylvania, Governor William A. Stone dispatched state militia troops to Lackawanna County to bring rioting iron and steel workers under control. The entire state national guard would be sent to the anthracite coal mining areas on October 6.
- Born: Ion Gheorghe Maurer, Romanian politician, 49th Prime Minister of Romania; in Bucharest (d. 2000)

== September 24, 1902 (Wednesday) ==
- The Bailundo revolt began in Angola as a column of Portuguese colonial soldiers led by Pedro Massano de Amorim, arrived from Luanda and entered Bailundo fort in readiness for anticipated attack.
- A Venezuelan Navy gunboat, making unauthorized use of the United States flag, was allowed to approach the rebel-held city of Ciudad Bolívar and then began bombardment. The next day, U.S. Ambassador Herbert W. Bowen delivered a protest and warning to Venezuela's President Cipriano Castro.
- Born: The Ayatollah Ruhollah Khomeini, Iranian Shia cleric and the first Supreme Leader of Iran; in Khomeyn, Iran (official birth date) (d. 1989)

== September 25, 1902 (Thursday) ==
- William Ward, Earl of Dudley, arrived at Dublin to take office as the new Lord Lieutenant of Ireland.

== September 26, 1902 (Friday) ==
- Floods killed 300 people in the city of Modica on the Italian island of Sicily after a cyclone struck hits the island's east coast. and the cathedral of Belpasso collapses, with another 600 deaths resulting.
- Born: Albert Anastasia, Italian-born American mobster, in Parghelia, Calabria, Italy (murdered, 1957)
- Died: Levi Strauss, 73, American businessman and the first manufacturer of denim jeans (b. 1829)

== September 27, 1902 (Saturday) ==
- Several tobacco companies in the UK and the U.S. were amalgamated as the British-American Tobacco Company, Ltd.
- A railway accident in the French town of Arleux killed 22 people and injured 60 others.
- Collingwood Football Club won the Victorian Football League Grand Final, defeating Essendon Football Club at the Melbourne Cricket Ground in front of a record crowd of 35,000 people.

== September 28, 1902 (Sunday) ==
- The 1,800 streetcar workers in New Orleans in the U.S. state of Louisiana went on strike to make a demand for to be limited to an eight-hour day and an increase in their wages to 25 cents an hour.
- Died:
  - John Marks Moore, 49, American politician and attorney (b. 1853)

== September 29, 1902 (Monday) ==
- Russia agreed to return control of China's Beijing to Shanhaiguan railway to the Chinese government.
- Died:
  - Émile Zola, 62, French novelist, playwright and journalist, died of carbon monoxide poisoning apparently caused by an improperly ventilated chimney (b. 1840)
  - William McGonagall, 77, Scottish 'poet and tragedian' (b. 1825)

== September 30, 1902 (Tuesday) ==
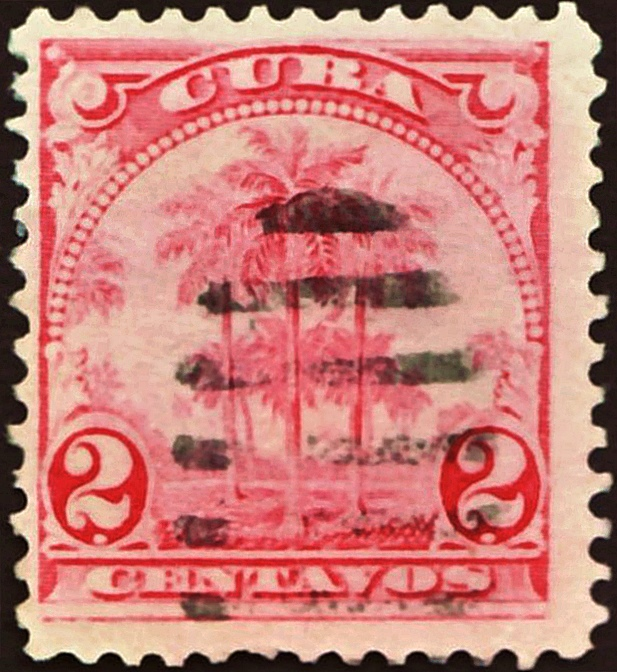

- Founded four months earlier, the Republic of Cuba issued its first postage stamps.
