= Ida Siekmann =

First known person to die at the Berlin Wall

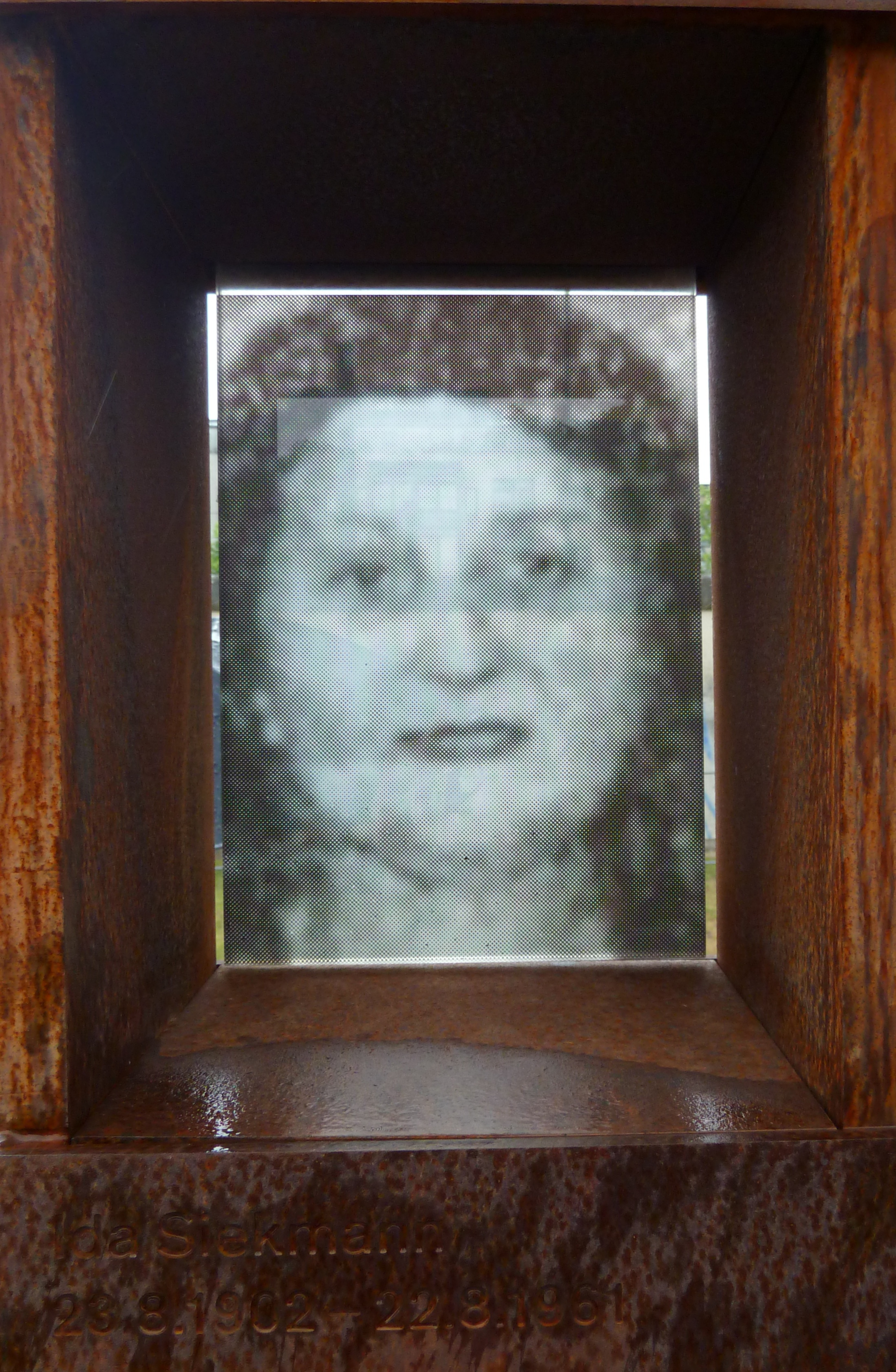
- Ida Siekmann, at the Window of Remembrance, Berlin Wall Memorial
- Born: 23 August 1902; Gorken, West Prussia, German Empire
- Died: 22 August 1961 (aged 58); West Berlin, West Germany
- Cause of death: Fall injuries
- Body discovered: Bernauer Straße 48; 52.5402°N 13.4029°E
- Resting place: Urnenfriedhof Seestraße Berlin-Wedding; 52.5521°N 13.3544°E
- Monuments: "Window of Remembrance", Berlin
- Known for: First casualty at the Berlin Wall

Ida Siekmann (23 August 1902 – 22 August 1961) was a German nurse who became the first known person to die at the Berlin Wall, only nine days after the beginning of its construction.

== Biography ==
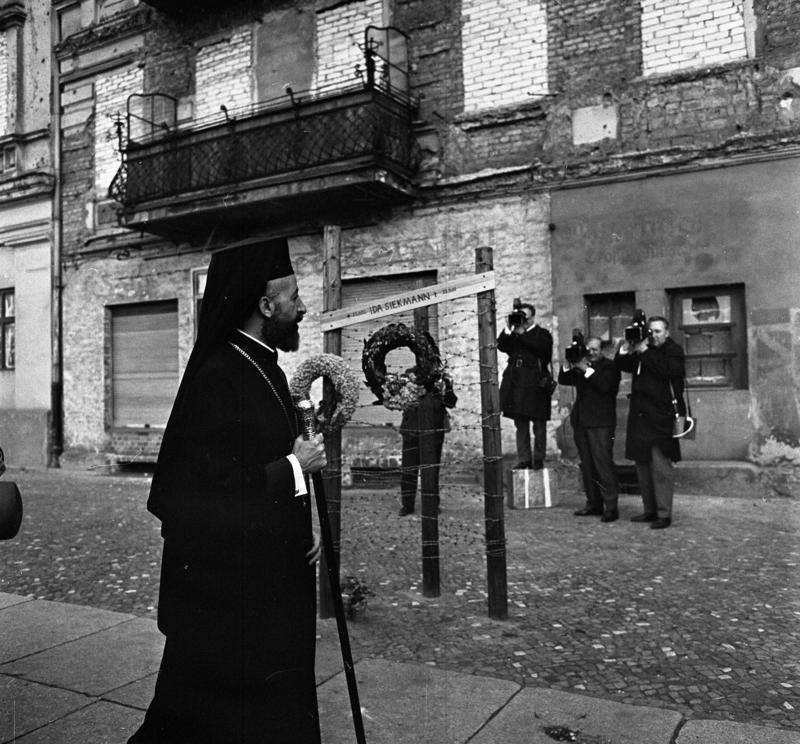
Makarios III, President of Cyprus, at the Siekmann memorial (1962)

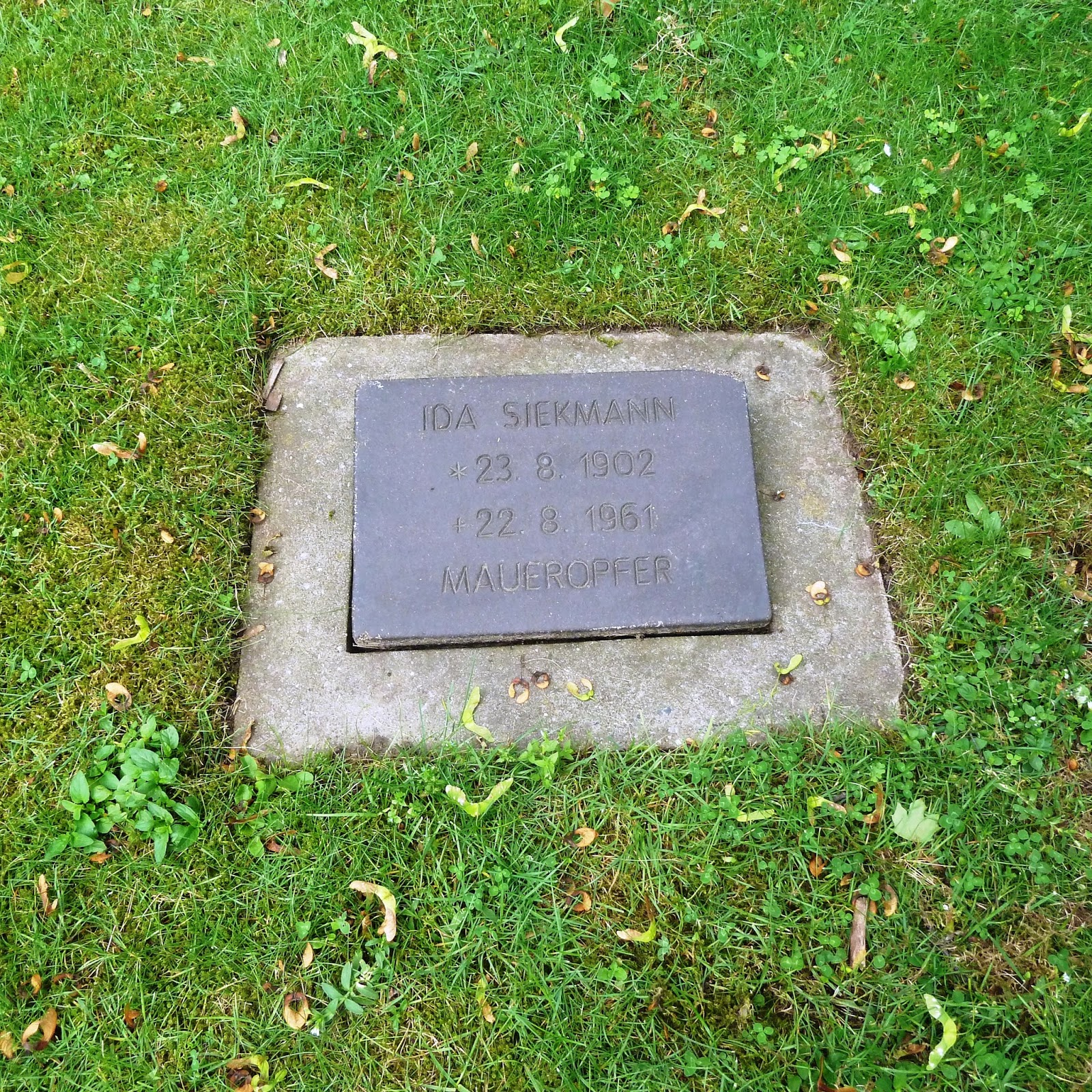
Ida Siekmann's grave, at the Urnenfriedhof Seestraße, Berlin-Wedding (2011)

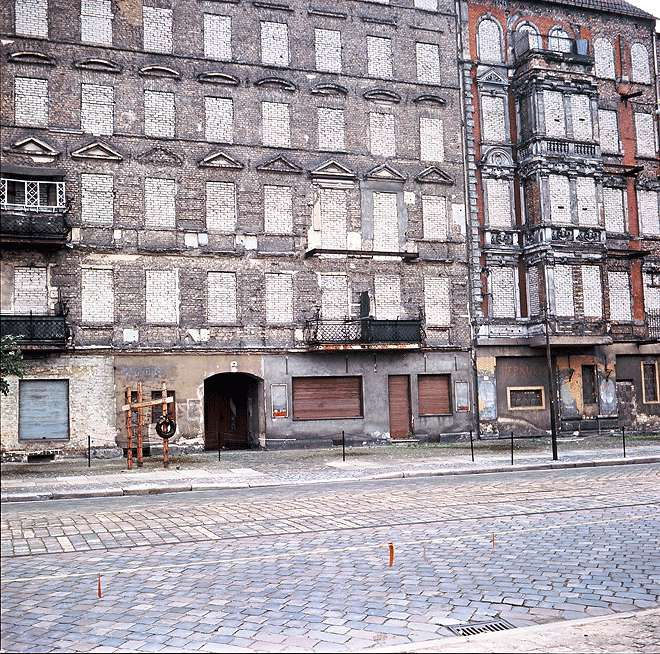
Bernauer Straße 48 (and 47c to the far right) in June 1965. Annotations (on the Wikimedia Commons version of this page) show Ida Siekmann's front door and the window that she jumped from, three floors above the ground floor.

Ida Siekmann was born on 23 August 1902, in Gorken near Marienwerder, West Prussia in the German Empire (now Górki, Kwidzyn County, Poland). She had moved to Berlin where she worked as a nurse, and by August 1961 was already a widow, although it is not known when she was widowed. Siekmann lived at Bernauer Straße 48 in the district of Mitte, and had a sister, Martha L., who lived only a few blocks away on Lortzingstraße.

After World War II, Berlin was divided into four Allied sectors, and while the street and the sidewalk of the Bernauer Straße lay in the French sector of West Berlin, the frontage of the buildings on the southern side lay in the Soviet sector of East Berlin. Siekmann regularly crossed the border between the French and Soviet sectors just by leaving her house. Siekmann's sister at Lortzingstraße was located in the French sector of West Berlin.

== Death ==
On 13 August 1961, East Germany began the construction of the Berlin Wall, and immediately after the border between East and West Berlin was closed numerous families and individuals from 50 Bernauer Straße addresses fled to the West. On 18 August 1961, East German leader Walter Ulbricht ordered the border troops to brick up the entrances and windows on the ground floor of the buildings on the southern side of the street. Members of the Combat Groups of the Working Class and Volkspolizei controlled every person who tried to enter the houses, and the residents were subject to rigid controls, even in the hallways. Many residents of such tenements still fled to West Berlin, as residents of the upper floors were often rescued by jumping sheets held open by the West Berlin fire department.

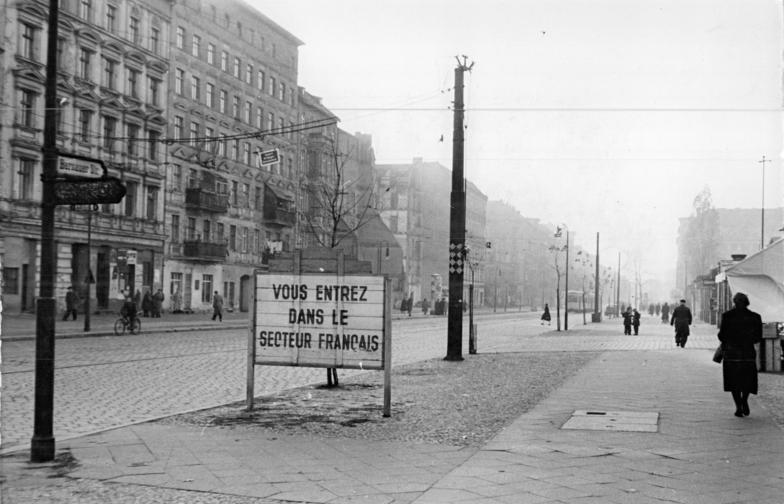
Bernauer Straße in November 1955, including Bernauer Straße 48, with annotations (on the Wikimedia Commons version of this page) showing Ida Siekmann's front door and the fourth-floor window that she jumped from

On 21 August, the entrance and windows of Bernauer Straße 48 were being barred by the East German authorities. The following morning, the day before her 59th birthday, Siekmann threw a quilt and some possessions down onto the street in West Berlin before she jumped out of the window of her third-floor (by German standards, fourth-floor by North American standards) apartment. Siekmann jumped before the firefighters were able to properly open the jumping sheet, and was severely injured when she fell on the pavement. Siekmann died while on her way to the Lazarus Hospital shortly after the fall, thus becoming the first known casualty at the Berlin Wall.

== Burial ==
Siekmann was buried at the Seestraße cemetery on 29 August; in September a memorial was erected at Bernauer Straße 48. The memorial was often visited by foreign politicians, including Robert F. Kennedy and Archbishop Makarios, to honour the victims of the Berlin Wall.

The houses on the southern side of Bernauer Straße were torn down in 1963 and replaced by a concrete wall.

== See also ==
- List of deaths at the Berlin Wall
- Berlin Crisis of 1961

== Literature ==
- Hans-Hermann Hertle, Maria Nooke, The deaths at the Berlin Wall 1961–1989: a biographical handbook (ed. the Centre for Contemporary History Potsdam and the Berlin Wall Foundation). Links, Berlin 2009, ISBN 978-3-86153-517-1, pp. 36–38
