= Narbal Fontes =

Brazilian writer

Narbal Fontes (1899-1960) was a Brazilian writer. He wrote his books together with his wife, Ofélia Fontes (1902–1986). He was born in Tietê, São Paulo, on August 21, 1902 and died in Rio de Janeiro city, state of Rio de Janeiro, on April 29, 1960.

== Bibliography ==
- No Reino do Pau-Brasil
- Senhor Menino
- Regina, A Rosa de Maio
- Romance de São Paulo
- Rui, O Maior
- Precisa-se de Um Rei
- O Gigante de Botas
- Coração de Onça
- O Talismã de Vidro
- A Gigantinha
- A Espingarda de Ouro
- Aventuras de Um Coco da Bahia
- Esopo, O Contador de Estórias
- Novas Estórias de Esopo
- A Falsa Estória Maravilhosa
- Espírito do Sol
- O Micróbio Donaldo
- História do Bebê
- Ler, Escrever e Contar
- Ilha do Sol
- Brasileirinho
- Companheiros
- Pindorama
- O Menino dos Olhos Luminosos
- A Boa Semente
- A Vida de Santos Dumont
- O Bicho Sete Ciências
- O Gênio do Bem
- Cem Noites Tapuias
