= 1902 in Brazilian football =

Football in Brazil
- Season: 1902

The 1902 season was the first season of competitive football in Brazil. This was the first season of the São Paulo State Championship, the first official tournament contested in Brazil.

== Campeonato Paulista ==
First Stage

Teams advanced to the final

Position	Team	Points	Played	Won	Drawn	Lost	For	Against	Difference
1	São Paulo Athletic	12	8	5	2	1	21	5	16
2	Paulistano	12	8	5	2	1	14	8	6
3	Mackenzie	9	8	3	3	2	13	15	−2
4	Germânia	4	8	1	2	5	5	15	−10
5	SC Internacional de São Paulo	3	8	0	3	5	4	14	−10

Final

October 26, 1902

São Paulo Athletic	2–1	Paulistano

São Paulo Athletic declared as the Campeonato Paulista champions.
