= Statue of Anders Sandøe Ørsted =

Statue in Copenhagen, Denmark

Anders Sandøe Ørsted
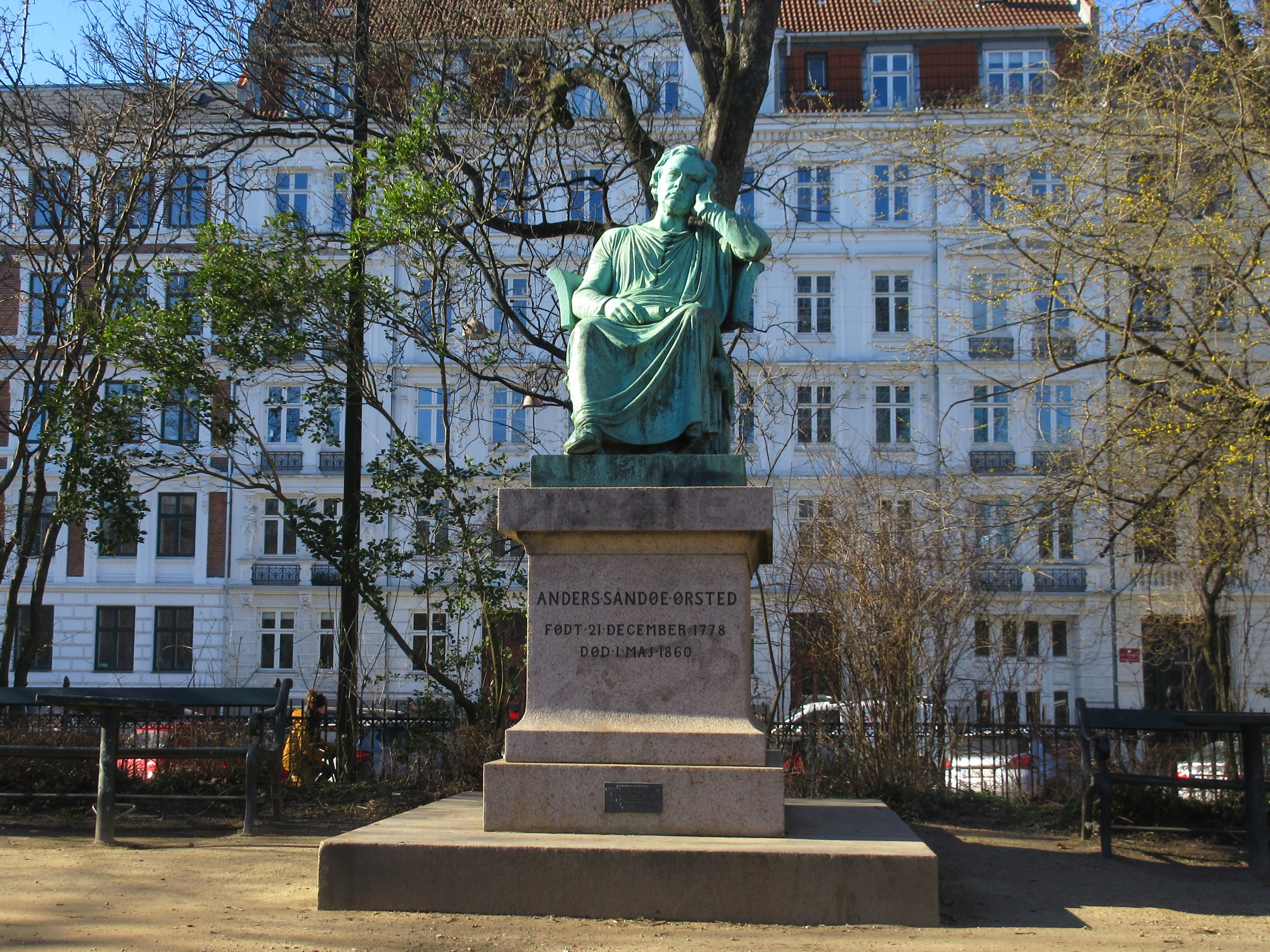
- The statue in 2010
- Artist: Herman Wilhelm Bissen/Vilhelm Bissen
- Year: 1938
- Medium: Bronze
- Subject: Anders Sandøe Ørsted
- Location: Copenhagen

The Statue of Anders Sandøe Ørsted is located in Ørstedsparken in Copenhagen, Denmark. Anders Sandøe Ørsted was Denmark's leading jurist of the mid-19th century. He served as Prime Minister of Denmark in 1853–54.

== Description ==
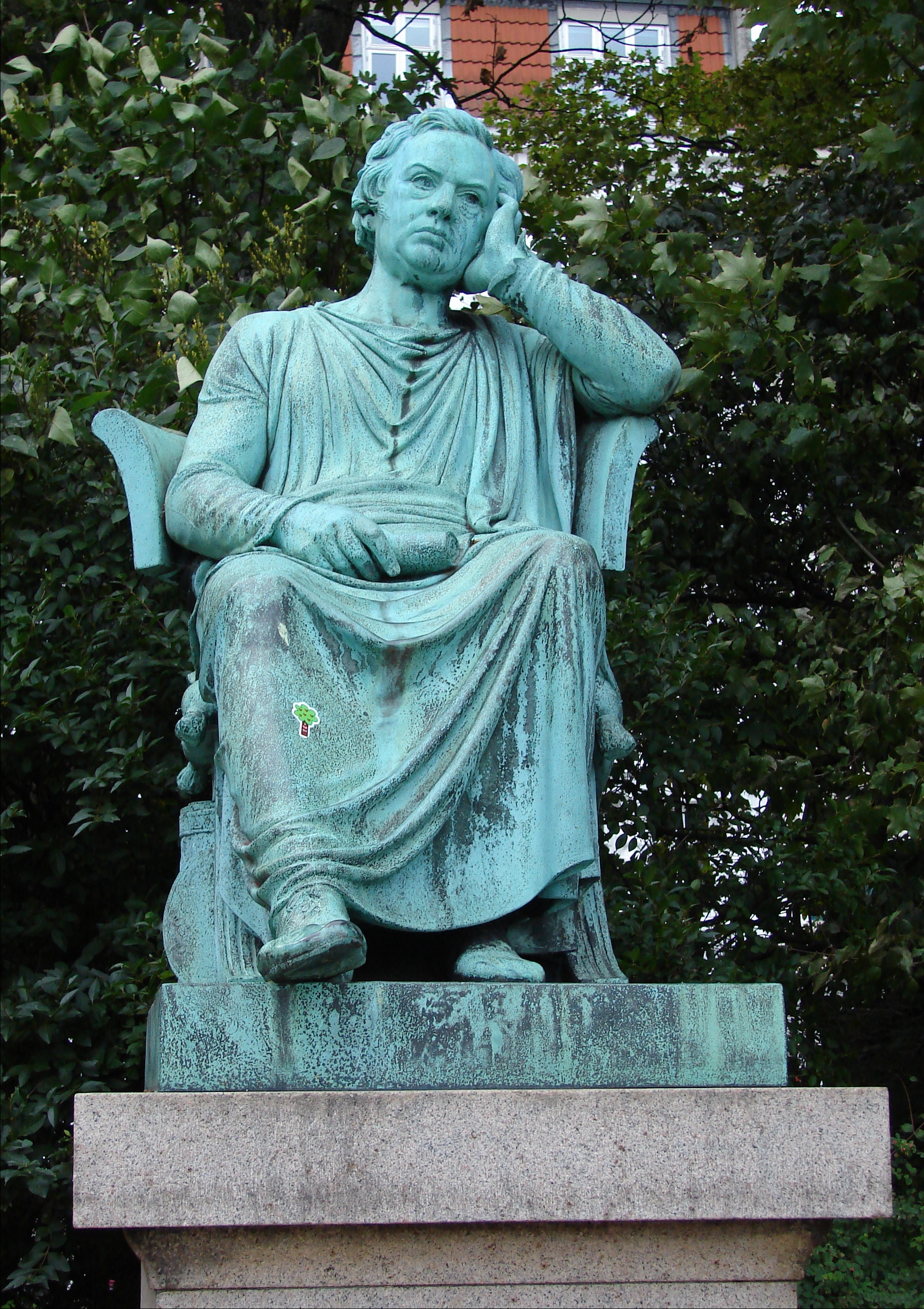
Close-up of the bronze statue.

The monument consists of a bronze sculpture standing on a granite plinth and measures 375 cm × 232 cm × 313 cm (12.30 ft × 7.61 ft × 10.27 ft). Ørsted is depicted as an ancient wise man, sitting on a klismos and wearing a toga. He is shown in a moment of quiet contemplation, resting his left arm on the back of the chair and his chin against his hand. Under the chair stands a casket with scrolls. The casket is decorated with a relief depicting the scene where "Memesis reads the deeds of man aloud to Jupiter" ("Nemesis oplæser menneskenes gerninger for Jupiter").

== History ==
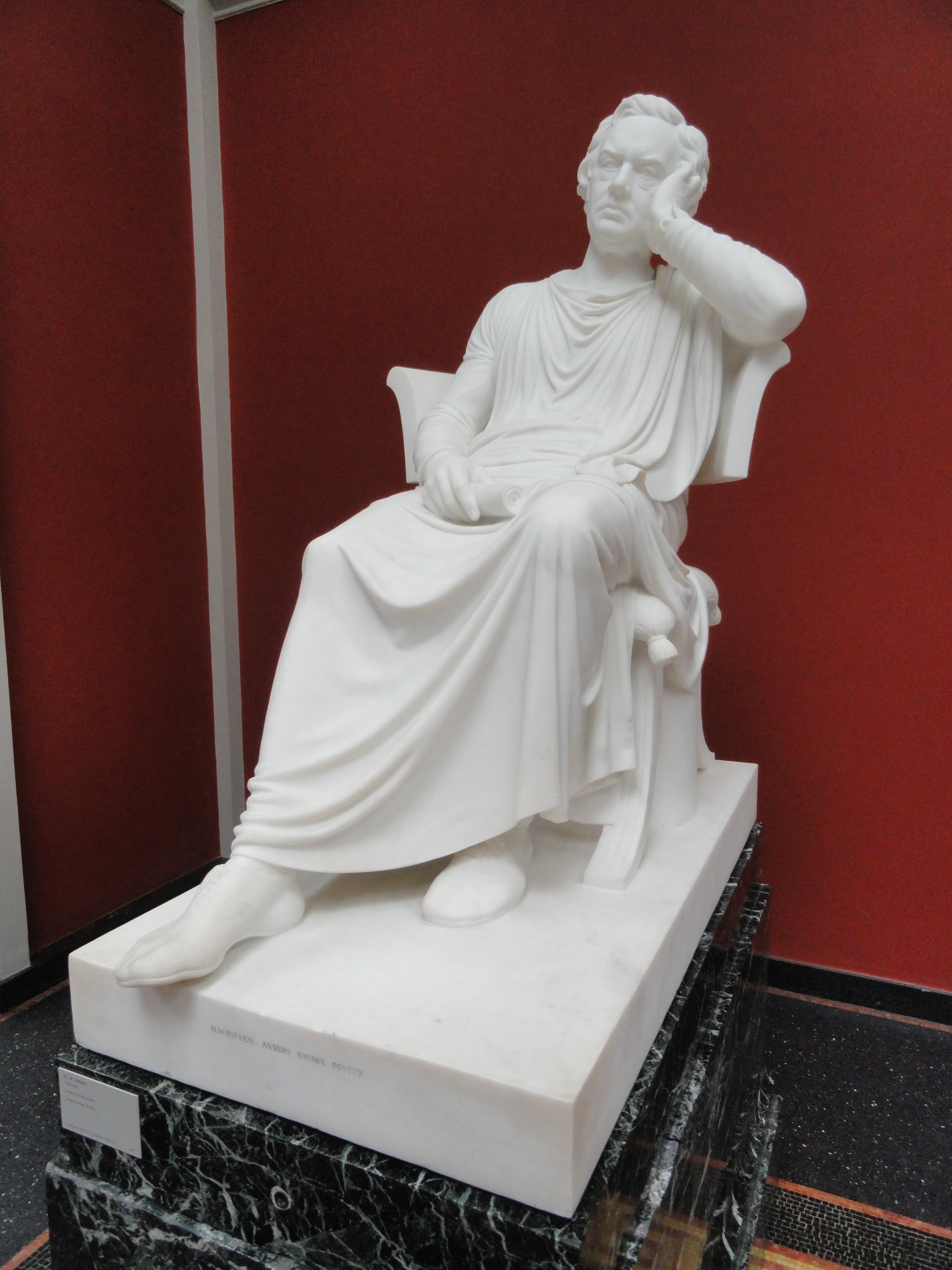
Vilhelm Bissen's marble copy of his father's 1837 plaster statue

The statue was originally commissioned from Herman Wilhelm Bissen at the initiative of the art historian Niels Laurits Høyen. Bissen created a small statuette in 1835–36 and the original plaster model in 1836–37. The plan was to raise 6,000 Danish rigsdaler for a marble statue but Ørsted's strong political views resulted in dwindling popularity. Orla Lehmann wrote to Høyen that Ørsted wasn't a statesman but "the servant of a Fürst".

In 1842, Høyen made a new attempt to raise the money but Ørsted that same year went up against Peter Hiort Lorenzen who had spoken Danish at the stænderforsamling in Slesvig. This prompted Høyen to call off the fund-raising campaign. Bissen, who was known for his temper, was outraged. In about 1852, he was supposedly about the destroy the model but was stopped by force by a group of his students.

Bissen died in 1868 and thus never got to see the statue completed. Vilhelm Bissen his son and student, continued his father's studio. He sold his father's Ørsted plaster model to Carl Jacobsen in 1882. In 1885, Jacobsen also commissioned a marble copy from him.

The outdoor monument was commissioned in connection with the 10th Nordic Jurist Meeting and financed through donations from Danish and Norwegian jurists. The bronze statue was based on Bissen Jr.'s 1885 marble copy and cast in Lauritz Rasmussen's Bronze Foundry. It was unveiled during the conference on 27 August 1902.

== Gallery ==
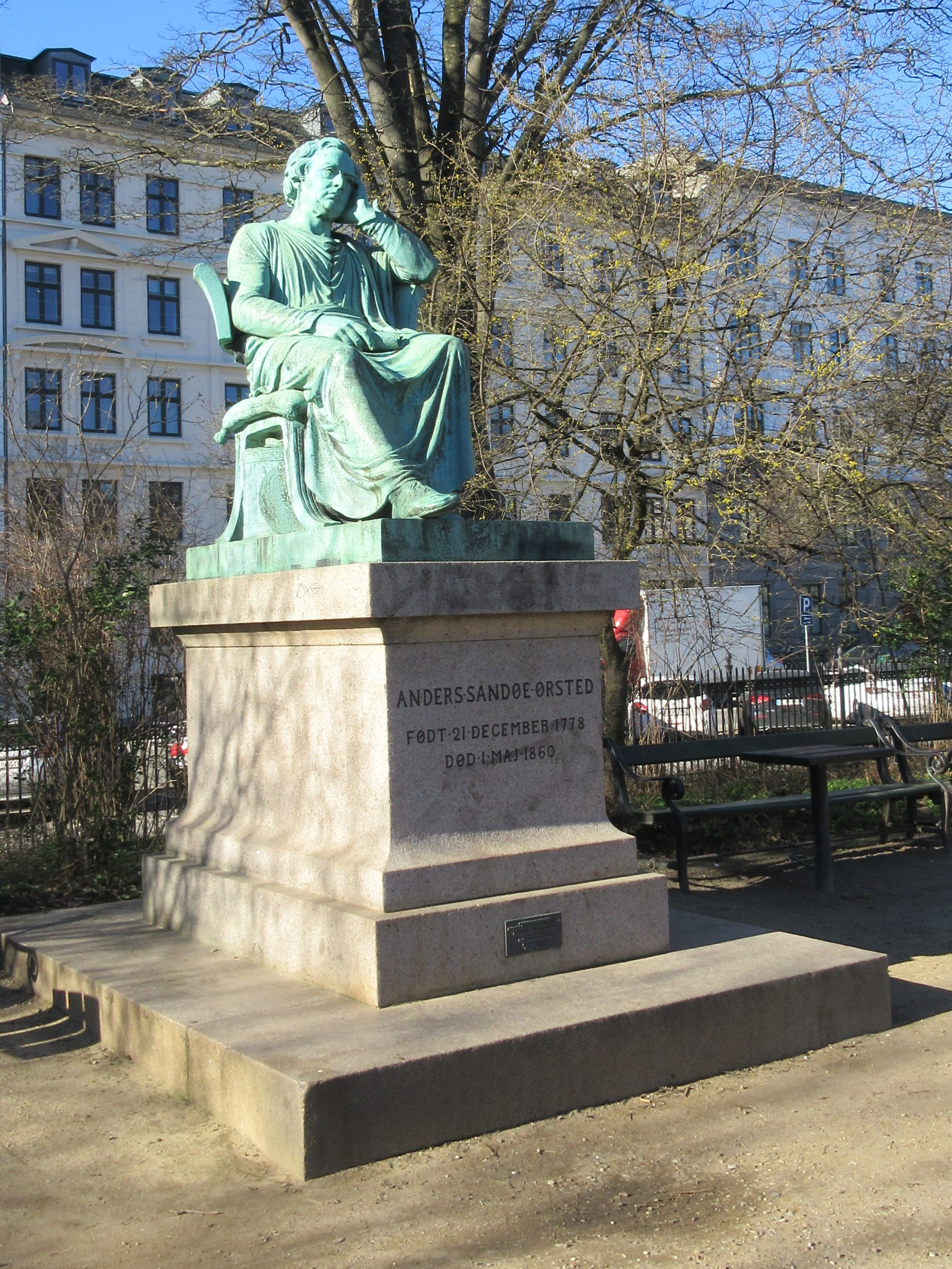
