= Częstochowa pogrom (1902) =

Anti-Semitic disturbance in Russian territory

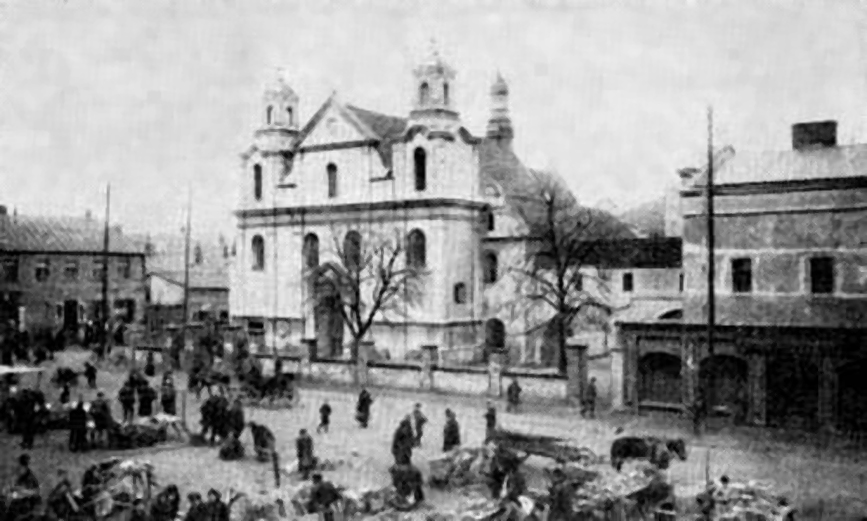
New Market, at the turn of the century

Częstochowa pogrom refers to an antisemitic disturbance that occurred on August 11, 1902, in the town of Chenstokhov, Russian Partition under Nicholas II (modern Częstochowa, Poland). According to an official Russian report by the Tsarist Governor of the Piotrków Governorate (residing at the 85 kilometres (53 mi) distance), the said pogrom started after an altercation between a Jewish shopkeeper and a Catholic woman.

== Polish version of the events ==
However, Polish historical research does not corroborate Russian claims. No Jews died in the disturbance. The fight at the marketplace between a Jewish man and an ethnic Pole, both suspected of illegal activities, was instigated by the soldiers of the Imperial Russian Army. Almost instantly, the conflict turned into a mass protest against the Russian occupation. Two people were killed. The riot escalated. The Tsarists Cossacks bludgeoned the president of the Jewish council Henryk Markusfeld and attacked the Jewish neighbourhood, raping young women, looting, and destroying property. It was the first such event in Częstochowa's history.

There were 12,000 Jewish people in Częstochowa at the turn of the century, about 29% of the population. Notably, the relations between Jews and Poles in the town were good. "Products of Jewish goldsmiths – wrote Father Jan Związek – adorned not only the synagogue interiors, but also some Catholic churches." However, bloody anti-Russian disturbances began in Częstochowa already in May 1894 in which 2,200 workers participated. The relations with the occupational forces reached its lowest point in 1905 when many striking workers were killed by the Russians, many others arrested, and sent to Siberia.

== Russian and Jewish version of the events ==
According to the Tsarist Governor stationing in Piotrków, a mob attacked the Jewish shops in Częstochowa, killing fourteen Jews and one Russian gendarme. The imperial army brought in to restore order were said to have been stoned by the mob. Soldiers then fired, and shot two Polish rioters and wounded several others according to the Russian Governor. Within days, the Tsarist report from Russia made its way to the foreign press. The incident's alleged description was repeated by New York Times on September 14, 1902.

Jewish Workers' Voice reported:

The beaten Christian woman was not even badly wounded and on the same day she signed herself out of the hospital. But, despite this, everyone, even the doctors in the hospital, spread a rumor that the Christian woman had died. On the 11th of August, at half past 12 in the afternoon, at the time when they left for the factories to eat lunch, a mob of brickworkers (mulaczes), factory workers and young gentile boys began to throw stones into Jewish shops at the 'old market.' No police were seen there; there were no soldiers in Czenstochow. They had been sent away on maneuvers. The Jews began to close their shops. Then several policemen and a commissioner (pristov) and a gendarme officer appeared. The workers dispersed, beating every Jew in a long kaftan on the way. The 'old market,' the center of Jewish trade, was calm then. However, at the same time, a 'pogrom' began in the poor streets. ... Among the soldiers who had remained in the city were many Jews, and the Polish anti-Semites then spread a rumor that only because of this had the soldiers not refused to shoot into the crowd. ... the mob, not meeting any opposition, rampaged widely. They robbed and destroyed all of the Jewish warehouses, beginning with the small shops and ending with the large, rich department stores, which had placed “icons” and candles in the windows. ... The mob was warned twice that it should disperse; twice bullets were fired in vain, but this only provoked the mob more and they began to throw stones at the soldiers. Then there was substantial gunfire; two were left dead on the spot and several were seriously wounded… It is interesting that there were several Jews among the wounded. Therefore, it should be assumed that the soldiers shot not only at the aggressors but also at those who were attacked. It was quiet after the massacre, but the looters did not stop in the surrounding streets. There was particularly severe looting on Warszawer Street and in Czenstochowka; here, several from the mob [of people] threw several stones at the Tsar Aleksander II memorial. And the singing of the Polish national song, Jeszcze Polska nie zginela [Poland Has Not Yet Perished], was heard. Because of this, several later spread a rumor that the pogrom ostensibly carried a political character…

— Arbeter Shtime [Voice of the Worker], number 30 (of October 1902)

Because of its large Jewish community and the town's importance as a place of pilgrimage for Polish Catholics, Częstochowa experienced anti-Jewish disturbances nevertheless. On May 27, 1919, five Jews were killed in revenge for the shooting of a Polish officer by a young Jew in broad daylight at the NMP Avenue. In June 1937, during the attempted robbery of a Jewish shop one Christian passerby was shot by a Bund member, resulting in dozens of Jewish establishments being destroyed by the right-wing youth, with no fatalities on either side. Throughout the interwar period, Jewish merchants dominated in textile, leather, and food industries locally. Over half of the retail establishment belonged to Jews in Częstochowa before World War II.
