= Górki, Kwidzyn County =

Górki
- Village
- Location within Poland
- Coordinates: 53°43′51″N 18°57′43″E
- Country: Poland
- Voivodeship: Pomeranian
- County: Kwidzyn
- Gmina: Kwidzyn
- Population: 538

Górki [ˈɡurki] is a village in the administrative district of Gmina Kwidzyn, within Kwidzyn County, Pomeranian Voivodeship, in northern Poland.

For the history of the region, see History of Pomerania.

== Notable residents ==
- Ida Siekmann (1902–1961), first casualty of the Berlin Wall
