= Duprez & Benedict's Minstrels =

American minstrel group

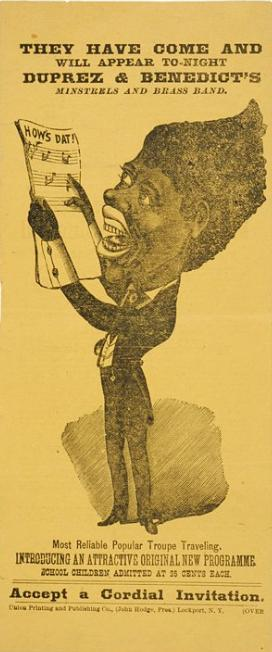
Duprez & Benedict playbill

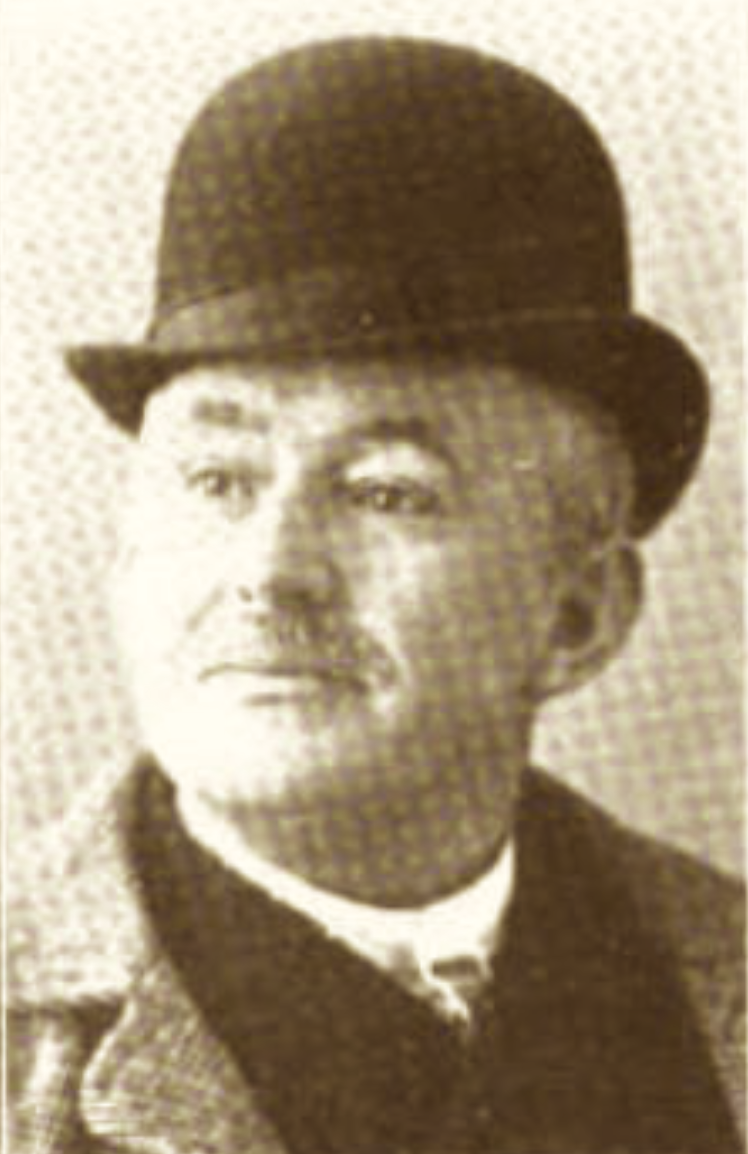
Lew Benedict

Duprez & Benedict's Minstrels were an American minstrel group led by Charles H. Duprez and Lew Benedict, which enjoyed its greatest popularity in the late 1860s and 1870s.

== Background ==
Charles H. Duprez began performing minstrel shows in 1852 in New Orleans with a group that became known as Carle, Duprez and Green's Minstrels. By 1858, this group was known as Duprez and Green's, until J.E. Green ("Mocking Bird Green") retired in 1865. Lew Benedict, who had joined the group in 1861, then bought out Green's share, and the group became known as Duprez & Benedict's Minstrels, which became well known across the United States. Benedict left the group in 1876, but Duprez maintained the group name and trademark until about 1885. Archie White joined as a partner in 1877.

A 1906 article provides this description of the group in 1870:

In 1870 Duprez and Benedict's Minstrels were known all over this country and had many old timers in their troupe. In the overture they had the endmen Hughey Dougherty, singing "It's Nice to be a Father" and Lew Benedict "Hot Corn." Both of these grand old minstrel men are still on the stage. "Sall Ann's Away," Chas. Gleason; "I am Lonely no More," D. Swabe Vernon; "Little Brown Jug," (a big hit) Charlie Reynolds; "The Dear Little Shamrock," Fred B. Naylor, and the famous Cocoanut Quarette, Benedict, Gleason, Parkhurst and Lew Collins, completed the company.

Other noted performers with the group included Frank Dumont.
