= Charles H. Duprez =

American minstrel show performer and manager

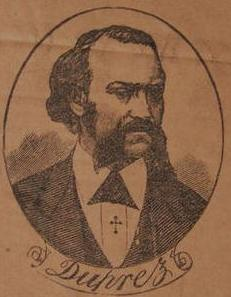
- Portrait of Duprez on 1881 handbill for a Duprez & Benedict's show
- Born: 14 March 1833; France
- Died: 31 August 1902 (aged 69); Providence, Rhode Island, U.S.
- Occupations: Minstrel show performer and manager

Charles H. Duprez (14 March 1833 – August 31, 1902) was an American minstrel show performer and manager. He is best known as one of the principals of the Duprez & Benedict's Minstrels, which was a highly popular American minstrel group in the late 1860s and 1870s.

== Life ==
Duprez was originally from France, according to his naturalization record on 29 July 1887 Lowell, Massachusetts, and began performing minstrel shows in 1852 in New Orleans, with a group that became known as Carle, Duprez and Green's Minstrels. By 1858, this group was known as Duprez and Green's, until Green retired in 1865. Lew Benedict (who had joined the group in 1861) bought out Green's share, and the group became known as Duprez & Benedict's Minstrels, which became well known across the United States. Benedict left the group in 1876, but Duprez maintained the group until about 1885, and then purchased the Washington Tavern hotel in Lowell. His effort to revive the hotel's fortunes were unsuccessful, but he continued to work in different capacities in the area's hotel business and operating rides at local amusement parks. Shortly before he died, he was running the "boat merry-go-round" at Crescent Park in Providence.

Duprez died of heart failure at the Rhode Island Hospital in Providence, Rhode Island, on August 31, 1902. 1902 obituary reports stated that he was 65 years old at the time of his death, but Edward Le Roy Rice's 1911 Monarchs of Minstrelsy reports that Duprez was born in Paris, France, on March 13, 1830.
